= List of the Cenozoic life of Washington =

This list of the Cenozoic life of Washington contains the various prehistoric life-forms whose fossilized remains have been reported from within the US state of Washington and are between 66 million and 10,000 years of age. Significant biotas for the understanding of climate and biotic changes include the Ypresian Klondike Mountain Formation's paleobiota and the Barstovian Latah Formation's paleobiota.

== Chlorophytes ==
- Botryococcus
  - Undescribed Late Pleistocene Manis Mastodon site subfossil
- Pediastrum
  - Undescribed Late Pleistocene Manis Mastodon site subfossil

== Diatoms ==
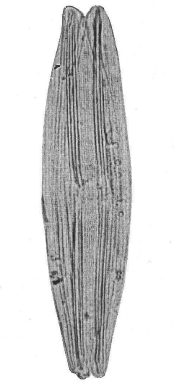
Frustulia rhomboides

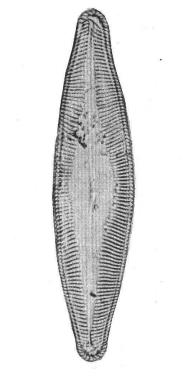
Navicula contendens

- Actinella
  - Actinella brasiliensis
- Amphipleura
  - Amphipleura oregonica
- Aulacoseira
  - †Aulacoseira distans- type locality for species
  - Aulacoseira granulata
- Caloneis
  - Caloneis westii
- Cavinula
  - Cavinula scutiformis
- Coscinodiscus
  - Coscinodiscus subaulacodiscoidalis
- Cymbella
  - Cymbella americana
  - Cymbella amphicephala
  - Cymbella flexella
  - Cymbella lunula
  - Cymbella partita
  - Cymbella sagittarius
- Desmogonium
  - Desmogonium rabenhorstianum
- Diatoma
  - Diatoma grande
  - Diatoma tenue var. hybrida
  - Diatoma vulgaris
- Eunotia
  - Eunotia incisa
  - Eunotia parallela
  - Eunotia pectinalis
  - Eunotia robusta
- Fragilaria
  - Fragilaria constricta
  - Fragilaria binalis
- Frustulia
  - Frustulia rhomboides
- Gomphogramma
  - Gomphogramma rupestre
- Gomphonema
  - Gomphonema acuminatum
  - Gomphonema gracile
  - Gomphonema parvulum
- Himantidium
  - Himantidium faba
  - Himantidium gracile
  - Himantidium minus
- Melosira
  - Melosira biseriata
  - Melosira lyrata
  - Melosira teres
  - Melosira undulata
- Navicula
  - Navicula americana
  - Navicula angusta
  - Navicula bacillum
  - Navicula commutata
  - †Navicula contendens - type locality for species
  - Navicula elegans
  - Navicula instabilis
  - †Navicula pauper - type locality for species
  - Navicula placentula
  - †Navicula pontifica - type locality for species
  - †Navicula protrudens - type locality for species
  - †Navicula pseudoaffinis - type locality for species
  - Navicula pseudobacillum
  - Navicula pusilla
  - Navicula radiosa
  - †Navicula reversa - type locality for species
  - Navicula stauroptera
  - Navicula subacuta
  - †Navicula substauroneis - type locality for species
  - Navicula tabellaria
  - Navicula transversa
  - Navicula viridis
- Neidium
  - Neidium dubium
  - Neidium iridescens
  - Neidium iridis
- Pinnularia
  - Pinnularia gibba
  - Pinnularia gracillima
  - Pinnularia major
  - Pinnularia mesotyla
  - Pinnularia nodosa
  - Pinnularia rupestris
  - Pinnularia subcapitata
- Stauroneis
  - †Stauroneis acutissima - type locality for species
  - Stauroneis anceps
  - Stauroneis phoenicenteron
- Surirella
  - Surirella bifrons
  - Surirella inducta
  - Surirella striatula
- Tabellaria
  - Tabellaria fenestrata
  - Tabellaria flocculosa
- Tetracyclus
  - Tetracyclus ellipticus
  - Tetracyclus lacustris

== Foraminifera ==
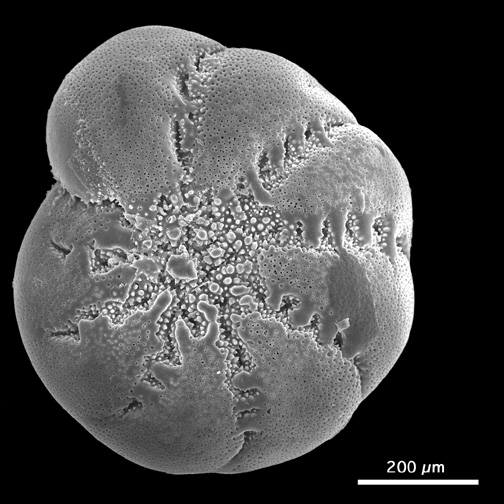
Test of Elphidium

- Amphimorphina
  - †Amphimorphina californica
- Amphistegina
  - undescribed Eocene Crescent Formation fossil(s)
- Bulimina
  - Cf. †Bulimina jacksonensis
- Cassidulina
  - Cf. †Cassidulina galvinensis
- Chilostomella
  - Cf. †Chilostomella oolina
- Cibicides
  - †Cibicides cushmani
  - †Cibicides midwayensis
- Cibicidoides
  - †Cibicidoides coalingensis
- Dentalina
  - Cf. †Dentalina consorbrina
  - Cf. †Dentalina dusenburyi
  - Cf. †Dentalina hispidocostata
  - †Dentalina longiscata
- Eggerella
  - Cf. †Eggerella bradyi
- Elphidium
- Eponides
  - †Eponides mexicana
  - †Eponides yeguaensis
- Gaudryina
  - †Gaudryina jacksonensis
- Globigerina
  - Undescribed Late Eocene Whiskey Creek methane-seep fossil
- 'Globobulimina
  - †Globobulimina pacifica
- Globocassidulina
  - †Globocassidulina globosa
- Guttulina
  - †Guttulina frankei
- Gyroidina
  - †Gyroidina orbicularis
- Haplophragmoides
  - Undescribed Late Eocene Whiskey Creek methane-seep fossil
- †Involutina
  - Cf. †Involutina incertus
- Lenticulina
  - Lenticulina rancocasensis
  - Undescribed Late Eocene Whiskey Creek methane-seep fossil
  - Undescribed Ypresian Crescent Formation fossil
- Marginulina
  - †Marginulina subbulata
- Martinottiella
  - †Martinottiella communis
- Plectofrondicularia
  - Cf. †Plectofrondicularia vaughani
- †Pseudoglandulina
  - Cf. †Pseudoglandulina inflata
- Pyrgo (foraminifera)
  - Cf. †Pyrgo lupheri
- Quinqueloculina
  - †Quinqueloculina imperalis
  - †Quinqueloculina imperialis
- Robulus
  - Cf. †Robulus texanus
  - Cf. †Quinqueloculina minuta
- Sigmomorphina
  - †Sigmomorphina schencki
- Uvigerina
  - †Uvigerina garzaensis

== Plants ==
=== Bryophytes ===
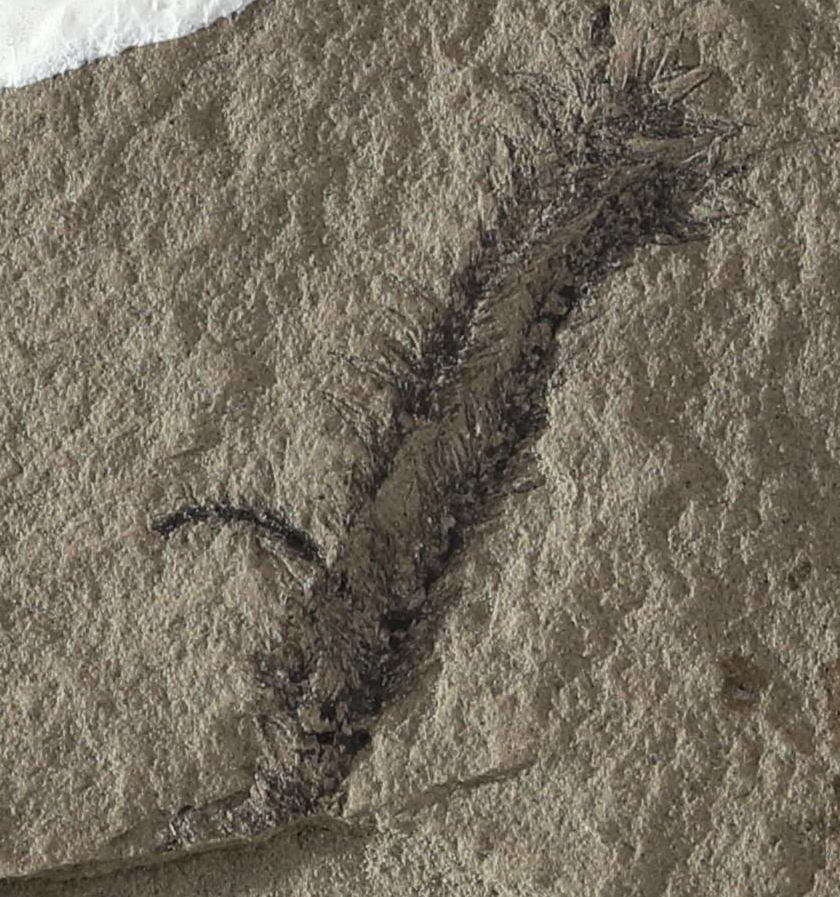
Hypnites patens moss holotype

- †Hypnites
  - †Hypnites brittoniae - type locality for species
  - †Hypnites knowltonii - type locality for species
  - †Hypnites patens - type locality for species
- †Polytrichites - type locality for genus
  - †Polytrichites spokanensis - type locality for species

=== "Ferns" (Polypodiophyta) ===
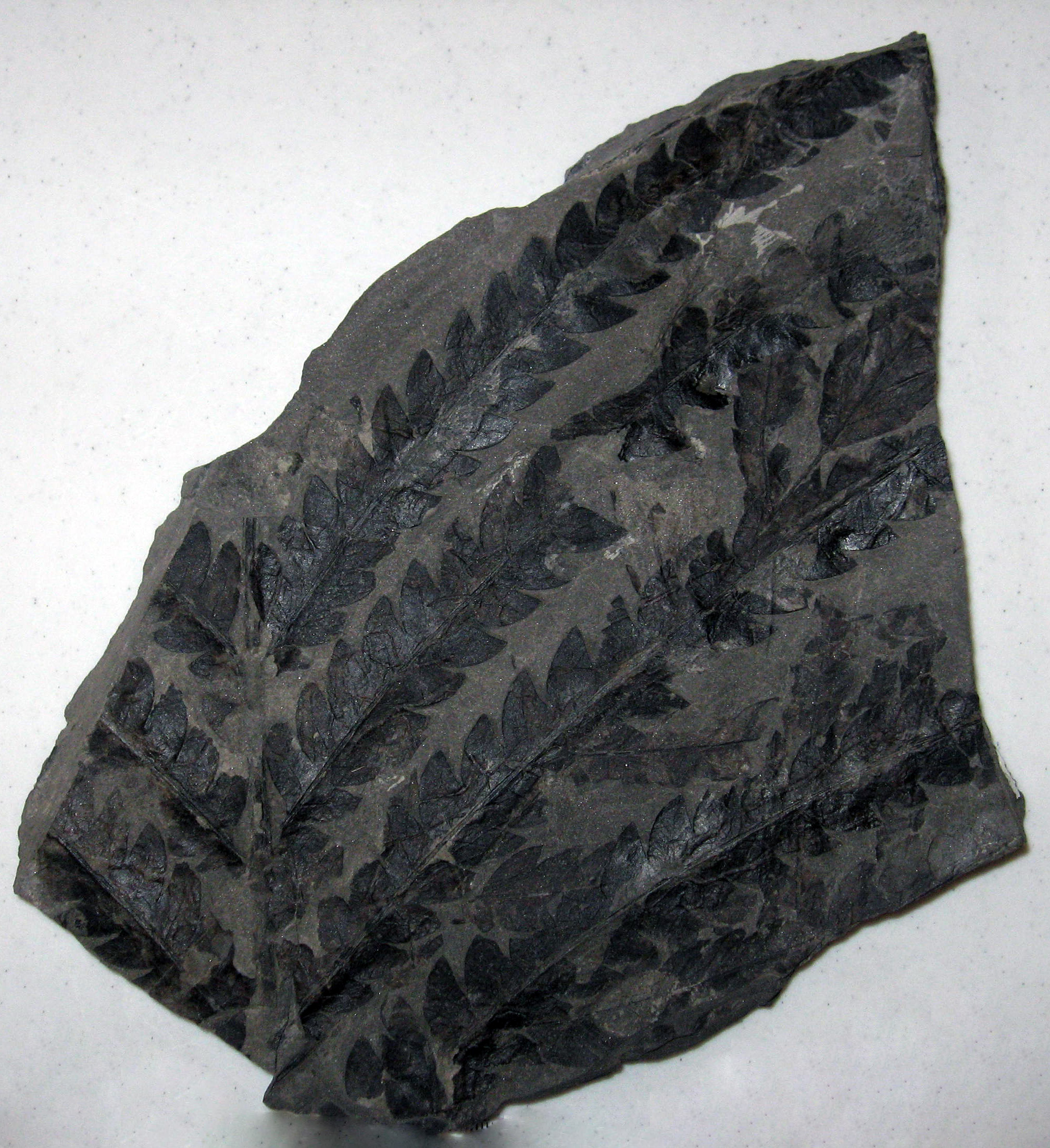
A fossilized frond found in Whatcom County from the Eocene tree fern Cyathea inequilateralis

- Adiantum
  - †Adiantum anastomosum - type locality for species
- †Allantodiopsis
  - †Allantodiopsis erosa
  - †Allantodiopsis pugetensis
  - undescribed species
- Anemia
  - †Anemia elongata
- Asplenium
  - Cf. †Asplenium delicata
- Athyrium
  - †Athyrium gracilium - type locality for species
- †Azolla
  - †Azolla primaeva
- Cheilanthes
  - Undescribed Late Pleistocene Manis Mastodon site subfossil(s)
- Cyathea
  - †Cyathea inequilateralis (syn = Cyathea pinnata)
- Cf. Cystopteris
  - Undescribed Ypresian Klondike Mountain Formation fossil(s)
- Danaea
  - †Danaea borealis - type locality for species
- Dennstaedtia
  - †Dennstaedtia christophelii - type locality for species
  - †Dennstaedtia delicata - type locality for species
- †Dryophyllum
  - †Dryophyllum pugetensis – type locality for species
- Dryopteris
  - †Dryopteris chuckanutensis - type locality for species
  - †Dryopteris gibbsi - type locality for species
  - †Dryopteris whatcomensis - type locality for species
- †Equisetum
  - †Equisetum alexanderi - type locality for species
  - †Equisetum newberryi - type locality for species
  - Undescribed Klondike Mountain Formation fossils
- Hymenophyllum
  - †Hymenophyllum axsmithii - type locality for species
- Lygodium
  - †Lygodium kaulfussi
  - Undescribed Ypresian Klondike Mountain Formation fossil
- Osmunda
  - †Osmunda occidentalis - type locality for species
  - †Osmunda wehrii - type locality for species
- Pteris
  - †Pteris whatcomensis -type locality for species
- Salpichlaena
  - †Salpichlaena serrata
- Salvinia
  - Cf. †Salvinia preauriculata
  - Undescribed Klondike Mountain Formation fossil

=== Lycophytes ===
- Lycopodium
  - †Lycopodium hesperium - type locality for species
  - Undescribed Late Miocene Vasa park Flora fossil
- Selaginella
  - Undescribed Klondike Mountain Formation fossil

=== Ginkgophytes ===
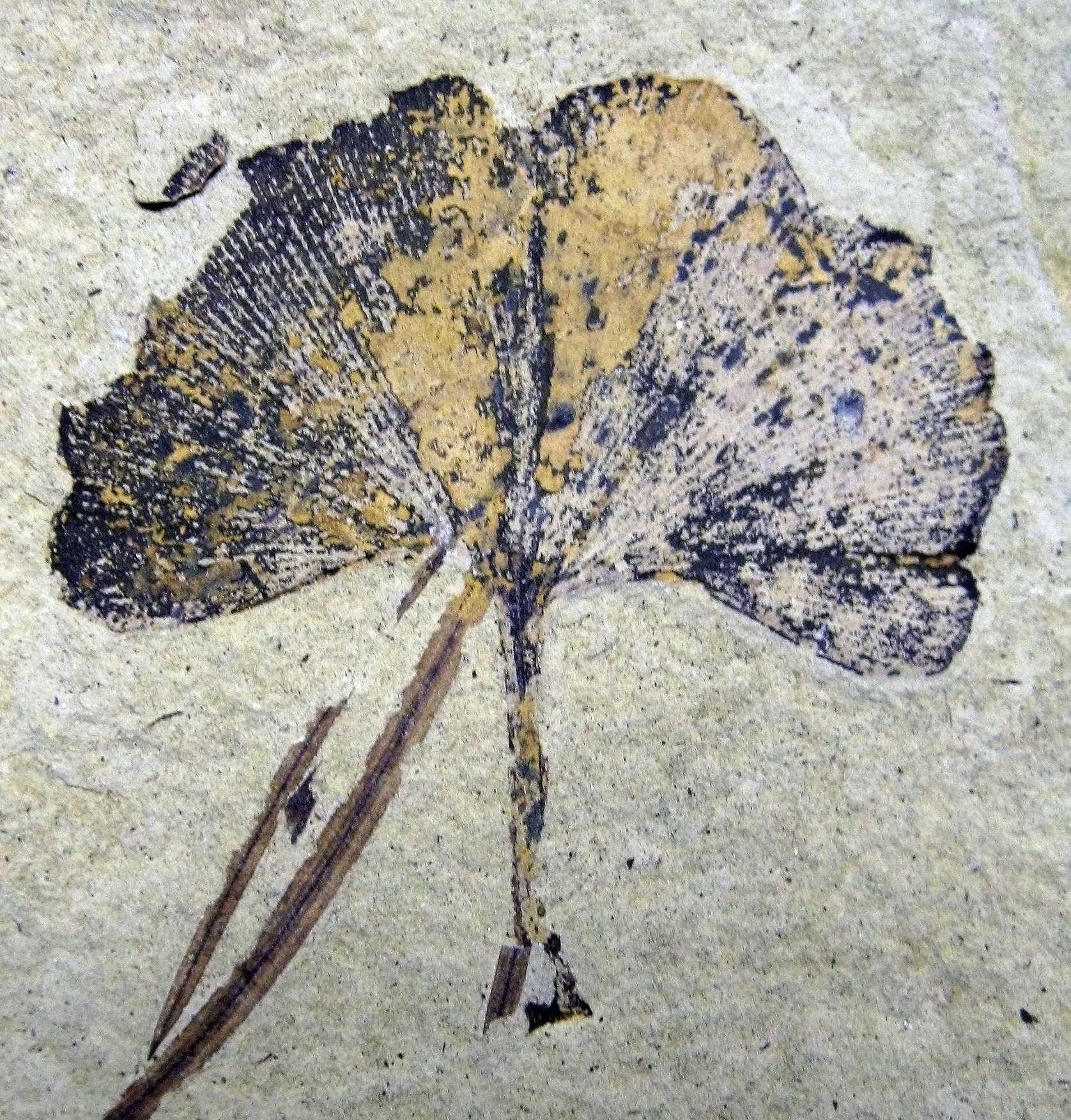
Ginkgo biloba Klondike Mountain Formation Ypresian, Republic

- Ginkgo
  - †Ginkgo adiantoides
  - †Ginkgo beckii - type locality of the species
  - Ginkgo biloba
  - †Ginkgo dissecta

=== Gnetophytes ===
- Ephedra
  - Undescribed Late Pleistocene Manis Mastodon site subfossil(s)

=== Pinophytes ===
==== Cupressaceae ====
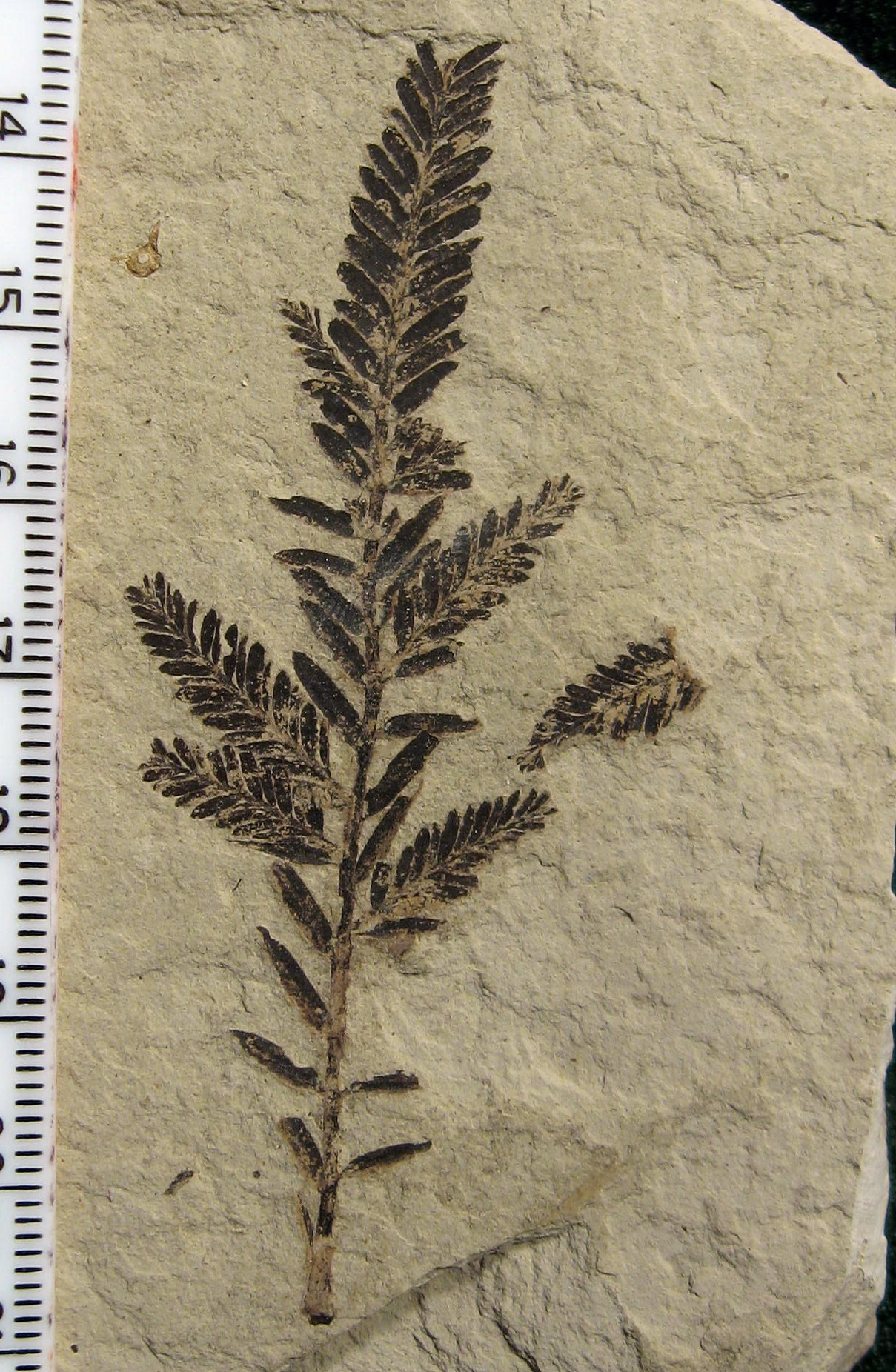
Metasequoia occidentalis branchlet

- Calocedrus
  - Undescribed Ypresian Klondike Mountain Formation fossil(s)
- Chamaecyparis
  - †Chamaecyparis linguaefolia
  - Undescribed Ypresian Klondike Mountain Formation fossil(s)
- Cryptomeria
  - Undescribed Ypresian Klondike Mountain Formation fossil(s)
- †Cupressinoxylon
  - Undescribed Middle Miocene Vantage fossils(s)
- Glyptostrobus
  - †Glyptostrobus nordenskiöldii
  - Undescribed Ypresian Klondike Mountain Formation fossil
- Metasequoia
  - †Metasequoia occidentalis
- Sequoia
  - †Sequoia affinis
- Taiwania
  - Undescribed Ypresian Klondike Mountain Formation fossil
- Taxodium
  - †Taxodium dubium
- †Taxodioxylon
  - †Taxodioxylon antiquum - type locality for the species
- Tetraclinis
  - Tetraclinis salicornioides var. praedecurrens - type locality for the species
- Thuja
  - †Thuja dimorpha
  - Undescribed Ypresian Klondike Mountain Formation fossil
- Thujopsis?
  - Undescribed Ypresian Klondike Mountain Formation fossil

==== Pinaceae ====
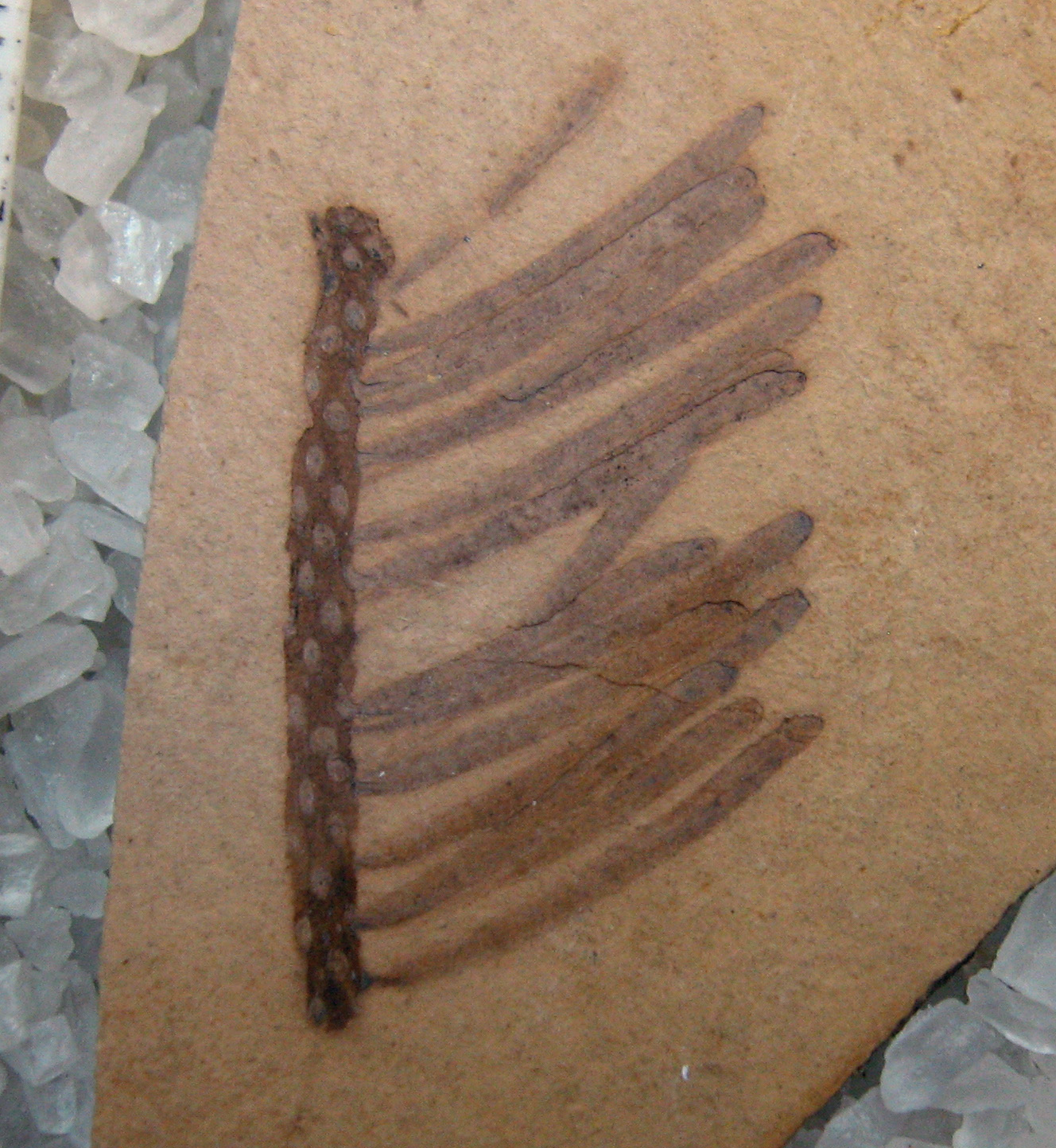
Abies milleri twig and foliage

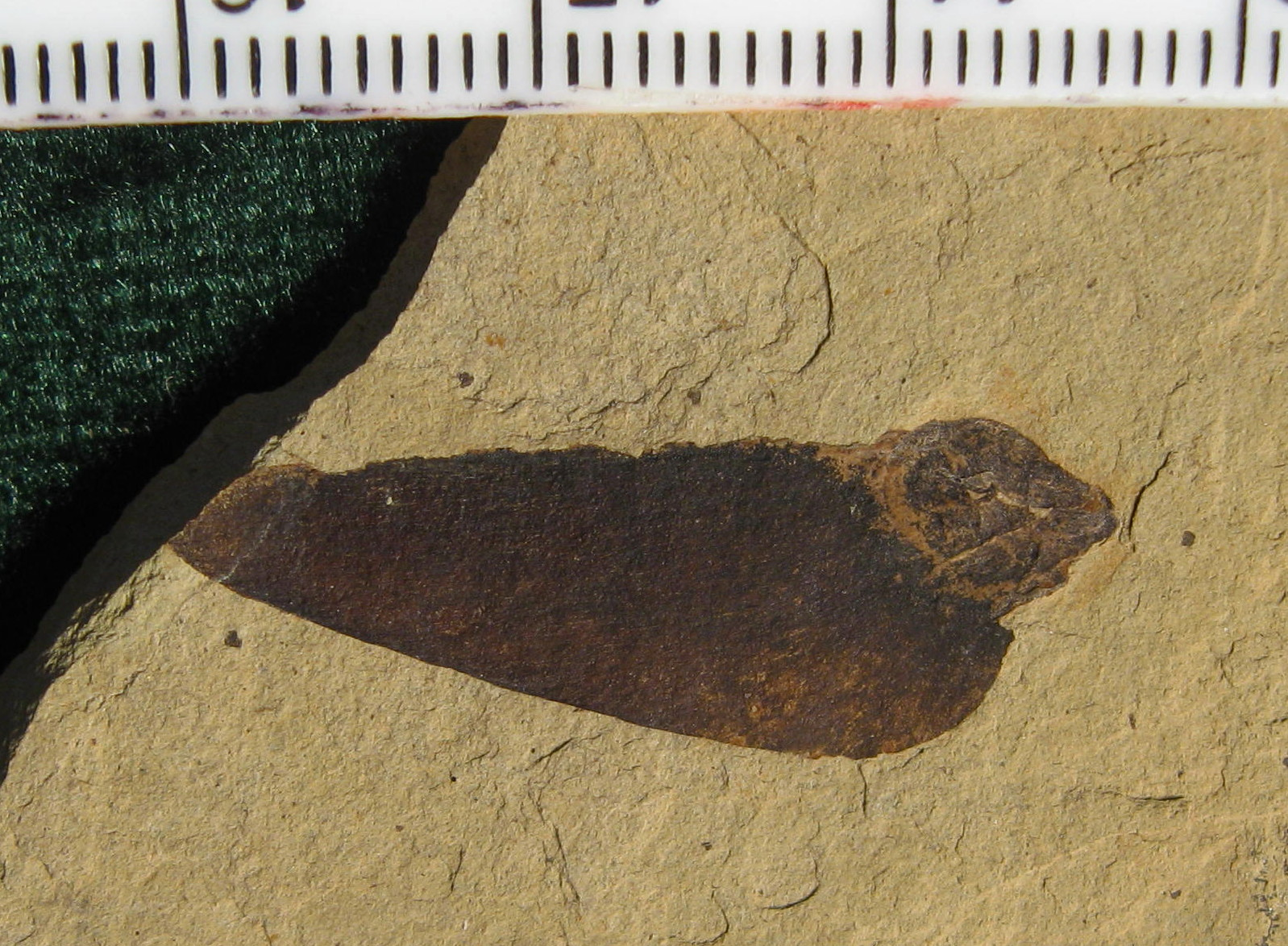
Pseudolarix wehrii wing seed

- Abies
  - Abies milleri - type locality for the species
  - Undescribed Miocene Vantage flora petrified woods.
  - Undescribed Late Pleistocene Manis Mastodon site subfossil(s)
- Cedrus
  - Undescribed middle Miocene Vasa Park fossil(s)
- Keteleeria
- †Keteleeria heterophylloides - type locality for the species
- Picea
  - †Picea tertiarum - type locality for the species
  - Undescribed Ypresian Klondike Mountain Formation fossils
- Pinus
  - †Pinus harneyana
  - †Pinus wheeleri
  - †Pinus latahensis
  - †Pinus macrophylla
  - †Pinus monticolensis
  - †Pinus tetrafolia
- Pseudolarix
  - †Pseudolarix wehrii
- Pseudotsuga
  - †Pseudotsuga pseudotsugae - type locality for the species
- Tsuga
  - †Tsuga latahensis - type locality for the species

==== Sciadopityaceae ====
- Sciadopitys
  - Undescribed Klondike Mountain Formation fossil

==== Taxaceae ====
- Amentotaxus
  - undescribed Ypresian Klondike Mountain Formation fossil(s)
- Cephalotaxus
  - †Cephalotaxus bonseri - type locality for species
  - Undescribed Ypresian Klondike Mountain Formation fossil(s)
- Taxus
  - Undescribed Ypresian Klondike Mountain Formation fossil
  - Undescribed Middle Miocene Vantage fossils(s)

=== Angiosperms ===
==== Plants A ====
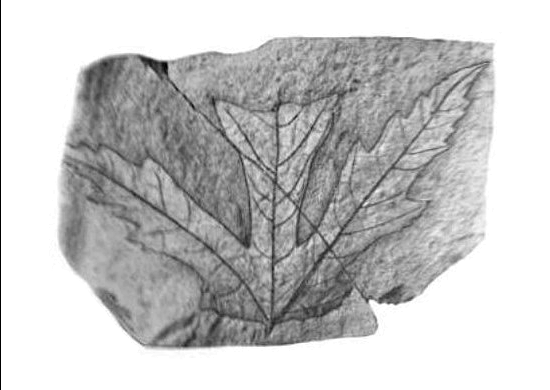
Fossilized leaf found near Spokane; the holotype specimen of the Oligocene-Miocene maple tree Acer chaneyi

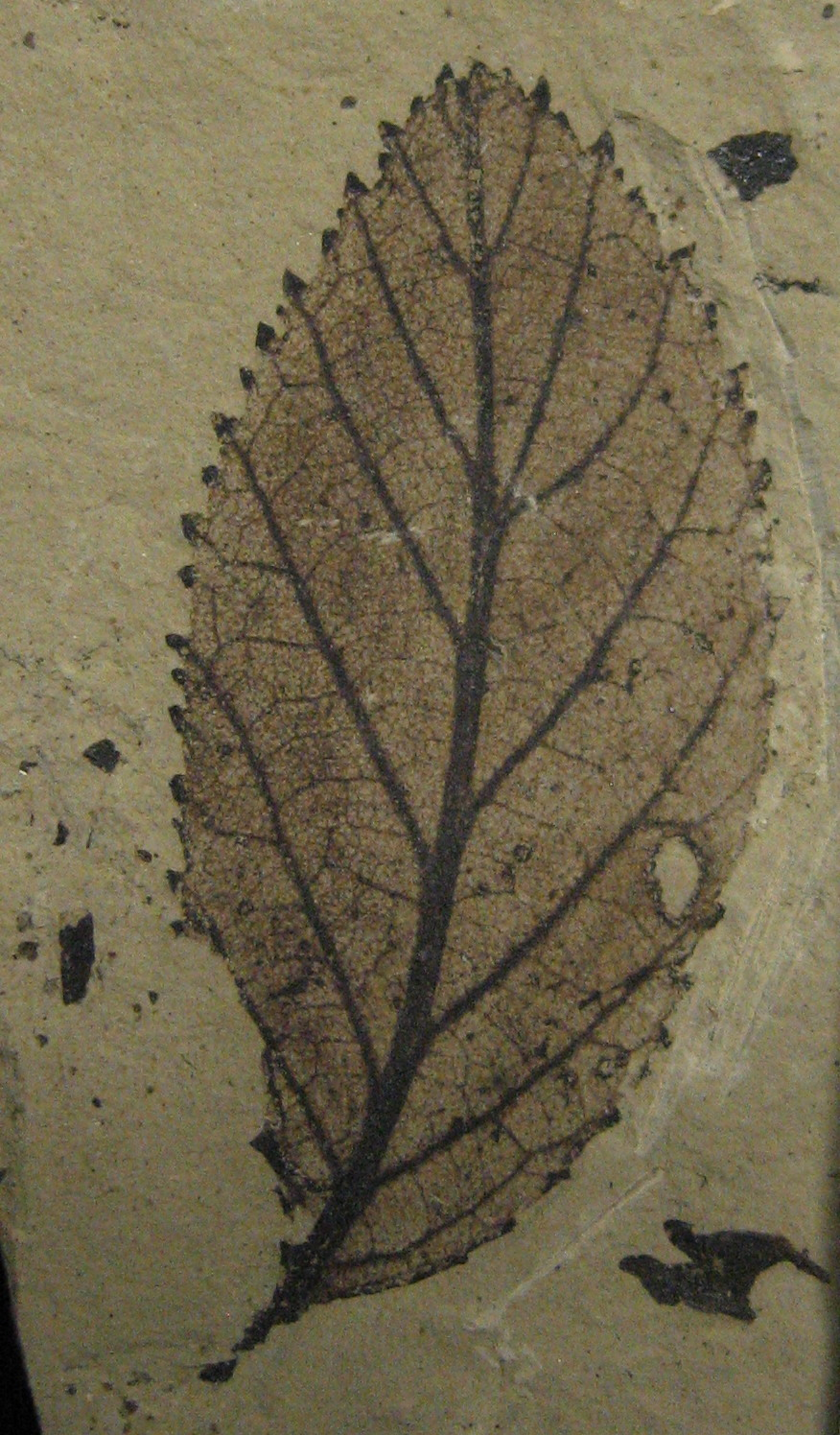
Fossilized leaf found in Republic from the Eocene Alder species Alnus parvifolia

- Acer
  - †"Acer" arcticum
  - †Acer beckianum - type locality for species
  - †Acer bendirei
  - †Acer berkhoffii - type locality for species (syn =Aceroxylon pennsylvanicum)
  - †Acer browni
  - †Acer chaneyi
  - †Acer hillsi - type locality for species
  - †Acer knolli - type locality for species
  - †Acer latahense - type locality for species
  - †Acer medianum
  - †Acer niklasi
  - †Acer olearyi - type locality for species
  - †Acer puratanum - type locality for species
  - †Acer republicense - type locality for species
  - †Acer spitzi - type locality for species
  - †Acer stonebergae
  - †Acer tigilense
  - †Acer toradense - type locality for species
  - †Acer washingtonense - type locality for species
  - †Acer wehri - type locality for the species
  - †Acer whitebirdense
- Aesculus
  - †Aesculus hankinsii - type locality for species
  - Undescribed Ypresian Klondike Mountain Formation fossil(s)
- Albizzia
  - †"Albizzia vantagiensis" - type locality for the species
- †Allophylus
  - Cf. †Allophylus duktothensis
- Alnus
  - †Alnus carpinoides
  - †Alnus corrallina
  - †Alnus kluckingi - type locality for species
  - †Alnus operia
  - †Alnus parvifolia - type locality for species
  - †Alnus relatus - type locality for species
- Amelanchier
  - undescribed Ypresian Klondike Mountain Formation fossil(s)
- †Anacardites
  - †Anacardites franklinensis – type locality for species
- Aralia
  - undescribed Ypresian Klondike Mountain Formation fossil(s)
- †Araliaceoxylon - type locality for genus
  - †Araliaceoxylon miocenica - type locality for the species
- Arbutus
  - †Arbutus idahoensis - type locality for species
  - undescribed Ypresian Klondike Mountain Formation fossil(s)
- Arceuthobium
  - Undescribed Late Pleistocene Manis Mastodon site subfossil(s)
- Arctostaphylos
  - Arctostaphylos uva-ursi
- Artemisia
  - Undescribed Late Pleistocene Manis Mastodon site subfossil(s)
- †Averrhoites
  - Undescribed Ypresian Klondike Mountain Formation fossil(s)

==== Plants B ====
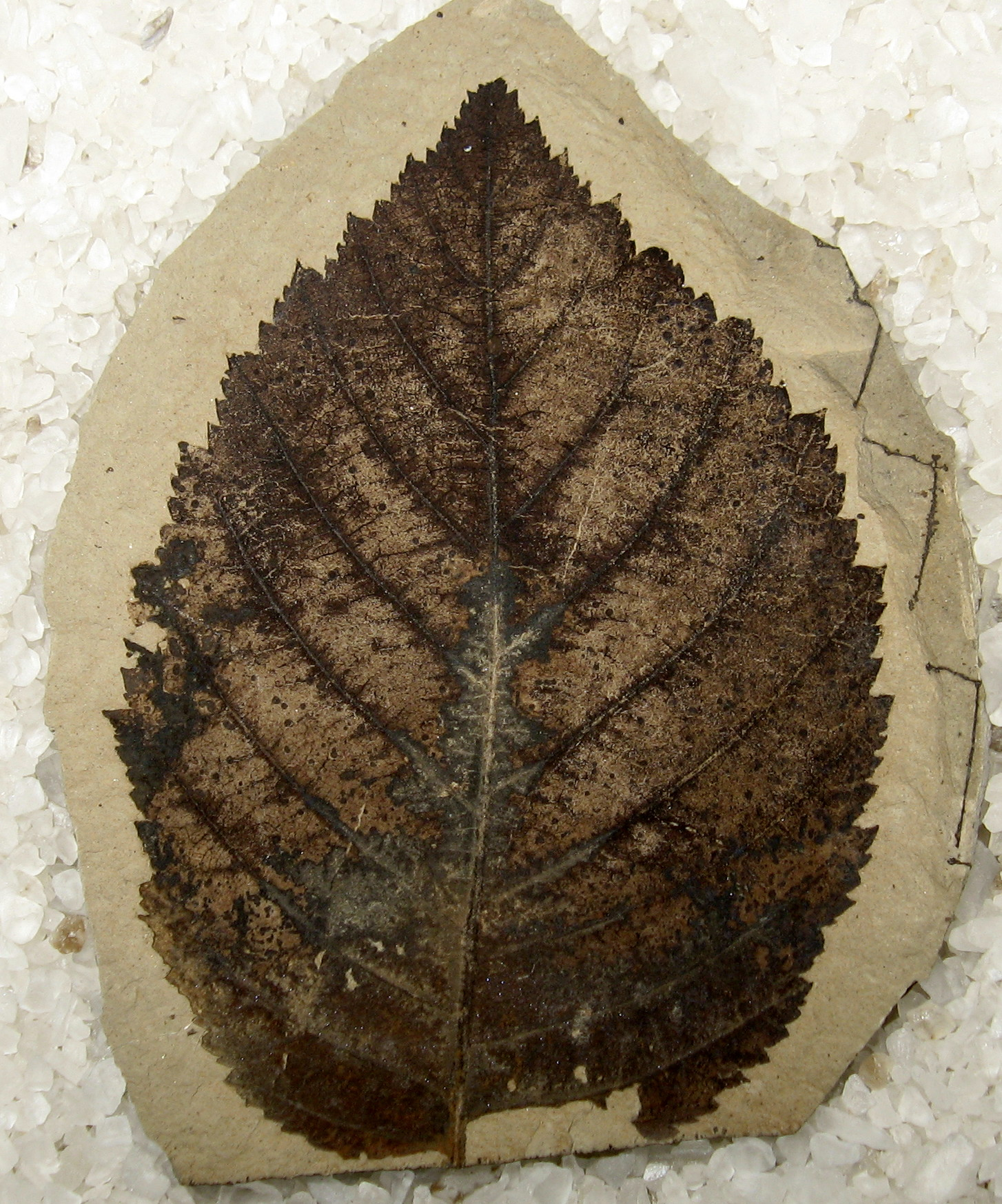
Fossilized leaf found in Republic from the Eocene to birch species Betula leopoldae

- †Barghoornia - type locality for genus
  - †Barghoornia oblongifolia - type locality for species
- Berberis
  - Undescribed Late Pleistocene Manis Mastodon site subfossil
- Betula
  - †Betula heteromorpha
  - †Betula largei
  - †Betula leopoldae - type locality for species
  - †Betula scammonii - type locality for species
  - Cf. Betula papyrifera
- †Bohlenia
  - †Bohlenia americana - type locality for species
- Cf. Boniodendron
  - †"Koelreuteria" arnoldii - referred to Cf. Boniodendron without rename
- Botrychium
  - Undescribed Late Pleistocene Manis Mastodon site subfossil
- Cf. Bursera
  - Undescribed Eocene Puget Group fossil

==== Plants C ====
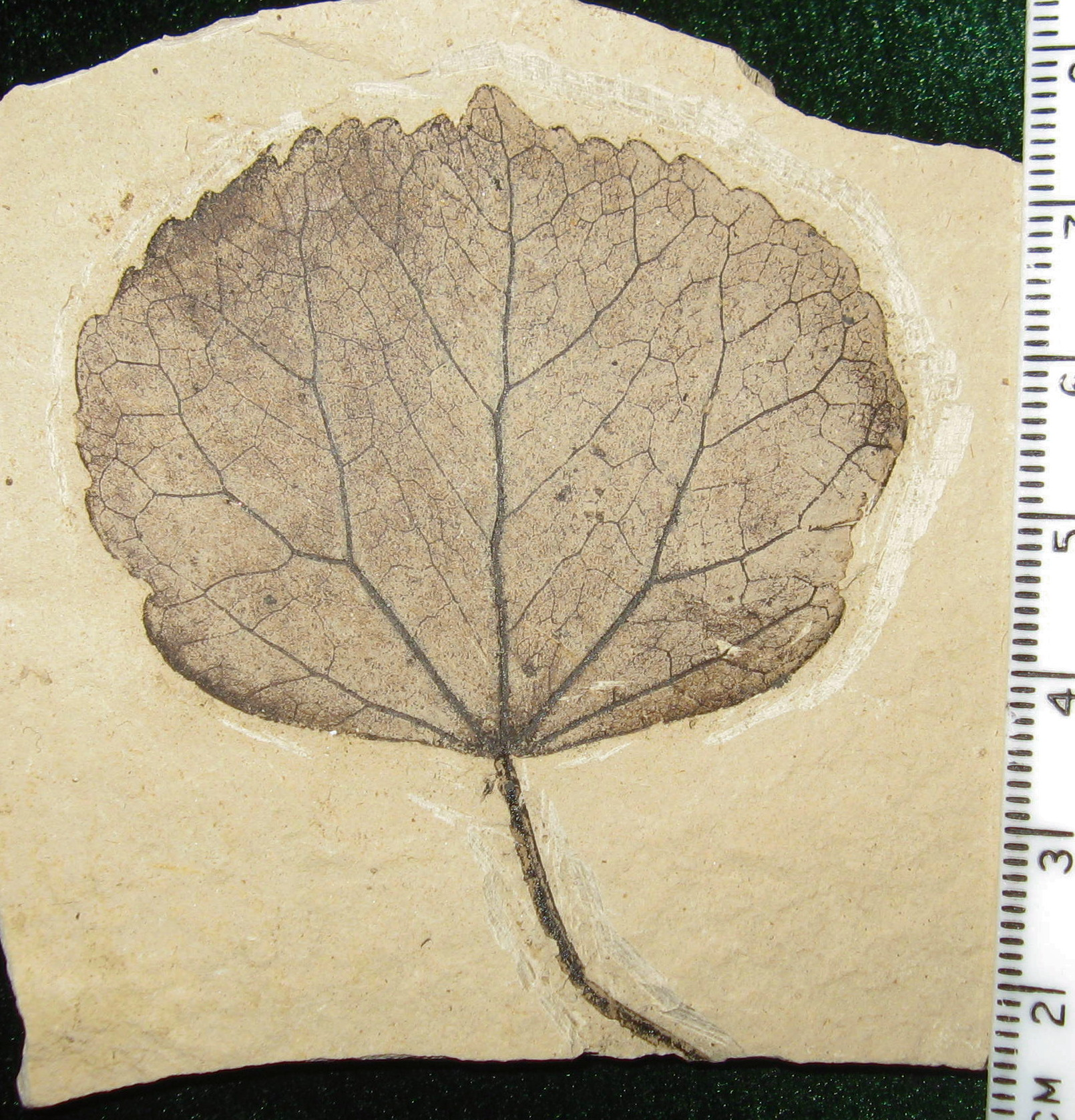
Fossilized leaf found in Republic from the Eocene katsura species Cercidiphyllum obtritum

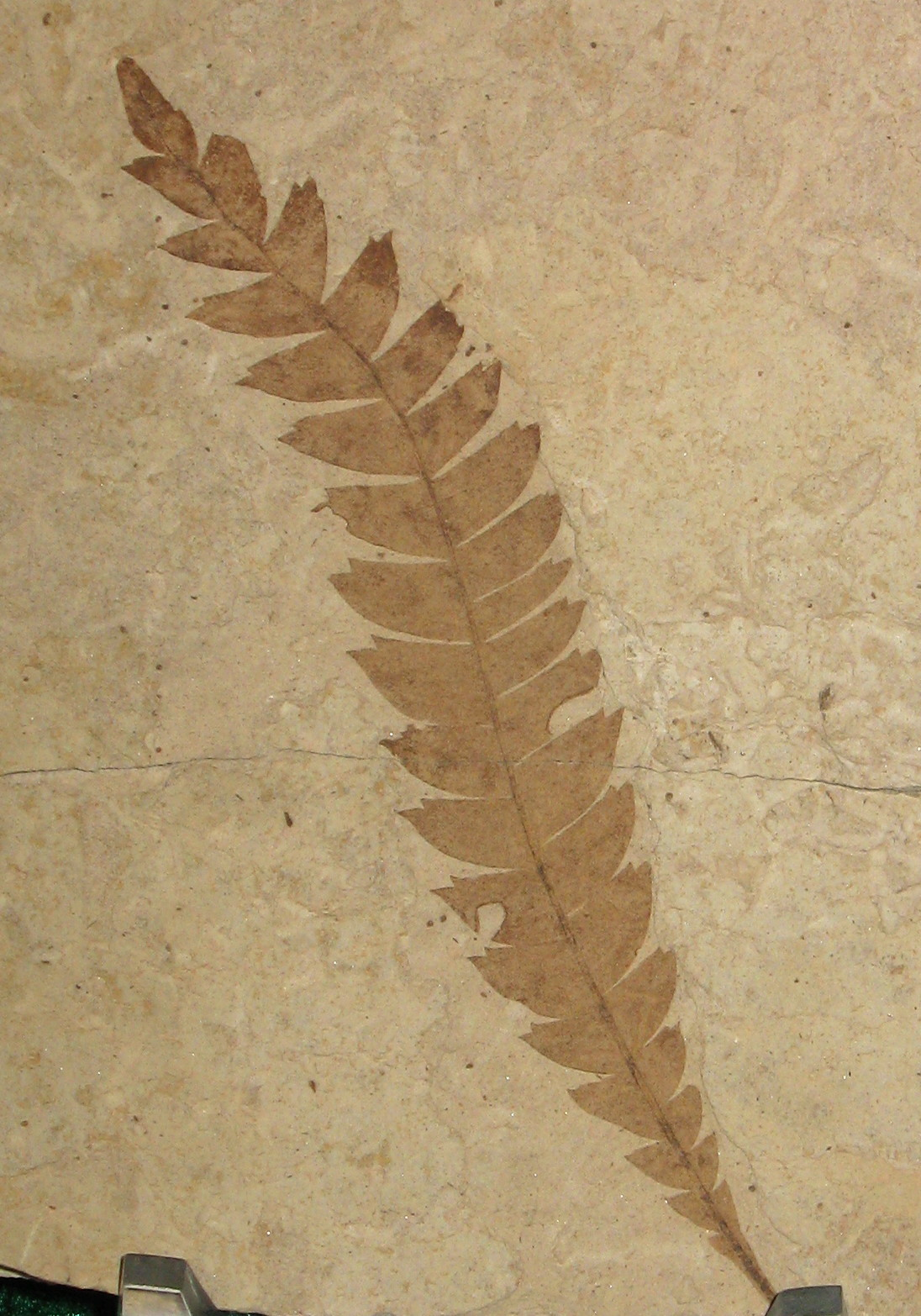
Fossilized leaf found in Republic from the Eocene sweetfern species Comptonia columbiana

- Caesalpinia
  - †Caesalpinia spokanensis - type locality for species (syn= Meibomites lucens)
- †Calkinsia - type locality of genus
  - †Calkinsia franklinensis - type locality for species
  - Cf. †Calkinsia plafkeri
- †Calycites
  - †Calycites ardtunensis
- Calycocarpum
  - Undescribed Ypresian Klondike Mountain Formation fossil(s)
- Camellia
  - †Camellia multiforma
- Carex
  - Undescribed Late Pleistocene Manis Mastodon site subfossil
- Carpinus
  - †Carpinus perryae
- Carya
  - †Carya cashmanensis – type locality for species
  - †Carya pugetensis - type locality for species
  - †Carya washingtonensis - type locality for species
  - Undescribed Ypresian Klondike Mountain Formation fossil(s)
- Castanea
  - †Castanea orientalis
- †Castaneophyllum
  - Undescribed Ypresian Klondike Mountain Formation fossil(s)
- Castanopsis
  - †Castanopsis franklinensis – type locality for species
- †Cedrelospermum
  - Undescribed Ypresian Klondike Mountain Formation fossil(s)
- Celastrus
  - †Celastrus spokanensis
- Ceratophyllum
  - Ceratophyllum demersum
- Cercidiphyllum
  - †Cercidiphyllum crenatum
  - †Cercidiphyllum obtritum
  - †Cercidiphyllum piperoides
- Chenopodium
  - Undescribed Late Pleistocene Manis Mastodon site subfossil(s)
- Cladrastis
  - †Cladrastis pugetensis – type locality for species
- Clematis
  - Undescribed Ypresian Klondike Mountain Formation fossil(s)
- Cocculus
  - Cf. †Cocculus flabella
- Comptonia
  - †Comptonia columbiana
  - †Comptonia hesperia
- Cornus
  - Cornus sericea (syn=Cornus stolonifera)
  - Undescribed Ypresian Klondike Mountain Formation fossil(s)
- Corylopsis
  - †Corylopsis reedae - type locality for species
- Corylus
  - †Corylus johnsonii
- Craigia
  - Undescribed Ypresian Klondike Mountain Formation fossil(s)
- Cf. Crataegus
  - Undescribed Ypresian Klondike Mountain Formation fossil(s)
- †Cruciptera
  - †Cruciptera simsonii

==== Plants D ====
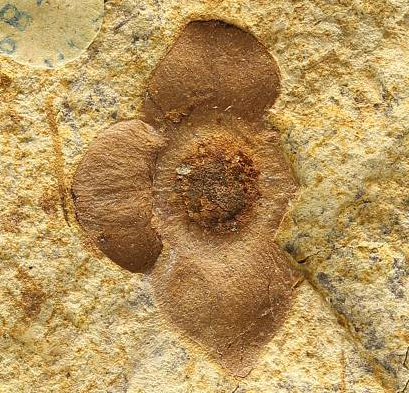
Diospyros oregoniana

- Decodon
  - Undescribed Ypresian Klondike Mountain Formation fossil
- †Deviacer
  - Undescribed Ypresian Klondike Mountain Formation fossil
- †Dichrostachyoxylon
  - †Dichrostachyoxylon occidentale - type locality for species
- †Dillhoffia
  - †Dillhoffia cachensis
- Dilodendron
  - †Dilodendron boreale - type locality for species
- Diospyros
  - †Diospyros oregoniana
- †Diplodipelta
  - †Diplodipelta miocenica
- Dipteronia
  - †Dipteronia brownii

==== Plants E ====
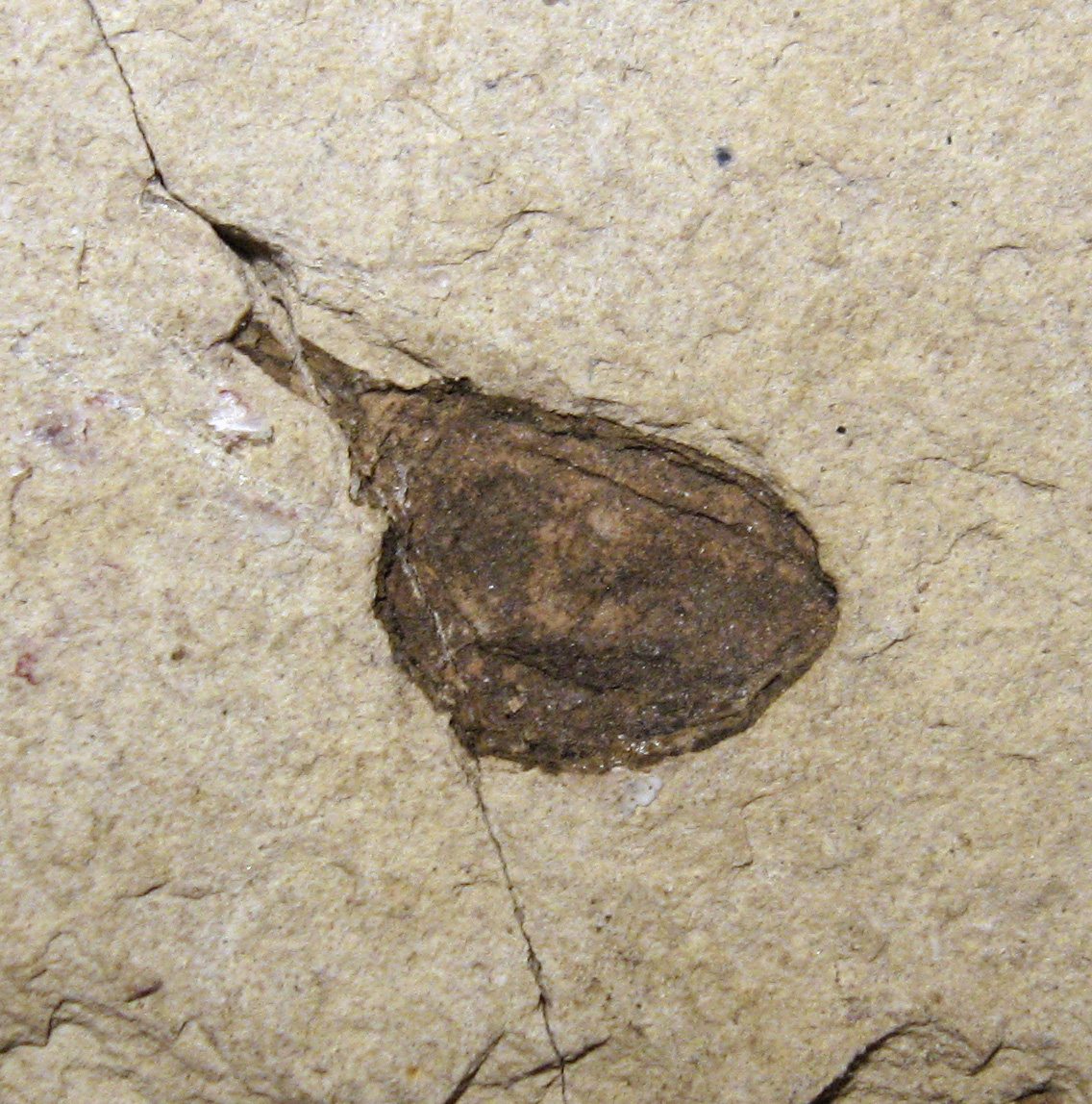
Eucommia montana fruit

- Eleocharis
  - undescribed Late PLeistocene Manis Mastodon site subfossil
- Eucommia
  - †Eucommia montana
- Euonymus
  - †Euonymus pacificus - type locality for species
- Exbucklandia
  - Exbucklandia oregonensis

==== Plants F ====
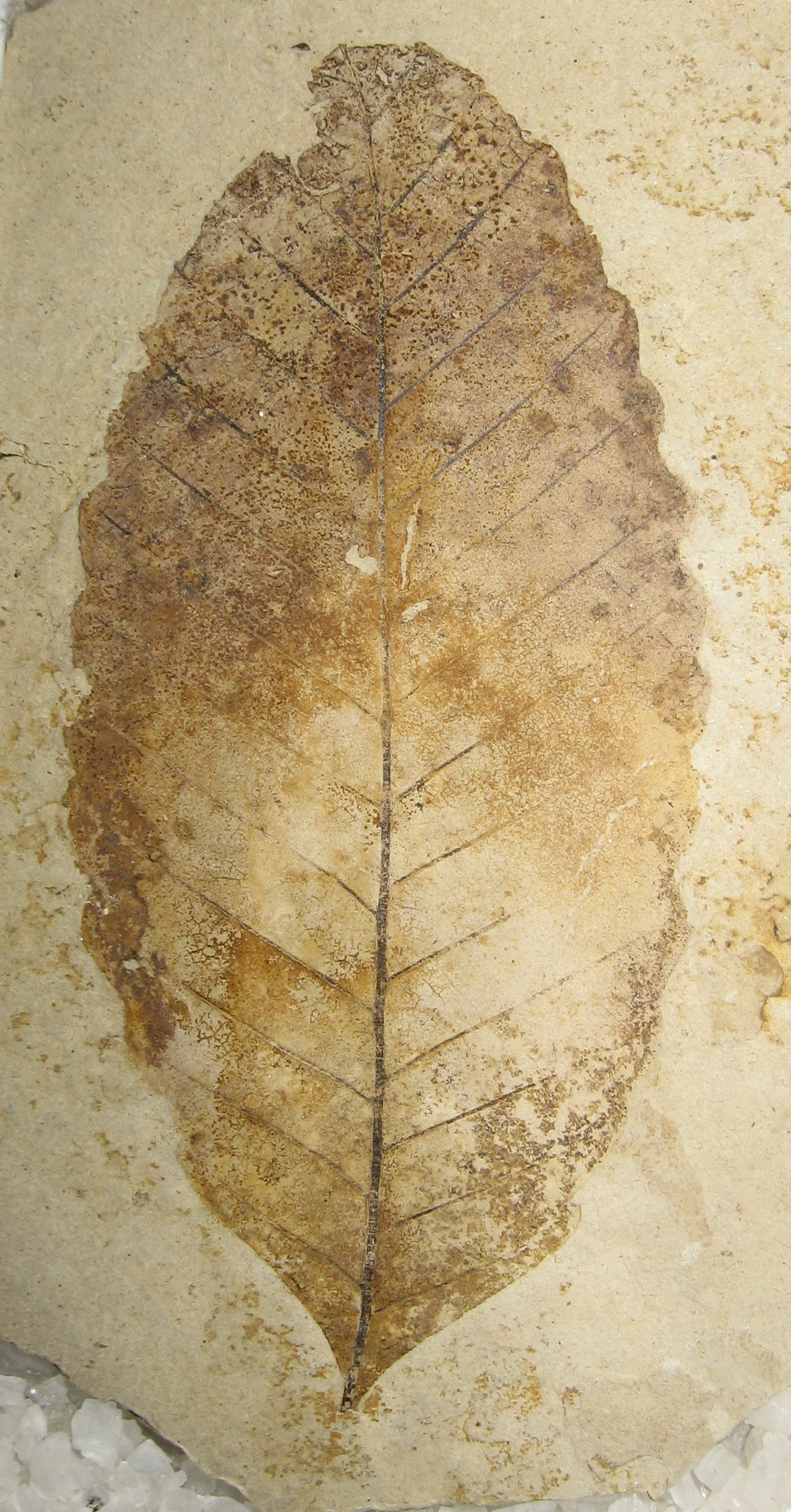
Fagopsis undulata Klondike Mountain Formation Ypresian, Republic

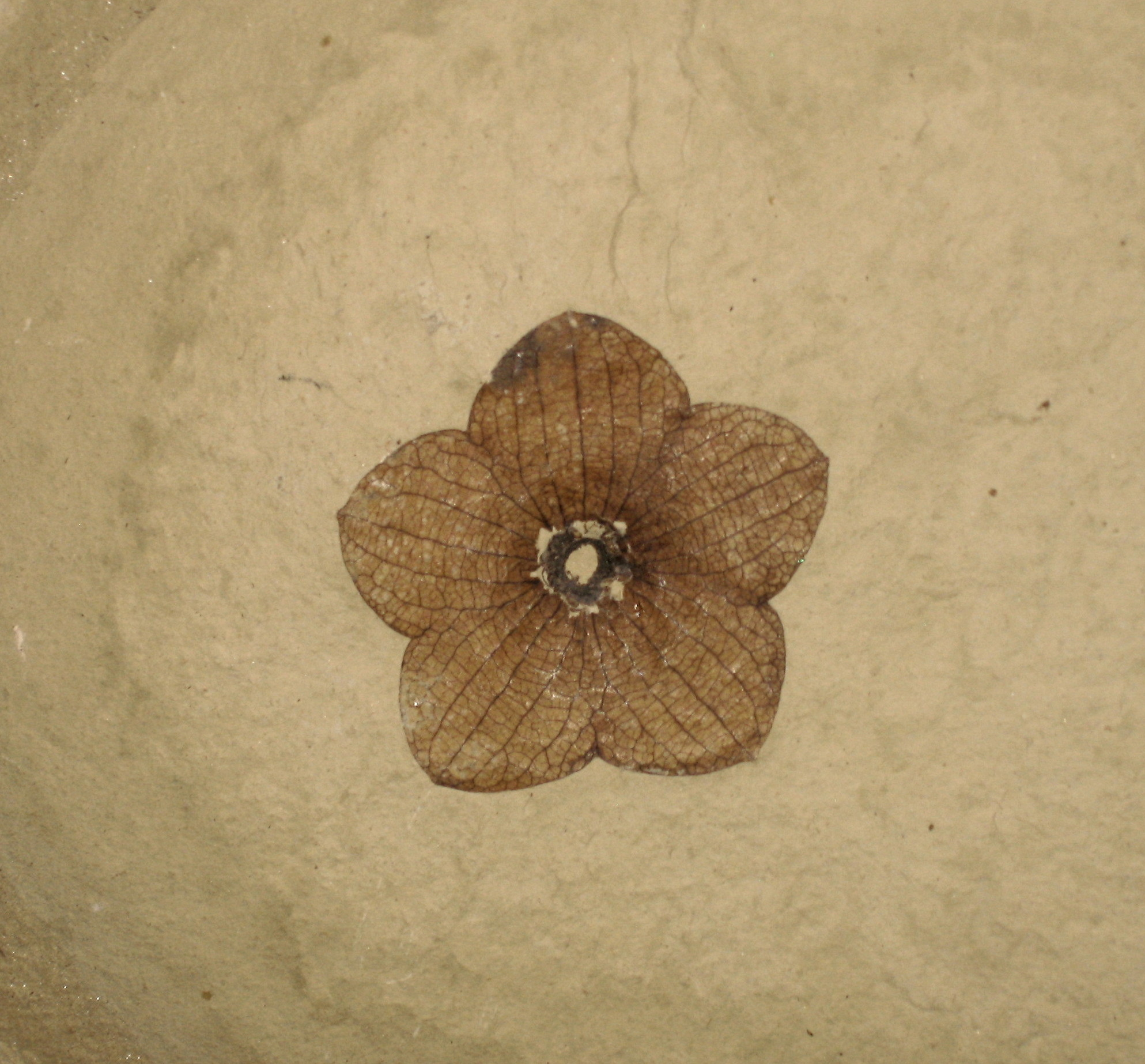
Fossilized calyx found in Republic from the Eocene mallow species Florissantia quilchenensis

- †Fagopsis
  - †Fagopsis undulata
- Fagus
  - †Fagus langevinii
  - †Fagus manosii - type locality for species
  - †Fagus washoensis
- †Florissantia
  - †Florissantia quilchenensis
- Fothergilla
  - †Fothergilla malloryi - type locality for species
- †Fraxinus
  - †Fraxinus dayana
  - †Fraxinus macropunctatum - type locality for species
  - †Fraxinus washingtoniana - type locality for species (syn Diospyros washingtoniana)
  - Cf. †Fraxinus yubaensis

==== Plants G ====
- Galium
  - Undescribed Late Pleistocene Manis Mastodon site subfossil
- Gaultheria
  - †Gaultheria pacifica - type locality for species
- Gleditsioxylon
  - †Gleditsioxylon columbianum - type locality for species (syn Gleditsia columbiana)
- Gordonia
  - †Gordonia idahoensis
- †Goweria - type locality of genus
  - †Goweria dilleri
  - †Goweria linearis - type locality for species

==== Plants H ====
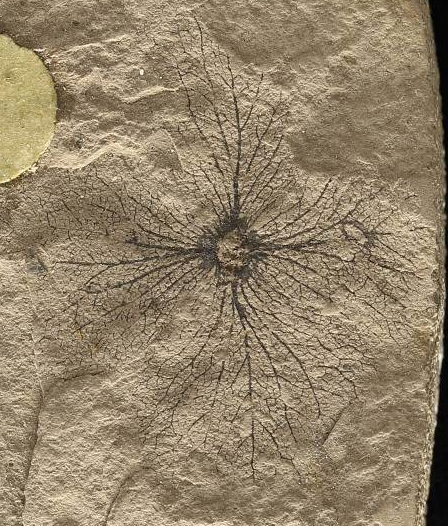
Hydrangea knowltoni

- Halesia
  - †Halesia columbiana - type locality for species
- †Hamamelidoxylon
  - †Hamamelidoxylon beckii - type locality for species
  - †Hamamelidoxylon suzukii - type locality for species
- †Hamamelites
  - Cf. †Hamamelites voyana
- Hesperomeles
  - Tentatively identified undescribed Ypresian Klondike Mountain Formation fossil
- Hibiscus
  - Undescribed Ypresian Klondike Mountain Formation fossil
- Hippuris
  - Hippuris vulgaris
- Hydrangea
  - †Hydrangea bendirei -
  - †Hydrangea knowltoni - type locality for species
  - Undescribed Ypresian Klondike Mountain Formation fossil
- Hypserpa
  - †Hypserpa cashmanensis - type locality for species
  - †Hypserpa franklinensis - type locality for species

==== Plants I ====
- Ilex
  - †Ilex fulva
  - Cf. Ilex opaca
  - Undescribed Ypresian Klondike Mountain Formation fossil
- Itea
  - Undescribed Ypresian Klondike Mountain Formation

==== Plants J ====
- Juglans
  - Undescribed Ypresian Klondike Mountain Formation fossil

==== Plants K ====
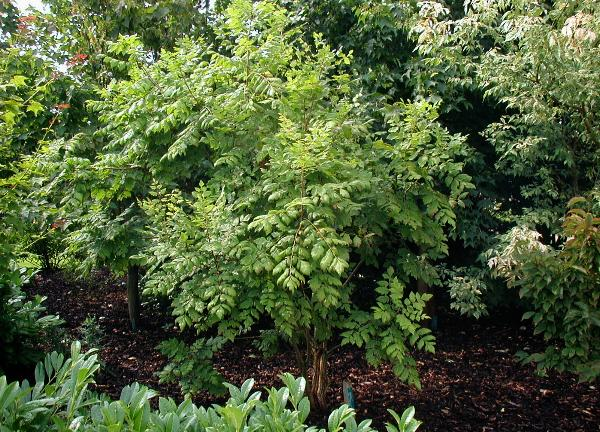
A living Koelreuteria tree

- Kadsura
  - Undescribed Ypresian Klondike Mountain Formation fossil
- Koelreuteria
  - †Koelreuteria dilcheri

==== Plants L ====
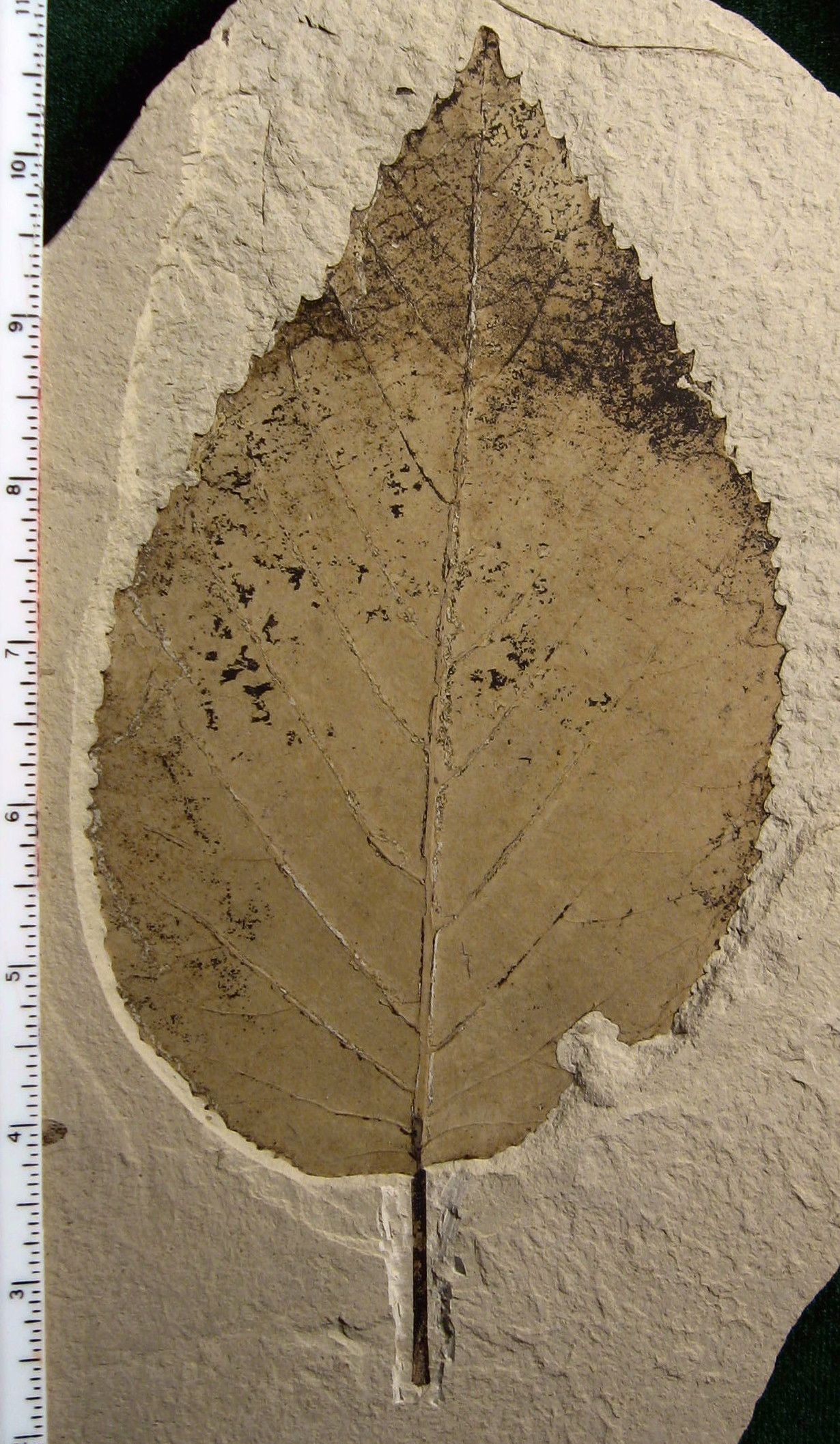
Langeria magnifica Klondike Mountain Formation Ypresian Republic

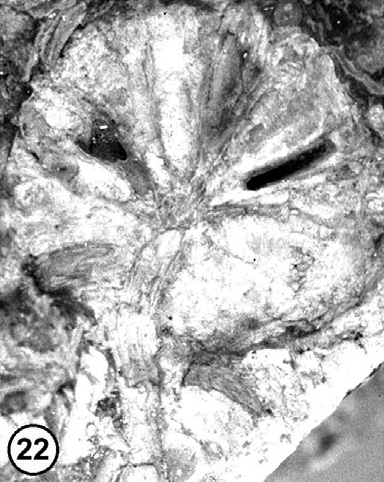
Liquidambar changii Yakima Canyon Flora Miocene Yakima Canyon

- †Langeranthus - type locality for genus
  - †Langeranthus dillhoffiorum - type locality for species
- †Langeria – type locality for genus
  - †Langeria magnifica – type locality for species
- †Laurophyllum
  - †Laurophyllum grandis
- †Leguminosites
  - †Leguminosites bonseri
- Lemna
  - Undescribed Late Pleistocene Manis Mastodon site subfossil
- Cf. Leucothoe
  - Undescribed Ypresian Klondike Mountain Formation fossil
- Liquidambar
  - †Liquidambar changii
  - †Liquidambar pachyphyllum
  - Cf. †Liquidambar hisauchii
- †Litseaphyllum
  - Undescribed Ypresian Klondike Mountain Formation fossil
- Liriodendron
  - †Liriodendron hesperia – type locality for species
- †Litseaphyllum
  - Undescribed Ypresian Klondike Mountain Formation fossil
- Lysichiton?
  - †"Lysichiton washingtonense" – type locality for species

==== Plants M ====
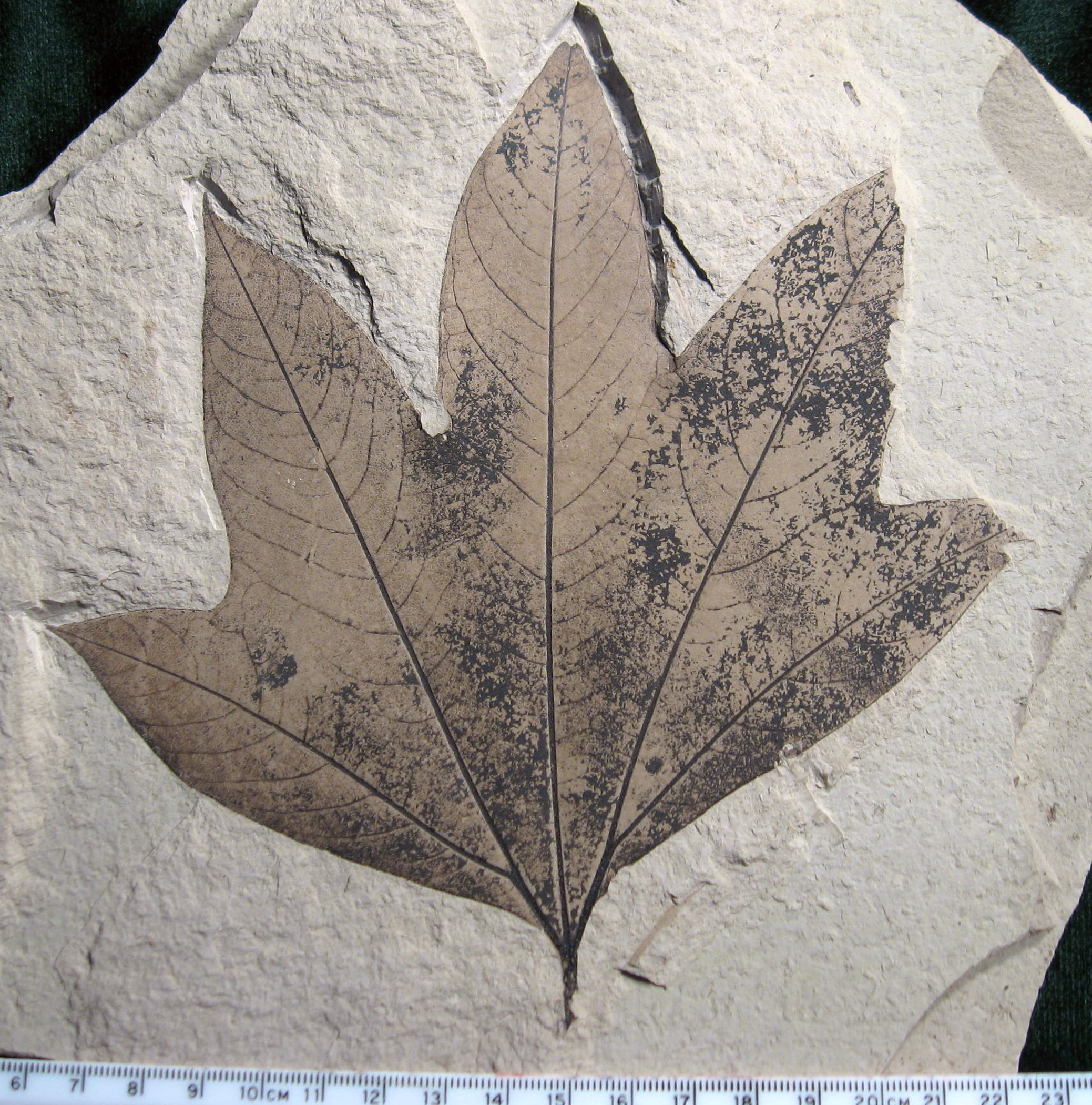
Macginitiea gracilis Klondike Mountain Formation Republic

- Macaranga
  - †Macaranga pugetensis – type locality for species
- †Macclintockia
  - †Macclintockia pugetensis – type locality for species
- †Macginicarpa
  - Undescribed Ypresian Klondike Mountain Formation fossil
- †Macginitiea
  - Cf. †Macginitea angustilobia
  - †Macginitiea gracilis
- Machilus
  - †Machilus americana - type locality for species
  - †Machilus asiminoides - type locality for species
- Magnolia
  - †Magnolia dayana
  - †Magnolia latahensis - type locality of species
  - Undescribed Early Miocene Douglas Canyon Formation fossil
  - Undescribed Ypresian Klondike Mountain Formation fossil
- Malus
  - Undescribed Ypresian Klondike Mountain Formation fossil
- Meliosma
  - Undescribed Ypresian Klondike Mountain Formation fossil
- †Menispermites
  - Cf. †Menispermites parvareolatus
- Mentzelia
  - †Mentzelia occidentalis - type locality for species
- Menyanthes
  - Undescribed Late Pleistocene Manis Mastodon site subfossil
- Morus
  - Undescribed Ypresian Klondike Mountain Formation fossil
- Myriophyllum
  - Myriophyllum spicatum

==== Plants N ====
- Neviusia
  - Undescribed Ypresian Klondike Mountain Formation fossil
- †Nordenskioldia
  - †Nordenskioldia interglacialis
  - Undescribed Ypresian Klondike Mountain Formation fossil
- Nuphar
  - †Nuphar carlquistii
- Nyssa
  - †Nyssa eydei - type locality for species
  - †Nyssa hesperia - type locality for species
  - †Nyssa magnifica - type locality for species

==== Plants O ====
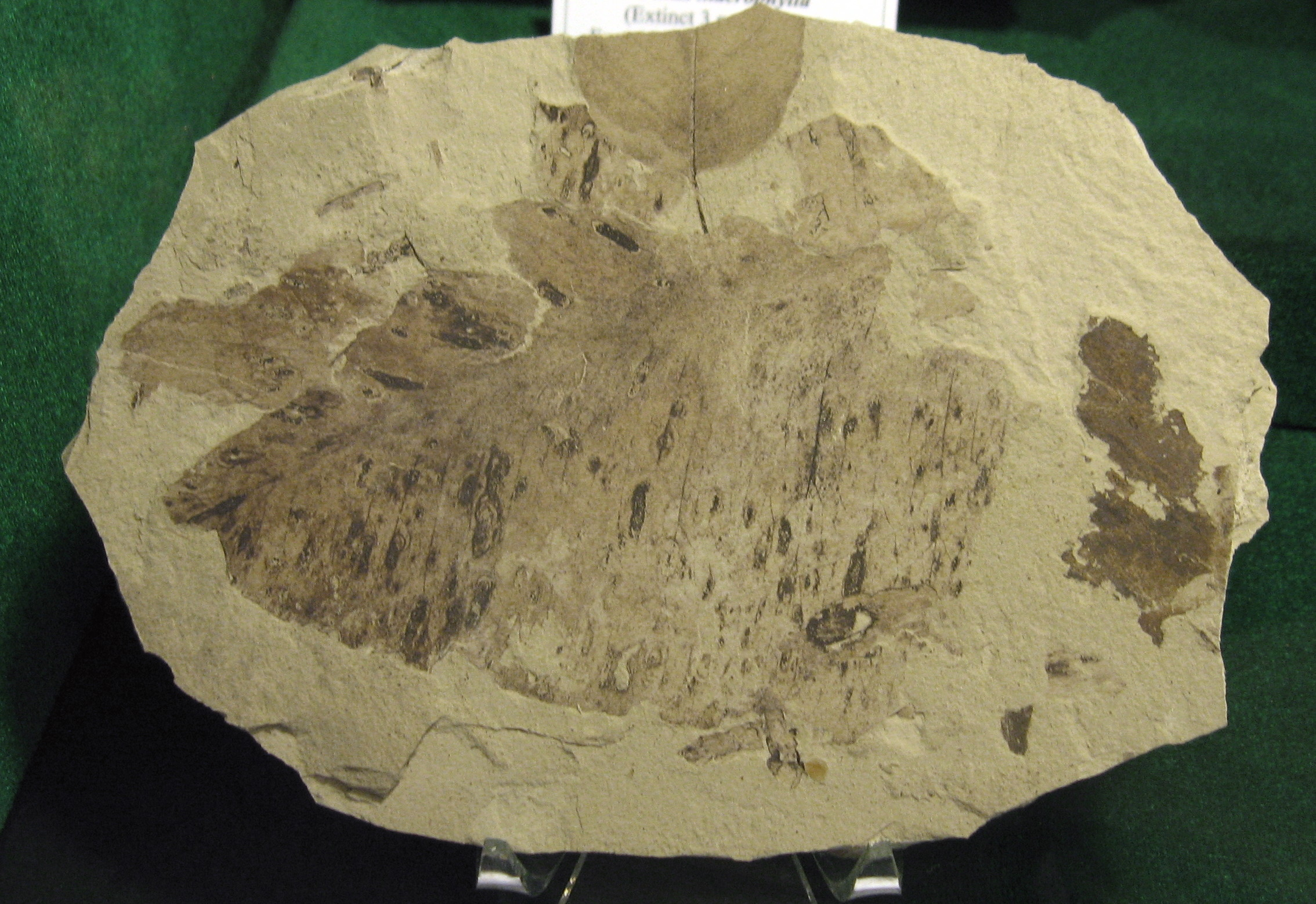
Fossilized leaf found in Ferry County belonging to the Eocene golden-club Orontium wolfei

- Ocotea
  - Undescribed Ypresian Klondike Mountain Formation fossil
- Oemleria
  - †Oemleria janhartfordae - type locality for species
- Orontium
  - †Orontium wolfei - type locality for species
- Ostrya
  - †Ostrya oregoniana

==== Plants P ====
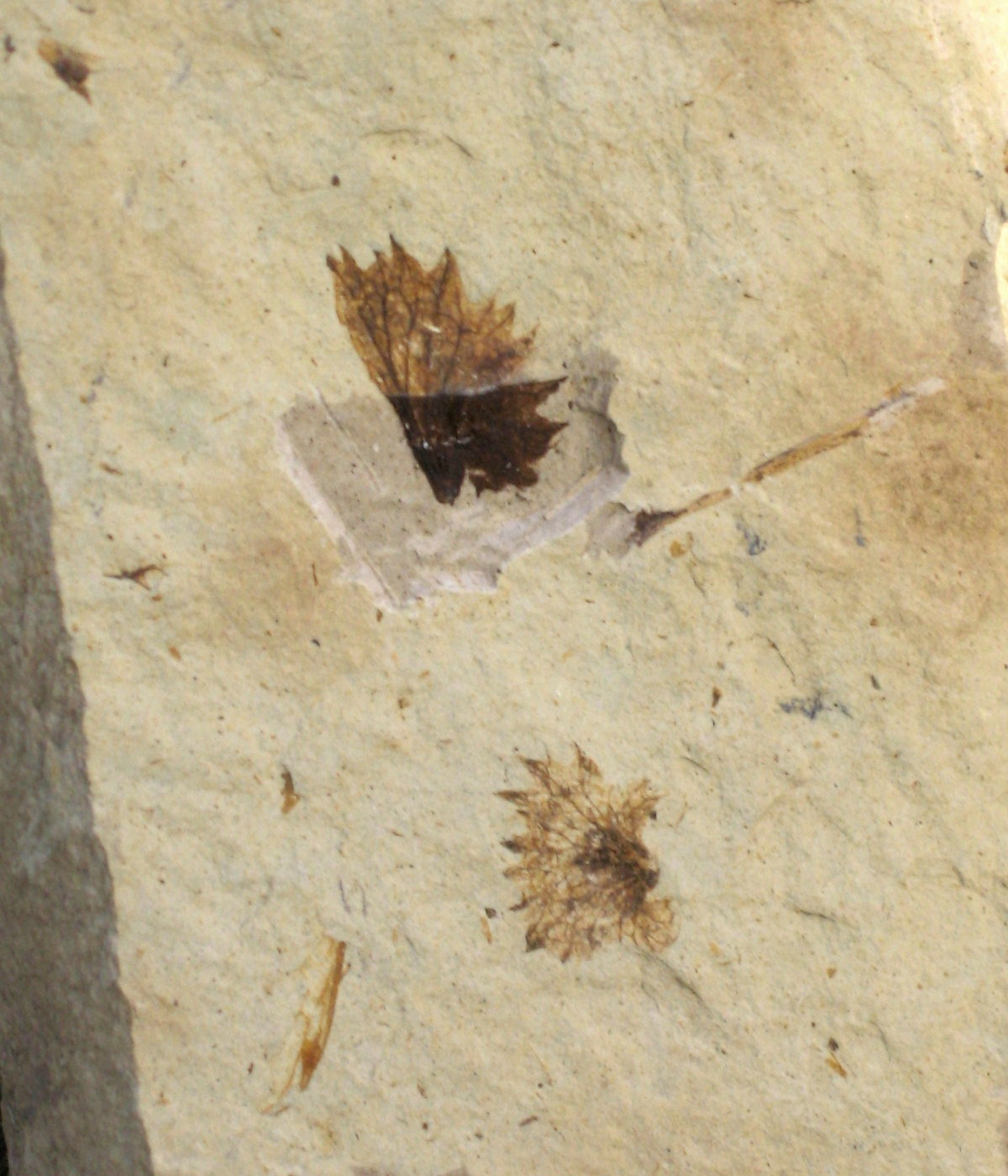
Palaeocarpinus barksdaleae samaras

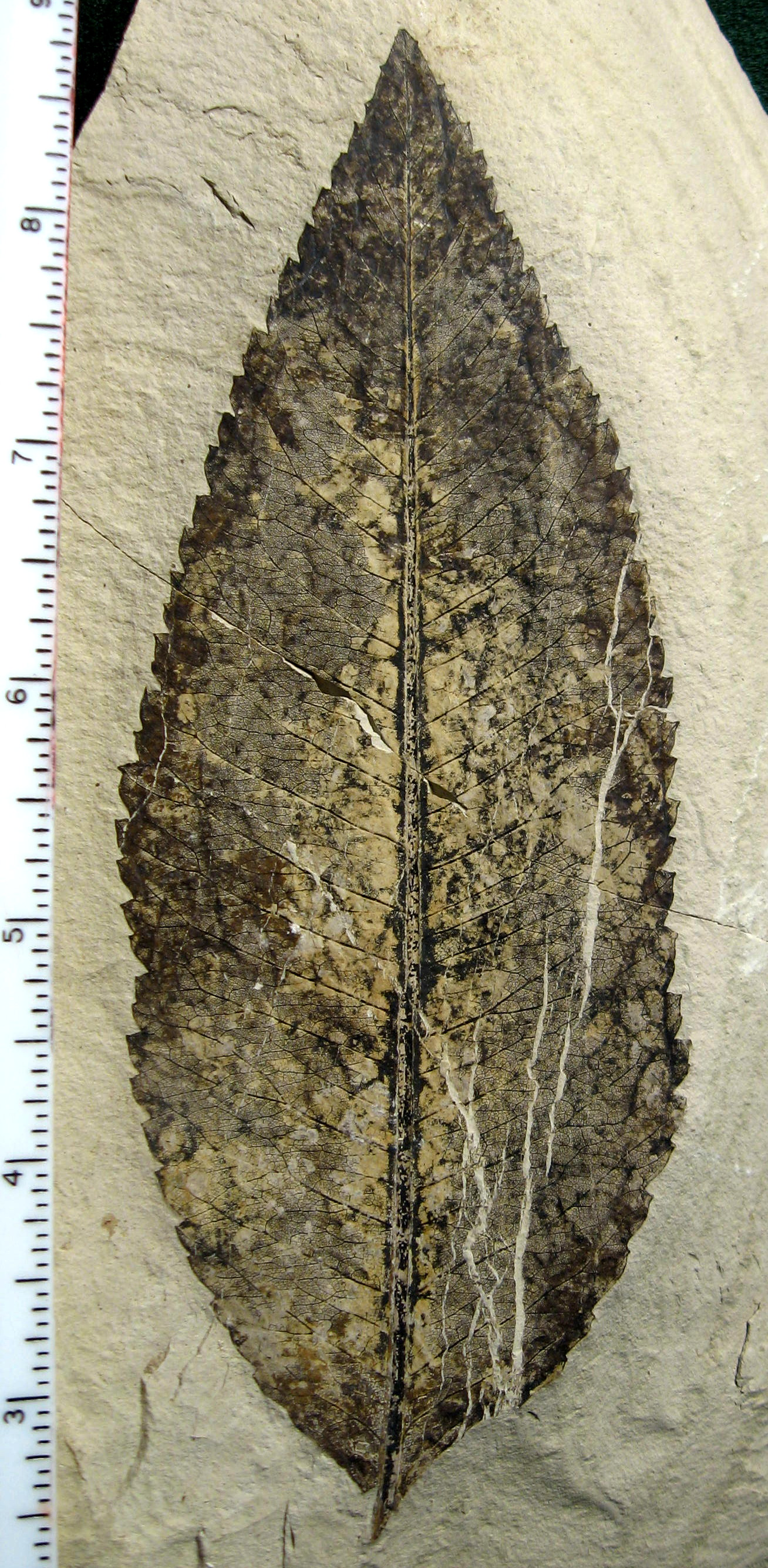
Photinia pagae leaf

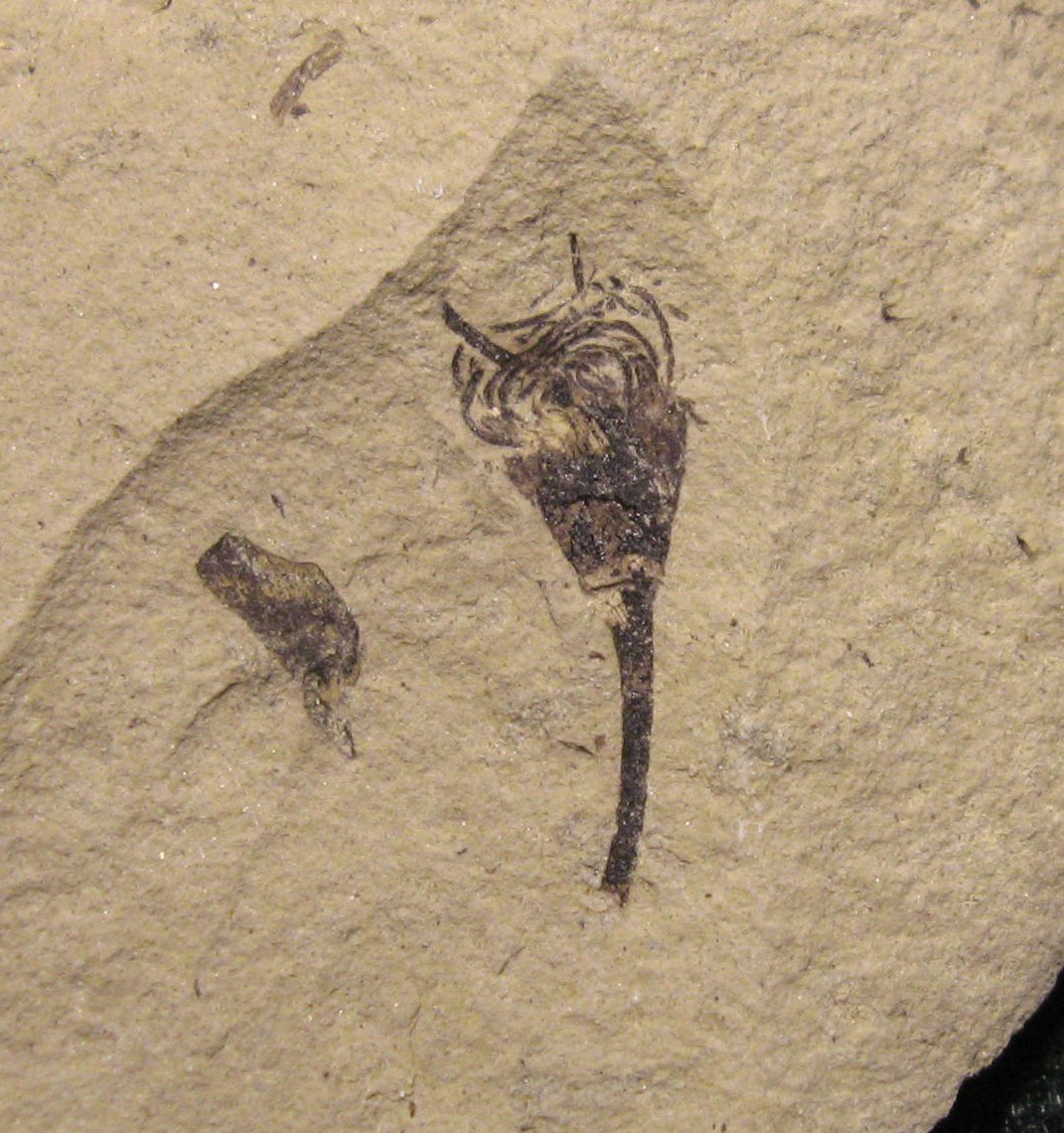
Prunus cathybrownae flower

- †Palaeocarpinus
  - †Palaeocarpinus barksdaleae
  - Undescribed Ypresian Klondike Mountain Formation fossils
- †Palaeophytocrene
  - Undescribed Ypresian Klondike Mountain Formation fossils
- †Paleoallium - type locality for genus
  - †Paleoallium billgenseli - type locality for species
- Paliurus
  - †Paliurus hesperius - Type locality for species (possible syn of †Paliurus favonii or not.)
- †Paraconcavistylon - type locality for genus
  - †Paraconcavistylon wehrii - type locality for species
- Paulownia
  - †Paulownia columbiana - type locality for species
- Pedicularis
  - Undescribed Late Pleistocene Manis Mastodon site subfossil
- †Pentacentron Manchester et al., 2018
  - †Pentacentron sternhartae Manchester et al., 2018 - type locality for species
- Persea
  - †Persea lanceolata - Type locality for species
  - †Persea pseudocarolinensis
- Philadelphus
  - ↑Philadelphus pardeei - type locality for species
  - Undescribed Ypresian Klondike Mountain Formation fossils
- †Phoebe
  - Undescribed Ypresian Klondike Mountain Formation fossils
- †Photinia
  - †Photinia pageae – type locality for species
- Aff. Physocarpus
  - Undescribed Ypresian Klondike Mountain Formation fossils - tentative record
- Phytocrene
  - Cf. †Phytocrene acutissima
- †Plafkeria - type locality for genus
  - †Plafkeria rentonensis - type locality for species
  - Undescribed Ypresian Klondike Mountain Formation fossils
- Plantago
  - Undescribed Late Pleistocene Manis Mastodon site subfossil
- †Platananthus
  - Undescribed Ypresian Klondike Mountain Formation fossils
- Platanus
  - †Platanus americana - type locality for species
  - †Platanus dissecta
- †Platimeliphyllum
  - †Platimeliphyllum durhamensis (syn=Fothergilla durhamensis) – type locality of species
- Platycarya
  - Cf. †Platycarya pseudobrauni
- Platyopuntia
  - Undescribed Late Pleistocene Manis Mastodon site subfossil
- Polygonum
  - †Polygonum amphibium
- Polypodium
  - †'Polypodium' alternatum
- †Polytrichites -Type locality for genus
  - †Polytrichites spokanensis - Type locality for species
- Populus
  - †Populus heteromorpha
  - †Populus lindgreni
  - †Populus washingtonensis
  - †Populus voyana
  - Undescribed Ypresian Klondike Mountain Formation fossils
- Potamogeton
- Potentilla
- Prunus
  - †Prunus barnetti - type locality for species
  - †Prunus cathybrownae
  - †Prunus rodgersae - type locality for species
- †Pseudosalix
  - Undescribed Ypresian 'Klondike Mountain Formation fossils
- Ptelea
  - †Ptelea miocenica - type locality for species
- Pterocarya
  - †Pterocarya mixta - type locality for species
  - †Pterocarya pugetensis – type locality for species
  - Undescribed Ypresian Klondike Mountain Formation fossils
- Pteroceltis
  - Undescribed Ypresian Klondike Mountain Formation fossil
- †Pteroheterochrosperma
  - †Pteroheterochrosperma horseflyensis
- †Pteronepelys
  - †Pteronepelys wehrii
- †Pugetia - type locality for genus
  - †Pugetia longifolia – type locality for species
- Pyracantha
  - Undescribed Ypresian Klondike Mountain Formation fossils - tentative record
- Cf. Pyrus
  - Undescribed Ypresian Klondike Mountain Formation fossils - tentative record

==== Plants Q ====
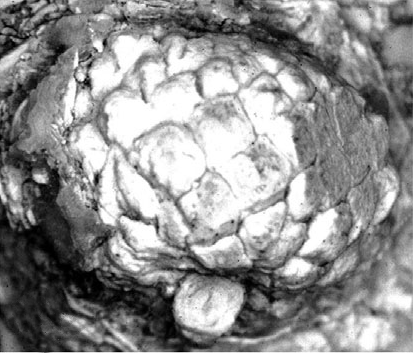
†Quercus hiholensis acorn in matrix

- Quercus
  - †Quercus axelrodi – type locality for species
  - †Quercus bretzi
  - †Quercus cognatus
  - †Quercus dayana
  - †Quercus hiholensis – type locality for species
  - †Quercus leuca (syn Quercus sahnii)- type locality for species
  - †Quercus mccanni – type locality for species
  - †Quercus payettensis
  - †Quercus pseudolyrata
  - †Quercus simulata
  - Undescribed Ypresian Klondike Mountain Formation fossil
  - Undescribed Miocene Latah Formation cupule fossils

==== Plants R ====
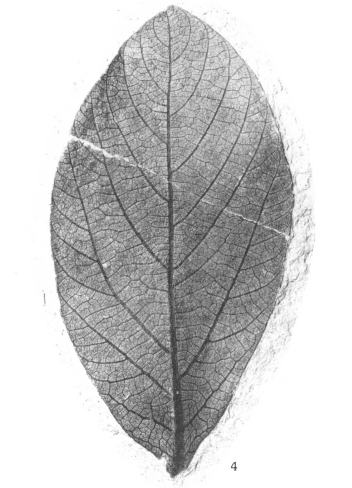
Eocene Republica hickeyi leaf found in Republic Washington

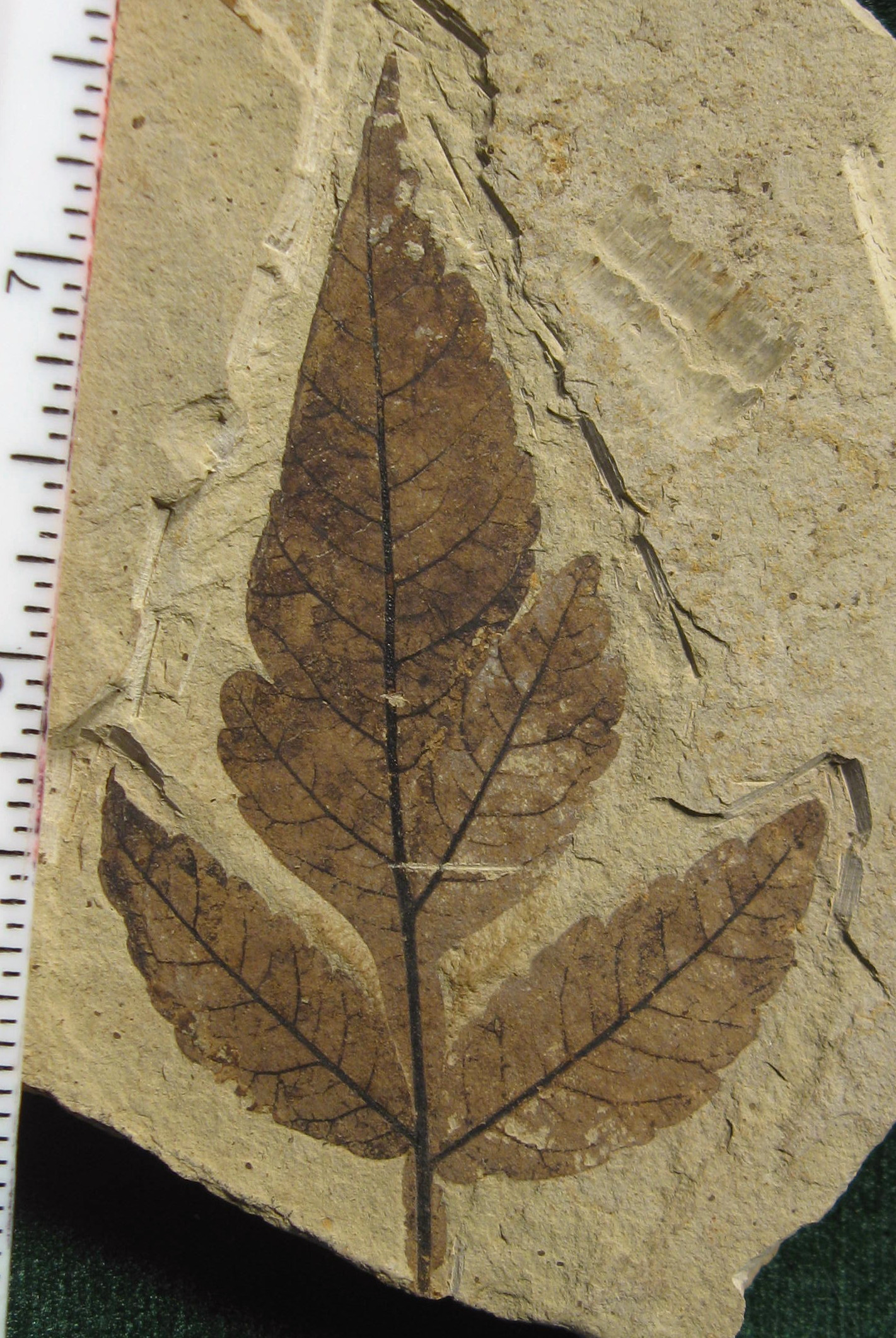
Fossilized compound leaf from an Eocene sumac Rhus hybrid

- Ranunculus
- †Remberella- Type locality for genus
  - †Remberella microcalyx - Type locality for species
- †Republica (plant) – type locality for genus
  - †Republica hickeyi - type locality for species
  - †Republica kummerensis (syn=Dicotylophyllum kummerensis)- type locality for species
  - †Republica litseafolia
- †Rhamnites
  - †Rhamnites cashmanensis - type locality for species
  - †Rhamnites franklinensis - type locality for species
- Rhododendron
  - †Rhododendron knowltoni - type locality for species
  - Undescribed Ypresian Klondike Mountain Formation fossils
- Rhus
  - †Rhus boothillensis - type locality for species
  - †Rhus garwellii - type locality for species
  - †Rhus malloryi – type locality for species
  - †Rhus republicensis - type locality for species
  - Cf. †Rhus typhina
- †Rhysocaryoxylon
  - †Rhysocaryoxylon fryxellii - type locality for species
  - †Rhysocaryoxylon tertiarum - type locality for species
- Ribes
  - Undescribed Ypresian Klondike Mountain Formation fossils
- Richteroxylon - type locality for genus
  - ↑Richteroxylon micropunctatum - type locality for species
- Robinia
  - †Robinia zirkelii
- Cf. Rinorea
- Rosa
- Rubus
  - Undescribed Ypresian Klondike Mountain Formation fossils
- Rumohra
  - †Rumohra bartonae - type locality for species

==== Plants S ====
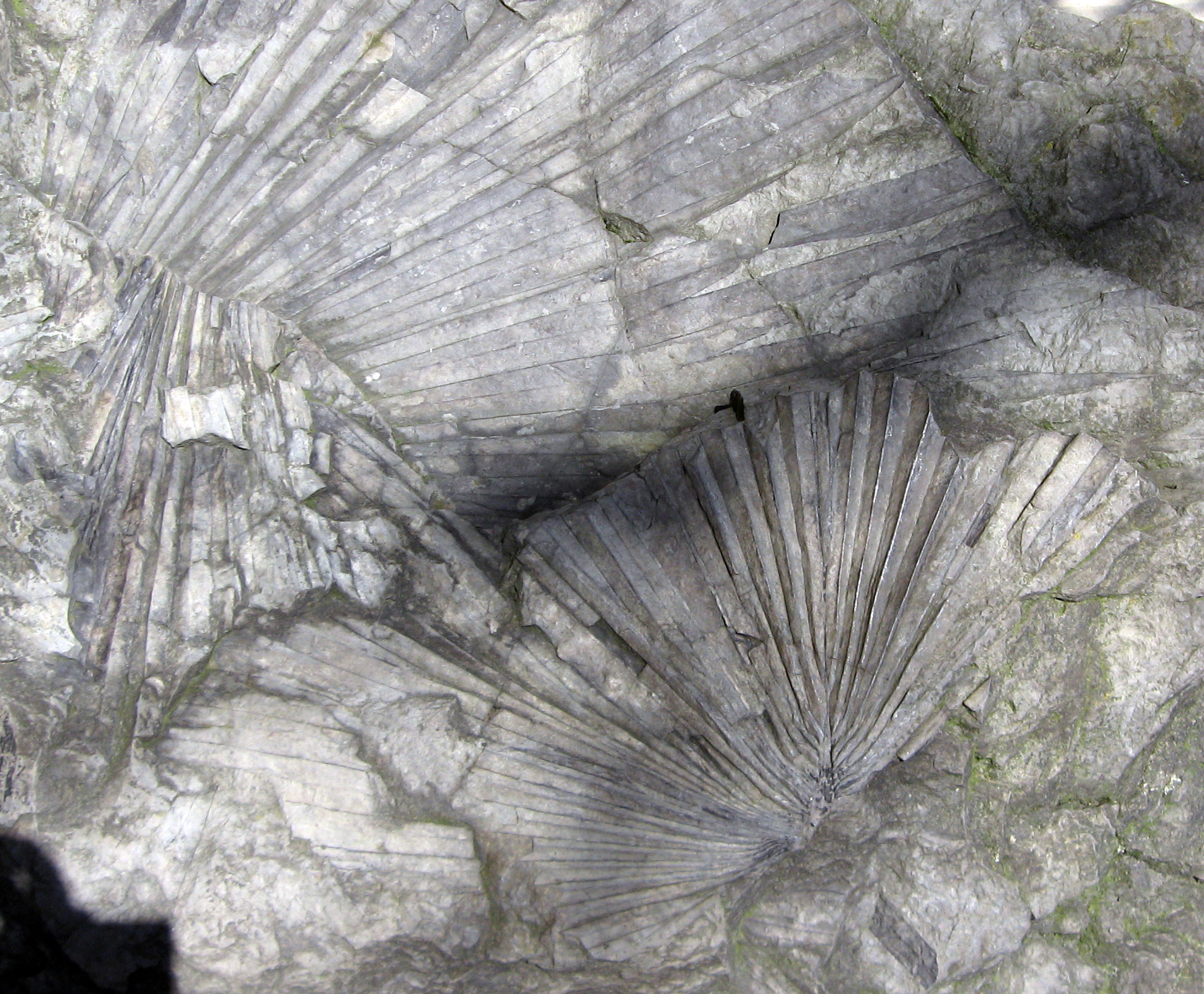
- Fossilized fronds from Sabalites campbelli
  †Sabalites
  - †Sabalites campbelli
- Sabia
  - Undescribed Klondike Mountain Formation fossil
- Salix
  - Cf. †Salix heartensis
  - †Salix spokanensis - type locality for species
  - Undescribed Ypresian Klondike Mountain Formation fossil
- Cf. Sapindus
  - Undescribed Middle Miocene Vantage fossils(s)
- Sarcobatus
- Sassafras
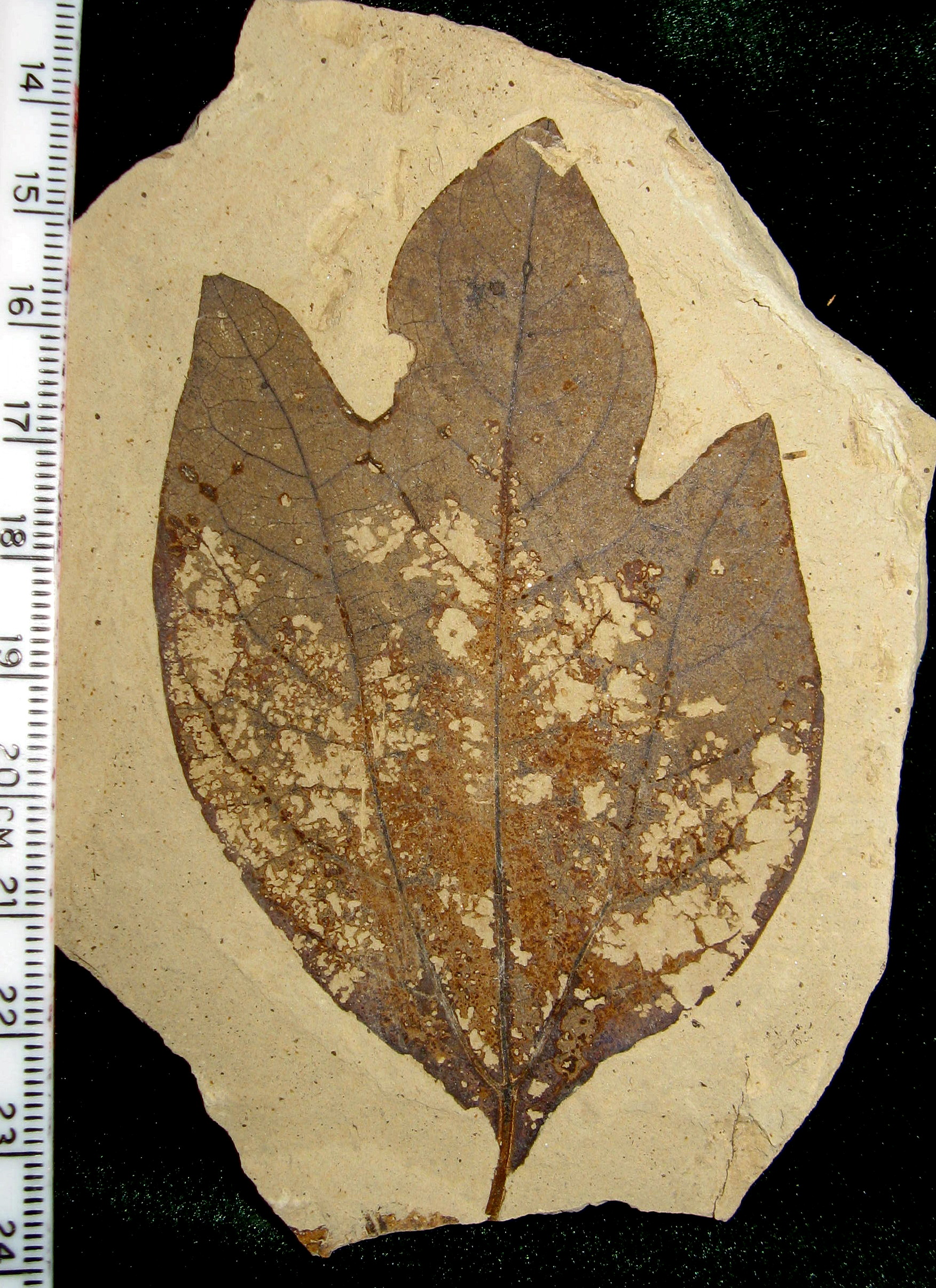
  - Fossilized leaf of the Eocene sassafras Sassafras hesperia
    †Sassafras hesperia - type locality for species
- †Schoepfia
  - †Schoepfia republicensis - type locality for species
- Scirpus
  - Undescribed Late Pleistocene Manis Mastodon site subfossil
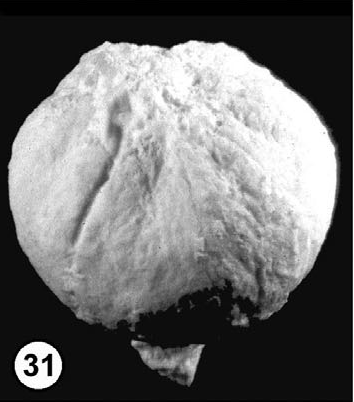
- Miocene Shirleya grahamae fruit
  †Shirleya
  - †Shirleya grahamae
- Sloanea
  - Undescribed Klondike Mountain Formation fossil
- Smilax
  - †Smilax magna
  - Undescribed Klondike Mountain Formation fossil
- Sophora
  - †Sophora spokanensis - type locality for species
- Aff. Sorbus
  - Undescribed Klondike Mountain Formation fossil
- Sparganium
- Spiraea
  - Undescribed Klondike Mountain Formation fossil

==== Plants T ====
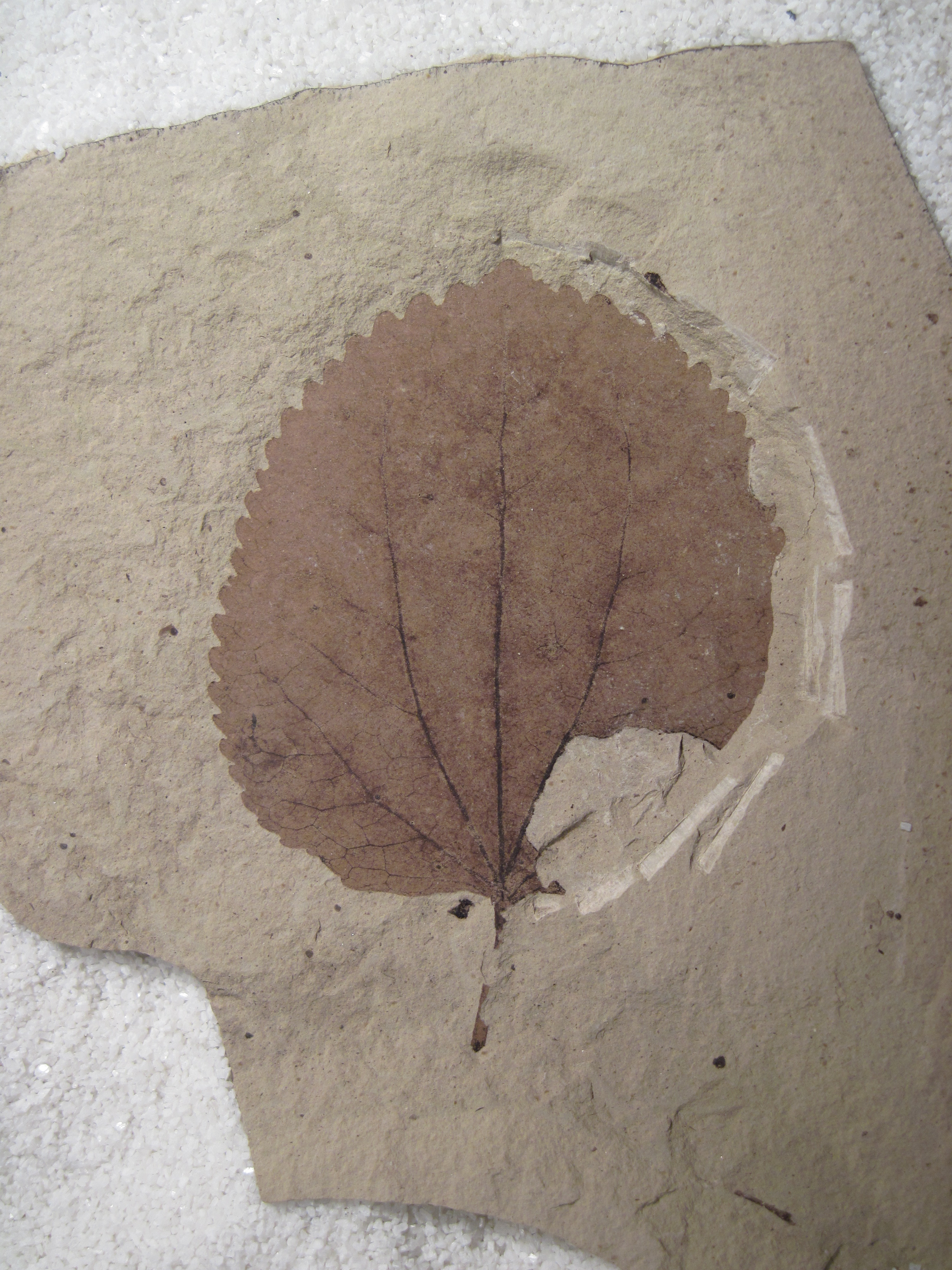
Tetracentron hopkinsii, Klondike Mountain Formation Republic

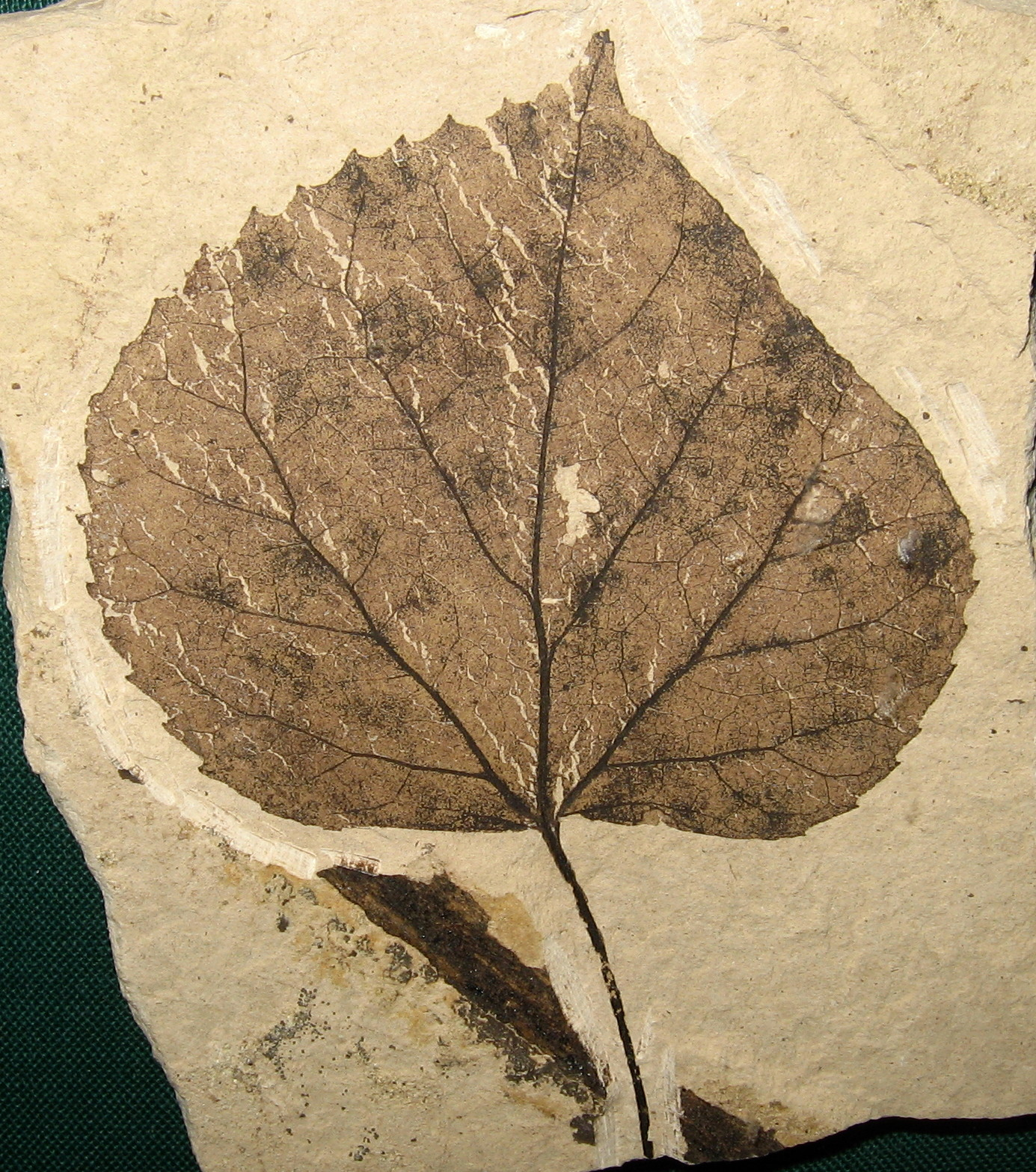
Tilia johnsoni, Klondike Mountain Formation Republic

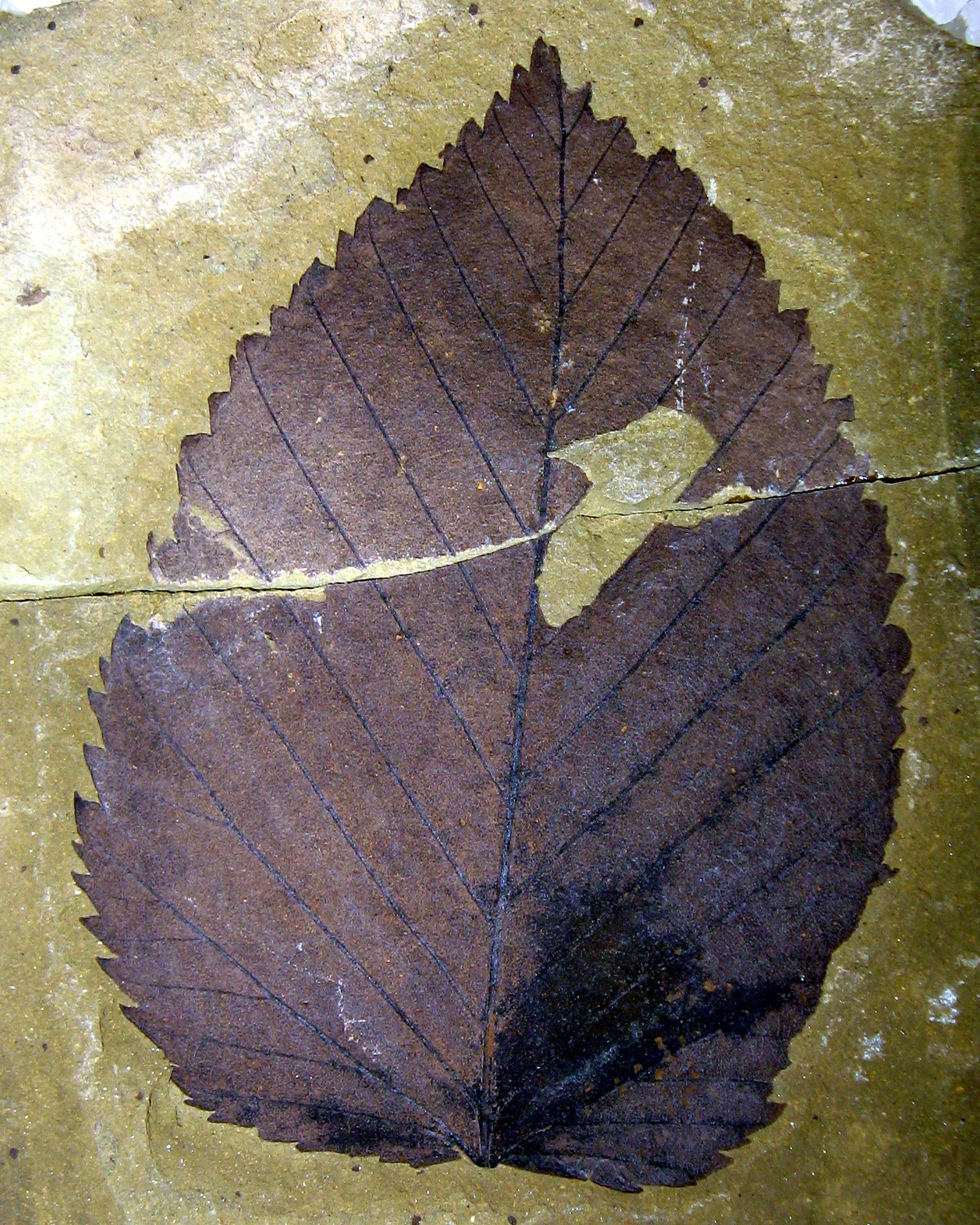
Tsukada davidiifolia, Klondike Mountain Formation Republic

- †Ternstroemites
  - †Ternstroemites ravenensis – type locality for species
  - Undescribed Ypresian Klondike Mountain Formation fossil "Species A"
  - Undescribed Ypresian Klondike Mountain Formation fossil "Species B"
- Tetracentron
  - †Tetracentron hopkinsii Pigg et al., 2007
- †Tetrapleuroxylon
  - †Tetrapleuroxylon vantagiensis - type locality for species
- †Thalictrum
  - Undescribed Late Pleistocene Manis Mastodon site subfossil
- Tilia
  - †Tilia johnsoni – type locality for species
- Trochodendron
  - †Trochodendron nastae
- Tsuga
  - Tsuga heterophylla - subfossil
  - †Tsuga latahensis – type locality for species
  - Tsuga mertensiana - subfossil
  - Undescribed Ypresian Klondike Mountain Formation fossil
- †Tsukada – type locality for genus
  - †Tsukada davidiifolia – type locality for species
- Typha
  - Typha latifolia
  - Undescribed Ypresian Klondike Mountain Formation fossil

==== Plants U ====
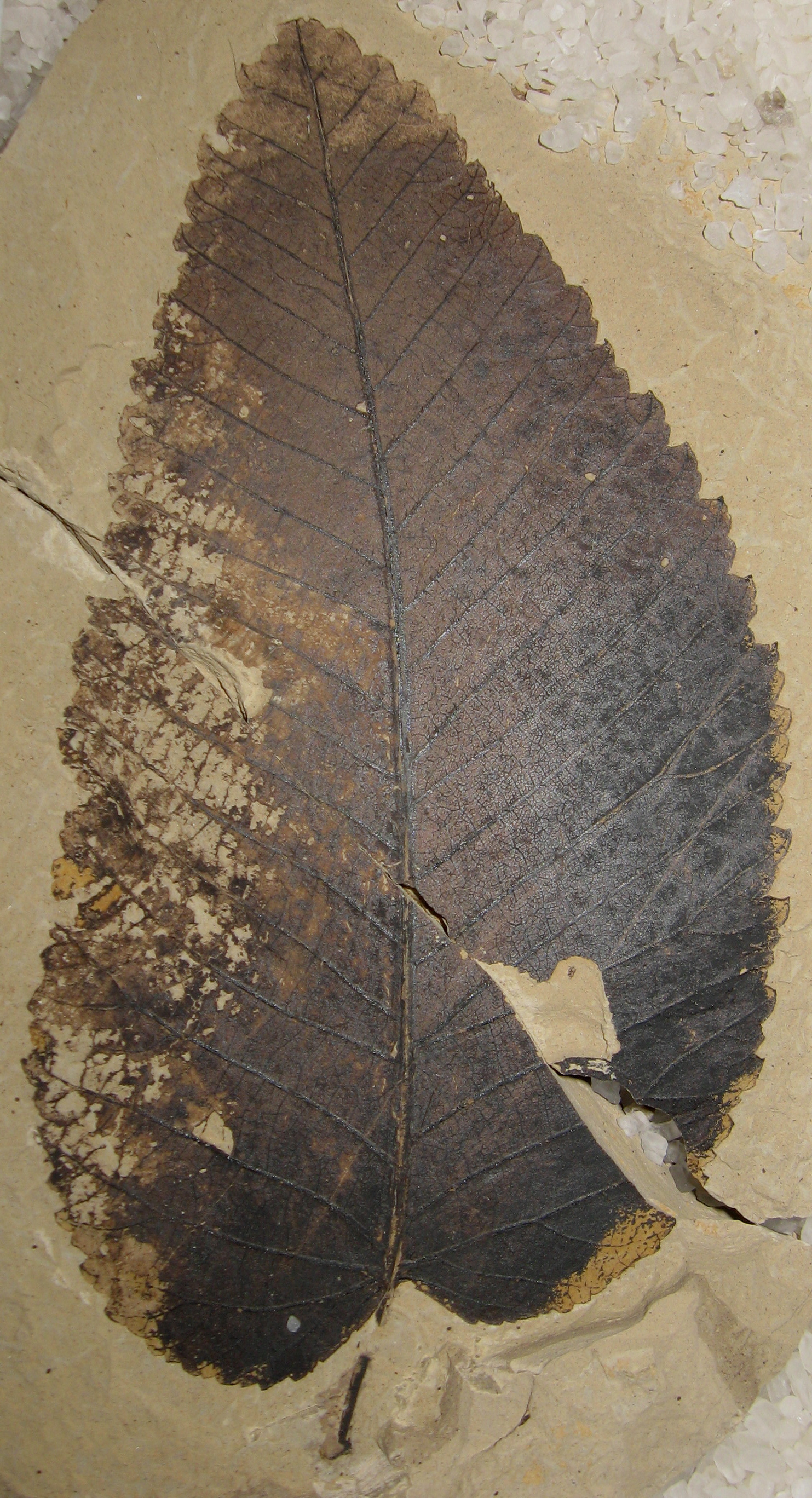
Ulmus chuchuanus, Ypresian Klondike Mountain Formation

- Ulmus
  - †Ulmus baileyana - type locality for species
  - †Ulmus chuchuanus
  - †Ulmus miocenica - type locality for species
  - †Ulmus okanaganensis
  - †Ulmus oregoniana
  - †Ulmus pacifica - type locality for species
  - †Ulmus paucidentata
  - †Ulmus speciosa
- Utricularia
  - Undescribed Late Pleistocene Manis Mastodon site subfossil

==== Plants V ====
- Viburnum
  - †Viburnum pugetensis – type locality for species
- †Vinea - type locality for genus
  - †Vinea pugetensis – type locality of species
- Vitis
  - Undescribed Eocene Puget Group fossil
  - Undescribed Ypresian Klondike Mountain Formation fossil

==== Plants W ====
- †Wessiea
  - †Wessiea yakimaensis
- Woodwardia
  - †Woodwardia aurora - type locality for species
  - †Woodwardia clarus - type locality for species
  - Woodwardia virginica

==== Plants Z ====
- Zannichellia
  - Zannichellia palustris
- Zelkova
  - Undescribed Eocene Puget Group fossil
- †Zingiberopsis
  - Cf. †Zingiberopsis isonervosa
- †Zizyphoides
  - Undescribed Ypresian Klondike Mountain Formation fossils

== Poriferans ==
- Aphrocallistes
  - Cf. †Aphrocallistes polytretos
- Eurete
  - †Eurete? goederti
- Farrea
  - Tentatively reported undescribed Oligocene Lincoln Creek Formation fossil
- Hexactinella
  - †Hexactinella conica – type locality for species
  - †Hexactinella tubula – type locality for species
- Hyperbaena
  - †Hyperbaena dilleri

== Annelids ==
- †Helminthopsis
  - Cf. †Helminthopsis abeli
- Cf. Protula
  - undescribed middle Eocene Puget Group Tukwila Formation fossil(s)
- †Rotularia
  - †Rotularia tejonense
- Osedax
  - undescribed Rupelian Makah Formation fossil(s)
  - undescribed Rupelian-Chattian Pysht Formation fossil(s)
  - undescribed Chattian Lincoln Creek Formation fossil(s)
- †Skolithos
  - Indeterminate Chuckanut Formation Skolithos type burrows

== Nematoids ==
- †Mermia
  - Cf. †Mermia carickensis

== Cnidarians ==
=== Cnidarians A-C ===
- Astrangia
  - †Astrangia clarki – type locality for species
- Astreopora
  - †Astreopora duwamishensis – type locality for species
  - †Astreopora sanjuanensis – type locality for species
- Balanophyllia
  - †Balanophyllia blakelyensis
  - †Balanophyllia cowlitzensis – type locality for species
  - †Balanophyllia fulleri – type locality for species
  - †Balanophyllia teglandae – type locality for species
  - †Balanophyllia variabilis
  - †Balanophyllia washingtonensis – type locality for species
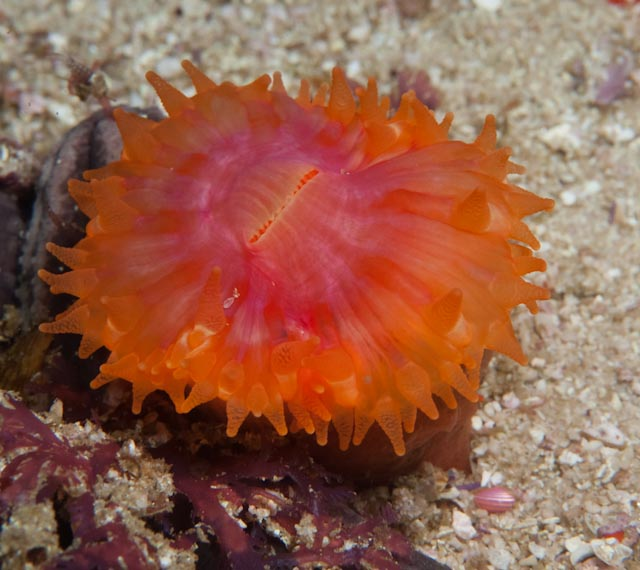
- A living Caryophyllia solitary coral
  Caryophyllia
  - †Caryophyllia blakeleyensis – type locality for species
  - †Caryophyllia woodmanensis – type locality for species
  - †Caryophyllia wynoocheensis – type locality for species
- Coenocyathus
  - †Coenocyathus hannibali – type locality for species
- Colpophyllia
  - †Colpophyllia reagani – type locality for species

=== Cnidarians D-I ===
- Deltocyathus
  - †Deltocyathus insperatus – type locality for species
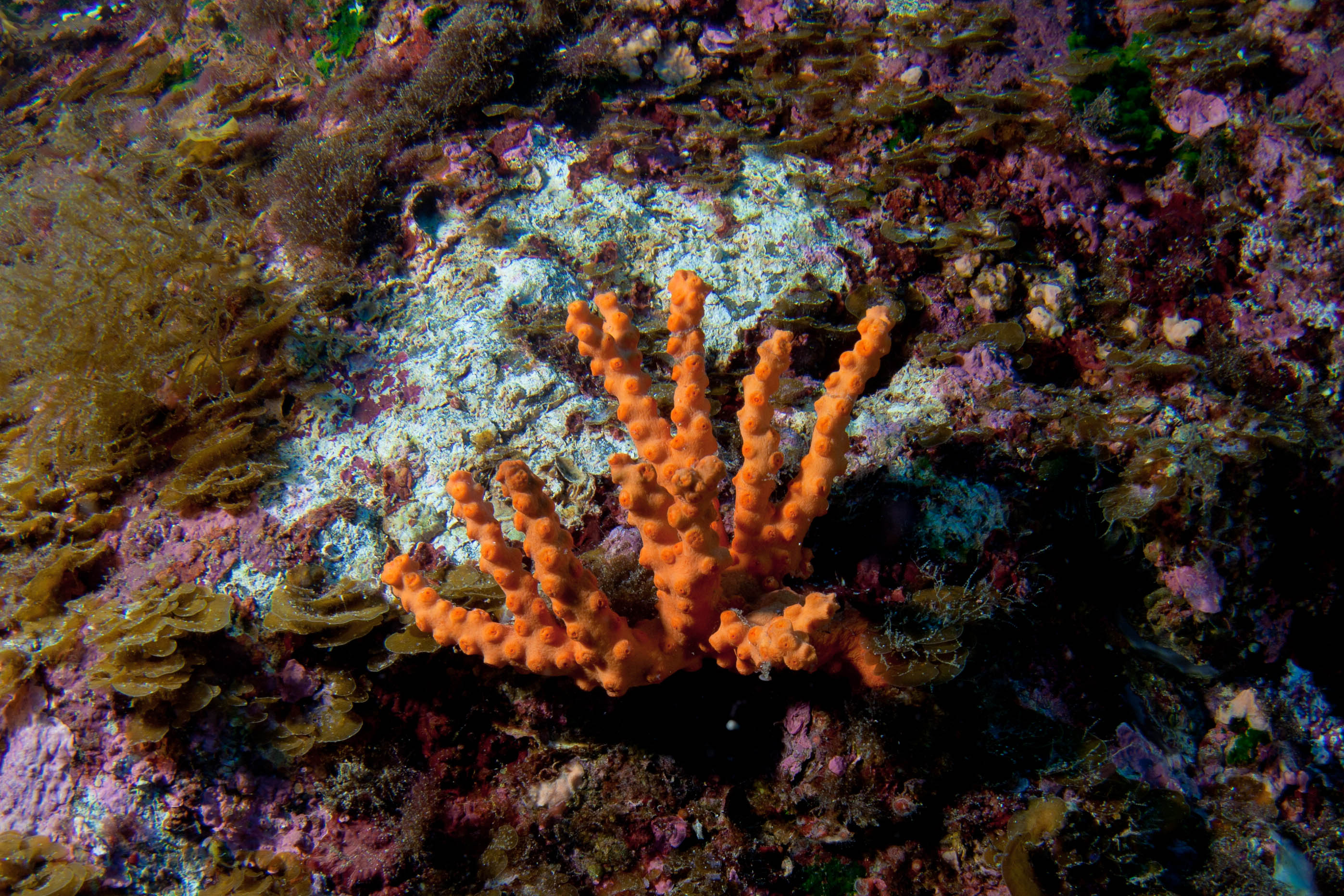
- A living Dendrophyllia cup coral
  Dendrophyllia
  - †Dendrophyllia cowlitzensis – type locality for species
  - †Dendrophyllia hannibali – type locality for species
  - †Dendrophyllia tejonensis
- †Dimorphastrea
  - †Dimorphastrea vaughani – type locality for species
- †Discotrochus
  - Undescribed Eocene Puget Group Tukwila Formation fossil(s)
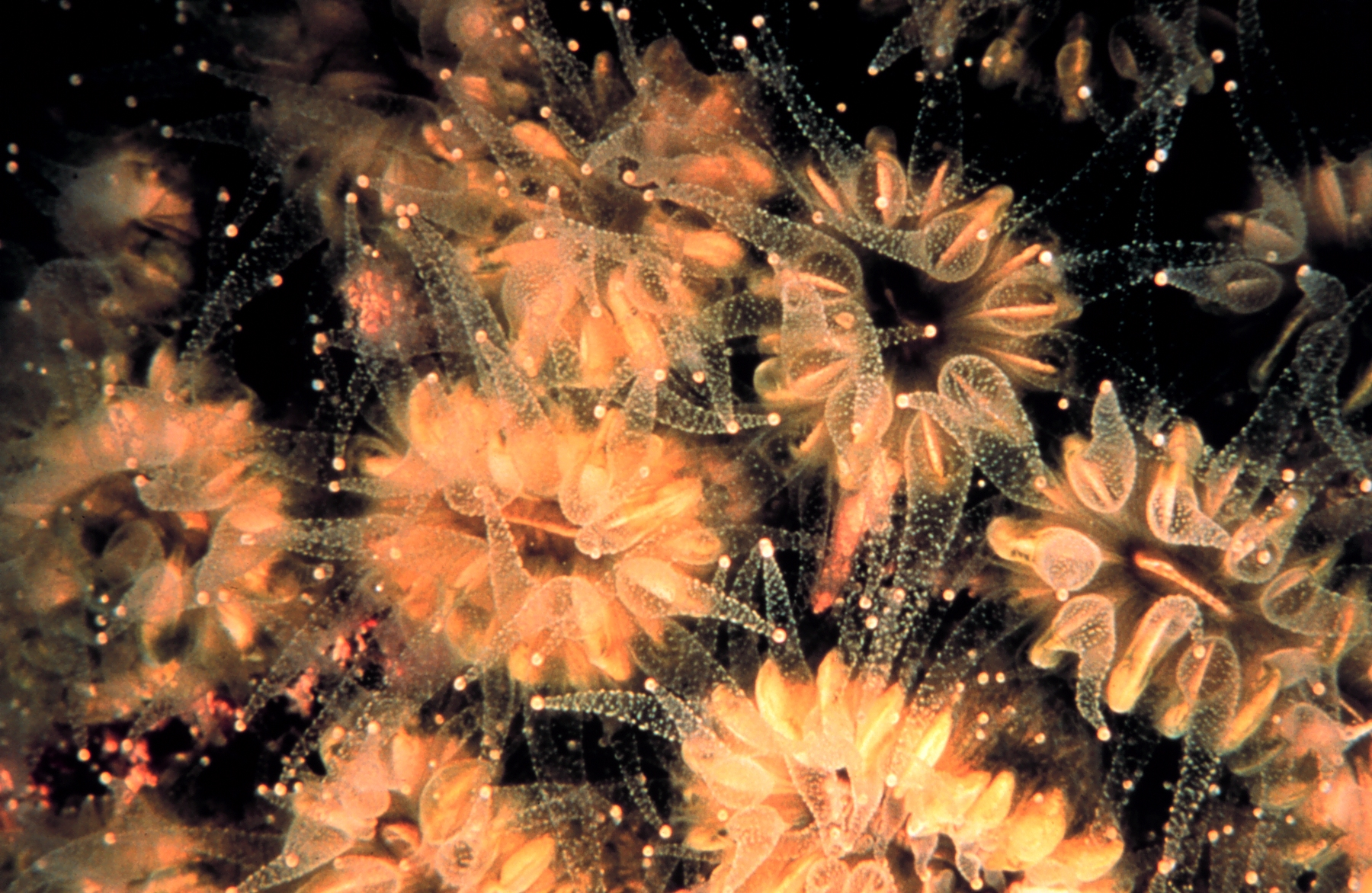
- A living Eusmilia stony coral
  Eusmilia
  - †Eusmilia bainbridgensis – type locality for species
- Flabellum
  - †Flabellum californicum
  - †Flabellum clarki
  - †Flabellum hertleini – type locality for species
- "Graphularia"
  - Aff. Graphularia sasai
  - Indeterminate Late Eocene to Oligocene Pysht & Lincoln Creek Formation fossils
- Isidella
  - Indeterminate late Oligocene Pysht Formation fossils

=== Cnidarians L-R ===
- Lepidisis
  - Indeterminate late Oligocene Pysht Formation fossils
- Leptastrea
  - †Leptastrea hertleini
- Madracis
  - †Madracis crescentensis – type locality for species
  - †Madracis stewarti – type locality for species
- Montipora
  - †Montipora schencki – type locality for species
- Paracyathus
- Petrophyllia
  - †Petrophyllia clarki
  - †Petrophyllia weaveri – type locality for species
- Radicipes?
  - Indeterminate late Oligocene Lincoln Creek Formation fossils

=== Cnidarians S-Z ===
- Sclerhelia ? – tentative report
- Siderastrea
  - Cf. †Siderastrea vancouverensis
  - †Siderastrea washingtonensis – type locality for species
- Stephanocyathus
  - †Stephanocyathus holcombensis – type locality for species
- Stylaster
  - †Stylaster milleri – type locality for species
- Trochocyathus
  - †Trochocyathus crooki
  - †Trochocyathus nomlandi
  - †Trochocyathus townsendensis – type locality for species
- Tubastraea
  - †Tubastraea nomlandi – type locality for species
- Turbinolia
  - †Turbinolia dickersoni
  - †Turbinolia quaylei – type locality for species
  - †Turbinolia weaveri – type locality for species

== Echinoderms ==
- Brisaster
  - undescribed middle Eocene Puget Group Tukwila Formation fossil(s)
- Eupatagus
  - Cf. †Eupatagus carolinensis
- Isocrinus
  - Tentatively reported undescribed early Oligocene Pysht Formation fossil
- Schizaster

== Brachiopods ==
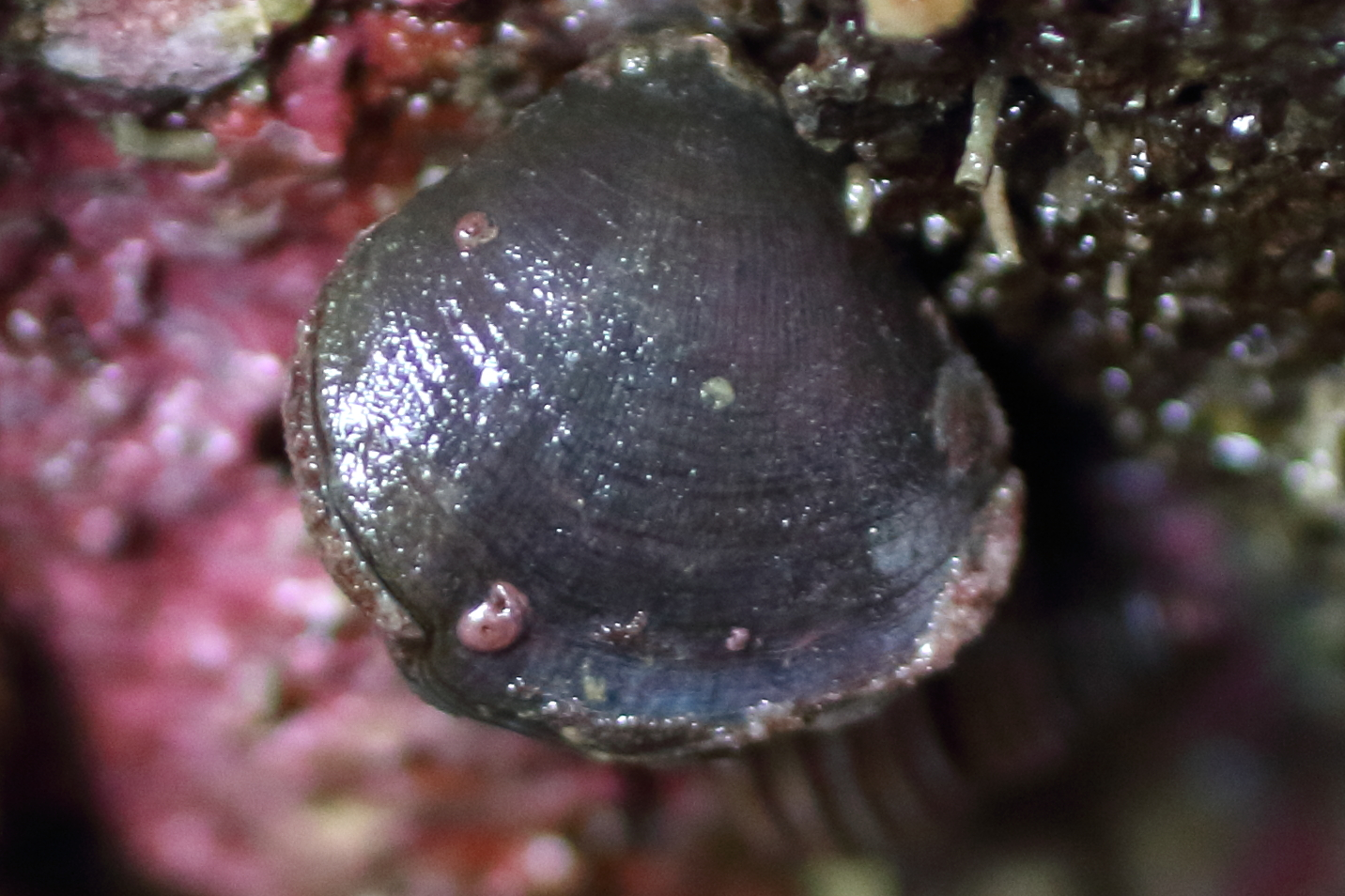
Hemithiris psittacea living specimen

- Craniscus
  - †Craniscus edwilsoni – type locality for species
- Gryphus
  - Undescribed Ypresian Crescent Formation fossil
- Hemithiris
  - †Hemithiris reagani
- Terebratulina
  - †Terebratulina unguicula
  - †Terebratulina washingtonensis (syn=Rhynchonella washingtoniana)
  - †Terebratulina weaveri

== Molluscs ==
=== Molluscs A ===
- Acharax
  - †Acharax dalli (Clark, 1925) (syn = Solemya dalli)
- Acila
  - †Acila conradi
  - †Acila decisa
  - †Acila gettysburgensis
  - †Acila pugetensis
- Acrilla
  - †Acrilla (Ferminoscala) aragoensis
- †Acutostrea
  - †Acutostrea idriaensis
- Aforia
  - †Aforia clallamensis
- Amaea
  - †Amaea olympicensis
  - †Amaea washingtonensis
- Amauropsis
  - †Amauropsis blakeleyensis
- Anadara
  - †Anadara devincta
  - Cf. †Anadara lakei
- †Anamirta
  - Cf. †Anamirta milleri – or unidentified comparable form
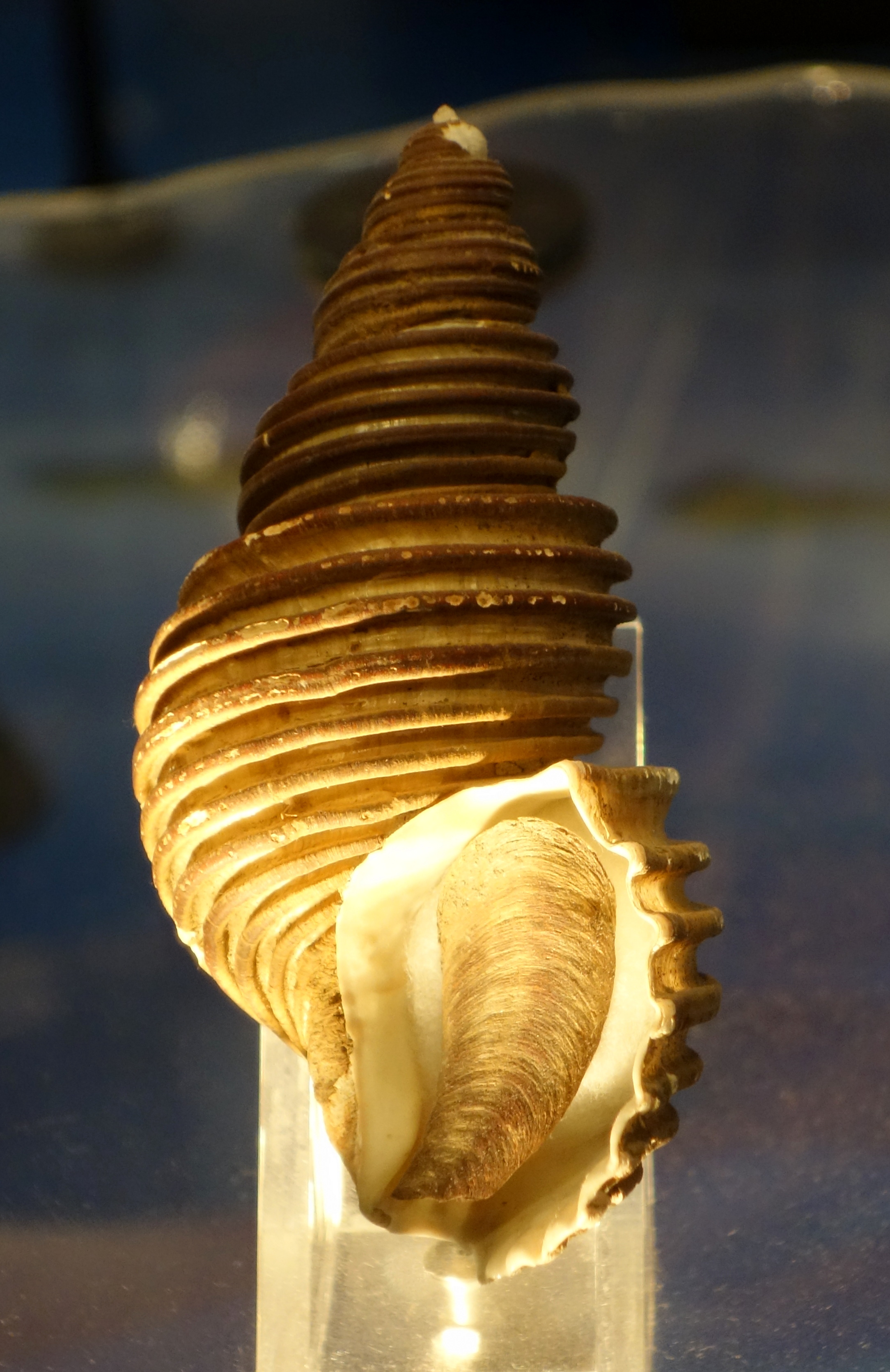
- Fossilized shell of the whelk sea snail Ancistrolepis
  Ancistrolepis
  - †Ancistrolepis rearensis
- †'Anechinocardium
  - †Anechinocardium lorenzanum
  - Cf. †Anechinocardium weaveri
- †Aperiploma
  - †Aperiploma bainbridgensis
- †Archarax
  - †Archarax dalli
- Architectonica
  - Cf. †Architectonica congnata
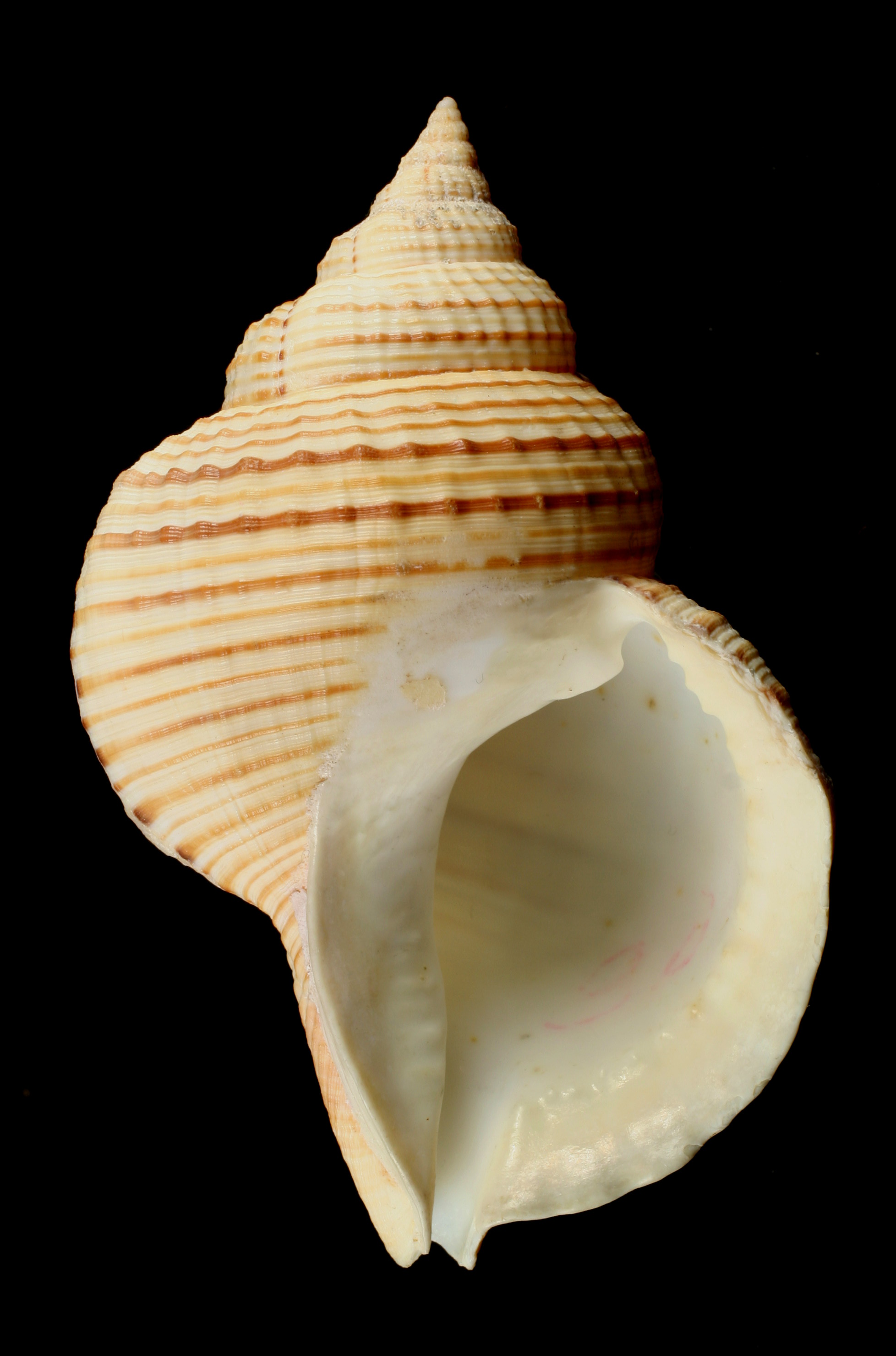
- Shell of an Argobuccinum triton sea snail
  Argobuccinum
  - †Argobuccinum goodspeedi
  - †Argobuccinum mathewsonii
  - †Argobuccinum washingtoniana
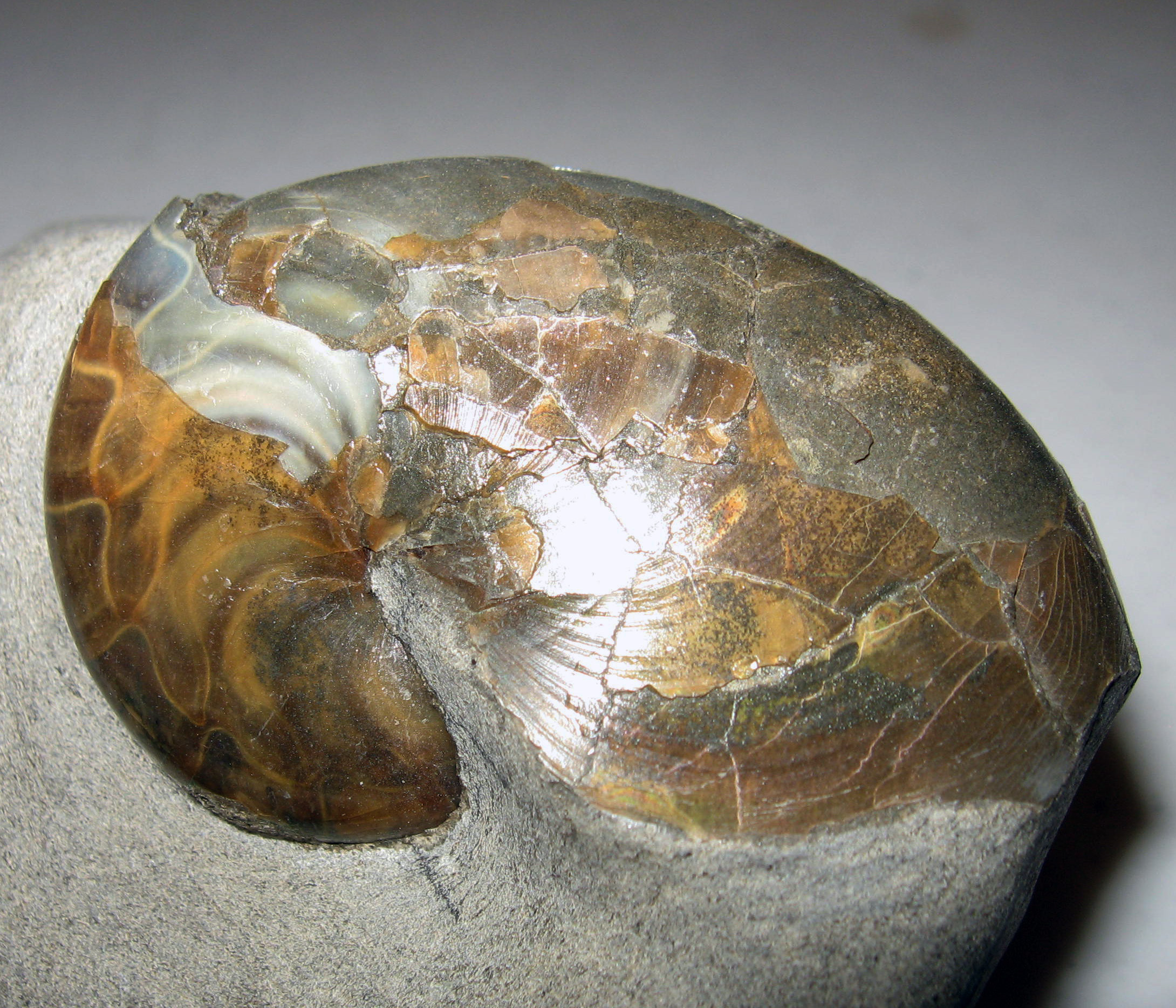
- Aturia angustata Lincoln Creek Formation Oligocene, WA
  †Aturia
  - Cf. †Aturia alabamensis – or unidentified comparable form
  - †Aturia angustata
  - †Aturia grandior – type locality for species

=== Molluscs B ===
- Barbatia
  - †Barbatia landesi
- Bathybembix
  - †Bathybembix columbiana
- Batissa
  - †Batissa dubia
  - †Batissa newberryi
- Bonellitia
  - †Bonellitia paucivaricata
- Brachidontes
  - †Brachidontes (Brachidontes) cowlitzensis (syn=Modiolus cowlitzensis)
  - †Brachidontes dichotomus
- †Bruclarkia
  - †Bruclarkia oregonensis
  - †Bruclarkia thor
  - †Bruclarkia yaquinana
- Buccinum
  - †Buccinum percrassum

=== Molluscs C ===
- Cadulus
  - †Cadulus gabbi
- Calliostoma
  - †Calliostoma mea
- Callithaca
  - †Callithaca tenerrima
- †Calorebama
  - †Calorebama inornata
- Calyptraea
  - †Calyptraea diegoana
  - †Calyptraea washingtonensis
- Cancellaria
  - †Cancellaria birchi
  - Cf. †Cancellaria oregonensis
  - Cf. †Cancellaria siletzensis
  - Cf. †Cancellaria simplex
  - †Cancellaria wynoocheensis
- Cantharus
  - †Cantharus cowlitzensis
- Cardiomya ? – tentative report
- Cerithiopsis
  - †Cerithiopsis vaderensis
  - †Cerithiopsis washingtoniana
- Chama
- Chione
  - †Chione ensifera
  - †Chione securis
- Chlamys
  - †Chlamys hastata
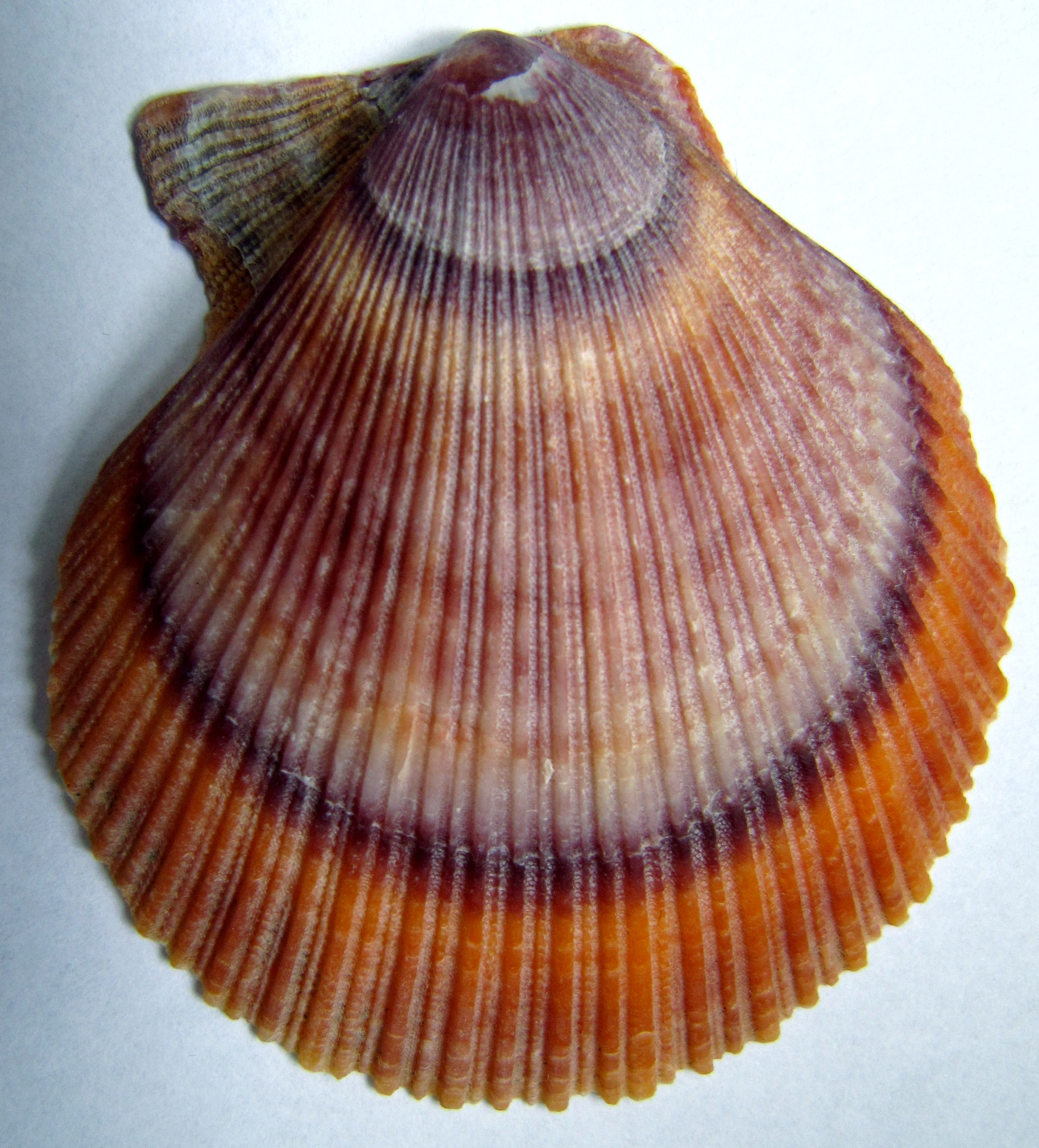
  - A modern shell of Chlamys islandica, or Iceland scallop
    †Chlamys islandica
  - †Chlamys waylandi
- †Chrysodomus
  - †Chrysodomus imperialis
- Cidarina
  - †Cidarina antiquua – type locality for species
- †Cimomia
  - †Cimomia hesperia – type locality for species
- Cirsotrema
  - †Cirsotrema saundersi
- Clavus
  - †Clavus fryei
- Clinocardium
  - †Clinocardium meekianum
  - †Clinocardium nuttallii
- Colus
  - †Colus sekiuensis - type locality for species
- †Colwellia
  - †Colwellia bretzi
- †Conchocele
  - †Conchocele bisecta
- Conus
  - †Conus aegilops
  - †Conus cowlitzensis
  - †Conus vaderensis
  - †Conus weaveri
  - †Conus weltoni
- Corbicula
  - †Corbicula cowlitzensis
  - Cf. †Corbicula willisi
- Corbula
  - †Corbula dickersoni
  - †Corbula parilis
- Costacallista
  - †Costacallista conradiana (syn=Microcallista conradiana)
- †Cowlitzia
  - †Cowlitzia washingtonensis
- Craspedochiton
  - †Craspedochiton eernissei
- Crassatella
  - †Crassatella uvasana
  - †Crassatella wasana
  - †Crassatella washingtoniana (syn=Crassatellites washingtoniana)
- Crenella – tentative report
- Crepidula
  - †Crepidula praerupta
  - †Crepidula princeps
  - †Crepidula rostralis
  - †Crepidula ungana
- †Cristispira
  - †Cristispira pugetensis
- †Cryptochorda
  - †Cryptochorda californica
- †Cryptolucina
  - †Cryptolucina megadyseides
- Cryptomya
  - †Cryptomya californica
- Cryptonatica
  - Cryptonatica affinis
- Cyclammina
- †Cylichnina
  - †Cylichnina tantilla
- Cyclocardia
  - †Cyclocardia hannibali
  - †Cyclocardia subtenta
- Cyclostremella
- Cymatium
  - †Cymatium cowlitzense
  - †Cymatium washingtonianum
- Cypraea
- †Cypraeogemmula
  - †Cypraeogemmula warnerae

=== Molluscs D ===
- Delectopecten
  - Undescribed Oligocene Lincoln Creek Formation fossil
  - undescribed Eocene "Unit B" Cowlitz Formation fossil
- Dentalium
  - †Dentalium porterensis
  - †Dentalium pseudonyma
  - †Dentalium schencki
  - †Dentalium stramineum
- †Dentimitra
  - †Dentimitra cretacea
- Diodora
  - †Diodora stillwaterensis (syn=Fissuridea stillwaterensis)
- Dosinia
  - †Dosinia whitleyi

=== Molluscs E ===
- Echinophoria
  - †Echinophoria dalli
  - †Echinophoria trituberculata (syn=Galeodea trituberculata)
- †Ectinochilus
  - †Ectinochilus (Cowlitzia) canalifer supraplicata (syn=Rimella supraplicata)
  - †Ectinochilus macilentus
  - †Ectinochilus washingtonensis
- Emarginula
  - †Emarginula dotyhillsensis – type locality for species
- †Eopustularia
  - †Eopustularia goedertorum – type locality for species
- Epitonium
  - †Epitonium (Boreoscala) condoni (syn=Arctoscala condoni)
  - †Epitonium berthiaumei
  - †Epitonium clallamense
  - Cf. †Epitonium olympicensis
  - †Epitonium schencki
- †Eratotrivia
  - †Eratotrivia crescentensis
- Erginus
  - †Erginus vaderensis
- Eulima
  - †Eulima clarki
  - †Eulima lewisiana
- Eurytellina
  - †Eurytellina lorenzoensis
- Euspira
  - †Euspira hotsoni
  - †Euspira nuciformis
- †Eutrephoceras
  - †Eutrephoceras eyerdami – type locality for species
- Exilia
  - †Exilia clarki
  - †Exilia dickersoni
  - †Exilia mclellani

=== Molluscs F ===
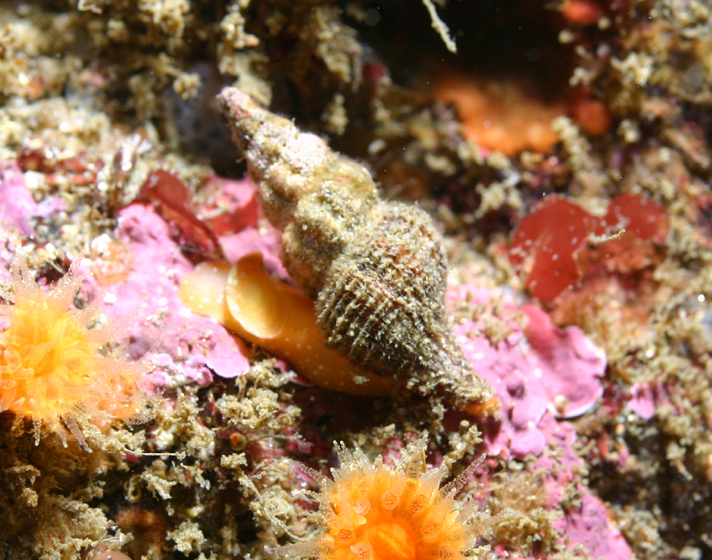
A living Fusinus sea snail

- Falsifusus
  - †Falsifusus marysvillensis
- †Ficopsis
  - †Ficopsis cowlitzensis
  - Cf. †Ficopsis redmondi
- Ficus
  - †Ficus clallamensis
  - †Ficus modesta
  - †Ficus restorationensis
  - †Ficus washingtonensis
- Fulgoraria
  - †Fulgoraria indurata
  - †Fulgoraria weaveri
- Fulgurofusus
  - †Fulgurofusus washingtoniana
- Fusinus
  - †Fusinus dilleri
  - †Fusinus willisi

=== Molluscs G ===
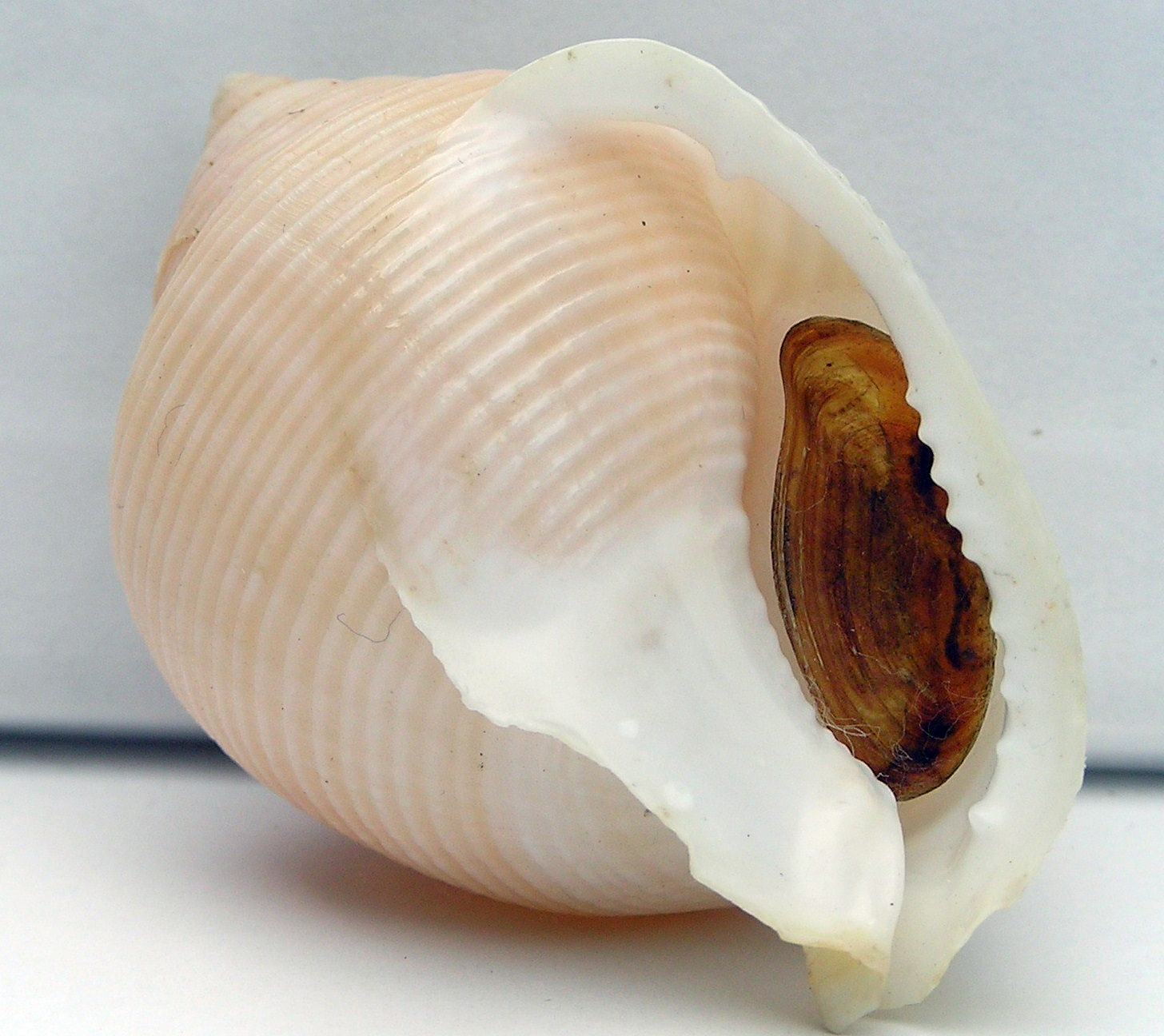
- Shell of a Galeodea helmet snail
  Galeodea
  - †Galeodea apta
  - †Galeodea crescentensis
  - †Galeodea fax
  - †Galeodea petrosa
  - †Galeodea rex
- Gari
  - Cf. †Gari (Gobraeus) hornii
  - †Gari (Psammobia) columbiana - type locality for species
  - †Gari (Psammobia) cowlitzensis - type locality for species
  - †Gari (Psammobia) olequahensis - type locality for species
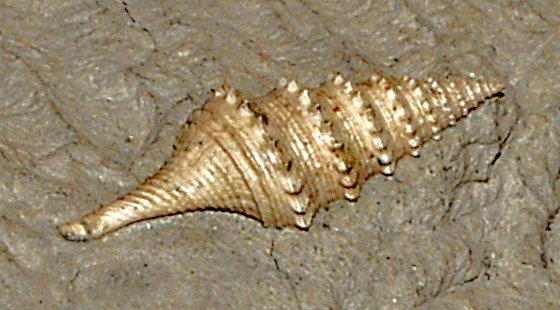
- Fossilized shell of a Gemmula sea snail, or gem turrid
  Gemmula
  - †Gemmula abacta
  - †Gemmula barksdalei
  - †Gemmula borgenae
  - †Gemmula fasteni
  - †Gemmula pluchra
  - †Gemmula pulchra
- Glycymeris
  - †Glycymeris fresnoensis
  - †Glycymeris sagittata
  - †Glycymeris wishkahensis
- Gyrineum
  - †Gyrineum marshalli

=== Molluscs H ===
- Haplocochlias
  - †Haplocochlias montis
- Hiatella
  - Hiatella arctica
- Hipponix
  - †Hipponix amoldi
- Homalopoma
  - †Homalopoma hieroglyphica
  - †Homalopoma umpquaensis
- †Humptulipsia - type locality for genus
  - †Humptulipsia raui - type locality for species

=== Molluscs I ===
- Idas
  - Idas olympicus - type locality of species
- Ischnochiton
  - †Ischnochiton goederti
- Isognomon
  - †Isognomon (Isognomon) clarki

=== Molluscs K ===
- Katherinella
  - †Katherinella angustiformis
  - †Katherinella angustifrons
  - †Katherinella arnoldi
  - †Katherinella augustifrons
- Kellia
  - †Kellia twinensis
- †Kummelonautilus
  - Cf. †Kummelonautilus cookanus

=== Molluscs L ===
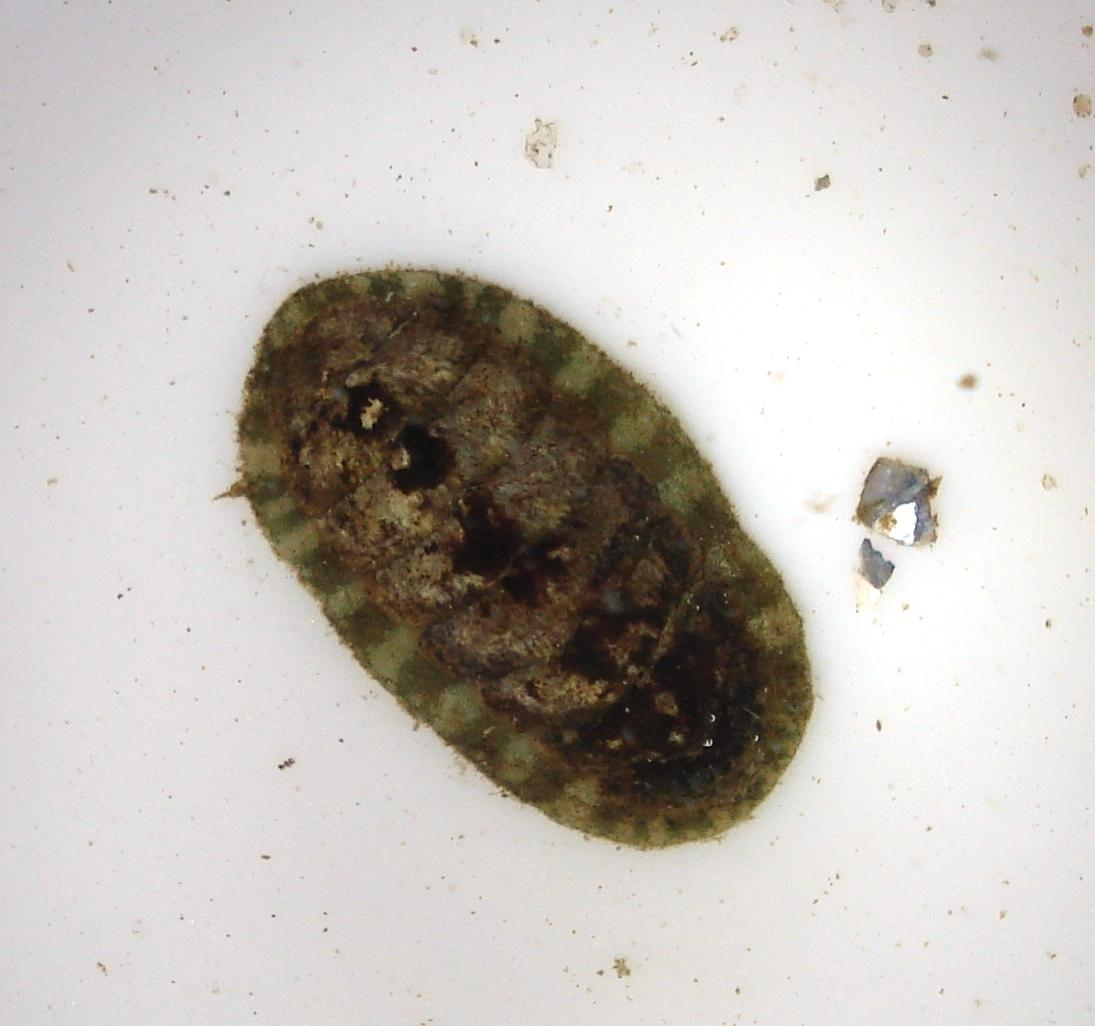
A living Lepidochitona chiton

- Lamelliconcha
  - †Lamelliconcha eocenica
- Laevidentalium
  - undescribed middle Eocene Puget Group Tukwila Formation fossil(s)
- Lepidochitona
  - †Lepidochitona lioplax
  - †Lepidochitona squiresi
  - †Lepidochitona washingtonensis
- Lepidopleurus
  - †Lepidopleurus propecajetanus
- Leptochiton
  - †Leptochiton alveolus
- †Leptogyra
  - ††Leptogyra squiresi – type locality for species
- Leukoma
  - Leukoma staminea
- Liotia
  - †Liotia washingtoniana – type locality for species
- †Litorhadia
  - †Litorhadia washingtonensis (syn=Leda washingtonensis, Nuculana washingtonensis)
- Lucinoma
  - †Lucinoma acutilineata
  - †Lucinoma annulatum
  - Cf. †Lucinoma columbiana
  - †Lucinoma hannibali
- Lyria
  - †Lyria andersoni

=== Molluscs M ===
- Macoma
  - †Macoma albaria
  - †Macoma astori
  - †Macoma calcarea
  - †Macoma inquinata
  - Macoma nasuta
  - Cf. †Macoma secta
  - †Macoma snohomishensis
  - †Macoma sookensis
  - †Macoma twinensis
- Macrocallista
  - †Macrocallista cathcartensis
- Mactromeris
  - †Mactromeris albaria
  - †Mactromeris pittsburgensis
- Marcia
  - †Marcia oregonensis
- Margarites
  - †Margarites (Margarites) chappelli
  - †Margarites (Margarites) serceus
  - †Margarites (Pupillaria) columbiana
- Marginella
  - †Marginella shepardae
- †Megistostoma
  - †Megistostoma gabbiana
- Mitra
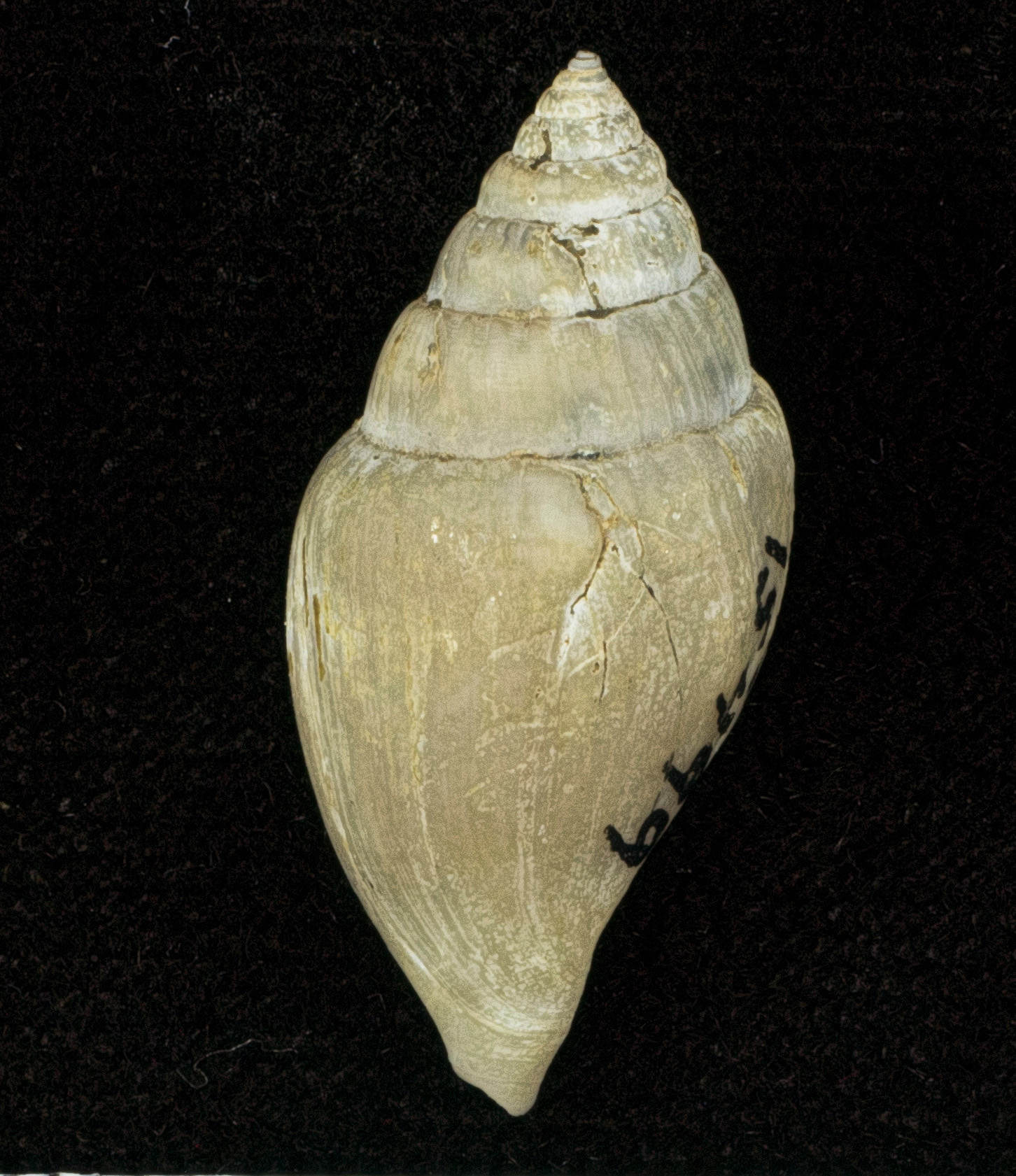
  - Fossilized shell found in Vader; the hypotype specimen of the Eocene miter snail Mitra washingtoniana
    †Mitra washingtoniana
- Modiolus
  - Cf. †Modiolus restorationensis
  - †Modiolus willapaensis
- †Molopophorus
  - Cf. †Molopophorus newcombei
- Murex
  - †Murex cowlitzensis
  - †Murex sopenahensis
- †Mya
  - †Mya arenaria
  - †Mya truncata
- Mytilus
  - †Mytilus dichotomus
  - Mytilus edulis
  - †Mytilus sammamishensis
  - †Mytilus snohomishensis
  - †Mytilus stillaguamishensis
  - Cf. †Mytilus tichanovitchi

=== Molluscs N ===
- Nassa
  - †Nassa eocenica (syn=Latirus eocenica)
- Nassarius
  - †Nassarius mednica
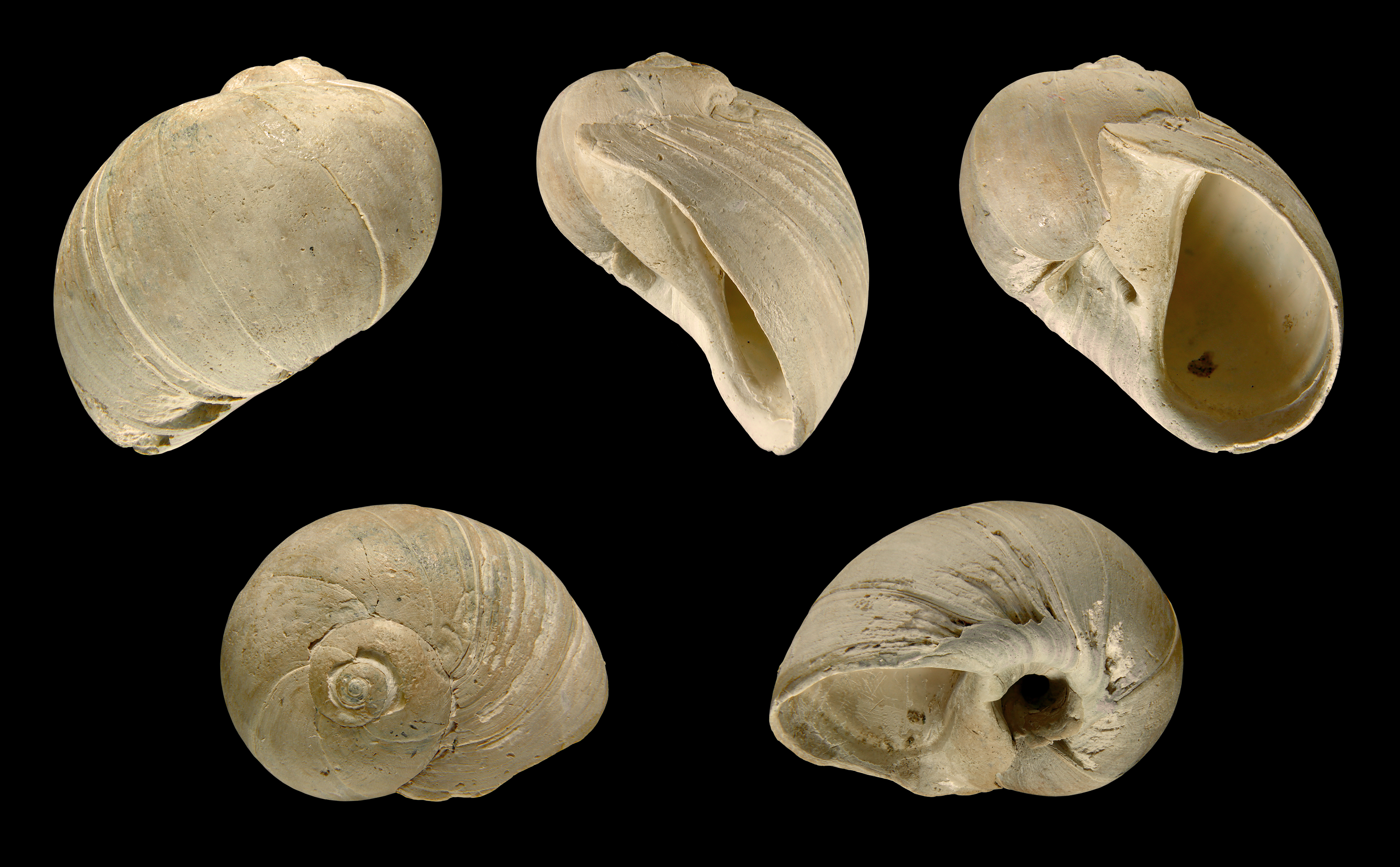
- Multiple views of a fossilized shell belonging to a Natica moon snail
  Natica
  - Cf. †Natica clarki
  - †Natica oligocenica
  - †Natica teglandae
  - †Natica vokesi
  - †Natica weaveri
- †Nayadina
  - †Nayadina batequensis
- †Nekewis
  - †Nekewis washingtoniana
- Nemocardium
  - †Nemocardium lincolnensis
  - †Nemocardium linteum
- Neptunea
  - †Neptunea landesi
  - †Neptunea lincolnensis
  - †Neptunea teglandae
- Nerita
  - †Nerita triangulata
- Neverita
  - †Neverita globosa
  - †Neverita jamesae
  - †Neverita reclusiana
- †Nitidavenus
  - Cf. †Nitidavenus conradi
- Nucella
  - †Nucella decemcostata
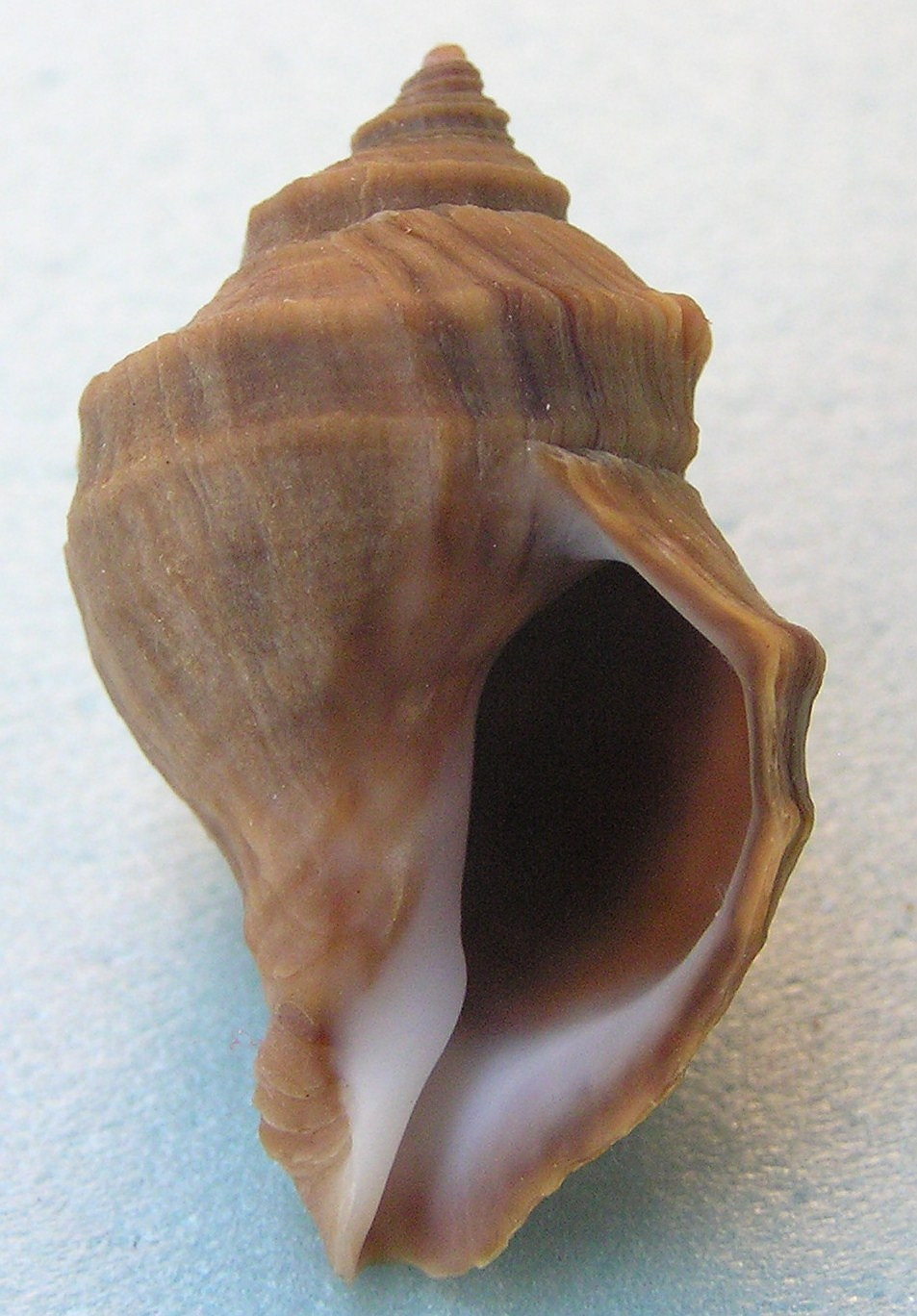
  - Shell of a Nucella lamellosa murex snail
    Nucella lamellosa
- †Nucleolaria
  - †Nucleolaria cowlitziana – type locality for species
- Nucula
  - †Nucula hannibali
- Nuculana
  - †Nuculana aikiensis
  - †Nuculana alkiensis
  - †Nuculana calkinsi
  - †Nuculana chehalisensis
  - †Nuculana cowlitzensis (syn=Leda cowlitzensis)
  - Cf. †Nuculana elmana
  - †Nuculana grasslei
  - †Nuculana posterolaevia – type locality for species
  - †Nuculana vaderensis
  - †Nuculana washingtoni

=== Molluscs O ===
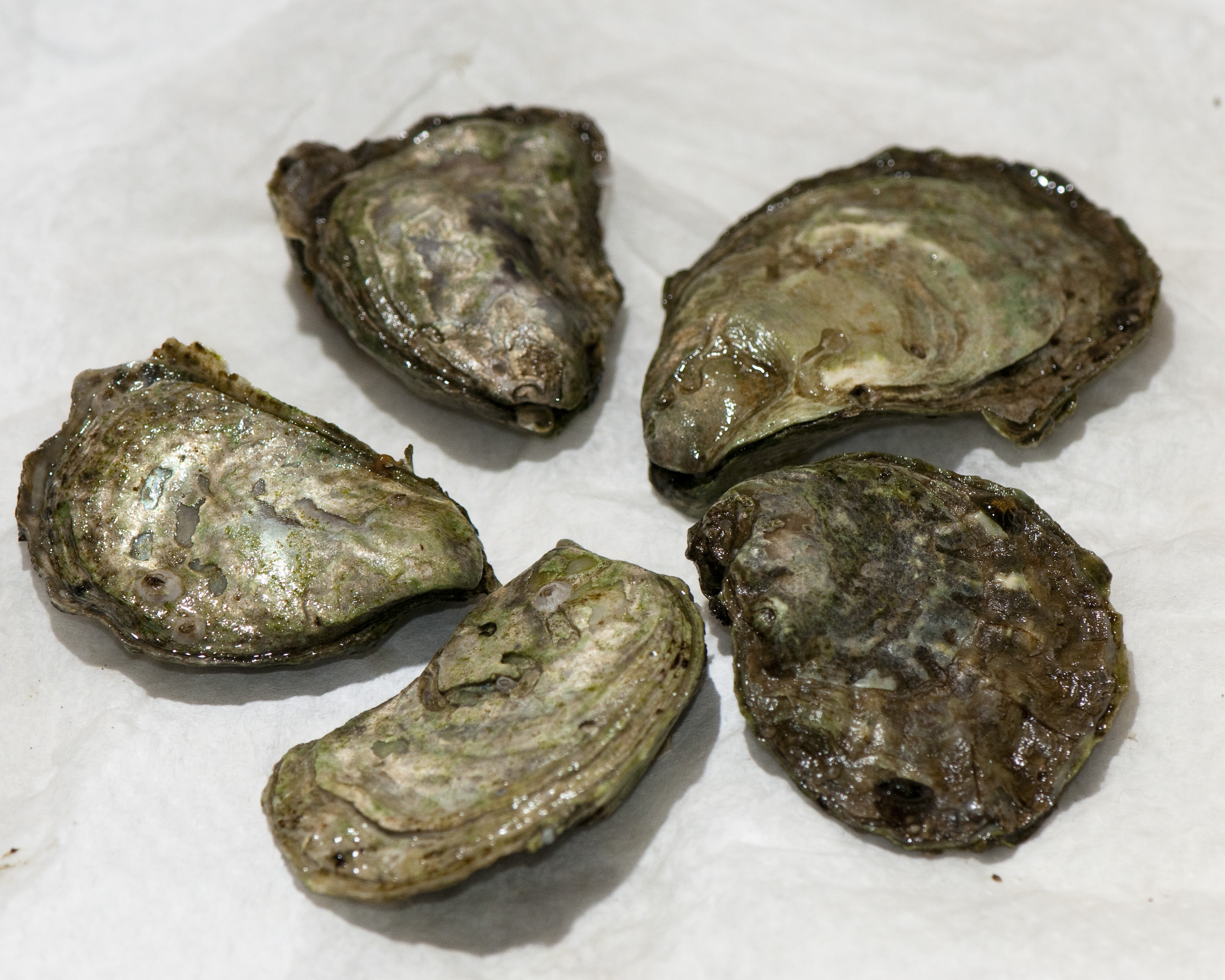
Five modern Ostrea lurida, or Olympic oysters

- Odostomia
  - Cf. †Odostomia winlockiana
- †Olequahia
  - †Olequahia washingtoniana
- Olivella
  - †Olivella mathewsonii
- Opalia
  - †Opalia bravinderi
- Ophiodermella
  - †Ophiodermella olympicensis
- Ostrea
  - Ostrea lurida

=== Molluscs P ===
- †Pachycrommium
  - †Pachycrommium clarki
  - †Pachycrommium hendoni
- Pandora
  - †Pandora vanwinkleae
  - †Pandora washingtonensis
- Panopea
  - †Panopea abrupta
  - †Panopea ramonensis
- Parvamussium
  - †Parvamussium stanfordense
- Patelloida
  - †Patelloida tejonensis
  - †Patelloida vancouverensis
- Patinopecten
  - †Patinopecten dilleri
- Pecten
  - †Pecten clallamensis
- †Perse? – tentative report
- Persicula
- Pitar
  - †Pitar avenalensis
  - †Pitar californiana
  - †Pitar (Lammelliconcha) eocenica
  - †Pitar quadratus
  - Cf. †Pitar soledadensis
  - †Pitar wasana
- Plagiocardium
  - †Plagiocardium breweri
- Pleurofusia
  - †Pleurofusia cowlitzensis (syn=Turricula cowlitzensis)
- Polinices
  - †Polinices gesteri
  - †Polinices hornii
  - †Polinices lewisii
  - †Polinices rectus
  - †Polinices victorianus
  - †Polinices washingtonensis
- Poromya
  - †Poromya teglandae
- Portlandia
  - †Portlandia chehalisensis - type locality for the species (synonym=Yoldia chehalisensis)
  - †Portlandia packardi
- †Potamides
  - †Potamides lewisiana
  - †Potamides packardi
- †Priscofusus
  - †Priscofusus chehalisensis
  - Cf. †Priscofusus geniculus
  - †Priscofusus goweri
  - †Priscofusus sanctaecrucis
  - †Priscofusus slipensis
  - †Priscofusus stewarti
- †Provanna
  - †Provanna antiqua
- Psammacoma
  - †Psammacoma arctata
- Pseudocardium
  - †Pseudocardium packardi (syn=Spisula packardi)
- Pseudoliva
  - †Pseudoliva lineata
- Pteria
  - †Pteria clarki
  - Cf. †Pteria pellucida
- Purpura
  - †Purpura lurida
- Pyramidella
  - †Pyramidella vaderensis

=== Molluscs R ===
- Rectiplanes? – tentative report
- Retusa
  - †Retusa tantilla
- Rimella
  - †Rimella elongata

=== Molluscs S ===
- Saxidomus
  - †Saxidomus giganteus
- Scalina
  - †Scalina lincolnensis
- Scaphander
  - †Scaphander (Mirascapha) costata
  - †Scaphander washingtonensis
- †Schedocardia
  - †Schedocardia brewerii (syn=Acanthocardia brewerii)
- Semicassis
  - †Semicassis pyshtensis
- Septifer
  - †Septifer dichotomus
- Serripes
  - †Serripes groenlandicus
- Sinum
  - †Sinum obliquum
  - Cf. †Sinum occidentalis
  - †Sinum scopulosum
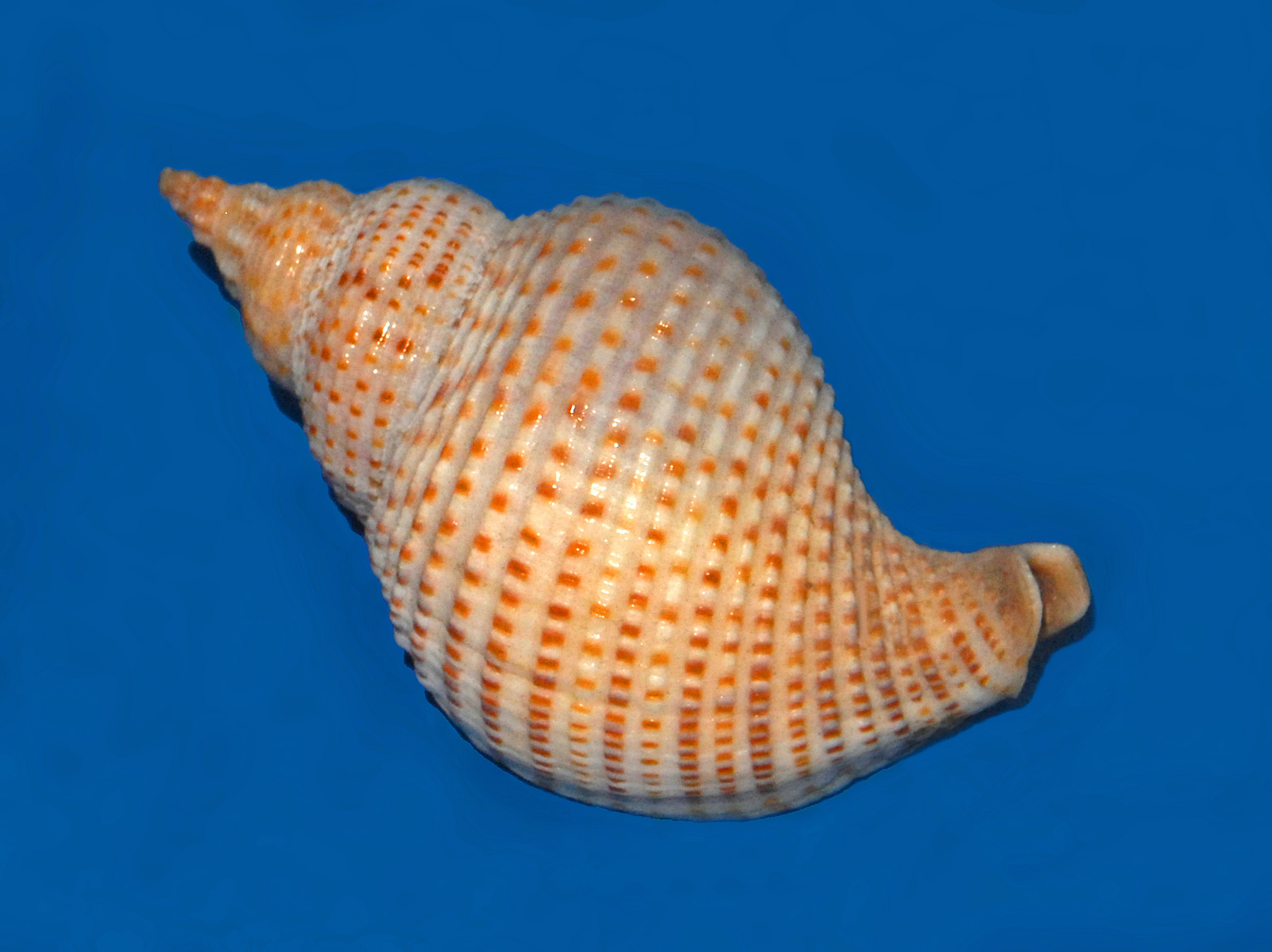
- Shell of the whelk sea snail Siphonalia
  Siphonalia
  - †Siphonalia bicarinata
  - †Siphonalia sopenahensis
- Solamen
  - †Solamen snavelyi
- Solariella
  - †Solariella (Solariella) olequahensis
  - †Solariella cicca
  - †Solariella garrardensis
  - †Solariella kincaidi
- Solen
  - †Solen columbianus
  - †Solen sicarius
- Solena
  - †Solena clarki
  - †Solena columbina
  - †Solena conradi
  - Cf. †Solena parallelus
- †Spirocrypta
  - †Spirocrypta pileum
- Spirotropis
  - †Spirotropis kincaidi
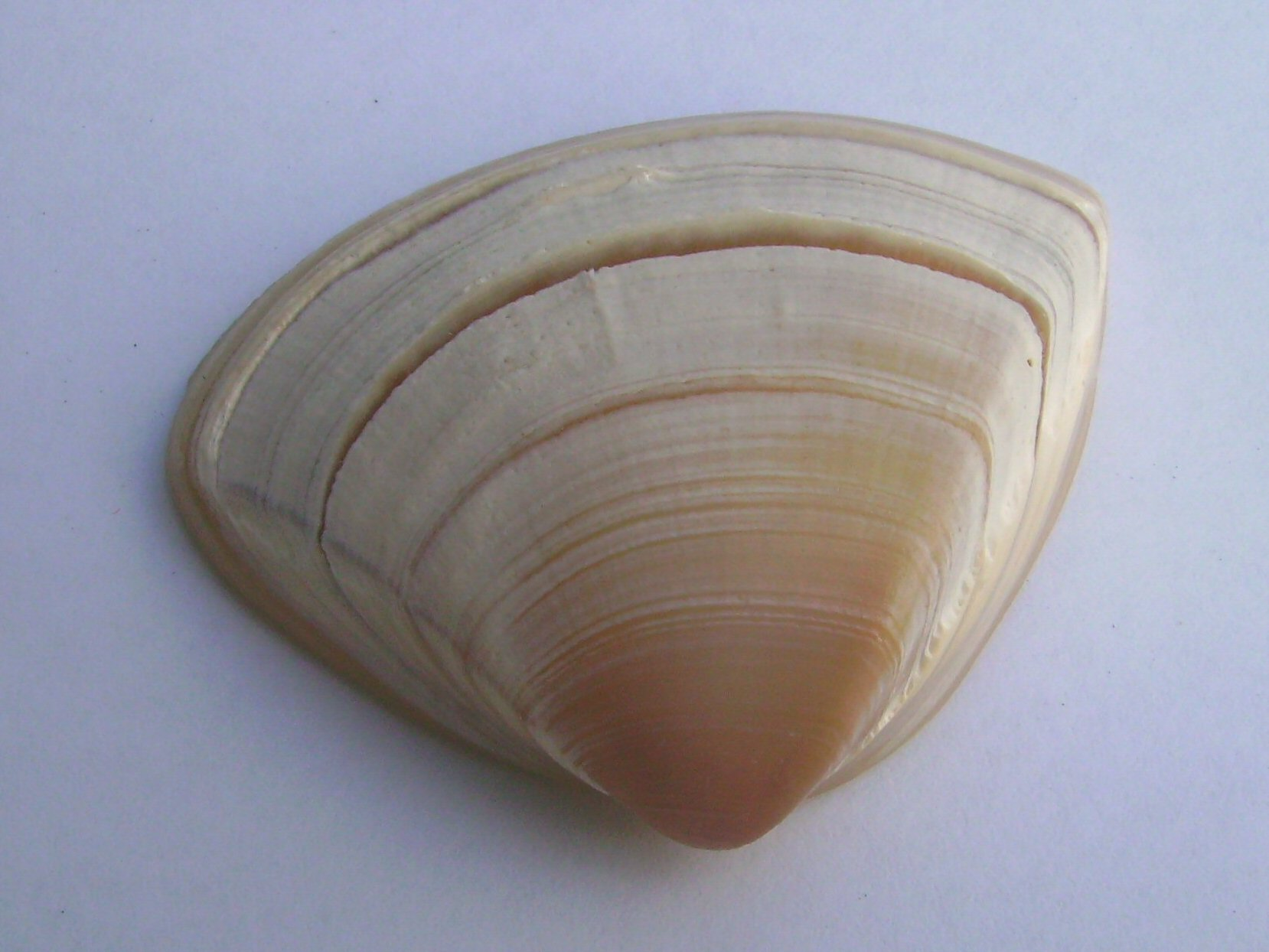
- Shell of a Spisula, or surf clam
  Spisula
  - Cf. †Spisula hannibali
  - †Spisula sookensis
  - †Spisula twinensis
- Spondylus
  - †Spondylus carlosensis
- Stenoplax
  - †Stenoplax quimperensis
- †Sulcobuccinum
  - †Sulcobuccinum dilleri
- †Sulcocypraea
  - †Sulcocypraea mathewsonii
- Surculites
  - †Surculites mathewsoni
  - †Surculites wynoocheensis? – tentative report
- Sveltella
  - †Sveltella keaseyensis? – tentative report

=== Molluscs T ===
- †Tejonia
  - †Tejonia moragai
- Tellina
  - †Tellina cowlitzensis
  - †Tellina emacerata
  - †Tellina soledadensis
- Tenagodus
  - †Tenagodus bajaensis
- Teredo
  - Undescribed Cowlitz and Crescent Formation fossils
- Thais
  - †Thais lamellosa
- Thracia
  - †Thracia dilleri
  - †Thracia schencki
  - †Thracia trapezoides
- Thyasira
  - †Thyasira folgeri
  - †Thyasira hannibali
  - †Thyasira peruviana? – tentative report
  - †Thyasira xylodia - type locality for species
- Tivela
  - †Tivela (Pachydesma) aragoensis
- †Tivelina
  - †Tivelina vaderensis - type locality for species
- Tresus
  - †Tresus capax
  - †Tresus nuttallii
- Trochita
  - Unidentified Oligocene Clallam Formation fossils
- Tudicla
  - †Tudicla blakei
  - †Tudicla trophonoides
- Turcica
  - †Turcica caffea
- Turricula
  - †Turricula ornata
  - †Turricula washingtonensis
- Turris
  - †Turris perversa
  - †Turris pulchra (syn=Hemipleurotoma pulchra)
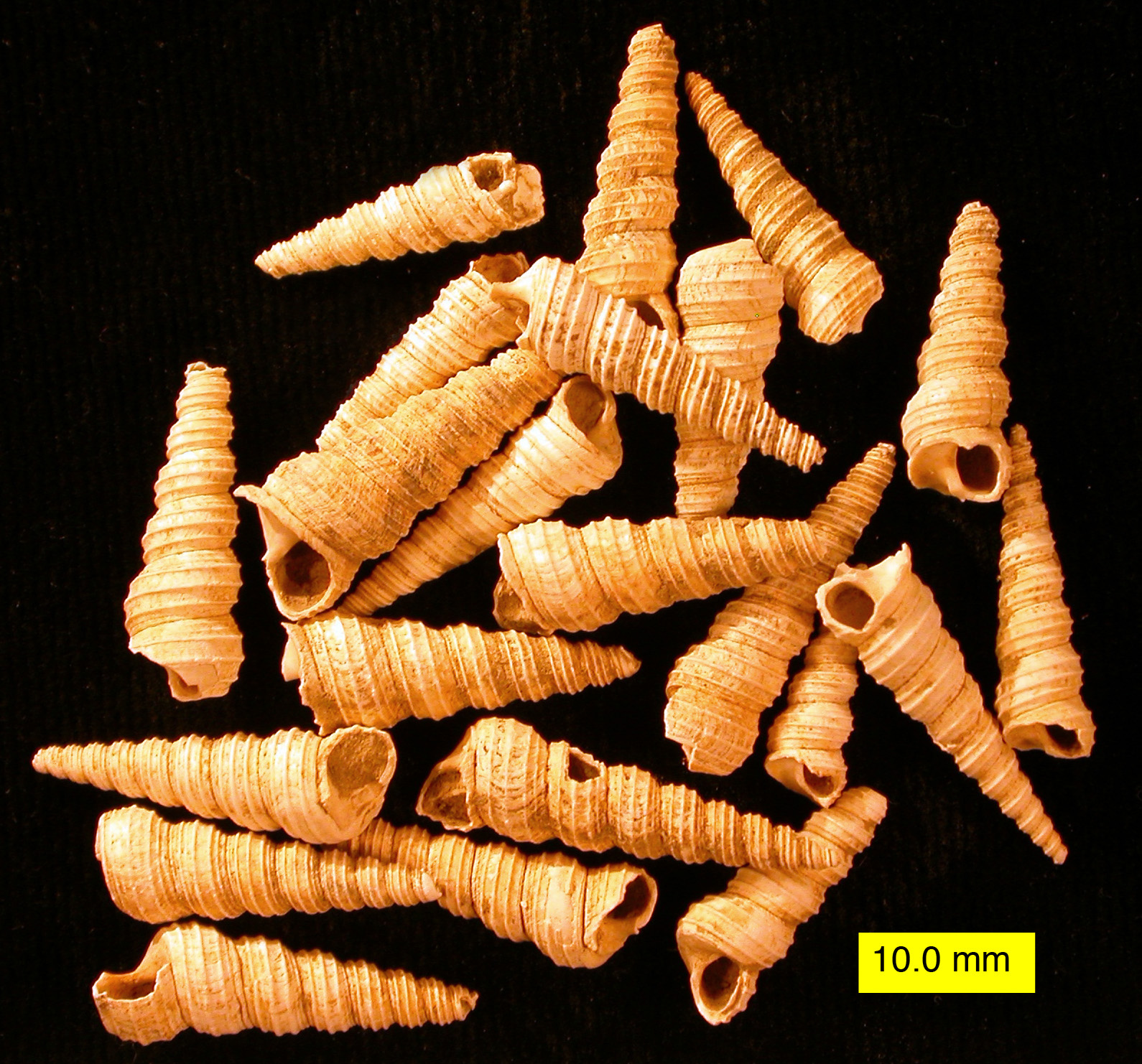
- Fossilized shells of the Late Jurassic-modern tower snail Turritella
  Turritella
  - †Turritella andersoni
  - †Turritella blakeleyensis
  - Cf. †Turritella buwaldana
  - †Turritella oregonensis
  - †Turritella porterensis
  - †Turritella uvasana
  - Cf. †Turritella vaderensis
  - †Turritella wasana

=== Molluscs U ===
- Urosalpinx
  - †Urosalpinx hannibali

=== Molluscs V ===
- Venericardia
  - †Venericardia castor
  - †Venericardia hannai
  - †Venericardia hornii
  - Cf. †Venericardia weaveri
  - †Venericardia (Pacificor) clarki
- †Vertipecten
  - †Vertipecten fucanus
- Vesicomya
  - †Vesicomya chinookensis
- Volsella (mollusc)
  - †Volsella restorationensis
  - †Volsella trinominata

=== Molluscs W ===
- †Whitneyella
  - †Whitneyella gabbi
  - †Whitneyella markleyensis
  - †Whitneyella sinuata
  - †Whitneyella washingtoniana

=== Molluscs X ===
- Xenoturris
  - †Xenoturris antiselli
- †Xylodiscula
  - †Xylodiscula okutanii - type locality for species
  - †Xylodiscula vitrea - type locality for species

=== Molluscs Y ===
- Yoldia
  - †Yoldia astoriana
  - †Yoldia blakeleyensis - type locality for species
  - †Yoldia clallamensis – type locality for species
  - †Yoldia duprei - type locality for species
  - †Yoldia newcombi
  - †Yoldia olympiana
  - †Yoldia reagani
  - †Yoldia sammamishensis - type locality for the species
  - †Yoldia temblorensis
  - Cf. †Yoldia supramontereyensis - related form

== Arthropods ==
=== Arthropods A ===
- Acidota
  - Acidota crenata
- Aclypea
  - Aclypea bituberosa
- Acrulia
  - †Acrulia tumidula
- Actium
  - Undescribed Klaloch site subfossil(s)
- †Adamsochrysa
  - †Adamsochrysa wilsoni – type locality for species
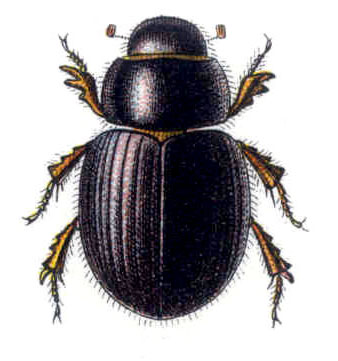
- Illustration of an Aegialia dung beetle
  Aegialia
  - Aegialia cylindrica
  - Aegialia lacustris
- Agabus
  - Undescribed Olympia beds Formation subfossil(s)
- Agathidium
  - Undescribed Klaloch site subfossil(s)
- Agonum
  - Agonum cupreum
  - Agonum ferruginosum
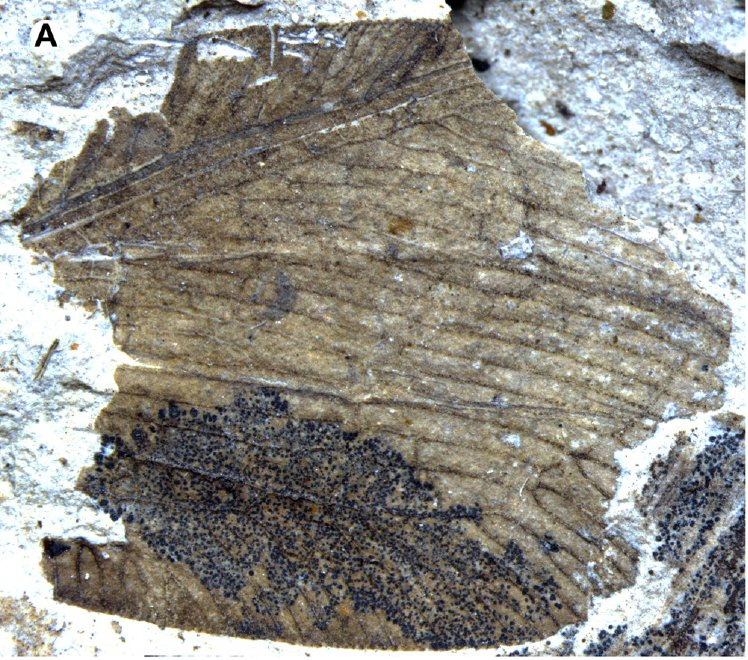
- Fossilized wing and holotype specimen of the Eocene lacewing Ainigmapsychops
  †Ainigmapsychops – type locality for genus
  - †Ainigmapsychops inexspectatus – type locality for species
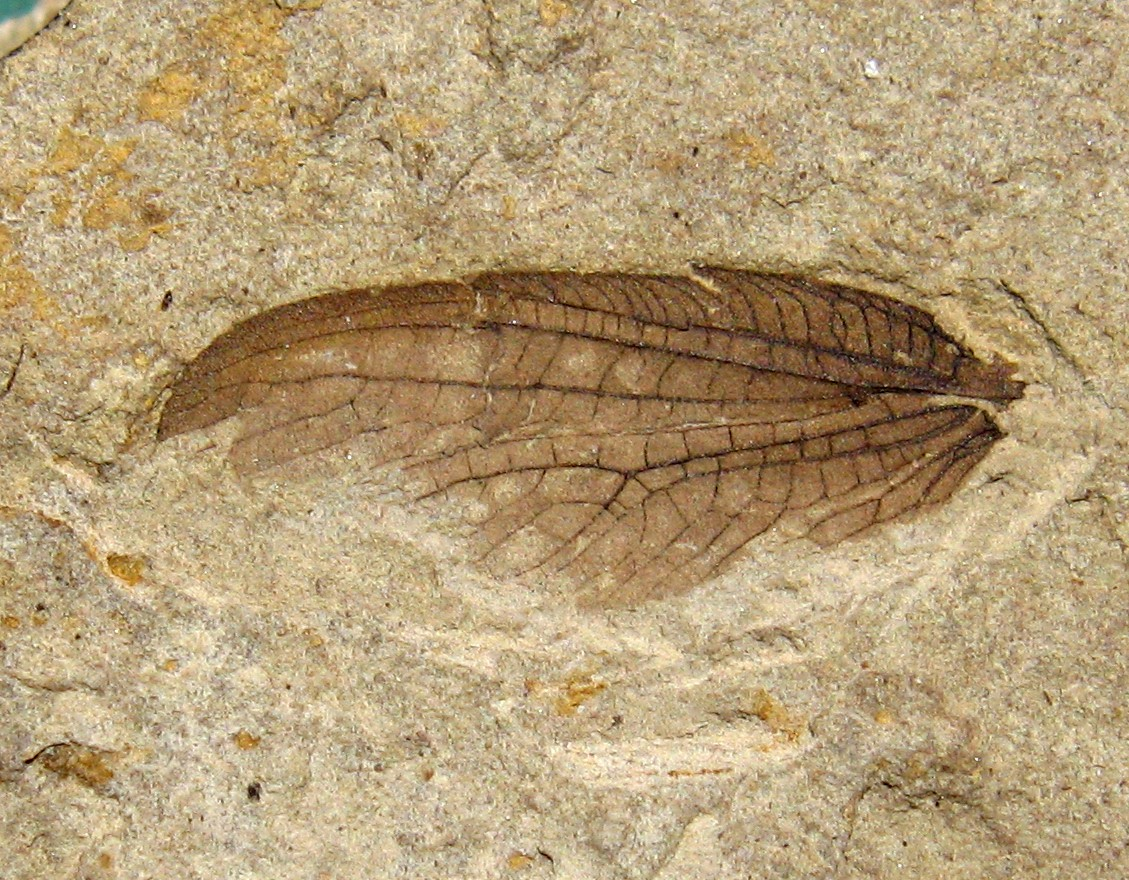
- Fossilized wing found in Republic; the holotype specimen of the Eocene lacewing Allorapisma
  †Allorapisma – type locality for genus
  - †Allorapisma chuorum – type locality for species
- Alniphagus
  - Alniphagus aspericollis
- Altica
  - Cf. †Altica lazulina
- Amara
  - Cf. Amara conflata
- Anthrax
  - †Anthrax dentoni – type locality for species
- †Antiquiala
  - †Antiquiala snyderae
- Aphodius
  - Undescribed Klaloch site subfossil(s)
- Apion
  - Undescribed Klaloch site subfossil(s)
- †Aporolepas
  - undescribed Ypresian-Bartionian Crescent Formation fossil(s)
- Aphrophora
  - undescribed Ypresian Klondike Mountain Formation fossil(s)
- Arcoscalpellum
  - †Arcoscalpellum knapptonensis – type locality for species
  - †Arcoscalpellum raricostatum
- Arpedium
  - Arpedium cribratum
- Artochia
  - †Artochia productifrons
- Asiorestia
  - Asiorestia pallida
- Atomaria
  - Undescribed Olympia beds Formation subfossil(s)
- Auleutes
  - Cf. Auleutes epilobii

=== Arthropods B ===
- Balanus
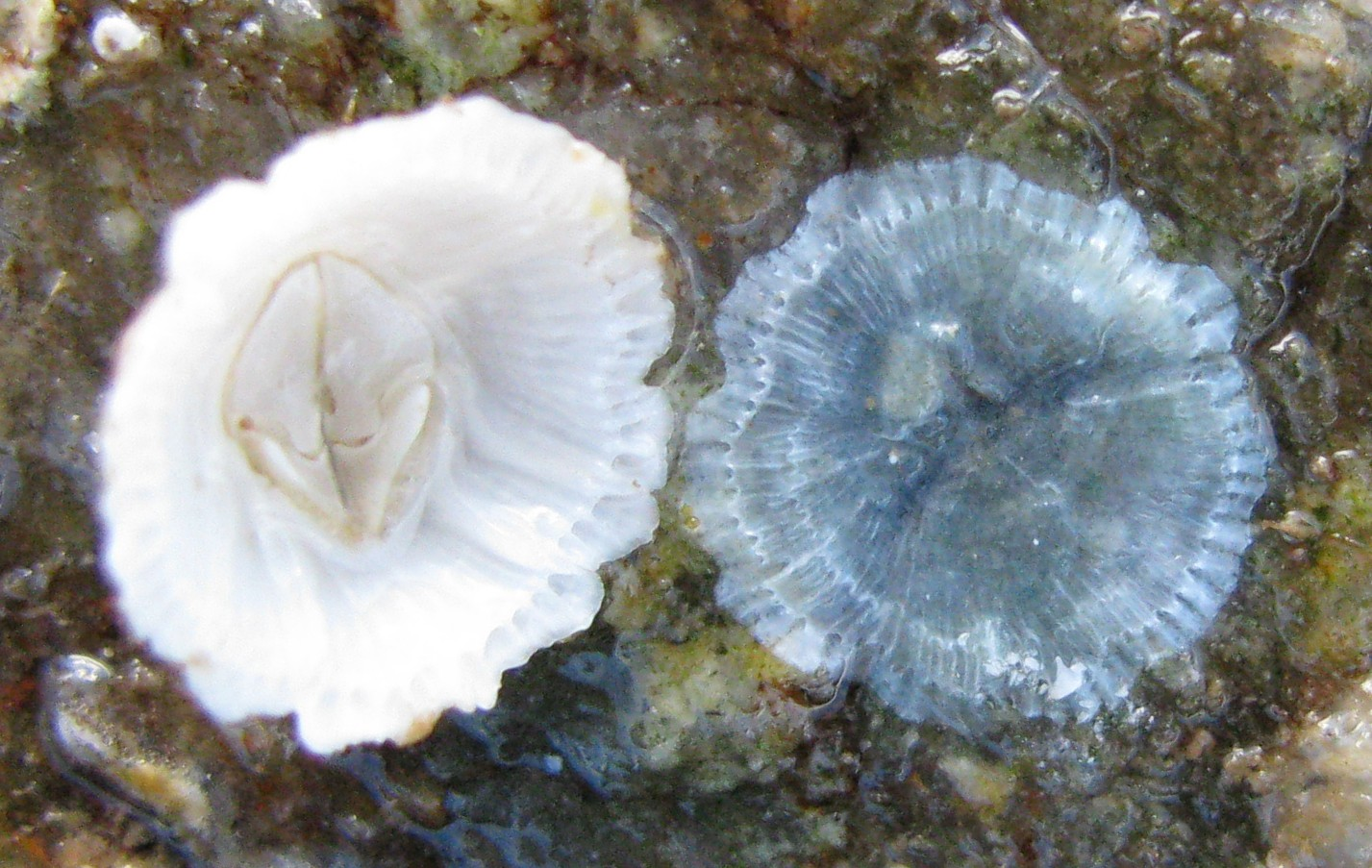
  - Shell (left, internal view) and calcified basis (right) of a modern Balanus crenatus acorn barnacle
    Balanus crenatus
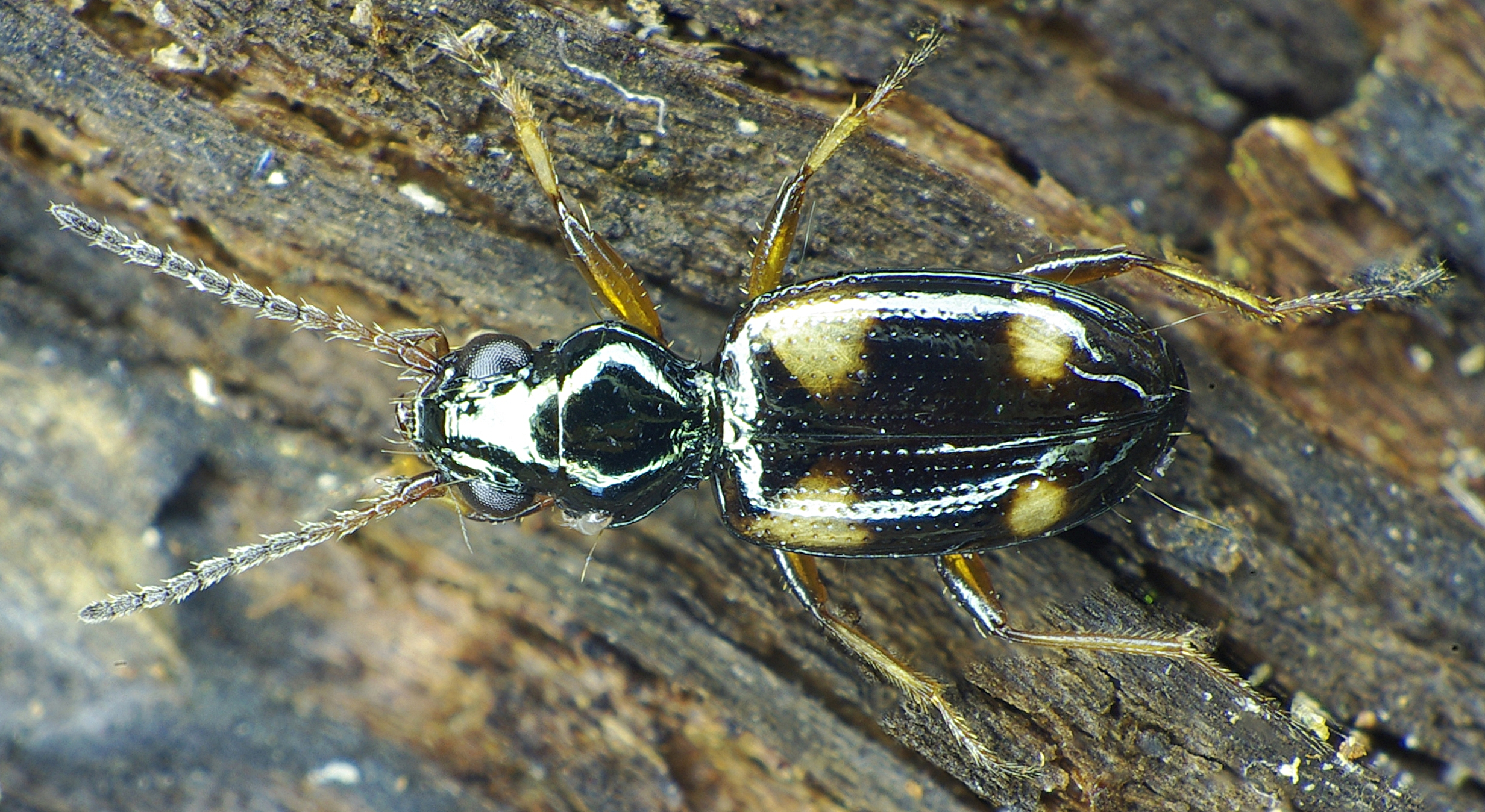
- A living Bembidion ground beetle
  Bembidion
  - Bembidion bimaculatum
  - Bembidion fortestriatum
  - Bembidion haruspex
  - Bembidion inaequale
  - Bembidion nigripes
  - Bembidion planiusculum
  - Bembidion rusticum
- Bibio
  - Undescribed Miocene Latah Formation fossil(s)
- Bledius
  - Undescribed Klaloch site subfossils
  - Undescribed Olympia beds Formation subfossil
- †Bombus
  - †Bombus proavus – type locality for species
- Byrrhus
  - Undescribed Olympia beds Formation subfossil

=== Arthropods C ===
- Calathus
  - Calathus ruficollis
- Caligodorus
  - Caligodorus opacus
- Callianassa
  - †Callianassa knapptonensis
  - †Callianassa oregonensis
  - †Callianassa twinensis
  - Cf. †Callianassa porterensis
  - undescribed Oligocene Makah Formation fossil
  - undescribed Oligocene Pysht Formation fossil
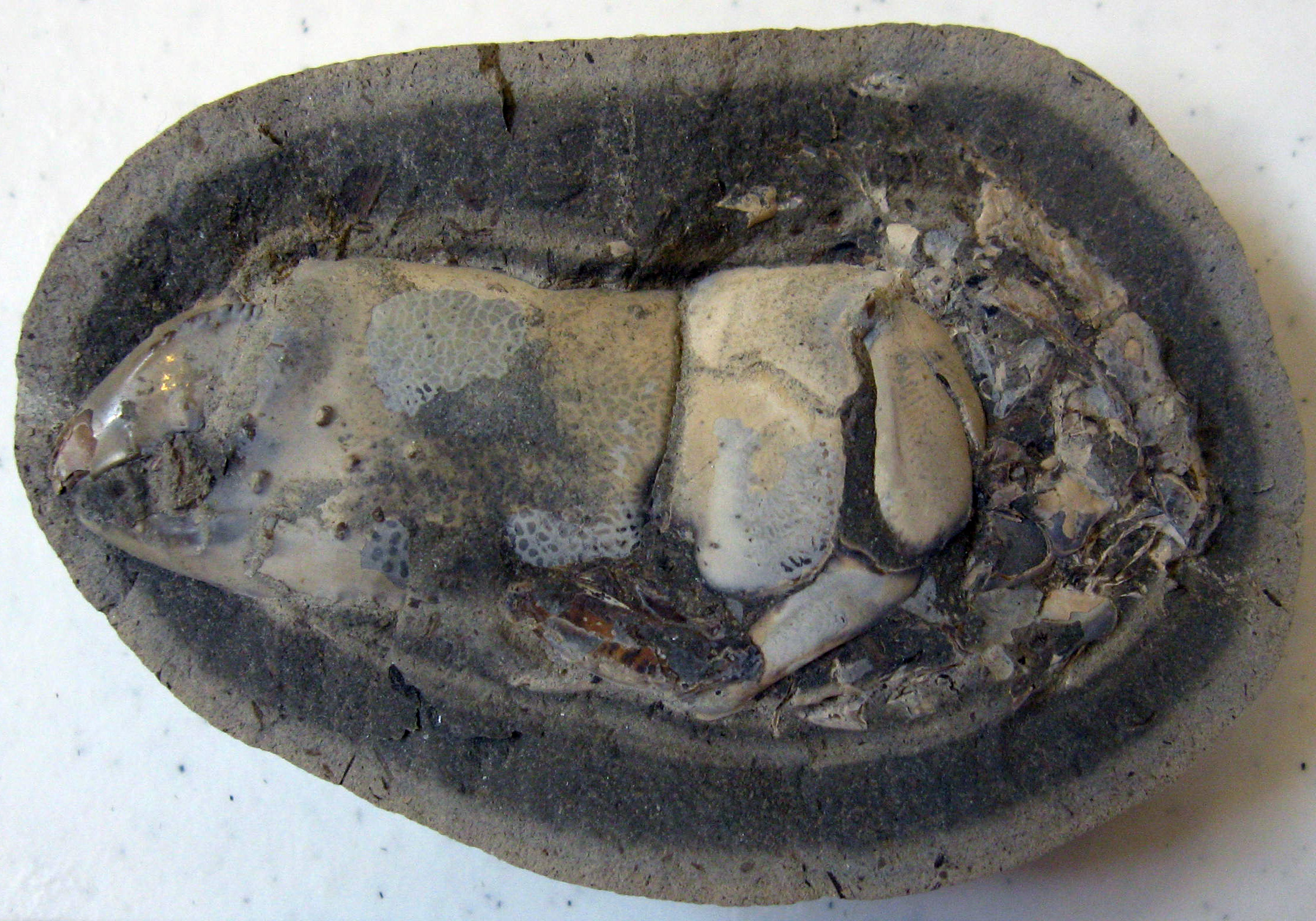
- A fossilized pincer found in Clallam County belonging to the Oligocene mud shrimp Callianopsis clallamensis
  Callianopsis
  - †Callianopsis clallamensis - type locality for species
- Calosoma
  - †Calosoma fernquisti – type locality for species
- Cancer
  - †Cancer bainbridgensis
- Carabus
  - Carabus taedatus
- Catops
- Cercyon
  - Cf. †Cercyon luniger
- Chlaenius
  - Chlaenius interruptus
- Cicindela
  - Cicindela oregona
- †Cimbrophlebia
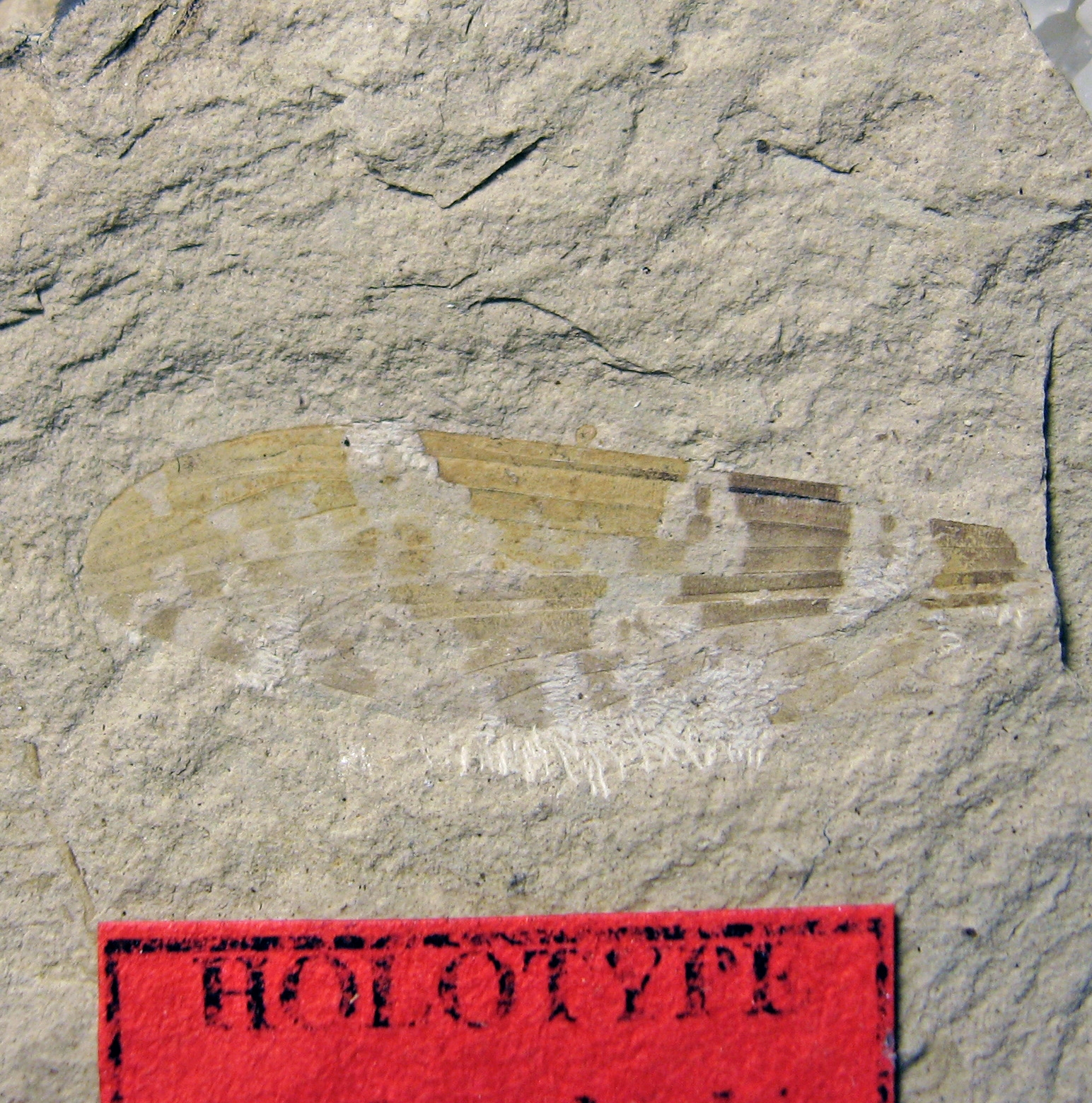
  - Fossilized wing found in Republic; the holotype specimen of the Eocene scorpionfly Cimbrophlebia brooksi
    †Cimbrophlebia brooksi – type locality for species
  - †Cimbrophlebia westae – type locality for species
- Cleptelmis
  - †Cleptelmis ornata
- †Coeloma
  - Coeloma martinezensis? - tentative report
- Colymbetes
- Corixa
- Corticaria
- Cossonus
- Cryptophagus
- Curimopsis
  - Curimopsis albonotata
- Cymbiodyta
- Cytilus
  - Cytilus alternatus
  - Cytilus mimicus

=== Arthropods D ===
- Dascillus
  - †Dascillus latahensis – type locality for species
- Dendroctonus
  - Dendroctonus rufipennis
- Dianous
  - †Dianous nitidulus
- Diapterna
  - Diapterna hamata
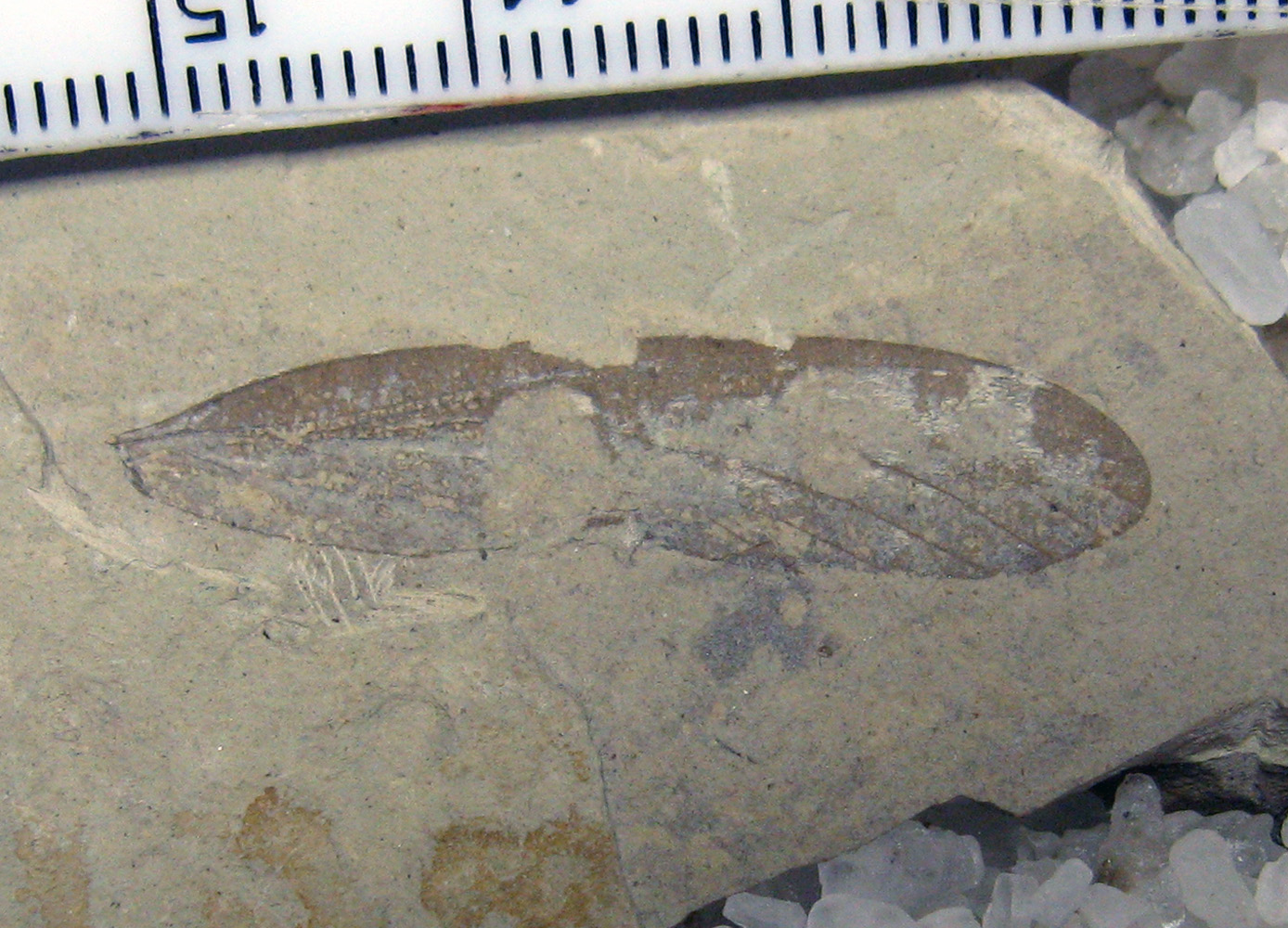
- Dinokanaga andersoni Klondike Mountain Formation Ypresian, Republic
  †Dinokanaga
  - †Dinokanaga andersoni – type locality for species
  - †Dinokanaga dowsonae
  - †Dinokanaga sternbergi – type locality for species
- †Dysagrion
  - Dysagrion pruettae Klondike Mountain Formation Ypresian, Republic
    †Dysagrion pruettae - type locality for species
- †Dysagrionites
  - †Dysagrionites delinei - type locality for species
- Dyschirius (syn=Dyschiriodes)
  - Dyschirius laevifasciatus
  - Dyschirius montanus
  - Undescribed Olympia beds Formation subfossil
- Dytiscus
  - †Dytiscus latahensis – type locality for species

=== Arthropods E ===
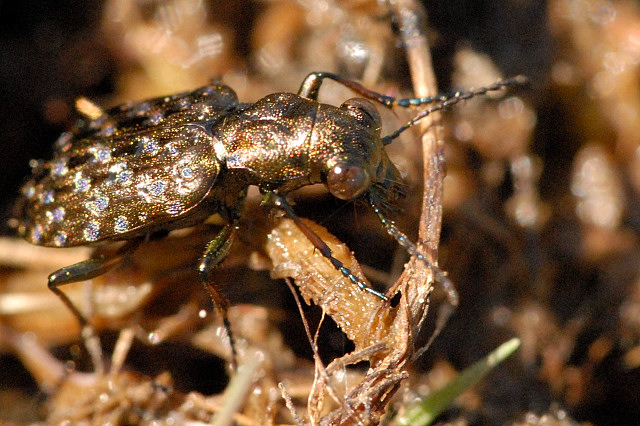
- A living Elaphrus ground beetle
  Elaphrus
  - †Elaphrus americanus
  - †Elaphrus californicus
  - †Elaphrus clairvillei
  - †Elaphrus purpurans
- †Eoceneithycerus - type locality for genus
  - †Eoceneithycerus carpenteri - type locality for species
- †Eoprephasma – type locality for genus
  - †Eoprephasma hichensi – type locality for species
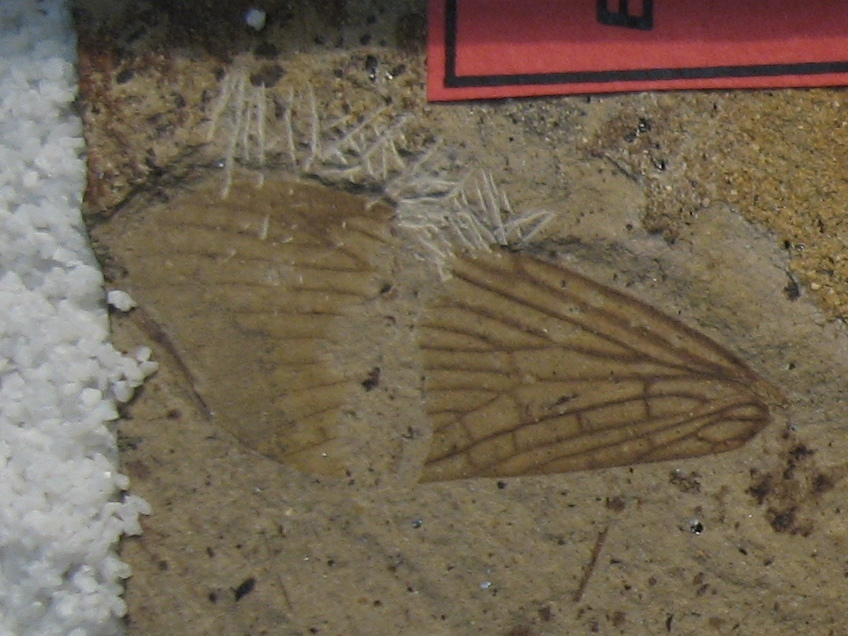
- Fossilized wing found in Republic; the holotype specimen of the Eocene scorpionfly Eorpa elverumi
  †Eorpa
  - †Eorpa elverumi – type locality for species
  - †Eorpa ypsipeda? – tentative report
- †Eosphecium
  - Undescribed Ypresian klondike Mountain Formation fossils
- †Eourocerus - Type locality for genus
  - †Eourocerus anguliterreus - type locality for species
- Epophthalmia
  - †Epophthalmia biordinata – type locality for species

=== Arthropods F ===
- †Folindusia
  - †Folindusia miocenica – type locality for species
- Foveoscapha
  - Undescribed Klaloch site subfossils

=== Arthropods G ===
- Galeruca
  - Galeruca rudis
- Gastrophysa
  - Gastrophysa cyanea
- Geodromicus
  - Undescribed Olympia beds Formation subfossils
- Georissus
  - Undescribed Olympia beds Formation subfossils
- Gerris
  - Undescribed Olympia beds Formation subfossils
- †Glyphithyreus
  - †Glyphithyreus weaveri
- Gymnusa
  - Undescribed Klaloch site subfossils
- Gyrinus
  - Undescribed Olympia beds Formation subfossils

=== Arthropods H ===
- Hapalaraea
  - Undescribed Klaloch site subfossils
- Helophorus
  - Helophorus lacustris
  - Cf. Helophorus oregonensis
- Hesperibalanus
  - †Hesperibalanus cornwalli – type locality for species
  - Cf. †Hesperibalanus sookensis
- Heterlimnius
  - Heterlimnius koebelei
- Heterosilpha
  - Heterosilpha ramosa
- Hydrobius
  - Hydrobius fuscipes
- Hydrothassa
  - †Hydrothassa vittata
- Hygrotus
  - Undescribed Olympia beds Formation subfossils
- Hylurgops
  - †Hylurgops rugipennis
- Hymenarcys
  - †Hymenarcys cridlandi – type locality for species

=== Arthropods I ===
- †Idemlinea- Type locality for genus
  - †Idemlinea versatilis - Type locality for species
- Ilybius
  - Ilybius quadrimaculatus
- Ischnosoma
  - Ischnosoma pictum
- Isochnus
  - Isochnus rufipes
- †Ithyceroides – type locality for genus
  - †Ithyceroides klondikensis – type locality for species

=== Arthropods K ===
- Kalissus
  - Kalissus nitidus
- †Klondikia – type locality for genus
  - †Klondikia whiteae – type locality for species

=== Arthropods L ===
- Laccobius
  - Cf. Laccobius ellipticus
- Lanternarius
  - Lanternarius parrotus
- Lapsus
  - Lapsus tristis
- †Latahcoris – type locality for genus
  - †Latahcoris spectatus – type locality for species
- Leiodes
  - Undescribed Olympia beds Formation subfossil(s)
- Lepidophorus
  - Lepidophorus alternatus
- †Leptostigma
  - †Leptostigma alaemacula – type locality for species
  - †Leptostigma brevilatum?
- Cf. Lepyrus
  - Undescribed Olympia beds Formation subfossil.
- Lioligus
  - Lioligus nitidus
- Lioon
  - Lioon simplicipes
- Liothorax
  - Liothorax alternatus
- Lophomastix
  - †Lophomastix altoonaensis
  - †Lophomastix antiqua
  - †Lophomastix boykoi
  - †Lophomastix kellyi
- Loricera
  - Loricera decempunctata

=== Arthropods M ===
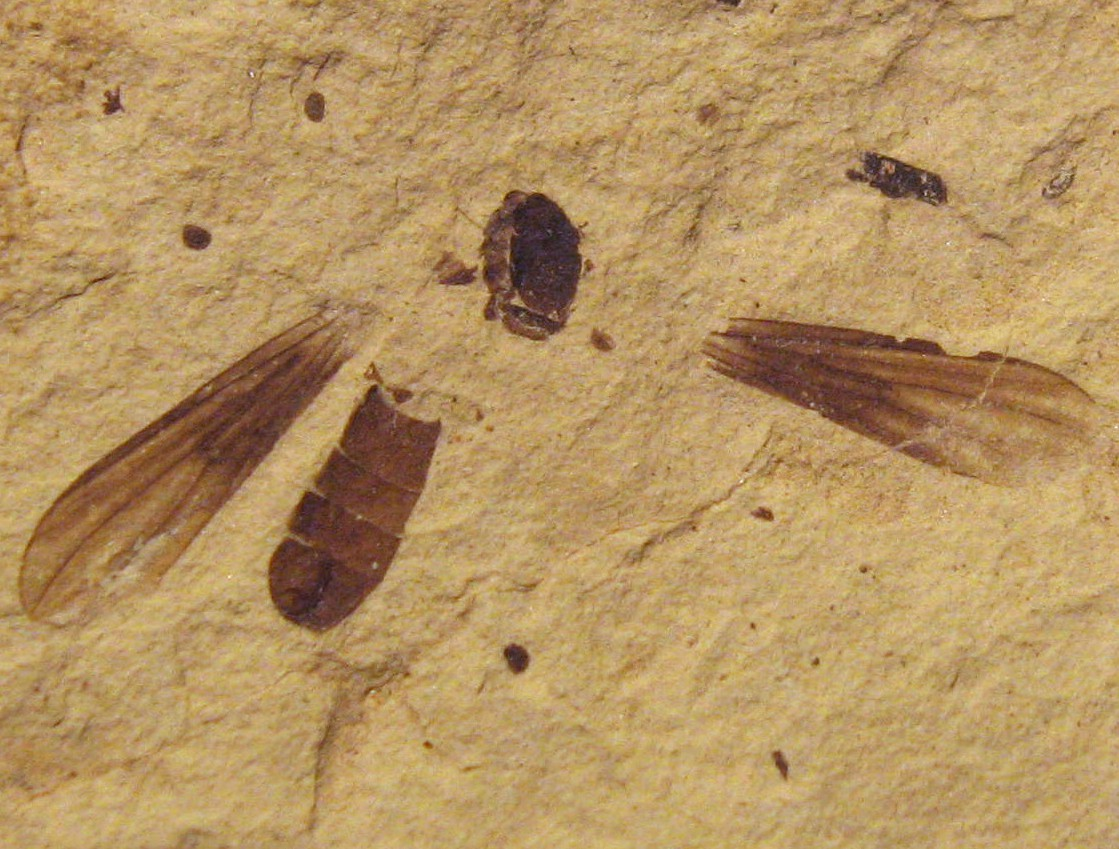
Metanephrocerus belgardeae Klondike Mountain Formation Ypresian, Republic

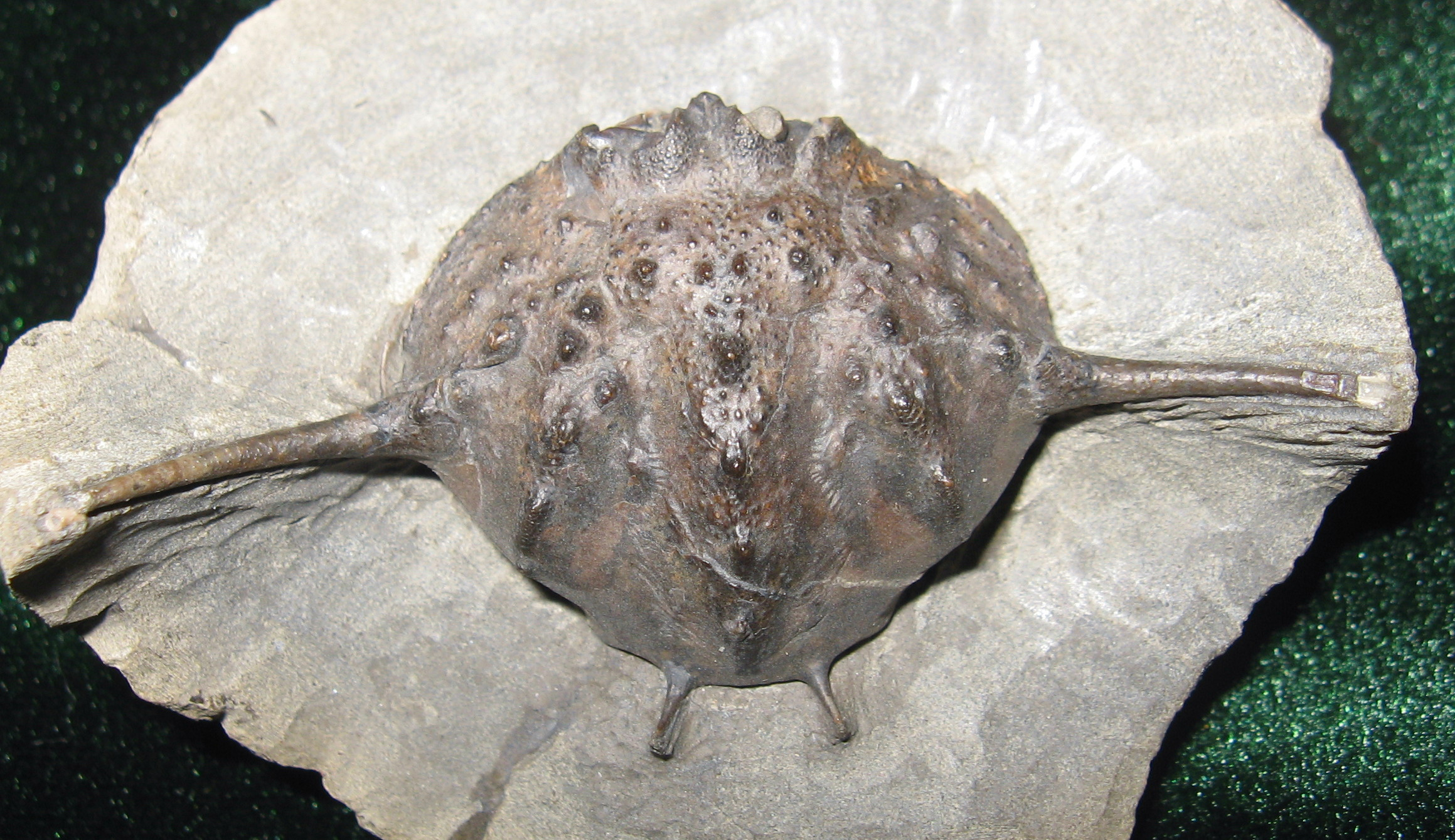
Mursia marcusana Blakeley Formation Oligocene, King County

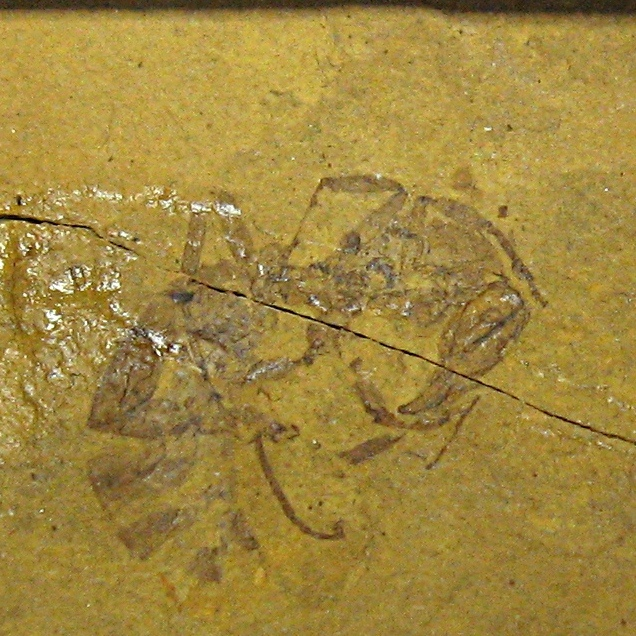
Myrmeciites species Klondike Mountain Formation Ypresian, Republic

- Magdalis
- †Megaraphidia
  - †Megaraphidia klondika - type locality for species
- Megarthrus
- †Megokkos
  - †Megokkos alaskensis
  - †Megokkos feldmanni
  - †Megokkos macrospinus
- Melanoides
  - †Melanoides fettkei
- †Metacarcinus
  - †Metacarcinus starri
- †Metanephrocerus
  - †Metanephrocerus belgardeae – type locality for species
- Microedus
- Microlestes
- Micropeplus
  - †Micropeplus cribratus
  - †Micropeplus laticollis
  - †Micropeplus nelsoni
  - †Micropeplus punctatus
- †Miocordulia – type locality for genus
  - †Miocordulia latipennis – type locality for species
- †Miopsyche – type locality for genus
  - †Miopsyche alexanderi – type locality for species
  - †Miopsyche martynovi – type locality for species
- Morychus
  - †Morychus oblongus
- Munida
  - †Munida branti - type locality for species
  - †Munida witteae - type locality for species
- †Mursia
  - †Mursia marcusana
- Mycetoporus
  - †Mycetoporus punctatissimus
- †Myrmeciites
  - Unidentified Ypresian Klondike Mountain Formation fossils

=== Arthropods N ===
- Nebria
  - †Nebria metallica
  - †Nebria sahlbergii
- †Neoephemera
  - †Neoephemera antiqua – type locality for species
- Nephropsis
  - †Nephropsis larryi – type locality for species
- Nitidotachinus
  - Cf. †Nitidotachinus tachyporoides
- Notaris
  - †Notaris aethiops
  - †Notaris puncticollis
- Notiophilus
  - †Notiophilus aquaticus
  - †Notiophilus simulator
  - †Notiophilus sylvaticus
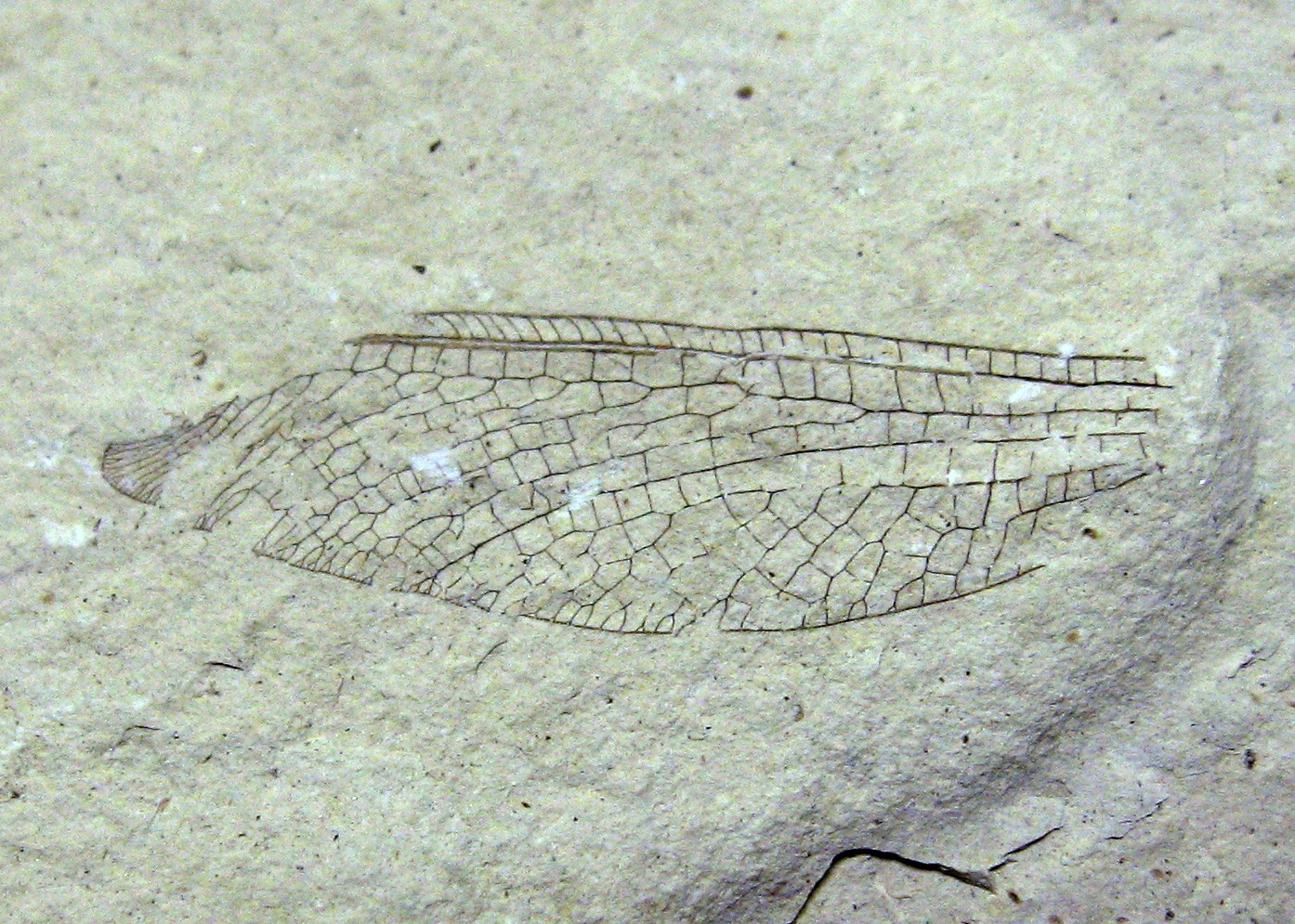
- Fossilized wing found in Ferry County; the holotype specimen of the Eocene lacewing Nymphes georgei
  Nymphes
  - †Nymphes georgei – type locality for species

=== Arthropods O ===
Okanagrion threadgillae

- Ochthebius
  - †Ochthebius discretus
  - Cf. †Ochthebius holmbergi
- Ocypus
- †Oecophylla
  - †Oecophylla kraussei – type locality for species
- †Okanagrion - type locality for genus
  - †Okanagrion dorrellae - type locality for species
  - †Okanagrion hobani
  - †Okanagrion liquetoalatum - type locality for species
  - †Okanagrion threadgillae - type locality for species
  - †Okanagrion worleyae - type locality for species
- †Okanopteryx
  - †Okanopteryx jeppesenorum - type locality for species
- Olophrum
  - †Olophrum boreale
  - †Olophrum consimile
- Opisthius
  - †Opisthius richardsoni
- †Orbitoplax
  - †Orbitoplax plafkeri
  - †Orbitoplax tuckerae
- Orchestes
  - †Orchestes pallicornis
- †Oregonina
  - †Oregonina leucosiae
- Cf. Oreodytes
- Orobanus
- Oropus
- †Osmylidia
  - †Osmylidia glastrai - type locality for species
- Oxytelus
  - Oxytelus laqueatus
  - Oxytelus niger

=== Arthropods P ===
- Paguristes
  - †Paguristes hokoensis
- †Palaeopsychops
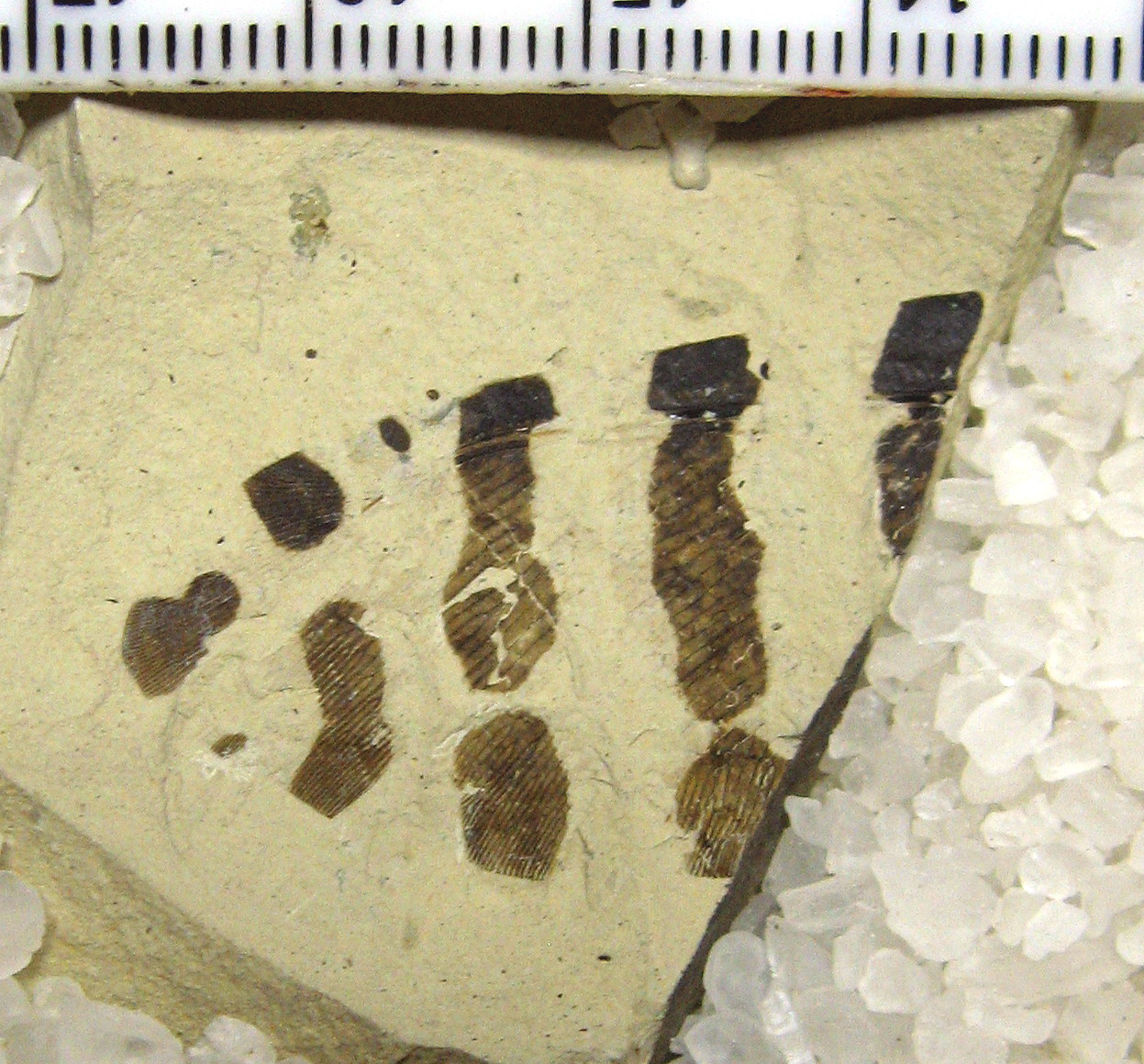
  - Eocene giant lacewing Palaeopsychops marringerae wing with color-patterning
    †Palaeopsychops marringerae – type locality for species
  - †Palaeopsychops timmi – type locality for species
- †Palecphora
  - Undescribed Ypresian Klondike Mountain Formation fossils
- Pardalosus
  - †Pardalosus pardalis
- Patrobus
  - †Patrobus fossifrons
  - †Patrobus stygicus
- Pelecomalium
  - †Pelecomalium testaceum
- Pelenomus
  - †Pelenomus squamosus
- Pelophila
  - †Pelophila borealis
- Periope
  - †Periope ivesi – type locality for species
- †Petrolystra
  - Undescribed Ypresian Klondike Mountain Formation fossils
- Phaedon
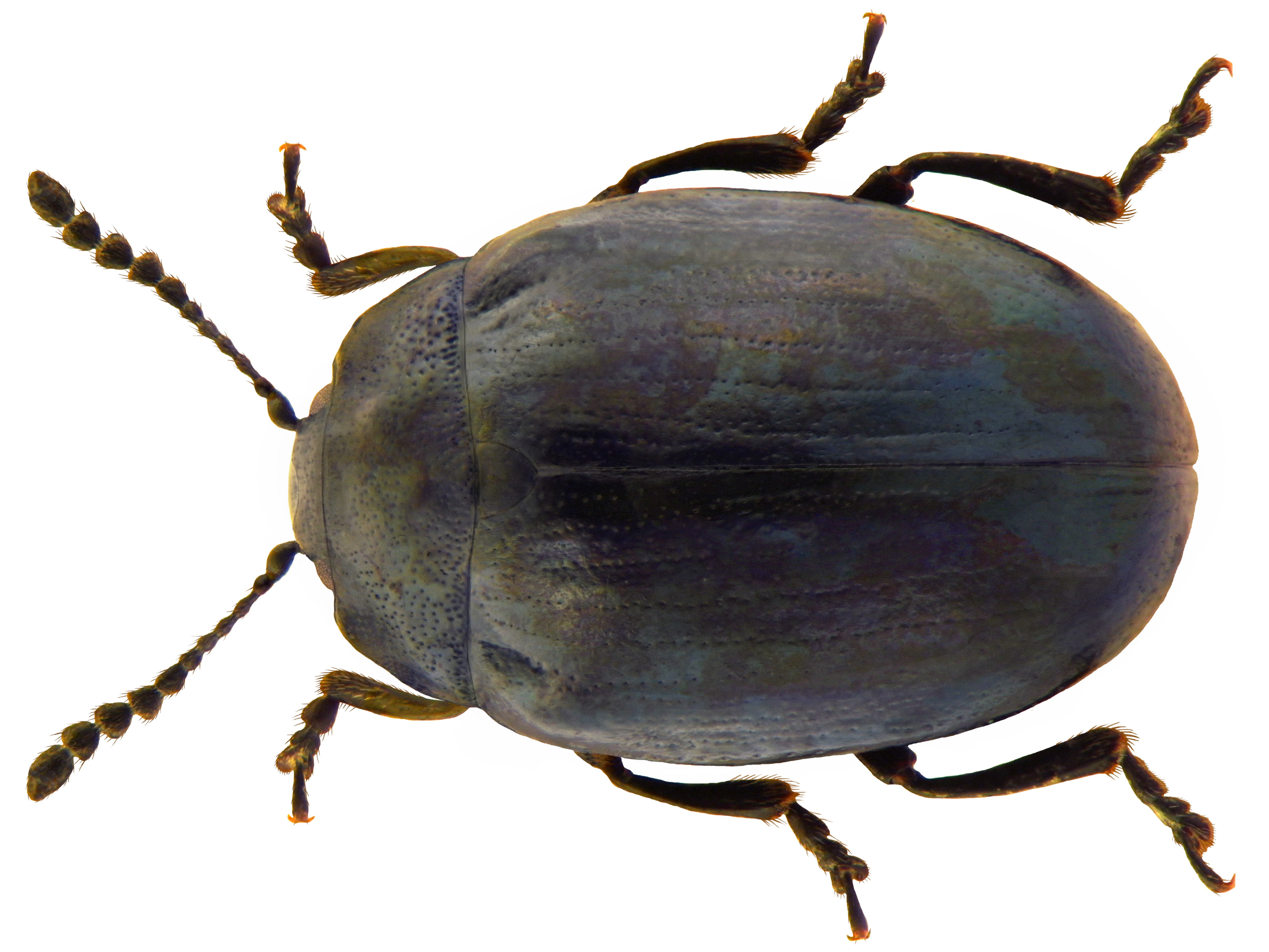
  - A living Phaedon armoraciae leaf beetle
    Phaedon armoraciae
  - †Phaedon oviforme
  - †Phaedon prasinellus
- Phlaeopterus
- Phloeosinus
  - Cf. †Phloeosinus keeni
- Phloeotribus
  - †Phloeotribus lecontei
- Phryganea
  - †Phryganea spokanensis – type locality for species
- Pityophthorus
  - †Pityophthorus digestus – or unidentified comparable form
  - †Pityophthorus nitidulus
- Planolinoides
  - †Planolinoides pectoralis
- Plateumaris
  - †Plateumaris dubia
  - †Plateumaris germari
  - †Plateumaris neomexicana
  - †Plateumaris nitida
- Platystethus
  - †Platystethus americanus
- †Polystoechotites
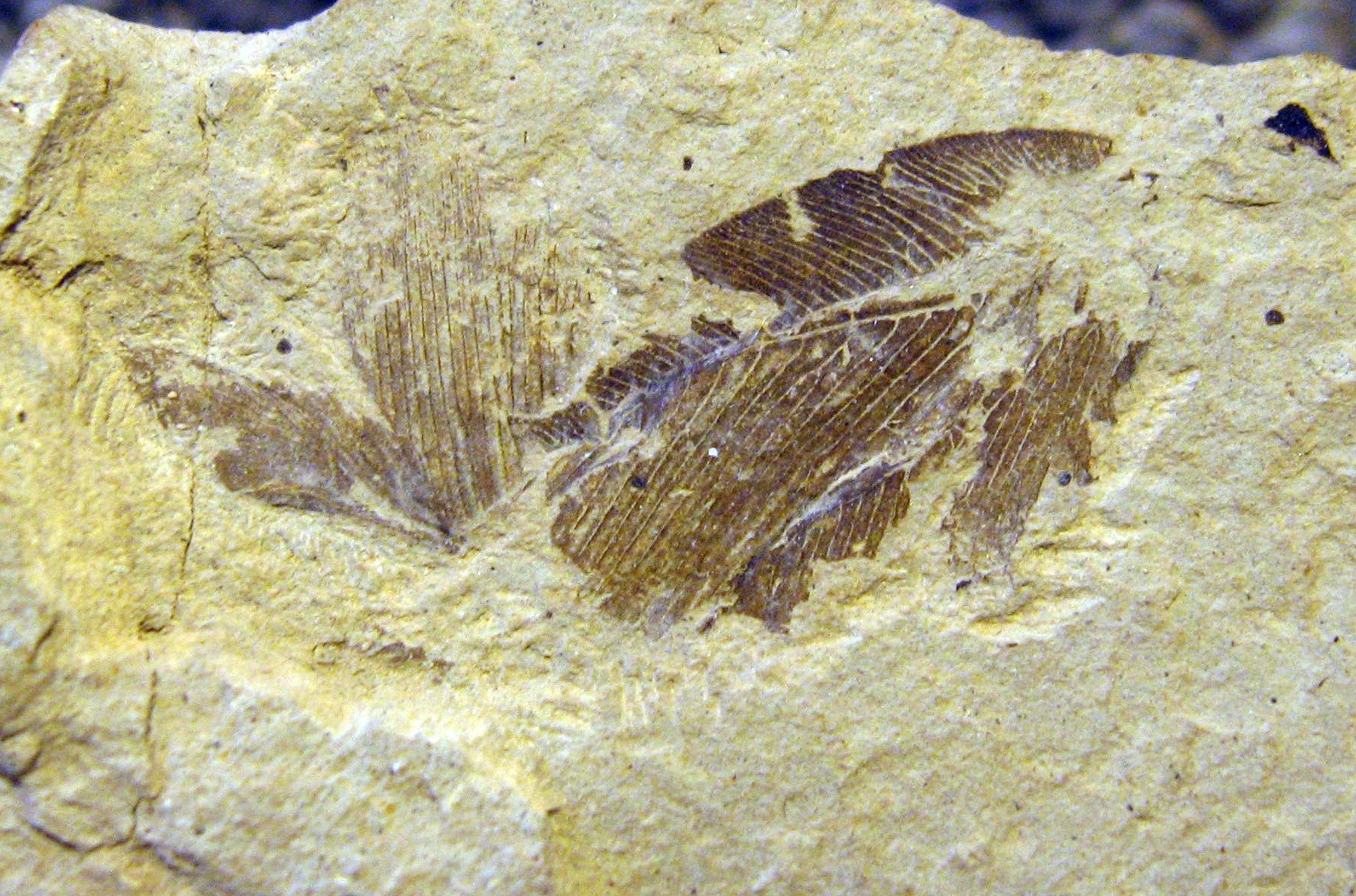
  - Fossilized wing found in Republic; the holotype specimen of the Eocene giant lacewing Polystoechotites barksdalae
    †Polystoechotites barksdalae - type locality for species
  - †Polystoechotites falcatus - type locality for species
  - †Polystoechotites lewisi - type locality for species
- †Proneuronema
  - †Proneuronema wehri - type locality for species
- †Propalosoma – type locality for genus
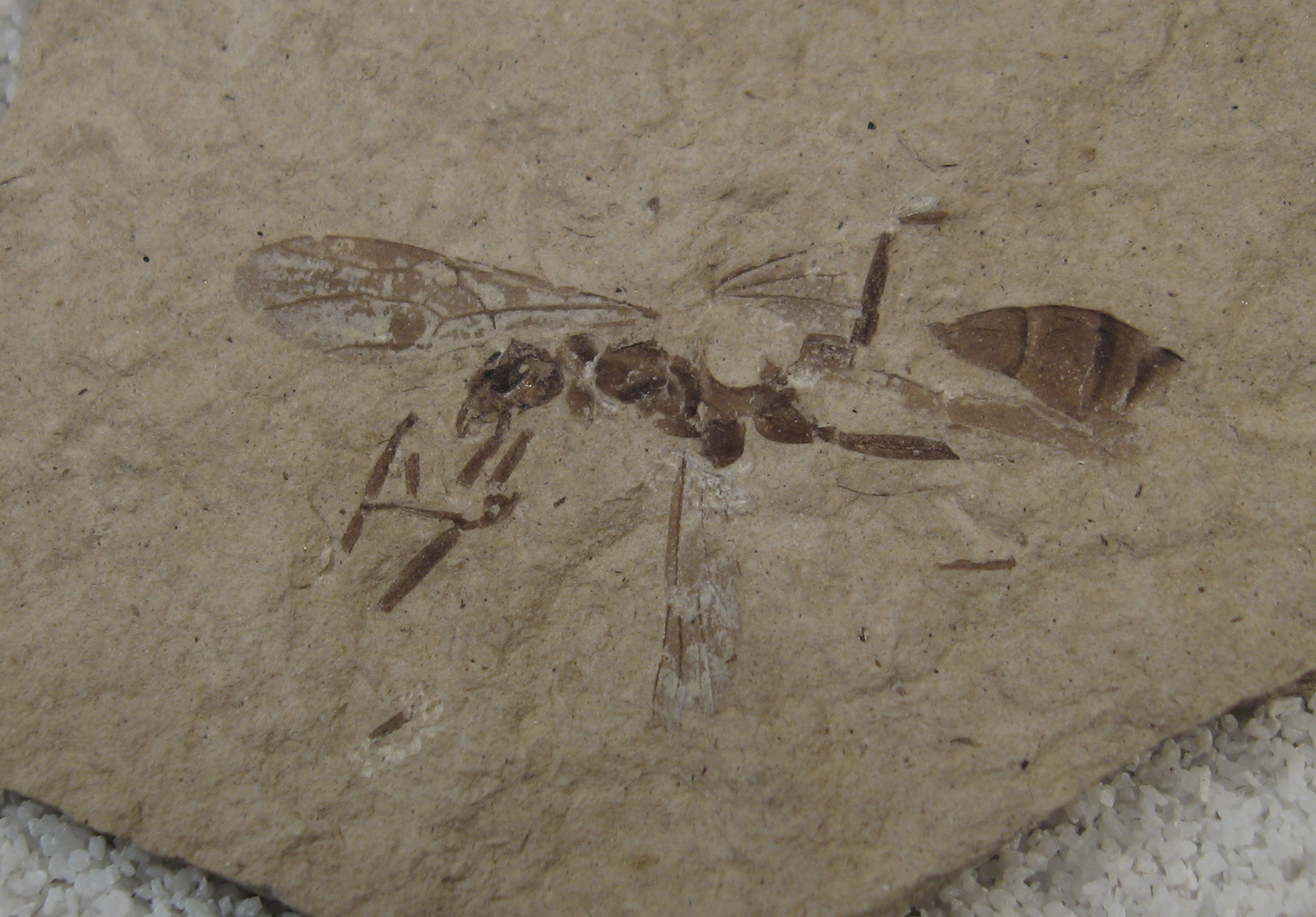
  - Propalosoma gutierrezae holotype queen Ypresian Klondike Mountain Formation Republic
    †Propalosoma gutierrezae - type locality for species
- Proteinus
- Pselaptrichus
- Pseudips
  - Pseudips concinnus (syn=Ips concinnus)
- Pseudohylesinus
  - †Pseudohylesinus nebulosus
  - Cf. †Pseudohylesinus sericeus
- Pseudopsis
  - Aff. †Pseudopsis sulcata
- Pterostichus
  - †Pterostichus adstrictus
  - †Pterostichus castaneus
  - †Pterostichus fernquisti – type locality for species
  - †Pterostichus pumilus
  - †Pterostichus riparius
- Pteryngium
  - †Pteryngium crenatum
- Pycnoglypta
  - †Pycnoglypta campbelli

=== Arthropods Q ===
- Quedius
  - Undescribed Olympia beds Formation subfossils

=== Arthropods R ===
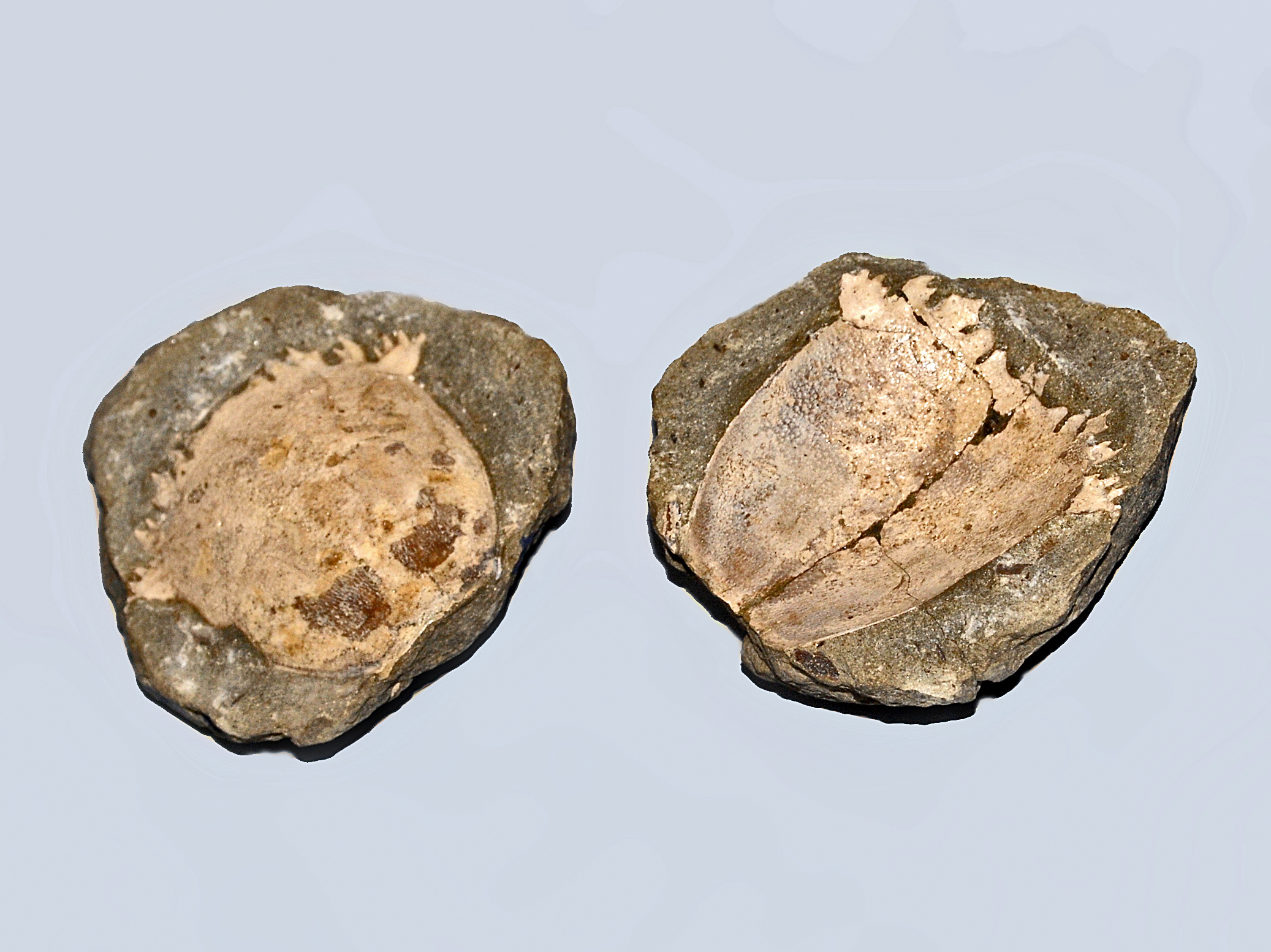
Fossilized carapace of the Paleogene-modern crab Ranina

- Ranina
  - †Ranina americana
- Raninoides
- Reichenbachia
- †Republica - type locality for genus
  - †Republica weatbrooki - type locality for species
- †Republicopteron - type locality for genus
  - †Republicopteron douseae - type locality for species
- Rhantus
- †Rhizocorallium
  - †Rhizocorallium jenense
  - Indeterminate Chuckanut Formation Rhizocorallium insect burrow
- Rhyncolus
- †Rhyncolus brunneus

=== Arthropods S ===
- Saldula
- Scaphinotus
  - †Scaphinotus marginatus
- Sitona
- Sonoma
- †Stenodiafanus - type locality for genus
  - †Stenodiafanus westersidei - type locality for species
- Stenus
- Stephostethus
- Steremnius
  - †Steremnius carinatus
  - †Steremnius tuberosus
- Sthereus
  - †Sthereus multituberculatus
  - †Sthereus quadrituberculatus
- †Swauka - type locality for genus
  - †Swauka ypresiana - type locality for species
- Syntomium
  - Cf. †Syntomium malkini
- Syntomus
  - †Syntomus americanus

=== Arthropods T ===
- Tachinus
  - Tachinus angustatus
  - Tachinus crotchii
  - Tachinus frigidus
  - Cf. Tachinus instabilis
  - Tachinus mimus
  - Tachinus thruppi
- †Taenidium
  - Indeterminate Cuckanut Formation Taenidium type burrows
- Tetrascapha
  - Undescribed Klaloch site subfossils
- Thanatophilus
  - Thanatophilus lapponicus
  - Thanatophilus sagax
- Tipula
  - †Tipula latahensis – type locality for species
- Tournotaris
  - Cf. Tournotaris bimaculata
- Cf. Trechiama
  - Undescribed Klaloch site subfossil similar to Trechiama
- Trechus
  - Trechus (Trechus) chalybeus
  - Trechus (Trechus) oregonensis
  - Cf. Trechus ovipennis
- Trichalophus
  - Trichalophus didymus
- Trichopeltarion
  - †Trichopeltarion berglundorum
- Trypophloeus
  - †Trypophloeus salicis

=== Arthropods U ===
- †Ulmeriella
  - †Ulmeriella latahensis – type locality for species
- †Ulteramus – type locality for genus
  - †Ulteramus republicensis – type locality for species
- Unamis
  - Undescribed Kalaloch Site Pleistocene subfossil
- Upogebia
  - †Upogebia barti - type locality for species
  - †Upogebia eocenica - type locality for species

=== Arthropods W ===
- †Whetwhetaksa - Type locality of the genus
  - †Whetwhetaksa millerae - Type locality of the species

=== Arthropods Y ===
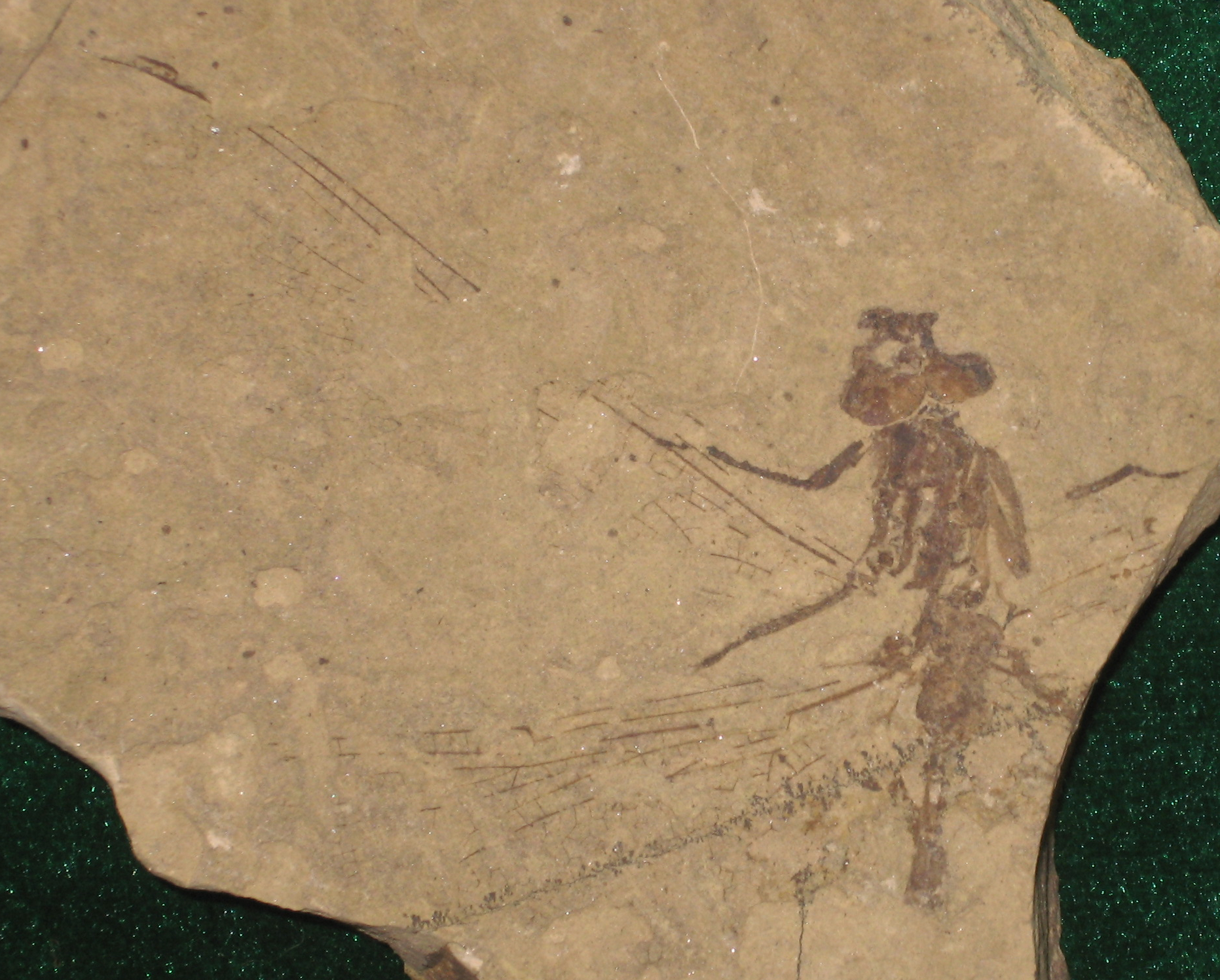
Ypshna brownleei

- †Ypshna
  - †Ypshna brownleei - Type locality of the species

=== Arthropods Z ===
- †Zanthopsis
  - †Zanthopsis vulgaris

== "Fish" ==
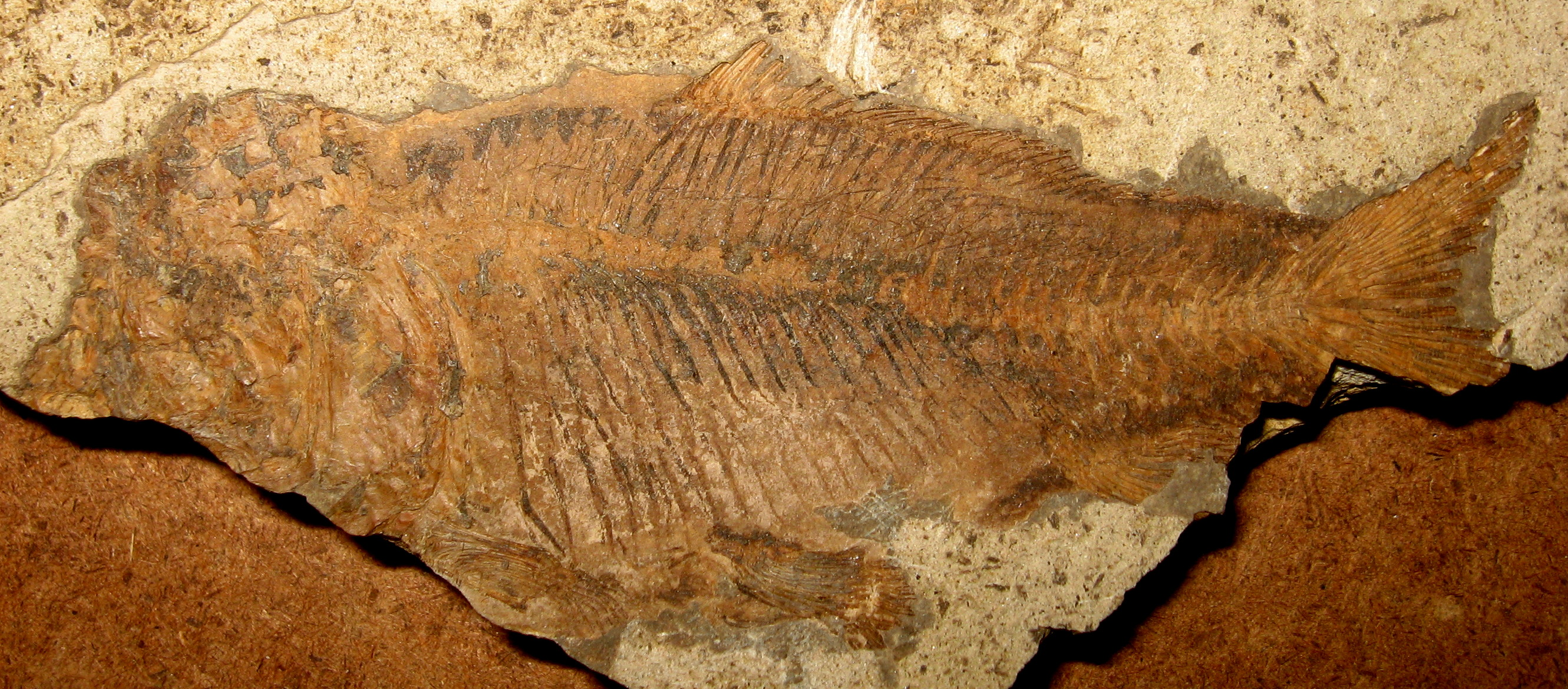
Fossilized skeleton found in Republic belonging to the Eocene-Oligocene sucker fish Amyzon aggregatum

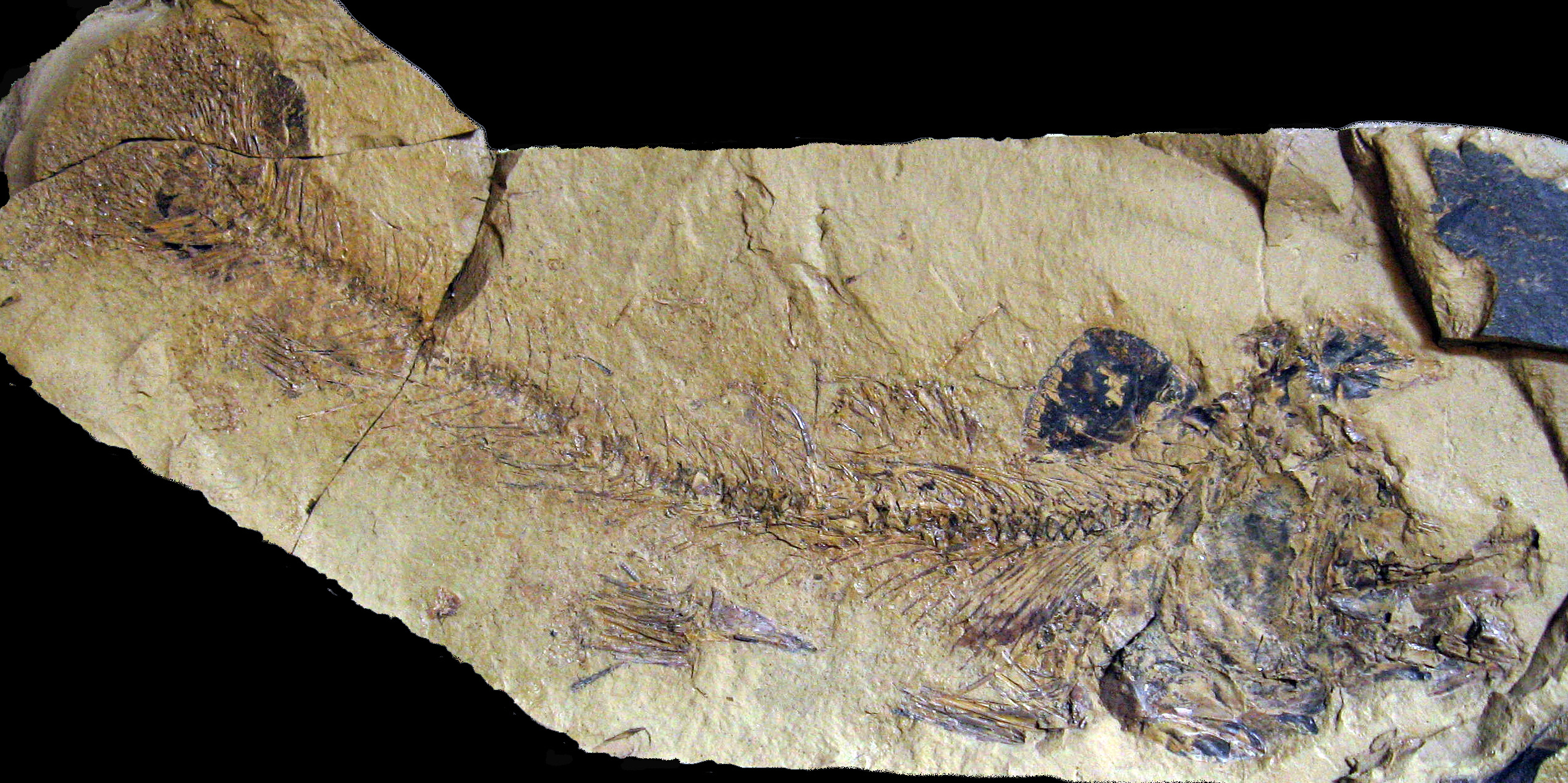
Eosalmo driftwoodensis Klondike Mountain Formation Ypresian Republic

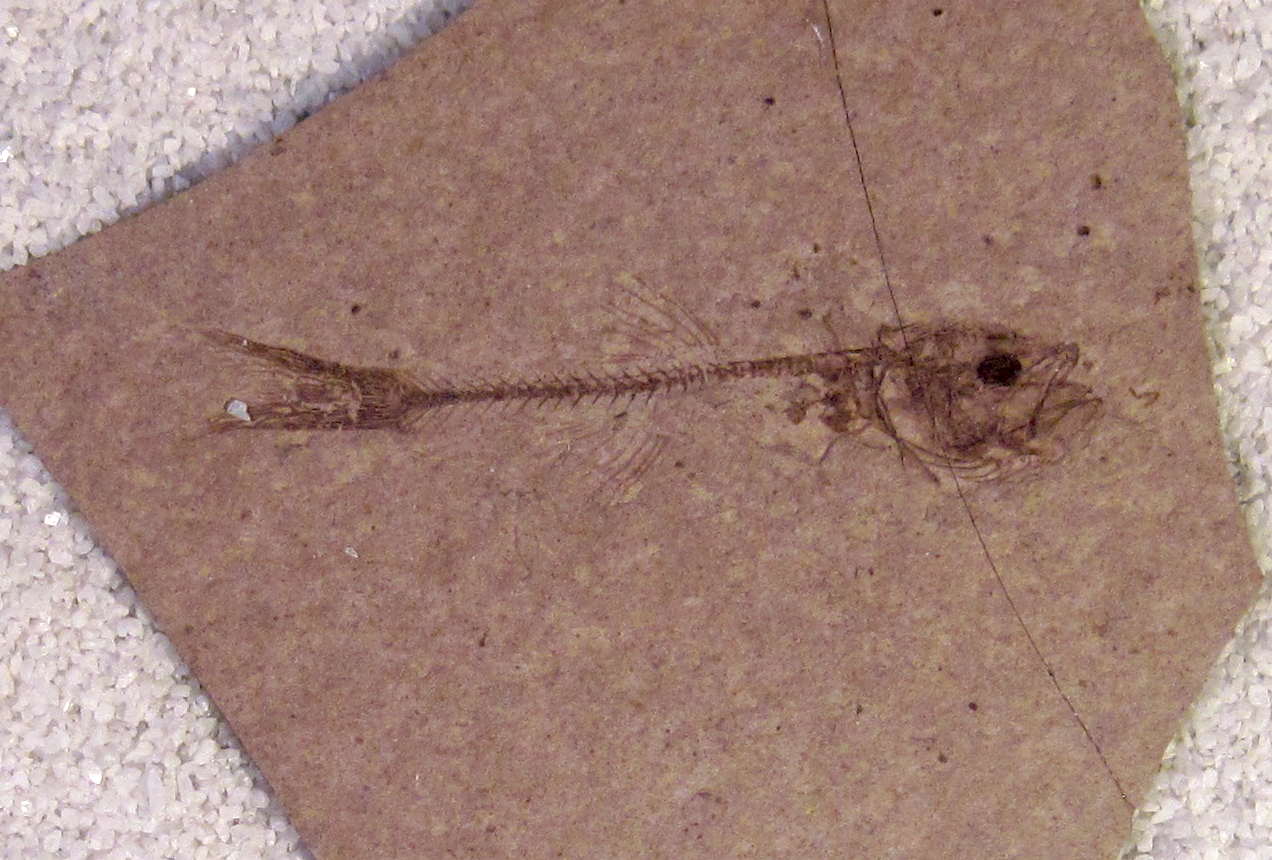
Libotonius pearsoni klondike Mountain Formation Ypresian Republic

- Acipenser
  - Acipenser transmontanus
- Acrocheilus
  - †Acrocheilus latus
- †Aglyptorhynchus
  - †Aglyptorhynchus columbianus – type locality for species
- Alopias
  - Alopias sp.
- Ameiurus
  - †Ameiurus reticulatus – type locality for species
- Amia
  - †"Amia" hesperia
- †Amyzon
  - †Amyzon aggregatum
- Archoplites
  - †Archoplites molarus – type locality for species
- †Brachycarcharias
  - Cf. †Brachycarcharias lerichei
- Catostomus
  - Catostomus macrocheilus
- Chasmistes
  - Cf. †Chasmistes batrachops
- Chlamydoselachus
  - Aff. Chlamydoselachus sp.
- Diaphus?
  - tentatively identified Chattian Lincoln Creek Formation fossil(s)
- †Egertonia
  - Cf. †Egertonia isodonta
- Esox
  - †Esox columbianus – type locality for species
- †Eosalmo
  - †Eosalmo driftwoodensis
- †Gyrace
  - †Gyrace occidentalis (syn=Squalus occidentalis)
- Heptranchias
  - †Heptranchias howelli
- Heterodontus
  - Cf. Heterodontus pineti
- Hiodon
  - †Hiodon woodruffi
- Isistius
  - Cf. Isistius trituratus
- Isurus
  - Tentatively reported Undescribed Ypresian Crescent Formation fossil
- †Jaekelotodus
  - †Jaekelotodus sp.
- Klamathella
  - †Klamathella milleri
- Lavinia
  - †Lavinia hibbardi
- †Libotonius
  - †Libotonius pearsoni - type locality for species
- †Macrorhizodus
  - †Macrorhizodus praecursor
- Mitsukurina
  - Cf. †Mitsukurina maslinensis
  - undescribed middle Eocene Puget Group Tukwila Formation fossil(s)
- Mylocheilus
  - †Mylocheilus heterodon - type locality for species
- Nezumia
  - †Nezumia armentrouti - type locality for species
- Nolorhynchus
- Notorynchus
  - Notorynchus sp.
- Odontaspis
  - Cf. †Odontaspis winkleri
- Oncorhynchus
  - †Oncorhynchus rastrosus
- †Otodus
  - †Otodus (Carcharocles) auriculatus
- †Oxygoniolepidus - type locality for genus
  - †Oxygoniolepidus washingtonensis - type locality for species
- †Palaeohypotodus
  - †Palaeohypotodus sp.
  - Undescribed Ypresian Crescent Formation fossil
- †Phareodus
  - Indeterminate Early Eocene Chuckanut Formation fossil
- †Priscacara
  - †Priscacara campi – type locality for species
- †Probathygadus - type locality for genus
  - †Probathygadus keaseyensis - type locality for species
- Ptychocheilus
  - †Ptychocheilus arciferus
- †Rhinoscymnus
  - †Rhinoscymnus viridadama - type locality for species
- Somniosus
  - †Somniosus gonzalezi - type locality for species
- †Striatolamia
  - †Striatolamia macrota
- †Triaenodon
  - undescribed middle Eocene Puget Group Tukwila Formation fossil(s)
- †Vaillantoonia
  - †Vaillantoonia sp.

== Birds ==
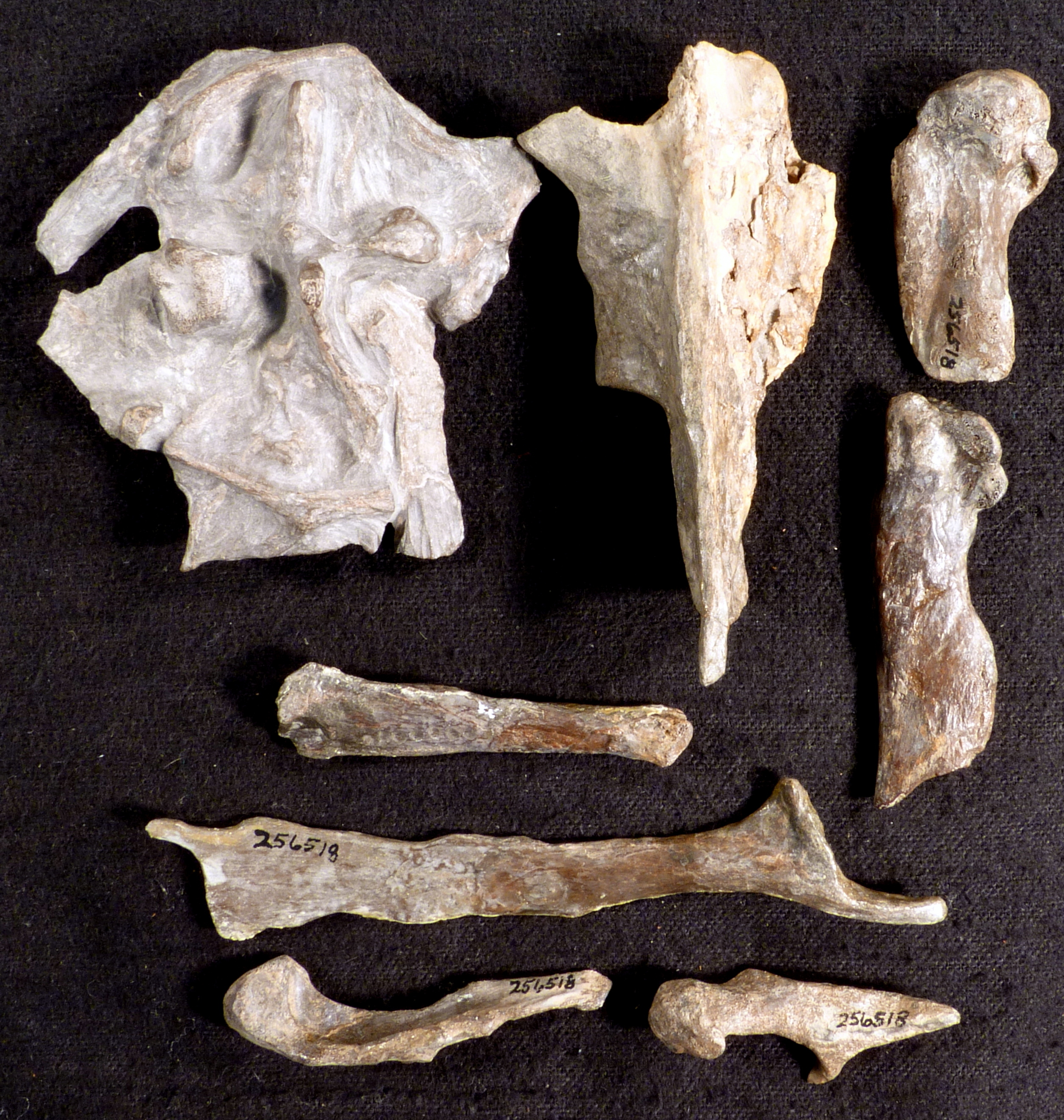
Tonsala hildegardae Pysht Formation, Oligocene

- †Ardeipeda
  - Indeterminate Chuckanut Formation Gruipedidae wading bird tracks
- †Avipeda
  - Indeterminate Chuckanut Formation Avipedidae wading bird tracks
- †Charadriipeda
  - Indeterminate Chuckanut Formation webbed bird tracks
- †Diomedavus - type locality for genus
  - †Diomedavus knapptonensis - type locality for species
- †Fucadytes - type locality for genus
  - ↑Fucadytes discrepans - type locality for species
- †Klallamornis - type locality for genus
  - †Klallamornis abyssa - type locality for species
  - †Klallamornis buchanani (syn=Tonsala buchanani) – type locality for species
  - †Klallamornis clarki - type locality for species
- †Makahala - type locality for genus
  - †Makahala mirae - type locality for species
- †Ornithoformipes - type locality for genus
  - †Ornithoformipes controversus - type locality for species
- †Olympidytes - type locality for genus
  - †Olympidytes thieli - type locality for species
- †Rivavipes - type locality for genus
  - †Rivavipes giganteus - type locality for species
- †Tonsala – type locality for genus
  - †Tonsala hildegardae – type locality for species

== Reptiles ==
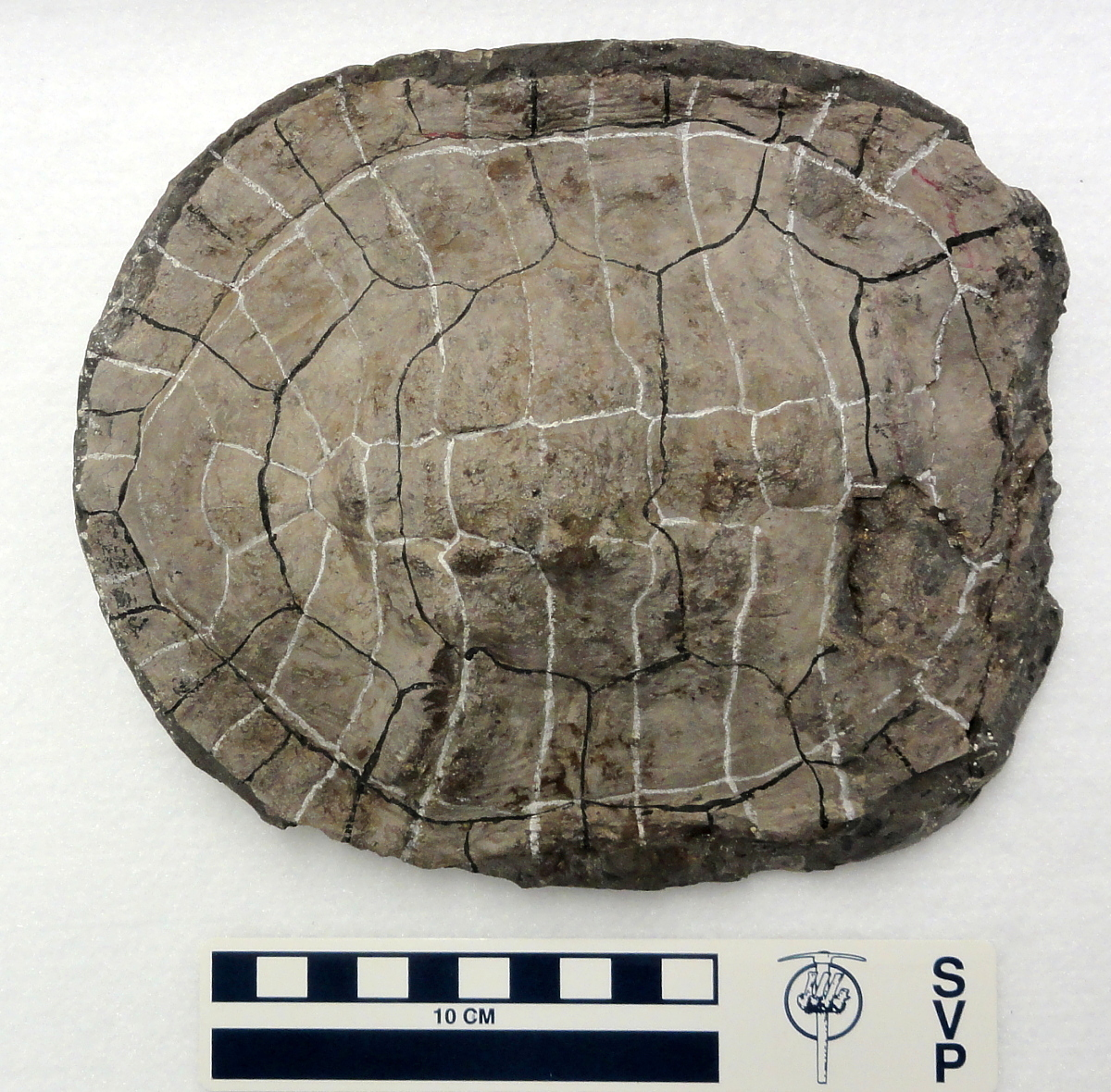
Acherontemys heckmani holotype

- †Acherontemys – type locality for genus
  - †Acherontemys heckmani – type locality for species
- †Anticusuchipes
  - †Anticusuchipes amnis - type locality for species
- Charina
  - Charina bottae
- †Chelonipus
  - Indeterminate Chuckanut Formation turtle tracks
- Crotalus
  - Indeterminate Blancan Ringold Formation "Taunton fauna" subfossil(s)
- Elaphe
  - †Elaphe pliocenica
- Lampropeltis
  - Lampropeltis getulus
- Pantherophis
  - Pantherophis vulpinus (syn=Elaphe vulpina)
- Phrynosoma
  - Cf. Phrynosoma douglasii
- Pituophis
  - Pituophis catenifer

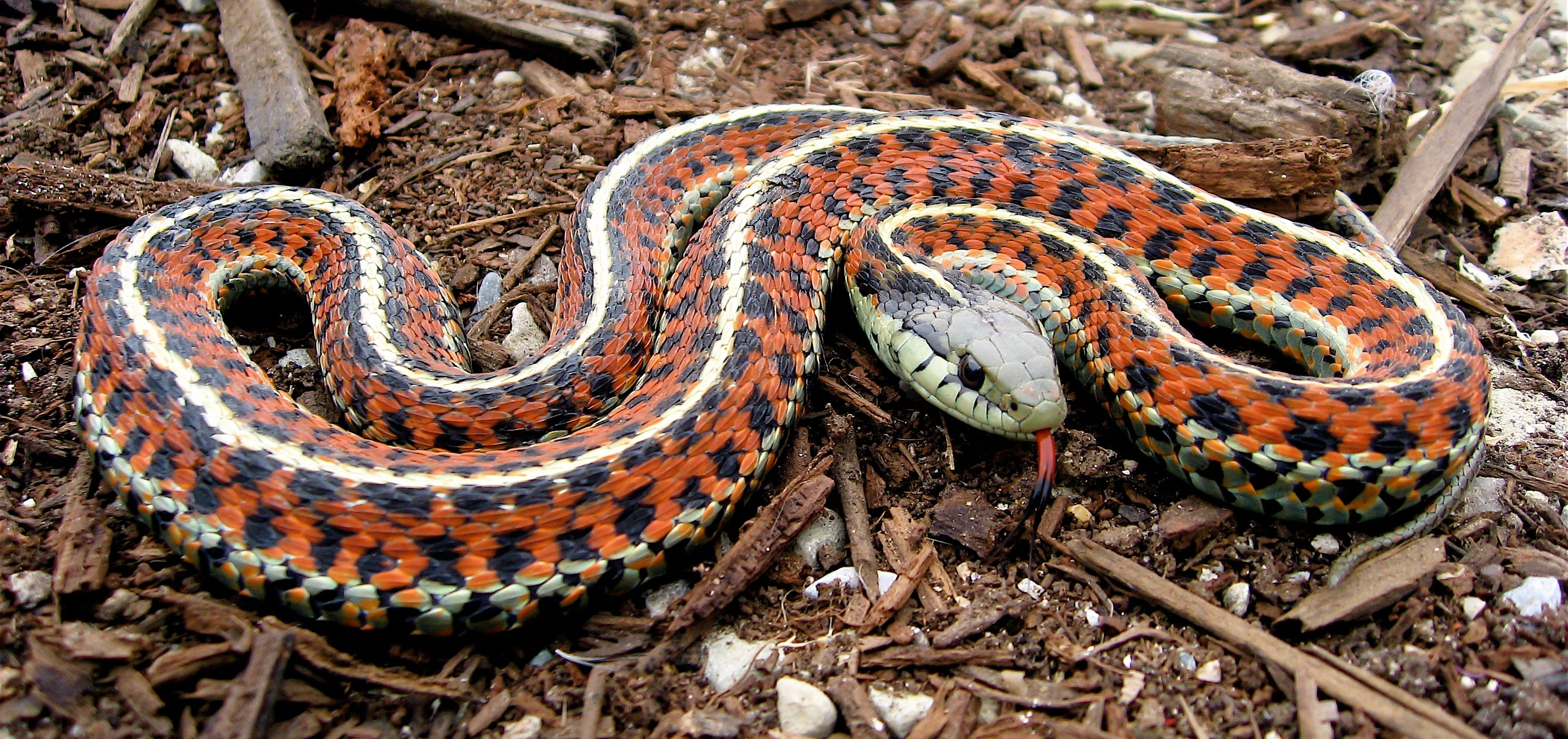
A living Thamnophis, or garter snake

- †Tauntonophis – type locality for genus
  - †Tauntonophis morganorum – type locality for species
- Thamnophis
  - Undescribed Pliocene Ringold Formation "Taunton fauna" subfossil(s)
- Trionyx
  - Indeterminate Early Eocene Chuckanut Formation fossil
- †Wilburemys – type locality for genus
  - †Wilburemys yakimensis – type locality for species

== Mammals ==
=== Mammals A ===
- †Alilepus
  - †Alilepus vagus
  - Cf. †Alilepus wilsoni
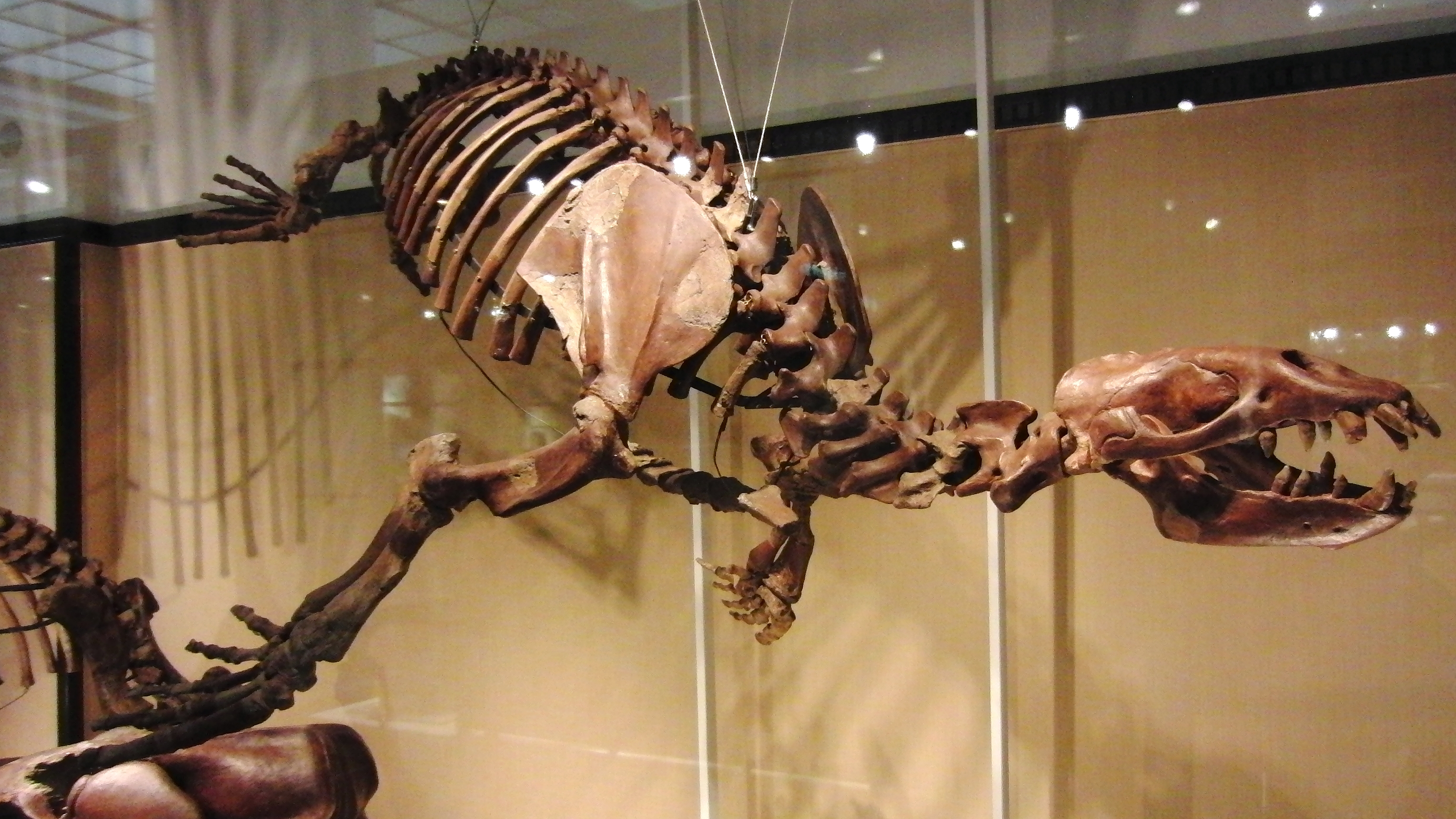
- Fossilized skeleton of the Miocene seal Allodesmus
  †Allodesmus
  - †Allodesmus demerei - type locality for species
  - undescribed Oligocene Pysht Formation fossils of possible Allodesmus affinity.
- Ammospermophilus
  - †Ammospermophilus hanfordi
- Cf. Antecalomys
  - Indeterminate Wilbur site fossils
- †Aphelops
  - Cf. †Aphelops mutilus

=== Mammals B ===
- Bassariscus
  - Cf. †Bassariscus casei
- †Behemotops – type locality for genus
  - †Behemotops proteus – type locality for species
- Bison
  - Bison antiquus
  - Undescribed Late Pleistocene Manis Mastodon site subfossil
- †Borealodon – type locality for genus
  - †Borealodon osedax – type locality for species
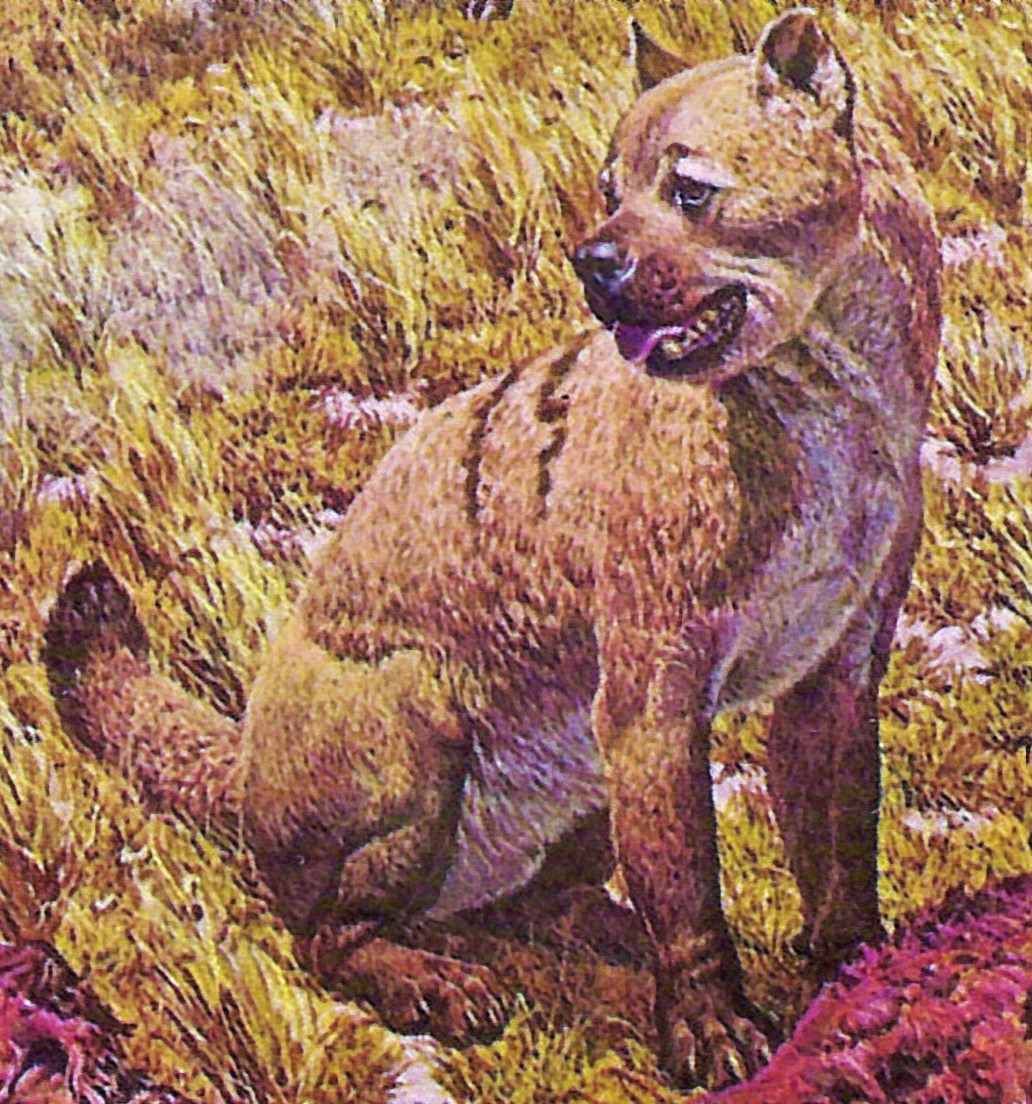
- Restoration of two of the Miocene-Pliocene bone-crushing dog genus Borophagus preying on a camel. Jay Matternes (1964).
  †Borophagus
  - †Borophagus diversidens
  - †Borophagus hilli
- †Bretzia
  - †Bretzia pseudalces – type locality for species
  - undescribed Early Pliocene Ellensburg Formation fossil(s)
- †Buisnictis
  - †Buisnictis breviramus

=== Mammals C ===
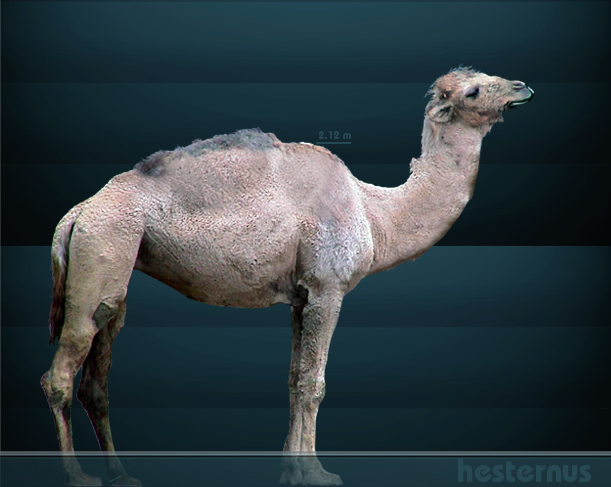
- Life restoration of the Pliocene-Holocene camel Camelops
  †Camelops
  - Indeterminate Irvingtonian Delight site, Adams County subfossil
  - Indeterminate Blancan Ringold Formation fossil
- Canis
  - †Canis lepophagus
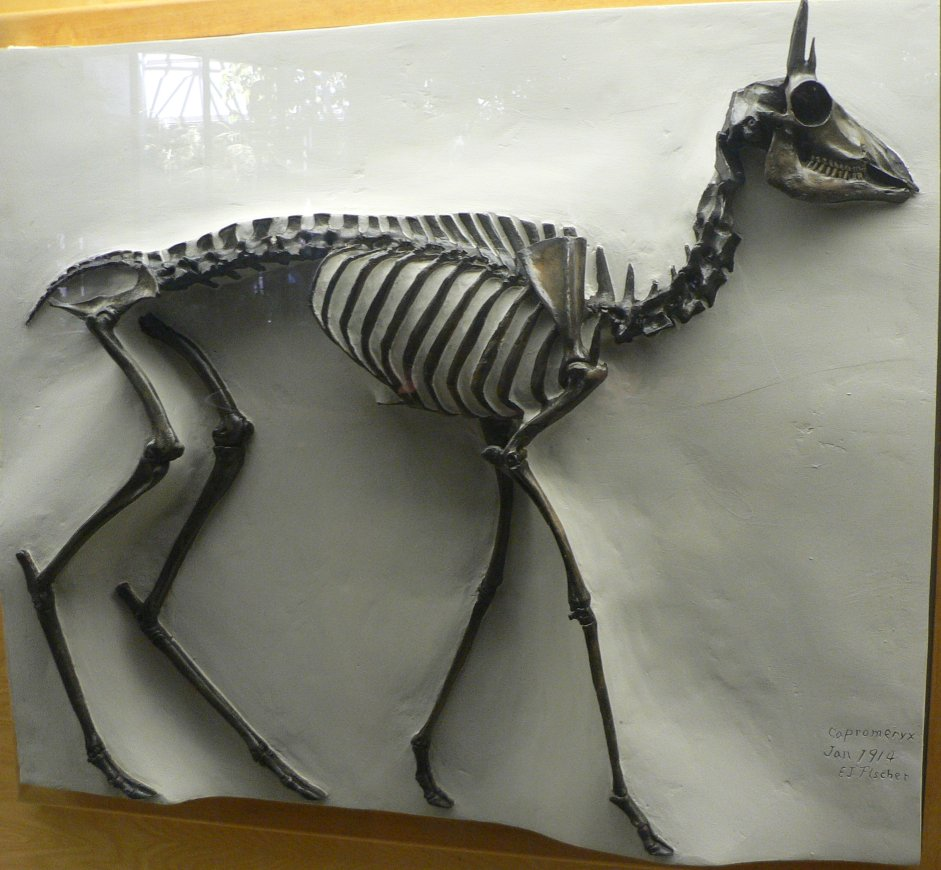
- Panel-Fossilized skeleton of the Pleistocene dwarf pronghorn Capromeryx
  †Capromeryx
  - †Capromeryx tauntonensis – type locality for species
- Castor
  - †Castor californicus
  - Indeterminate Wilbur Site fossils
- Cervus
  - †Cervus brevitrabalis
- †Copemys
  - Indeterminate Wilbur Site fossils
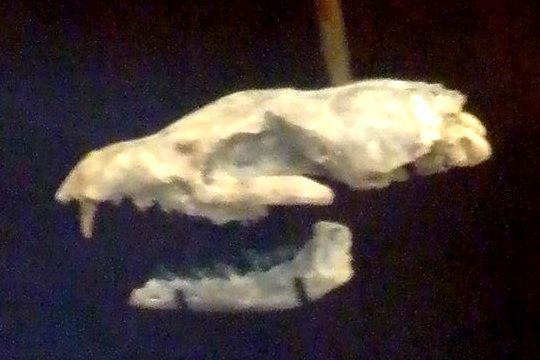
- Fossilized skull of the Oligocene-Miocene bone-crushing dog Cormocyon
  †Cormocyon
  - †Cormocyon copei
- †Cosoryx
  - †Cosoryx (Subcosoryx) cerroensis
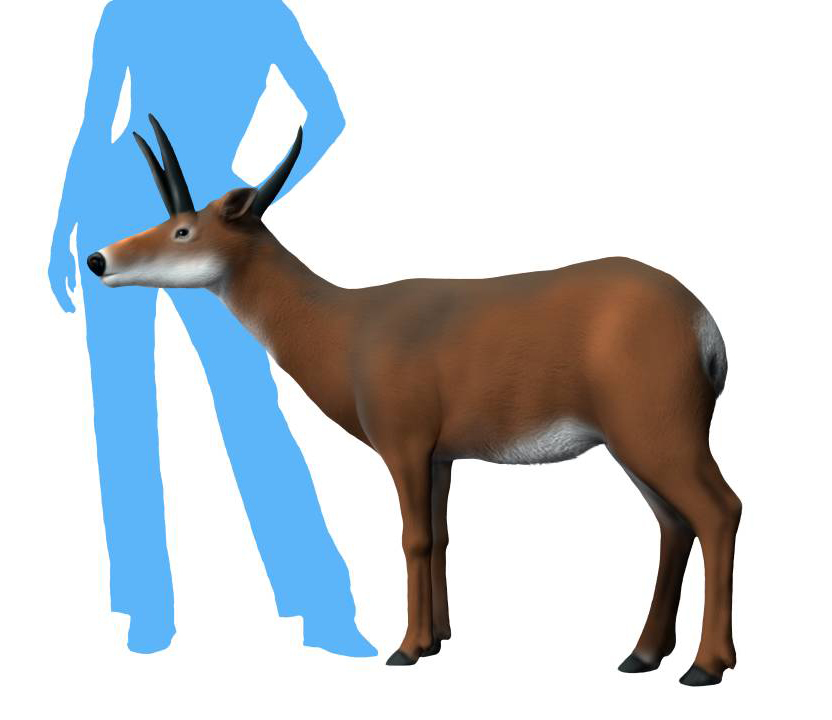
- Restoration of the Miocene palaeomerycid Cranioceras, a relative of modern deer, with anachronistic human to scale
  †Cranioceras
  - Cf. †Cranioceras unicornis
- †Cynarctus
  - †Cynarctus crucidens

=== Mammals D ===
- †Desmatophoca
  - †Desmatophoca brachycephala – type locality for species
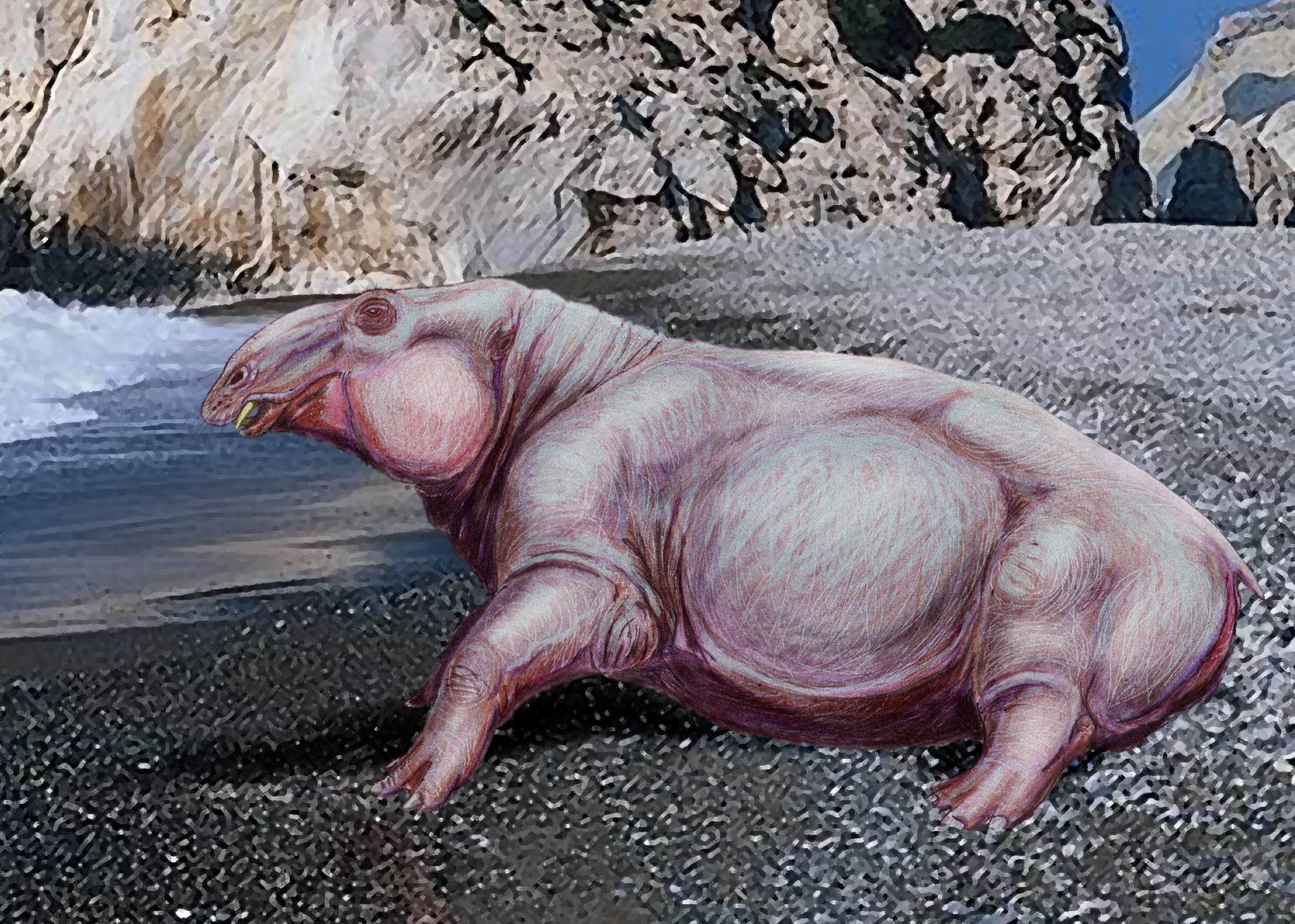
- Life restoration of the Oligocene-Miocene herbivorous marine mammal Desmostylus
  †Desmostylus
  - †Desmostylus hesperus
- †Diceratherium
  - †Diceratherium annectens
  - "Blue lake rhino" - unidentified species preserved as a cast in basalt
- †Dinofelis
  - Cf. †Dinofelis palaeoonca
- †Dipoides
  - †Dipoides rexroadensis
  - †Dipoides wilsoni

=== Mammals E ===
- †Enhydrocyon
  - Undescribed Monroecreekian Wildcat Creek beds fossil
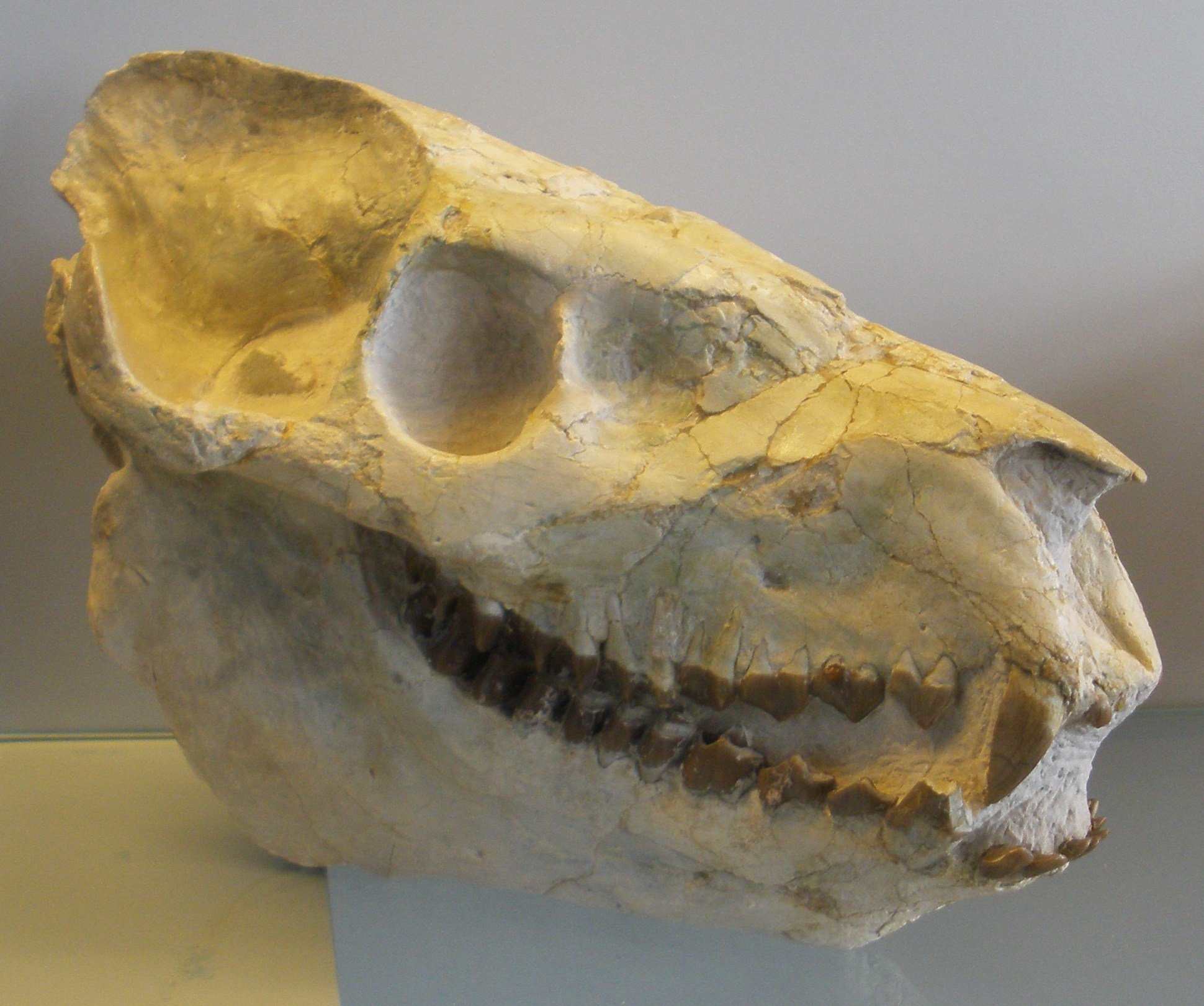
- Fossilized skull of the Oligocene-Miocene oreodont mammal Eporeodon
  †Eporeodon
  - Undescribed Monroecreekian Wildcat Creek beds fossil
- Equus
  - †Equus simplicidens
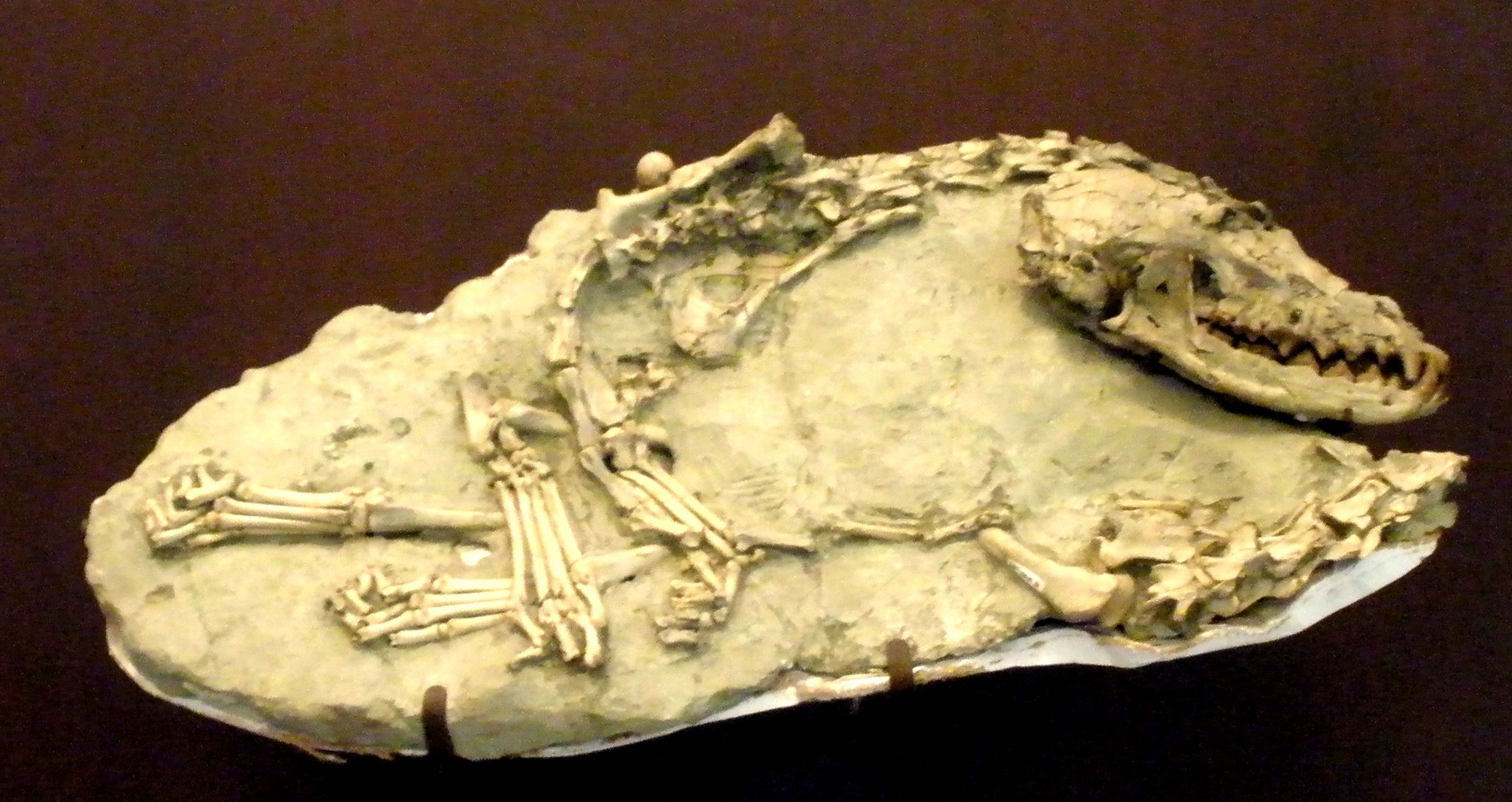
- Fossilized skeleton of the Miocene-Pliocene coyote-like canine Eucyon
  †Eucyon
  - †Eucyon davisi

=== Mammals F ===
- †Fucaia – type locality for genus
  - †Fucaia buelli – type locality for species
  - †Fucaia goedertorum – type locality for species
  - †Fucaia humilis – type locality for species

=== Mammals H ===
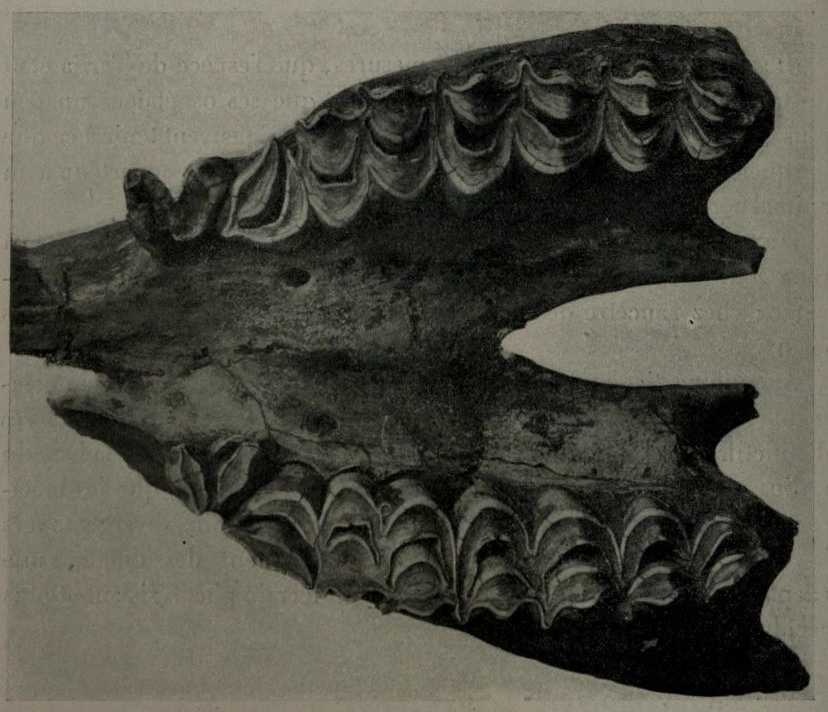
Fossilized lower jaw of the Miocene-Pleistocene llama relative Hemiauchenia

- †Hemiauchenia
  - Cf. †Hemiauchenia macrocephala
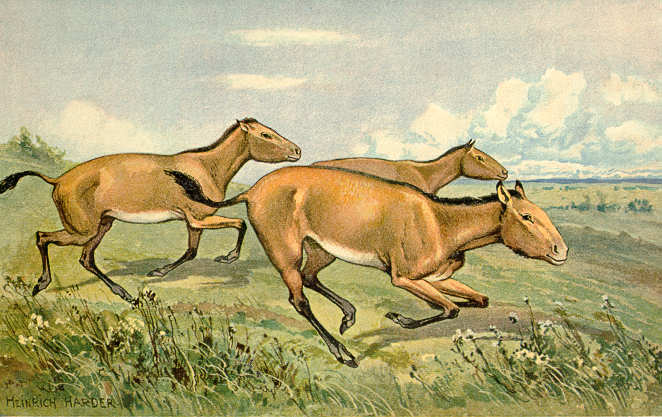
- Life restoration of a herd of the Miocene-Pleistocene horse Hipparion. Heinrich Harder (1920).
  †Hipparion
  - †Hipparion condoni
- †Hoplictis
  - †Hoplictis grangerensis
- †Hypertragulus
  - Undescribed Monroecreekian Wildcat Creek beds fossil
- †Hypolagus
  - †Hypolagus edensis
  - †Hypolagus furlongi
  - †Hypolagus gidleyi
  - †Hypolagus ringoldensis – type locality for species
  - Cf. †Hypolagus vetus

=== Mammals K ===
- †Kolponomos
  - †Kolponomos clallamensis
- Aff. †Kronokotherium
  - Undescribed Miocene Clallam Formation fossil.
  - Undescribed Late Eocene Pysht Formation fossil.

=== Mammals L ===
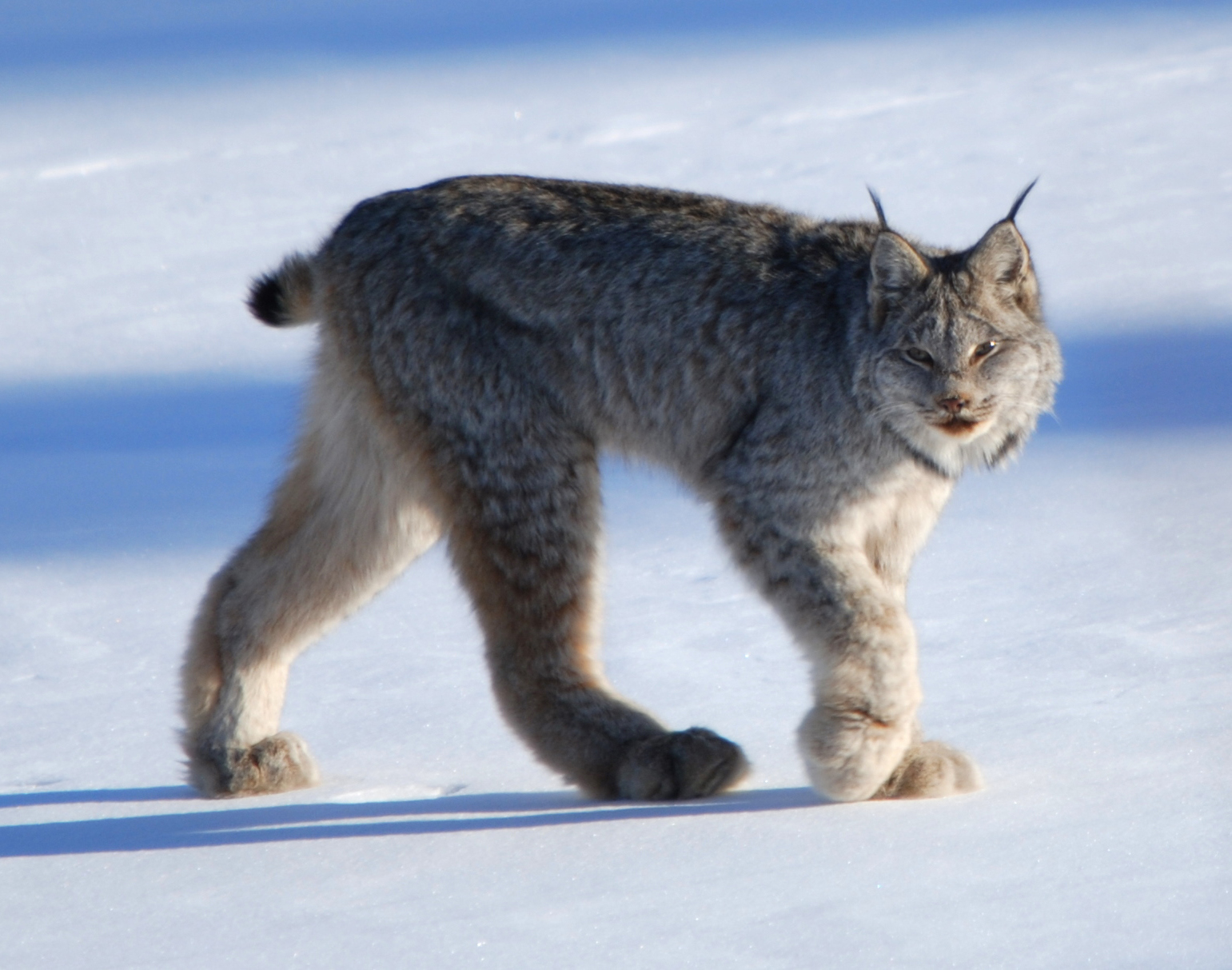
A living Lynx

- †Leptarctus
  - Undescribed Clarendonian Ellensburg Formation fossil
- Lynx
  - Lynx canadensis
  - Cf. Lynx rufus

=== Mammals M ===
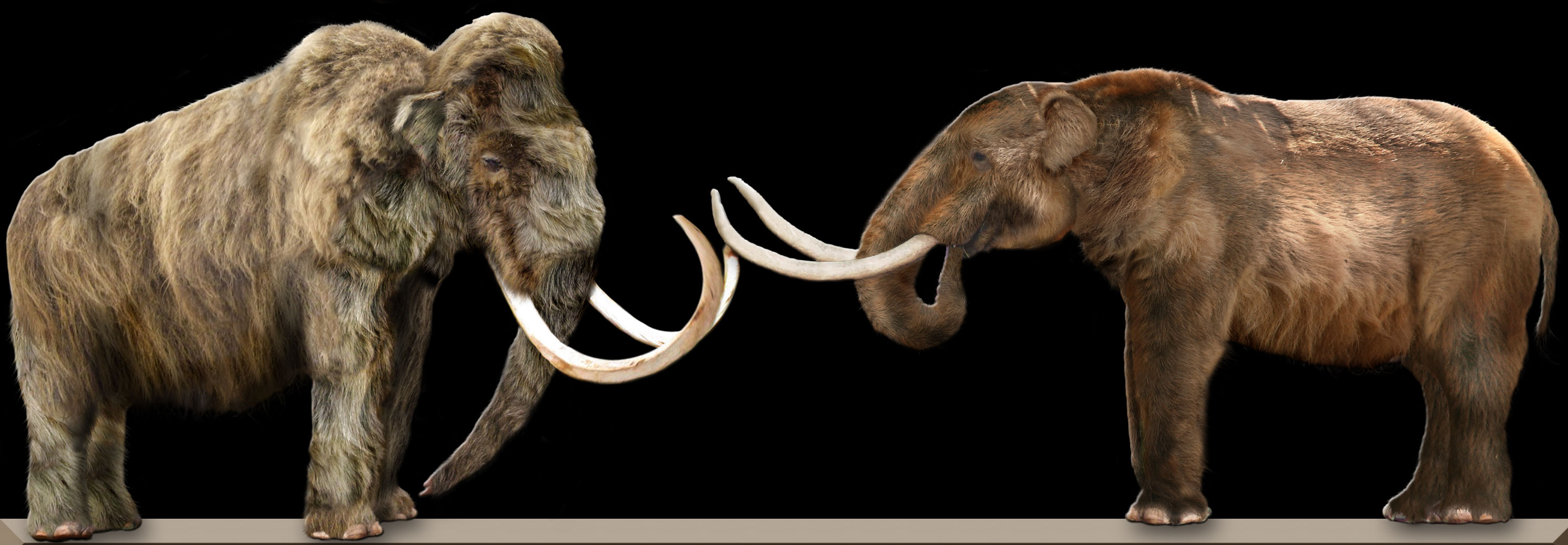
Life restorations of a Mammut americanum, or American mastodon (right), and a Mammuthus primigenius, or wooly mammoth (left)

- †Mammut
  - †Mammut americanum
- †Mammuthus
  - †Mammuthus columbi
  - †Mammuthus primigenius
- †Megalonyx
  - †Megalonyx leptostomus
- †Megatylopus
  - Cf. †Megatylopus cochrani
  - Indeterminate Wilbur site fossils
- †Merycoides
- †Mesoreodon
- †Mimomys
  - †Mimomys mcknighti
  - †Mimomys taylori
- †Miohippus
  - Cf. †Miohippus equiceps
  - †Miohippus equinanus? – tentative report
- Mirounga
  - Mirounga angustirostris.
- Mustela
  - Cf. †Mustela rexroadensis

=== Mammals N ===
- †Nekrolagus
  - Cf. †Nekrolagus progressus
- Neotamias
  - Cf. Neotamias malloryi
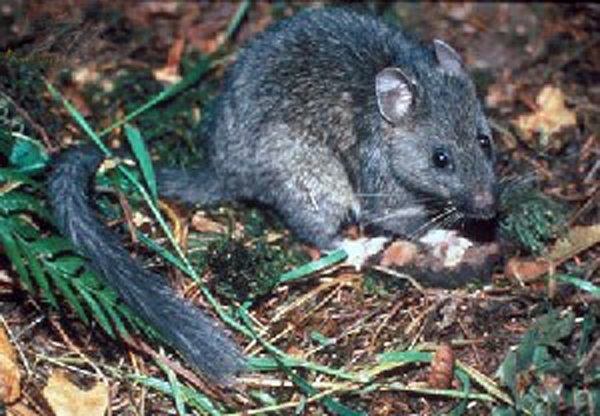
- A living Neotoma, or pack rat
  Neotoma
  - Cf. †Neotoma fossilis
  - Cf. †Neotoma quadriplicata

=== Mammals O ===
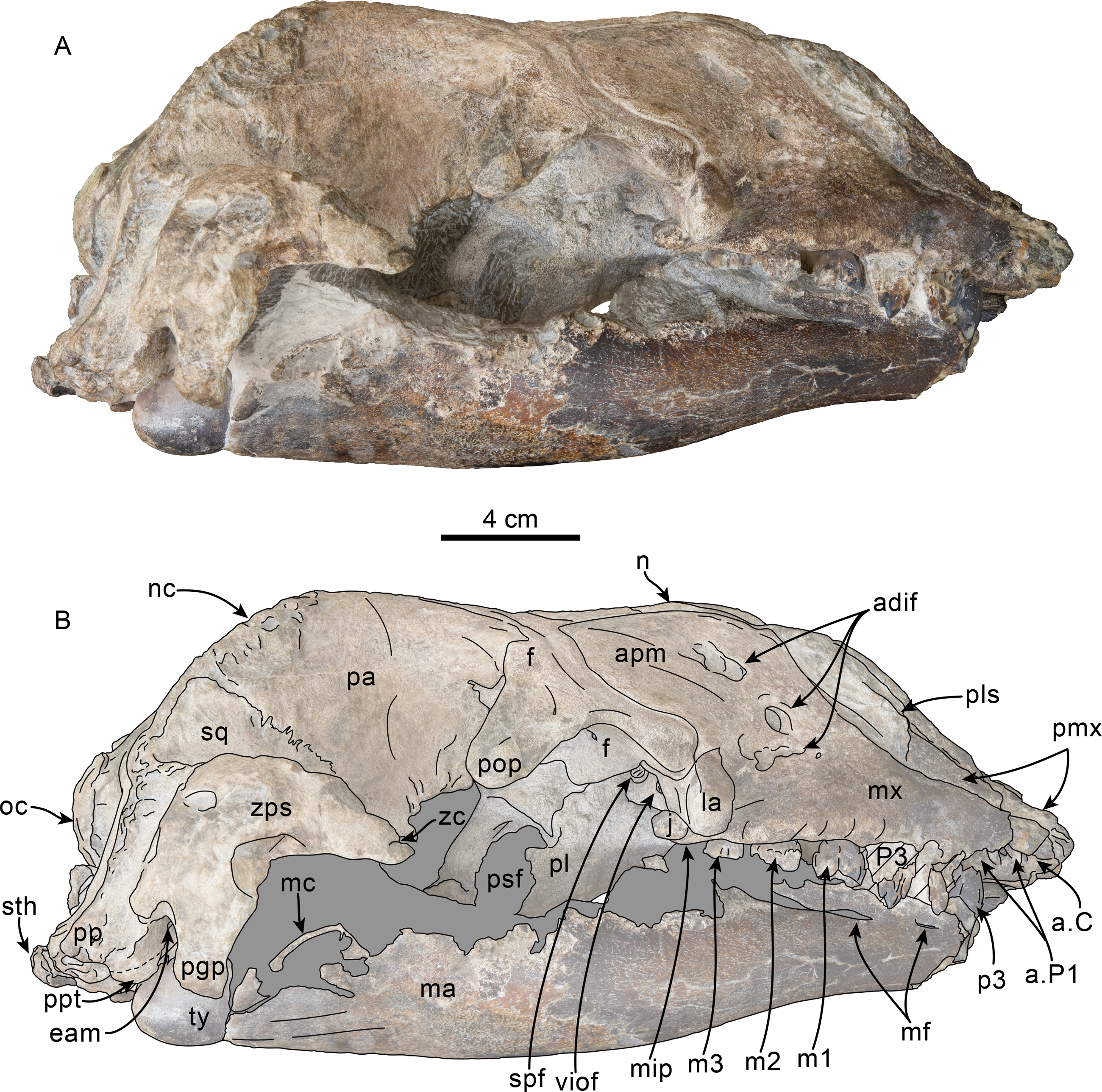
Olympicetus thalassodon

- Odocoileus
  - Odocoileus hemionus
- †Olympicetus - type locality for genus
  - †Olympicetus avitus - type locality for species
  - †Olympicetus thalassodon - type locality for species
- Ondatra
  - †Ondatra minor

=== Mammals P ===
- †Paenemarmota
  - Cf. †Paenemarmota sawrockensis
- Cf. †Palaeolagus
- †Paracryptotis
  - †Paracryptotis rex
- †Paraenhydrocyon
  - †Paraenhydrocyon josephi
- †Parailurus
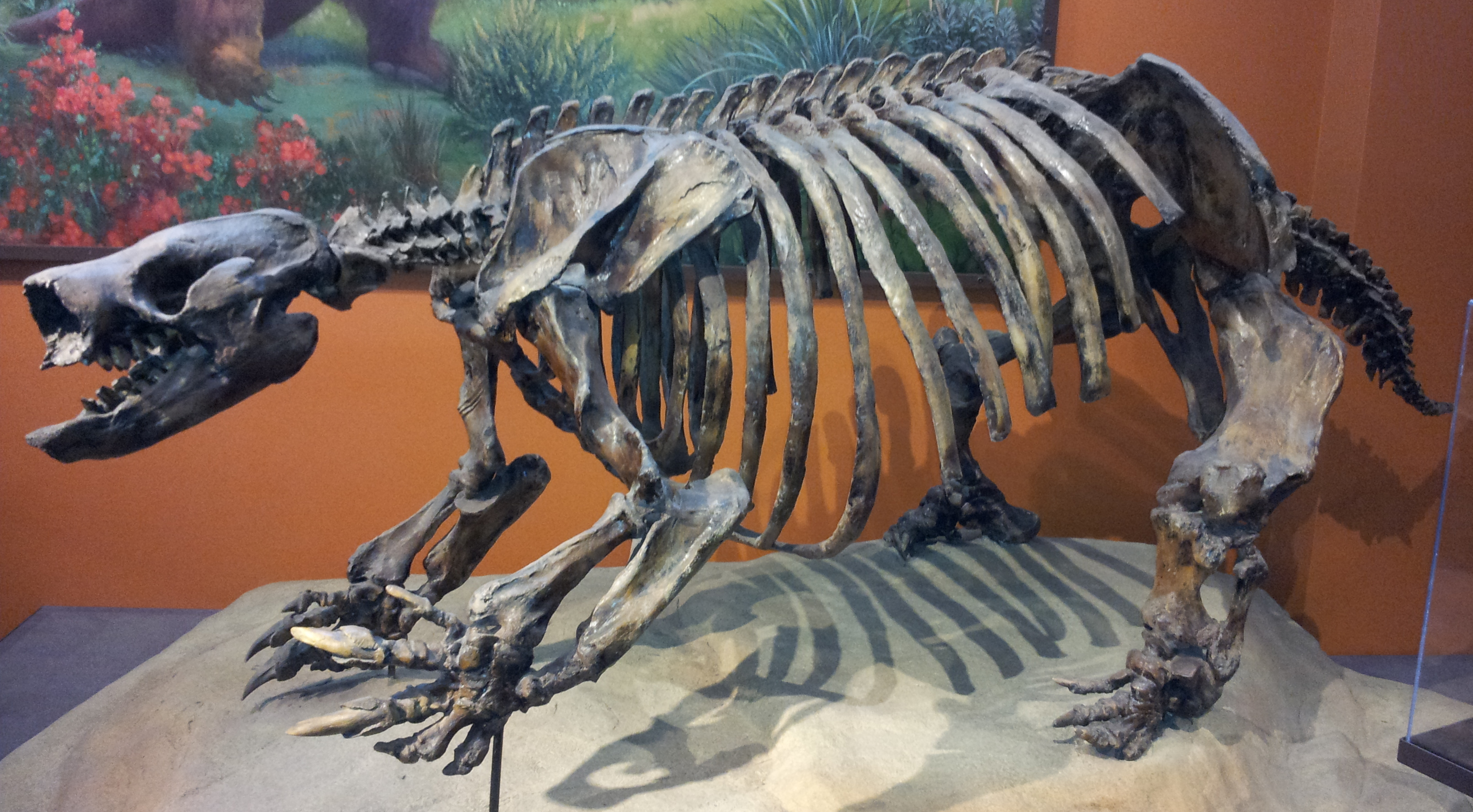
- Fossilized skeleton of the Pliocene-Pleistocene ground sloth Paramylodon
  †Paramylodon
  - †Paramylodon harlani
- †Paronychomys
  - Cf. †Paronychomys woodburnei
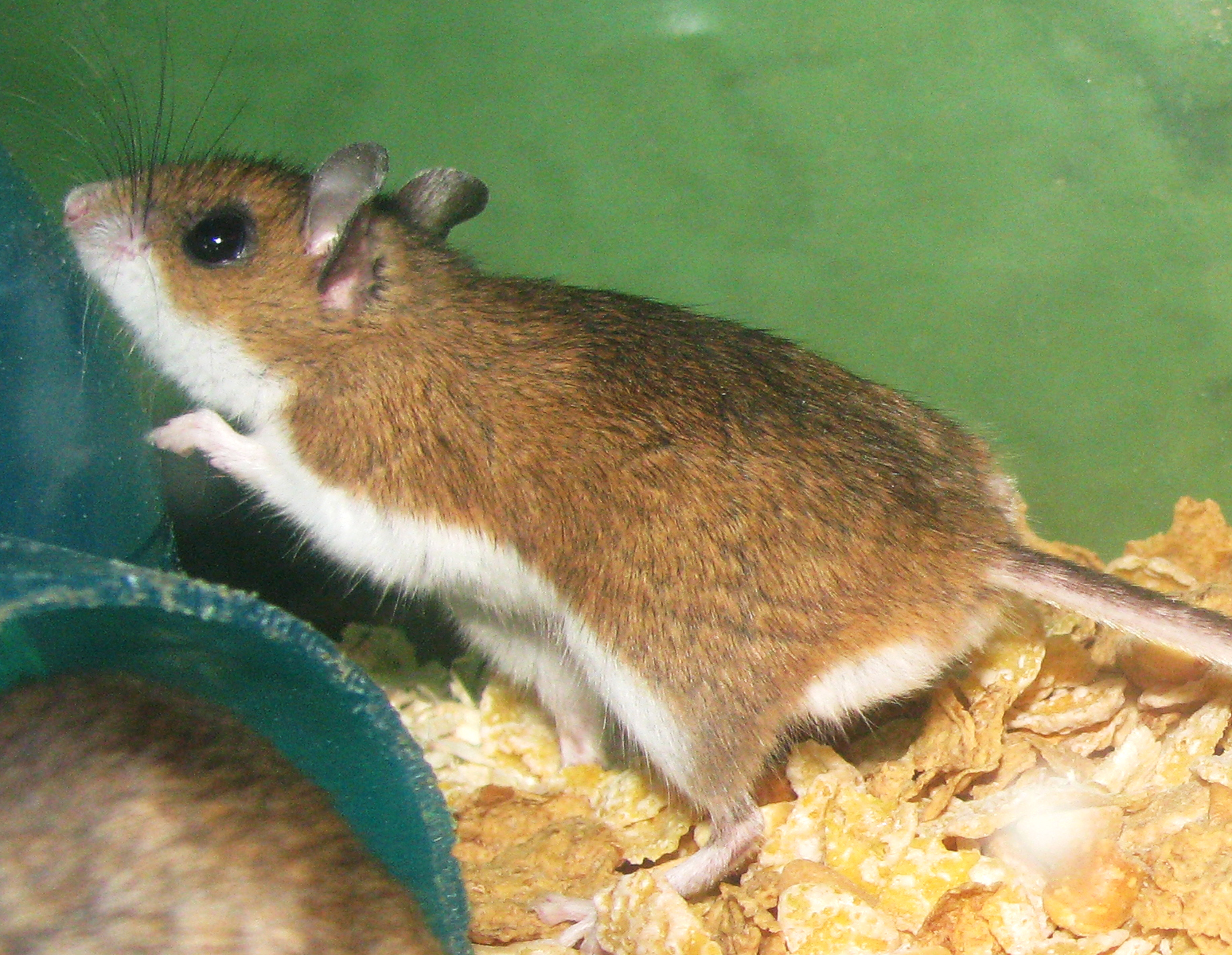
- A living Peromyscus, or deer mouse
  Peromyscus
  - †Peromyscus nosher
- Perognathus
  - Indeterminate Wilbur site fossil
- Phenacomys
  - Phenacomys intermedius
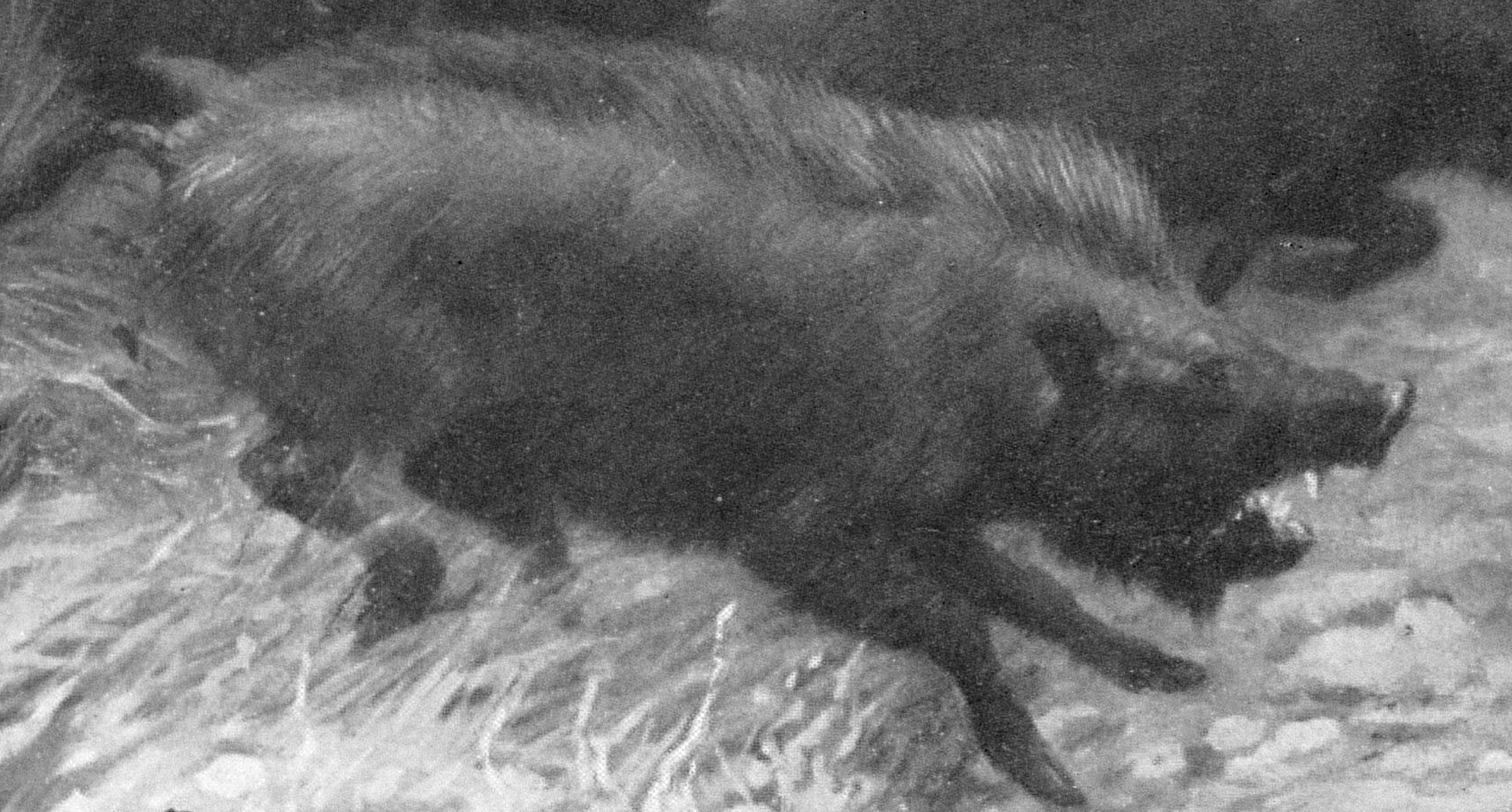
- Restoration of a herd of alarmed Miocene-Pleistocene peccaries of the genus Platygonus. Charles R. Knight (1922).
  †Platygonus
  - †Platygonus pearcei
- †Plionarctos
  - †Plionarctos harroldorum – type locality for species
- †Pliosaccomys
  - †Pliosaccomys prowitteorum - type locality for species
- †Pliotaxidea
  - †Pliotaxidea nevadensis
- †Procastoroides
  - Cf. †Procastoroides idahoensis
- Procyon – tentative report
- †Prodipodomys
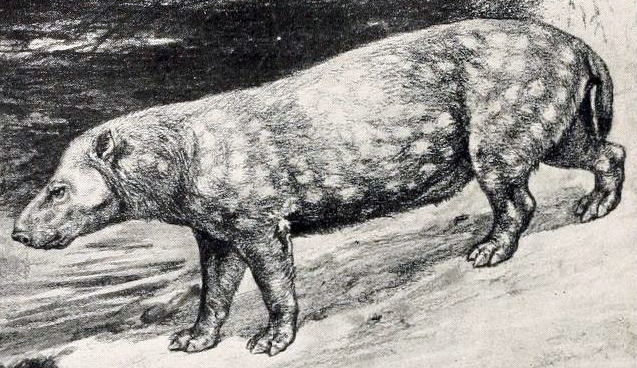
- Life restoration of the Miocene oreodont Promerycochoerus. Robert Bruce Horsfall (1913).
  †Promerycochoerus
  - †Promerycochoerus superbus
- †Prosthennops
- Pterynotus
  - †Pterynotus washingtonicus – type locality for species
- Puma
  - Puma concolor? – tentative report
  - †Puma lacustris (syn=Felis lacustris)

=== Mammals R ===
- Rangifer

=== Mammals S ===
- †Salishicetus - type locality for genus
  - †Salishicetus meadi - type locality for species
- †Satherium
  - †Satherium piscinarium
- Scapanus
- †Sitsqwayk
  - †Sitsqwayk cornishorum – type locality for species
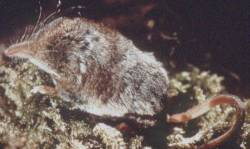
- A living Sorex, or long-tailed shrew
  Sorex
  - Cf. †Sorex meltoni
  - †Sorex powersi
- Spermophilus
  - Cf. †Spermophilus howelli
  - †Spermophilus russelli
  - †Spermophilus wilsoni
- Spilogale
- †Squaloziphius – type locality for genus
  - †Squaloziphius emlongi – type locality for species

=== Mammals T ===
- Taxidea
  - Taxidea taxus - subfossil
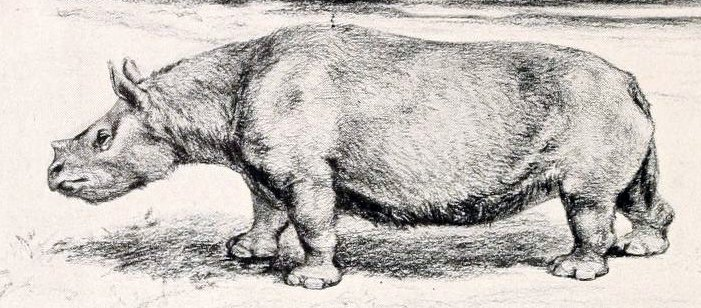
- Restoration of the Miocene-Pliocene rhinoceros Teleoceras
  †Teleoceras
  - †Teleoceras hicksi
  - Cf. †Teleoceras major
- Thomomys
  - Cf. †Thomomys gidleyi
  - Undescribed Pliocene Ringold Formation fossil
- †Trigonictis
  - †Trigonictis cookii
  - †Trigonictis macrodon

=== Mammals W-Z ===
- †Wimahl - type locality for genus
  - †Wimahl chinookensis - type locality for species
- †Zarhinocetus
  - †Zarhinocetus donnamatsonae – type locality for species
