= Coryphiini =

Scientific classification
- Kingdom: Animalia
- Phylum: Arthropoda
- Clade: Pancrustacea
- Class: Insecta
- Order: Coleoptera
- Suborder: Polyphaga
- Infraorder: Staphyliniformia
- Family: Staphylinidae
- Subfamily: Omaliinae
- Tribe: Coryphiini; Jakobson, 1908

Tribe of rove beetles

Coryphiini is a tribe of rove beetles in the subfamily Omaliinae. It was first described by Jakobson in 1908. It contains 2 subtribes, 25 genera, and 178 accepted species. Recorded observations of Coryphiini members have been made mostly in Sweden, Norway, and the United Kingdom.

== Subtribes and genera ==
- Boreaphilina
  - Archaeoboreaphilus
  - Boreaphilus
  - Caloboreaphilus
  - Gnathoryphium
  - Hypsonothrus
  - Niphetodops
- Coryphiina
  - Altaioniphetodes
  - Coryphiocnemus
  - Coryphiodes
  - Coryphiomorphus
  - Coryphiopsis
  - Coryphium
  - Epheliunus
  - Eudectus
  - Haida
  - Holoboreaphilus
  - Murathus
  - Niphetodes
  - Occiephelinus
  - Ophthalmoniphetodes
  - Pareudectus
  - Planeboreaphilus
  - Platycoryphium
  - Pseudohaida
  - Subhaida
