= Omalorphanus =

Scientific classification
- Domain: Eukaryota
- Kingdom: Animalia
- Phylum: Arthropoda
- Class: Insecta
- Order: Coleoptera
- Suborder: Polyphaga
- Infraorder: Staphyliniformia
- Family: Staphylinidae
- Subfamily: Omaliinae
- Tribe: Anthophagini
- Genus: Omalorphanus; Campbell & Chandler, 1987
- Species: O. aenigma

Binomial name
- Omalorphanus aenigma Campbell & Chandler, 1987

Species of beetle

Omalorphanus is monotypic genus of beetles in the family Staphylinidae, the rove beetles, where it is placed in the subfamily Omaliinae. The only species is Omalorphanus aenigma . The genus and the species were described by John Milton Campbell and Donald S. Chandler in 1987 from the H.J. Andrews Experimental Forest (Oregon) at elevations of 3,500 feet (1,100 m) to 4,000 feet (1,200 m). It was described by them as unusual for its number of unusual morphological features, which made the placement of the species difficult.

== Taxonomy ==
Omalorphanus was assigned to the subfamily Omaliinae for its "unique and complex omaliine-type defense gland (a gland that by that by emitting an offensive secretion or vapor serves to repel enemies) on sternite 8" and for the distinct spiracles on tergites 2–6. These characteristics limited the genus to the subfamilies Omaliinae, Microsilphinae and Empelinae. According to Campbell and Chandler, the Microsilphinae consisted of 3 genera from the southern hemisphere and was also considered to be a tribe of Omaliinae, while Empelinae was a monotypic subfamily, only consisting of one genera and species which was unknown to them.
