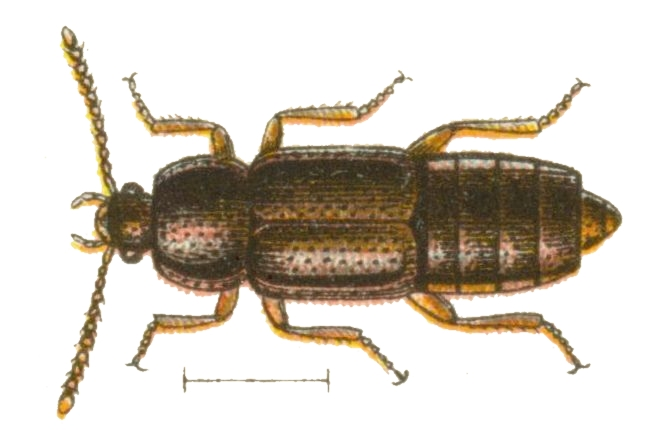
- Acidota crenata

Scientific classification
- Kingdom: Animalia
- Phylum: Arthropoda
- Clade: Pancrustacea
- Class: Insecta
- Order: Coleoptera
- Suborder: Polyphaga
- Infraorder: Staphyliniformia
- Family: Staphylinidae
- Subfamily: Omaliinae
- Tribe: Anthophagini; Thomson, 1859

= Anthophagini =

Tribe of beetles

Anthophagini is a tribe of ocellate rove beetles in the family Staphylinidae. It has Holarctic and Oriental distribution.

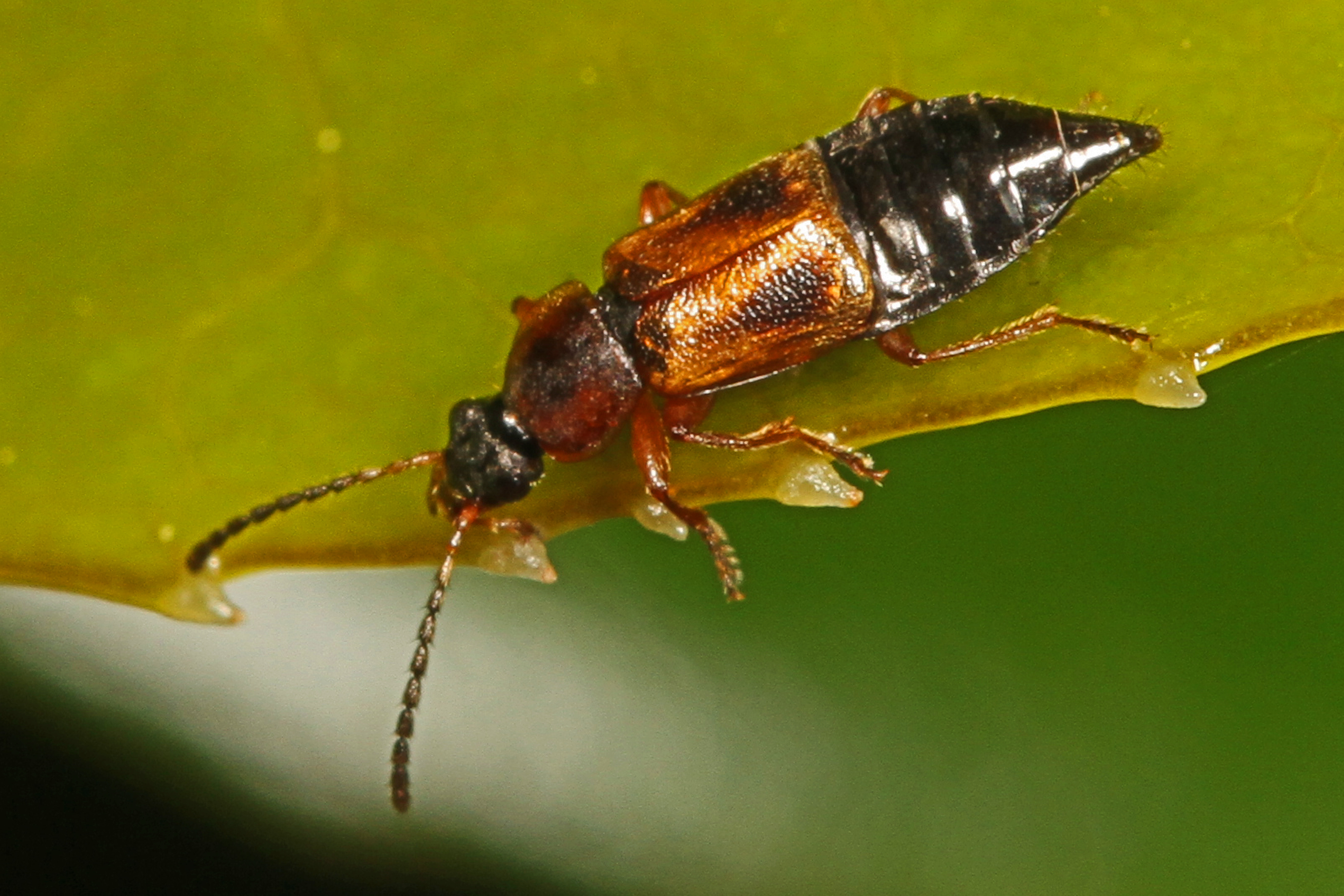
Pelecomalium

== Genera ==
These 45 genera belong to the tribe Anthophagini:

- Acidota Stephens, 1829
- Altaiodromicus Zerche, 1992
- Amphichroum Kraatz, 1857
- Anthobioides Campbell, 1987
- Anthobiomorphus Shavrin & Smetana, 2020
- Anthobium Leach, 1819
- Anthophagus Gravenhorst, 1802
- Arpedium Erichson, 1839
- Artochia Casey, 1893
- Asiageodromicus Shavrin, 2024
- Brathinus LeConte, J. L., 1852
- Camioleum Lewis, 1893
- Caucanthobium Assing, 2018
- Cylletron Thomson, C. G., 1859
- Deinopteroloma Jansson, 1946
- Deliphrosoma Reitter, 1909
- Emodensia Coiffait, 1977
- Eucnecosum Reitter, 1909
- Geodromicus Redtenbacher, L., 1857
- Himalodromeus Shavrin, 2024
- Hygrodromicus Tronquet, 1981
- Hygrogeus Mulsant & Rey, 1880
- Lesteva Latreille, 1797
- Liophilydrodes Nakane, 1983
- Mannerheimia Mäklin, 1880
- Microedus LeConte, J. L., 1874
- Olophrum Erichson, 1839
- Omalorphanus Campbell & Chandler, 1987
- Orobanus LeConte, J. L., 1878
- Orochares Kraatz, 1857
- Paratrichodromeus Zerche, 1992
- Pelecomalium Casey, 1886
- Philhydrodema Scheerpeltz, 1976
- Philorinum Kraatz, 1857
- Philydrodes Bernhauer, 1929
- Phlaeopterus Motschulsky, 1853
- Phyllodrepoidea Ganglbauer, 1895
- Porrhodites Kraatz, 1857
- †Sinanthobium Cai, Chenyang & Diying Huang, 2013
- Tanyrhinus Mannerheim, 1852
- Trichodromeus Luze, 1903
- Trigonodemus LeConte, J. L., 1863
- Uenohadesina Smetana, 2000
- Unamis Casey, 1893
- Xenicopoda Moore & Legner, 1971
