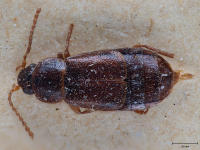
- Eucnecosum brachypterum

Scientific classification
- Kingdom: Animalia
- Phylum: Arthropoda
- Class: Insecta
- Order: Coleoptera
- Suborder: Polyphaga
- Infraorder: Staphyliniformia
- Family: Staphylinidae
- Subfamily: Omaliinae
- Tribe: Anthophagini
- Genus: Eucnecosum; Reitter, 1909

= Eucnecosum =

Genus of beetles

Eucnecosum is a genus of beetles belonging to the family Staphylinidae.

The genus was first described by Edmund Reitter in 1909.

The species of this genus are found in Europe and Northern America.

Species:

- Eucnecosum brachypterum
- Eucnecosum brunnescens
