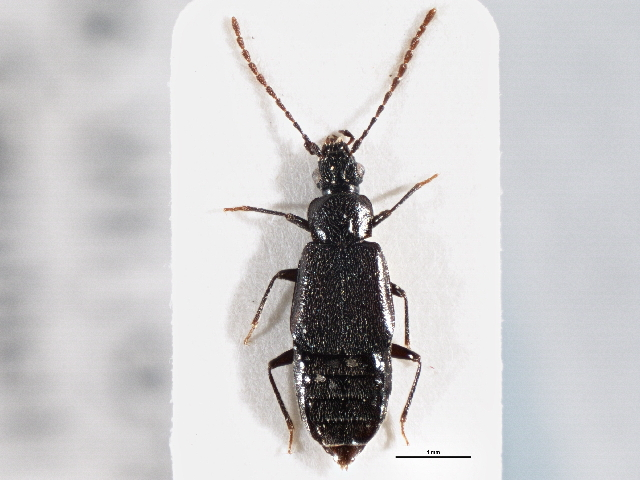
- Microedus laticollis

Scientific classification
- Kingdom: Animalia
- Phylum: Arthropoda
- Class: Insecta
- Order: Coleoptera
- Suborder: Polyphaga
- Infraorder: Staphyliniformia
- Family: Staphylinidae
- Tribe: Anthophagini
- Genus: Microedus; LeConte, J.L. (1874)

= Microedus =

Genus of beetles

Microedus is a genus of rove beetles in the family Staphylinidae, subfamily Omaliinae.

== Species ==
There are about 7 species described in Microedus:

- Microedus austinianus (LeConte, J. L., 1874) - CA
- Microedus ewingi (Hatch, 1957) - WA
- Microedus fenderi (Hatch, 1957) - BC WA
- Microedus giulianii (Moore & Legner, 1972) - CA
- Microedus laticollis (Mannerheim, 1843) - AB BC AK ID OR WA
- Microedus porterae (Hatch, 1957) - AB BC ID OR WA
- Microedus rogersi (Hatch, 1957) - BC WA
