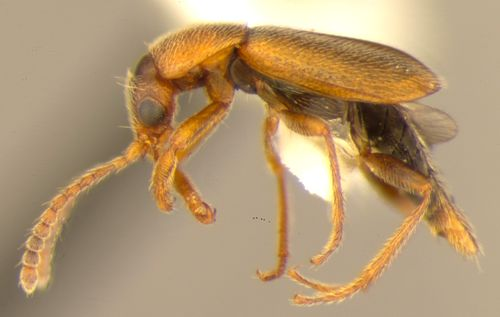

Scientific classification
- Kingdom: Animalia
- Phylum: Arthropoda
- Class: Insecta
- Order: Coleoptera
- Suborder: Polyphaga
- Infraorder: Staphyliniformia
- Family: Staphylinidae
- Subfamily: Omaliinae
- Tribe: Anthophagini
- Genus: Xenicopoda; Moore & Legner, 1971
- Species: X. helenae

Binomial name
- Xenicopoda helenae Moore & Legner, 1971

= Xenicopoda =

Species of beetle

Xenicopoda helenae is a species of beetle of the Staphylinidae family, Anthophagini tribe. It is the only species of genus Xenicopoda. The species is present in California.
