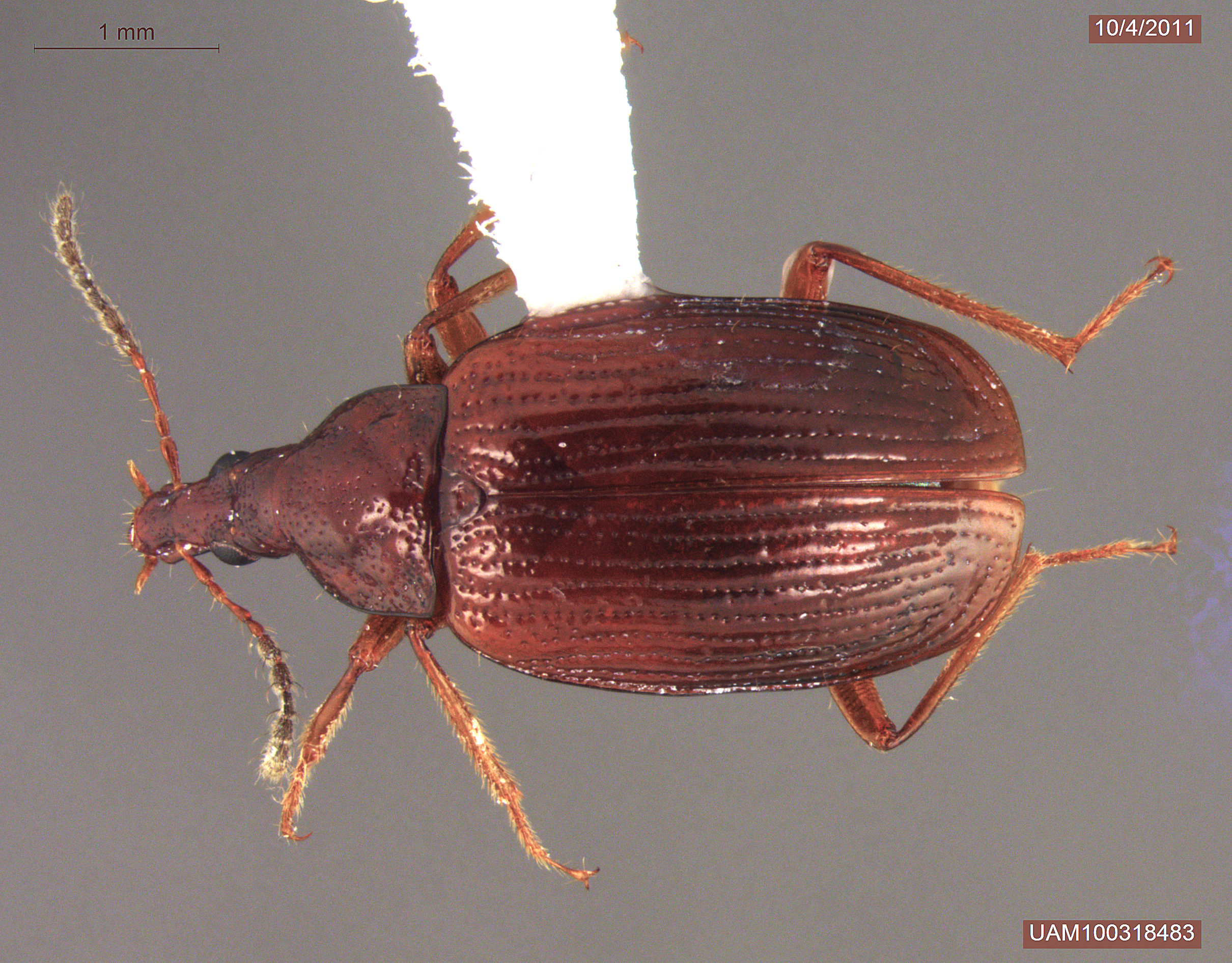

Scientific classification
- Kingdom: Animalia
- Phylum: Arthropoda
- Class: Insecta
- Order: Coleoptera
- Suborder: Polyphaga
- Infraorder: Staphyliniformia
- Family: Staphylinidae
- Subfamily: Omaliinae
- Tribe: Anthophagini
- Genus: Tanyrhinus; Mannerheim, 1852
- Species: T. singularis

Binomial name
- Tanyrhinus singularis Mannerheim, 1852

= Tanyrhinus =

Species of beetle

Tanyrhinus is a monotypic genus of beetles in the tribe Anthophagini of the family Staphylinidae, the rove beetles. The sole species is Tanyrhinus singularis. It is found in western North America, specifically in British Columbia, Canada and in the US states California, Oregon, Washington, and Alaska. Its nearest relative is Trigonodemus.

Unlike typical rove beetles, Tanyrhinus have long elytra that cover almost the entire abdomen.
