= Unamis =

Scientific classification
- Kingdom: Animalia
- Phylum: Arthropoda
- Clade: Pancrustacea
- Class: Insecta
- Order: Coleoptera
- Suborder: Polyphaga
- Infraorder: Staphyliniformia
- Family: Staphylinidae
- Tribe: Anthophagini
- Genus: Unamis; Casey, 1893

Genus of beetles

Unamis is a genus of rove beetles in the family Staphylinidae, subfamily Omaliinae.

== Species ==
There are some seven species described in Unamis:

- Unamis bjorkmanae (Hatch, 1957) - Oregon
- Unamis columbiensis (Hatch, 1957) - British Columbia and the US
- Unamis fulvipes (Fall, 1922) - British Columbia, California, Oregon and Washington
- Unamis giulianii (Moore & Legner, 1972) - California
- Unamis kootenayensis (Hatch, 1957) - British Columbia
- Unamis stacesmithi (Hatch, 1957) - British Columbia
- Unamis truncata (Casey, 1885) - British Columbia, California, Idaho, Oregon and Washington
