= List of Eusphalerum species =

This is a list of 133 species in Eusphalerum, a genus of ocellate rove beetles in the family Staphylinidae.

== Eusphalerum species ==
- Eusphalerum aetolicum (Kraatz, 1858)^{g}
- Eusphalerum akikoae Watanabe, 1999^{c g}
- Eusphalerum albertae Zanetti, 1981^{g}
- Eusphalerum albipile (Fauvel, 1900)^{g}
- Eusphalerum alpinum (Heer, 1839)^{g}
- Eusphalerum alticola Zanetti, 2004^{c g}
- Eusphalerum anale (Erichson, 1840)^{g}
- Eusphalerum angusticolle Fauvel, 1871^{g}
- Eusphalerum angustum (Kiesenwetter, 1850)^{g}
- Eusphalerum annaerosae Zanetti, 1986^{g}
- Eusphalerum bargaglii (Luze, 1910)^{g}
- Eusphalerum baudii (Fiori, 1894)^{g}
- Eusphalerum bivittatum (Eppelsheim, 1887)^{g}
- Eusphalerum bolivari (Koch, 1940)^{g}
- Eusphalerum brandmayri Zanetti, 1981^{g}
- Eusphalerum calabrum Zanetti, 1980^{g}
- Eusphalerum californicum (Fauvel, 1878)^{g}
- Eusphalerum cariniphallum Zanetti, 1998^{c g}
- Eusphalerum caucasicum (Bernhauer, 1908)^{g}
- Eusphalerum celsum (Luze, 1910)^{g}
- Eusphalerum cerrutii (Bernhauer, 1940)^{g}
- Eusphalerum chinecum Li, 1992^{c g}
- Eusphalerum chinense Bernhauer, 1938^{c g}
- Eusphalerum clavipes (Scriba, 1868)^{g}
- Eusphalerum coiffaiti Nicolas, 1974^{g}
- Eusphalerum contortispinum Zanetti, 1998^{c g}
- Eusphalerum convexum Fauvel, 1878^{g b}
- Eusphalerum corsicum (Luze, 1910)^{g}
- Eusphalerum cribrellum (Fauvel, 1900)^{g}
- Eusphalerum croaticum (Luze, 1910)^{g}
- Eusphalerum daxuense Zanetti, 2004^{c g}
- Eusphalerum dissimile (Luze, 1910)^{g}
- Eusphalerum dubitatum Zanetti, 1998^{c g}
- Eusphalerum elongatum (Ganglbauer, 1895)^{g}
- Eusphalerum erdaoense Zanetti, 2004^{c g}
- Eusphalerum farrarae (Hatch, 1944)^{g}
- Eusphalerum fenyesi ^{b}
- Eusphalerum ferruccii Zanetti, 2004^{c g}
- Eusphalerum formosae Cameron, 1949^{c g}
- Eusphalerum foveicolle (Fauvel, 1871)^{g}
- Eusphalerum fujianense Zanetti, 2004^{c g}
- Eusphalerum grayae (Hatch, 1944)^{g}
- Eusphalerum hapalaraeoides Zanetti, 1998^{c g}
- Eusphalerum hispanicum (Brisout de Barneville, 1866)^{g}
- Eusphalerum horni ^{b}
- Eusphalerum impressicolle (Kiesenwetter, 1850)^{g}
- Eusphalerum italicum (Koch, 1938)^{g}
- Eusphalerum jiudingense Zanetti, 2004^{c g}
- Eusphalerum jizuense Zanetti, 2004^{c g}
- Eusphalerum kahleni Zanetti, 1986^{g}
- Eusphalerum kraatzii (Jacquelin du Val, 1857)^{g}
- Eusphalerum kubani Zanetti, 2004^{c g}
- Eusphalerum lapponicum (Mannerheim, 1830)^{g}
- Eusphalerum liepolti (Bernhauer, 1943)^{g}
- Eusphalerum limbatum (Erichson, 1840)^{g}
- Eusphalerum lindbergi (Bernhauer, 1931)^{g}
- Eusphalerum luteicorne (Erichson, 1840)^{g}
- Eusphalerum luteoides Zanetti, 1998^{c g}
- Eusphalerum luteum (Marsham, 1802)^{g}
- Eusphalerum macropterum (Kraatz, 1857)^{g}
- Eusphalerum malaisei Scheerpeltz, 1965^{c g}
- Eusphalerum marshami (Fauvel, 1869)^{g}
- Eusphalerum masatakai Watanabe, 1999^{c g}
- Eusphalerum metasternale (Fauvel, 1898)^{g}
- Eusphalerum miaoershanum Watanabe, 1999^{c g}
- Eusphalerum michaeli Zanetti, 2004^{c g}
- Eusphalerum minutum (Fabricius, 1792)^{g}
- Eusphalerum miricolle (Sainte-Claire Deville, 1901)^{g}
- Eusphalerum mocsarkii Bernhauer, 1913^{c g}
- Eusphalerum montivagum (Heer, 1839)^{g}
- Eusphalerum morator Zanetti, 1986^{g}
- Eusphalerum nigriceps (Fauvel, 1871)^{g}
- Eusphalerum nitidicolle (Baudi, 1857)^{g}
- Eusphalerum oblitum (Fairmaire & Laboulbène, 1856)^{g}
- Eusphalerum obscuriceps Zanetti, 1998^{c g}
- Eusphalerum obsoletum (Erichson, 1840)^{g}
- Eusphalerum obtusicolle (Fauvel, 1876)^{g}
- Eusphalerum occidentale Coiffait, 1959^{g}
- Eusphalerum octavii (Fauvel, 1871)^{g}
- Eusphalerum orientale ^{b}
- Eusphalerum pallens (Heer, 1841)^{g}
- Eusphalerum palligerum (Kiesenwetter, 1847)^{g}
- Eusphalerum parareitteri Zanetti, 1998^{c g}
- Eusphalerum parnassicum (Bernhauer, 1910)^{g}
- Eusphalerum paucisetulosum Zanetti, 1998^{c g}
- Eusphalerum petzi (Bernhauer, 1910)^{g}
- Eusphalerum petzianum (Bernhauer, 1929)^{g}
- Eusphalerum pfefferi (Roubal, 1941)^{g}
- Eusphalerum pothos (Mannerheim, 1843)^{g b}
- Eusphalerum primulae (Stephens, 1834)^{g}
- Eusphalerum procerum (Baudi di Selve, 1857)^{g}
- Eusphalerum pruinosum (Fauvel, 1871)^{g}
- Eusphalerum pseudaucupariae (E.Strand, 1916)^{g}
- Eusphalerum pseudoreitteri Zanetti, 1998^{c g}
- Eusphalerum puetzi Zanetti, 2004^{c g}
- Eusphalerum pulcherrimum (Bernhauer, 1901)^{g}
- Eusphalerum pyrenaeum Tronquet & Zanetti, 2008^{g}
- Eusphalerum rectangulum (Baudi, 1870)^{g}
- Eusphalerum reflexum Zanetti, 2004^{c g}
- Eusphalerum rizzottivlachi Zanetti, 1992^{g}
- Eusphalerum robustum (Heer, 1839)^{g}
- Eusphalerum rougemonti Zanetti, 2004^{c g}
- Eusphalerum ruffoi (Scheerpeltz, 1956)^{g}
- Eusphalerum rugulosum (Méklin, 1853)^{g b}
- Eusphalerum schatzmayri (Koch, 1938)^{g}
- Eusphalerum schillhammeri Zanetti, 2004^{c g}
- Eusphalerum scribae (Schaufuss, 1862)^{g}
- Eusphalerum segmentarium (Méklin, 1852)^{g}
- Eusphalerum semicoleoptratum (Panzer, 1794)^{g}
- Eusphalerum settei Zanetti, 1982^{g}
- Eusphalerum sibiricum Luze, 1910^{c g}
- Eusphalerum sicanum Zanetti, 1980^{g}
- Eusphalerum sichuanense Zanetti, 2004^{c g}
- Eusphalerum signatum (Märkel, 1857)^{g}
- Eusphalerum simpliciphallum Zanetti, 1998^{c g}
- Eusphalerum smetanai Zanetti, 1998^{c g}
- Eusphalerum solitare Sharp, 1874^{c g}
- Eusphalerum songpanense Zanetti, 2004^{c g}
- Eusphalerum sorbicola Kangas, 1941^{c g}
- Eusphalerum stramineum (Kraatz, 1857)^{g}
- Eusphalerum stussineri (Bernhauer, 1909)^{g}
- Eusphalerum subsolanum Herman, 2001^{g}
- Eusphalerum swauki (Onibathum) swauki Hatch, 1957^{g b}
- Eusphalerum taiwanense Zanetti, 1998^{c g}
- Eusphalerum tempestivum (Erichson, 1840)^{g}
- Eusphalerum tenenbaumi (Bernhauer, 1932)^{g}
- Eusphalerum torquatum (Marsham, 1802)^{g}
- Eusphalerum tronqueti Zanetti, 2004^{c g}
- Eusphalerum tronquetianum Zanetti, 2004^{c g}
- Eusphalerum umbellatarum (Kiesenwetter, 1850)^{g}
- Eusphalerum viertli (Ganglbauer, 1895)^{g}
- Eusphalerum zerchei Zanetti, 1992^{g}
- Eusphalerum zhongdianense Zanetti, 2004^{c g}

Data sources: i = ITIS, c = Catalogue of Life, g = GBIF, b = Bugguide.net
