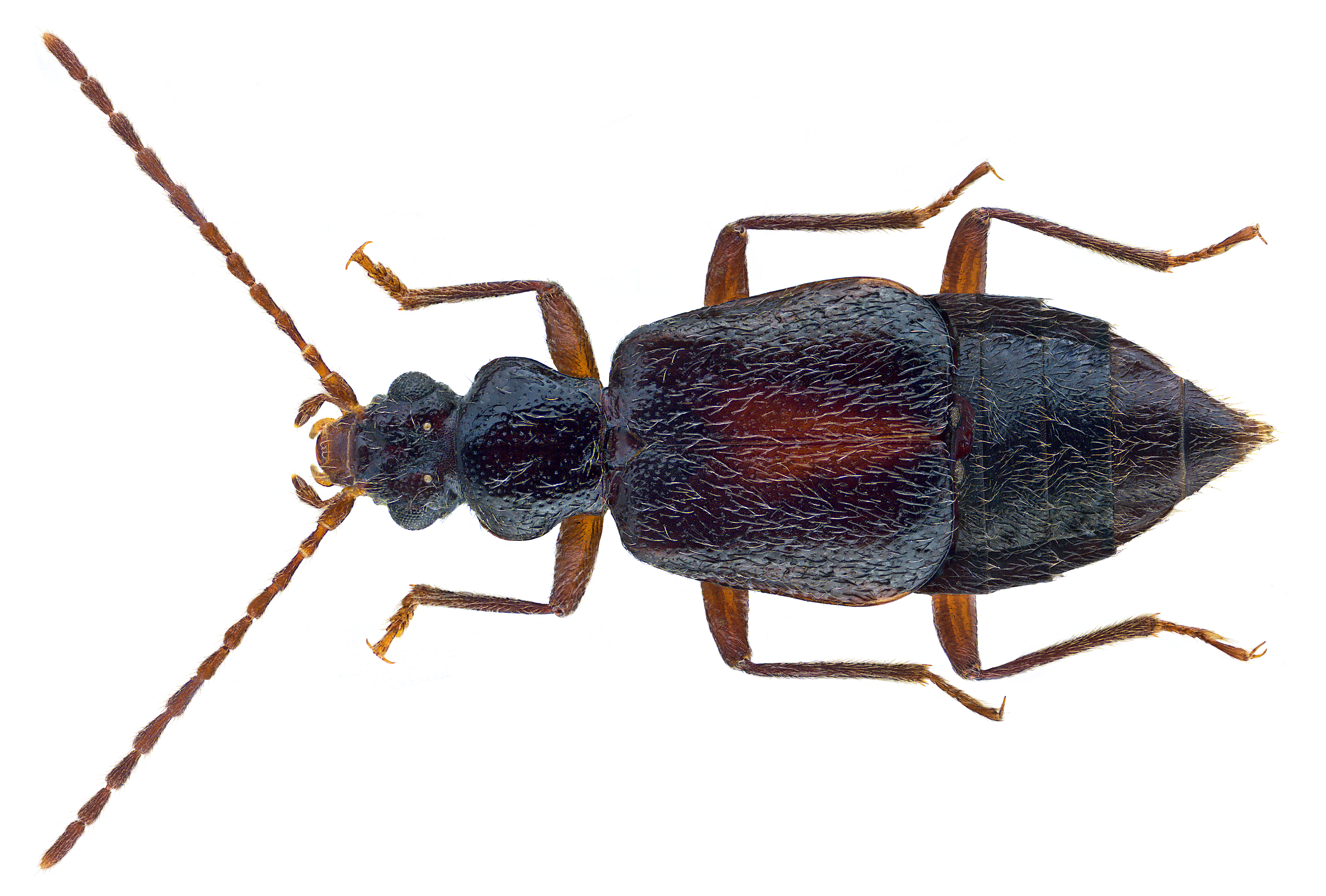
- Geodromicus suturalis

Scientific classification
- Domain: Eukaryota
- Kingdom: Animalia
- Phylum: Arthropoda
- Class: Insecta
- Order: Coleoptera
- Suborder: Polyphaga
- Infraorder: Staphyliniformia
- Family: Staphylinidae
- Subfamily: Omaliinae
- Tribe: Anthophagini
- Genus: Geodromicus; Redtenbacher, 1857

= Geodromicus =

Genus of beetles

Geodromicus is a genus of beetles belonging to the family Staphylinidae.

The genus was first described by Ludwig Redtenbacher in 1857.

The species of this genus are found in Eurasia and Northern America.

Species:

- Geodromicus nigrita
- Geodromicus plagiatus
- Geodromicus glabulicollis
