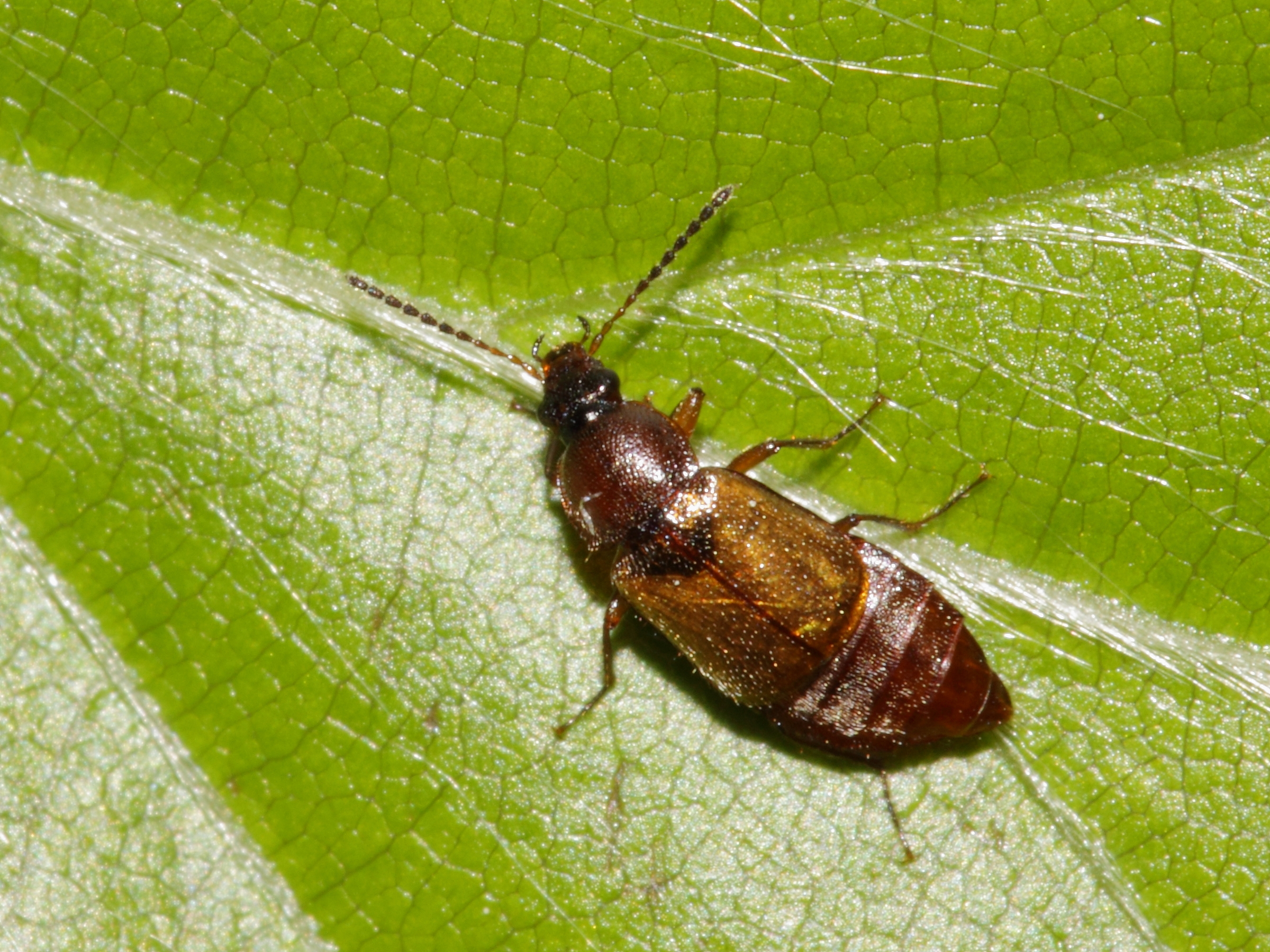
- Amphichroum canaliculatum

Scientific classification
- Kingdom: Animalia
- Phylum: Arthropoda
- Clade: Pancrustacea
- Class: Insecta
- Order: Coleoptera
- Suborder: Polyphaga
- Infraorder: Staphyliniformia
- Family: Staphylinidae
- Tribe: Anthophagini
- Genus: Amphichroum; Kraatz, 1857

= Amphichroum =

Genus of beetles

Amphichroum is a genus of rove beetles in the family Staphylinidae, subfamily Omaliinae.

== Species ==
There are about 32 species described in Amphichroum:

- Amphichroum ahrensi (Shavrin, 2021)
- Amphichroum albanicum (Bernhauer, 1936)
- Amphichroum altivagans (Cameron, 1941)
- Amphichroum angustilobatum (Shavrin & Smetana, 2018)
- Amphichroum anthobioides (Champion, 1925)
- Amphichroum assingi (Shavrin & Smetana, 2018)
- Amphichroum brachypterum (Shavrin, 2022)
- Amphichroum canaliculatum (Erichson, 1840)
- Amphichroum cuccodoroi (Shavrin, 2022)
- Amphichroum feldmanni (Shavrin, 2019)
- Amphichroum floribundum (LeConte, 1863)
- Amphichroum hirtellum (Heer, 1893)
- Amphichroum kambaitiense (Scheerpeltz, 1965)
- Amphichroum longilobatum (Shavrin & Smetana, 2018)
- Amphichroum maculatum (Shavrin & Smetana, 2018)
- Amphichroum maculicolle (Mannerheim, 1843)
- Amphichroum maculosum (Shavrin & Smetana, 2018)
- Amphichroum miaoershanum (Watanabe, 1999)
- Amphichroum milkensis (Coiffait, 1984)
- Amphichroum monticola (Cameron, 1928)
- Amphichroum nepalicum (Coiffait, 1982)
- Amphichroum pindarense (Champion, 1920)
- Amphichroum propinquum (Shavrin & Smetana, 2018)
- Amphichroum queinneci (Coiffait, 1984)
- Amphichroum reticulatum (Coiffait, 1978)
- Amphichroum rotundatum (Shavrin & Smetana, 2018)
- Amphichroum schuelkei (Shavrin & Smetana, 2018)
- Amphichroum squamosum (Shavrin & Smetana, 2018)
- Amphichroum subaequale (Shavrin & Smetana, 2018)
- Amphichroum subelongatum (Shavrin & Smetana, 2018)
- Amphichroum telnovi (Shavrin, 2021)
- Amphichroum tibetanum (Shavrin & Smetana, 2018)
