= Orobanus =

Scientific classification
- Kingdom: Animalia
- Phylum: Arthropoda
- Class: Insecta
- Order: Coleoptera
- Suborder: Polyphaga
- Infraorder: Staphyliniformia
- Family: Staphylinidae
- Tribe: Anthophagini
- Genus: Orobanus; LeConte, J. L., 1878

Genus of beetles

Orobanus is a genus of rove beetles in the family Staphylinidae, subfamily Omaliinae.

== Species ==
There are about 7 species described in Orobanus:

- Orobanus densus (Casey, 1886) - CA
- Orobanus falli (Mank, 1934) - BC CA OR WA
- Orobanus montanus (Mank, 1934) - MT WA
- Orobanus mormonus (Mank, 1934) - UT
- Orobanus rufipes (Casey, 1886) - BC CA ID OR WA
- Orobanus simulator (LeConte, J. L., 1878) - BC CA CO OR WA
- Orobanus tarsalis (Hatch, 1957) - BC OR WA
