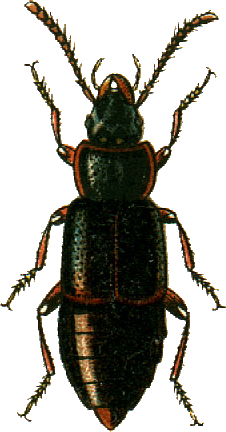
- Arpedium sp.

Scientific classification
- Kingdom: Animalia
- Phylum: Arthropoda
- Class: Insecta
- Order: Coleoptera
- Suborder: Polyphaga
- Infraorder: Staphyliniformia
- Family: Staphylinidae
- Subfamily: Omaliinae
- Tribe: Anthophagini
- Genus: Arpedium; Erichson, 1839

= Arpedium =

Genus of beetles

Arpedium is a genus of beetles belonging to the family Staphylinidae.

The genus was first described by Wilhelm Ferdinand Erichson in 1839.

The species of this genus are found in Europe, Japan and North America.

Species:

- Arpedium cribratum Fauvel, 1878
- Arpedium quadrum (Gravenhorst, 1806)
