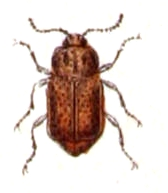
- Anthobium melanocephalum

Scientific classification
- Kingdom: Animalia
- Phylum: Arthropoda
- Class: Insecta
- Order: Coleoptera
- Suborder: Polyphaga
- Infraorder: Staphyliniformia
- Family: Staphylinidae
- Subfamily: Omaliinae
- Tribe: Anthophagini
- Genus: Anthobium; Leach, 1819

= Anthobium =

Genus of beetles

Anthobium is a genus of beetles belonging to the family Staphylinidae.

The genus was first described by William Elford Leach in 1819.

Synonyms:

- Lathrimaeum Erichson, 1839
- Eudeliphrum Champion, 1920

Species:

- Anthobium atrocephalum
- Anthobium melanocephalum
