= Artochia =

Scientific classification
- Kingdom: Animalia
- Phylum: Arthropoda
- Class: Insecta
- Order: Coleoptera
- Suborder: Polyphaga
- Infraorder: Staphyliniformia
- Family: Staphylinidae
- Tribe: Anthophagini
- Genus: Artochia; Casey, 1803

Genus of beetles

Artochia is a genus of rove beetles in the family Staphylinidae, subfamily Omaliinae.

== Species ==
There are only 2 species described in Artochia:

- Artochia californica (Bernhauer, 1912) - CA
- Artochia productifrons (Casey, 1893) - BC AK CA OR UT WA
