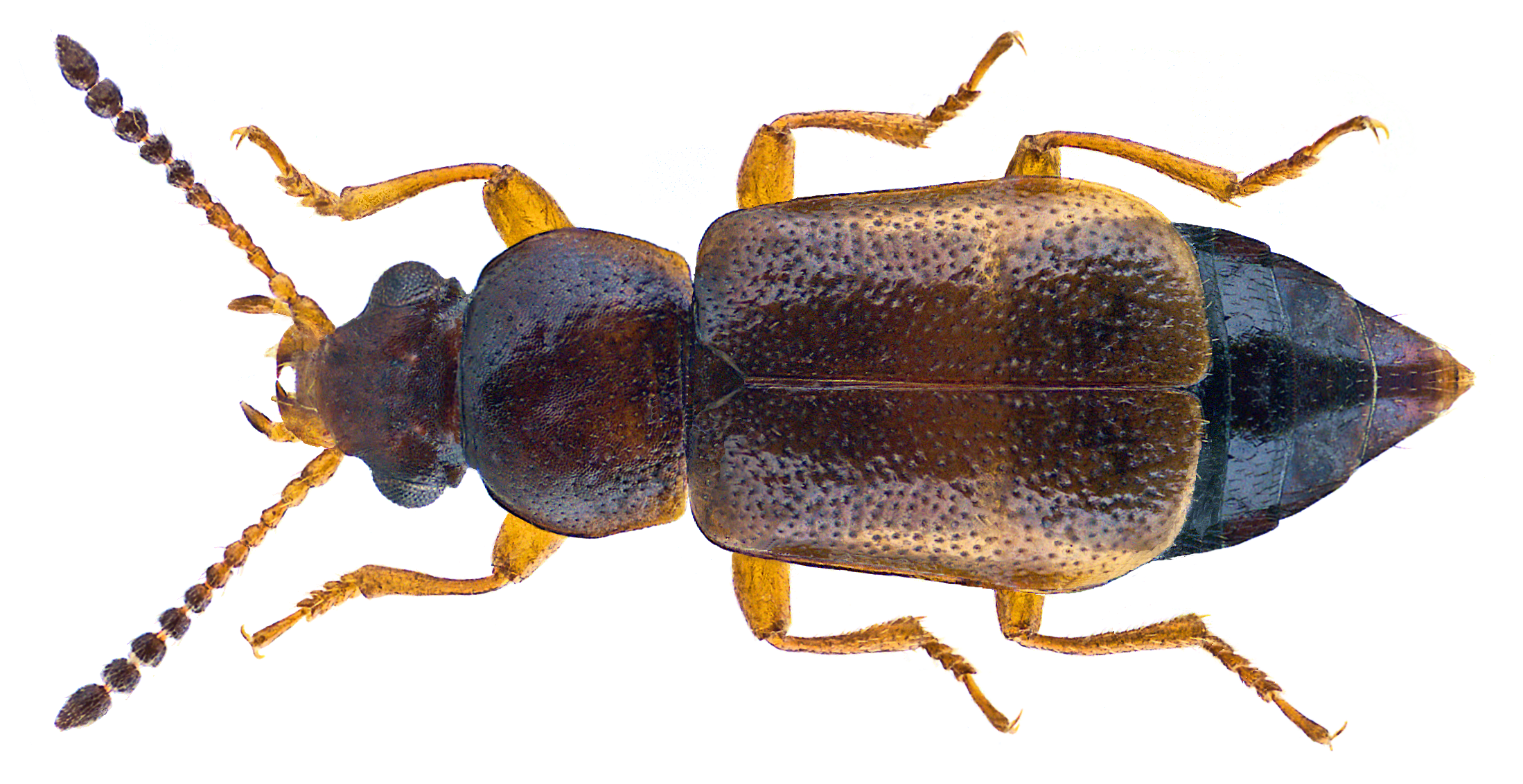
- Eusphalerum minutum 2.4 mm (2.0 to 2.5 mm)

Scientific classification
- Kingdom: Animalia
- Phylum: Arthropoda
- Clade: Pancrustacea
- Class: Insecta
- Order: Coleoptera
- Suborder: Polyphaga
- Infraorder: Staphyliniformia
- Family: Staphylinidae
- Genus: Eusphalerum
- Species: E. minutum

Binomial name
- Eusphalerum minutum (Fabricius, 1791)

= Eusphalerum minutum =

Species of beetle

Eusphalerum minutum is a species of rove beetle native to Europe.
