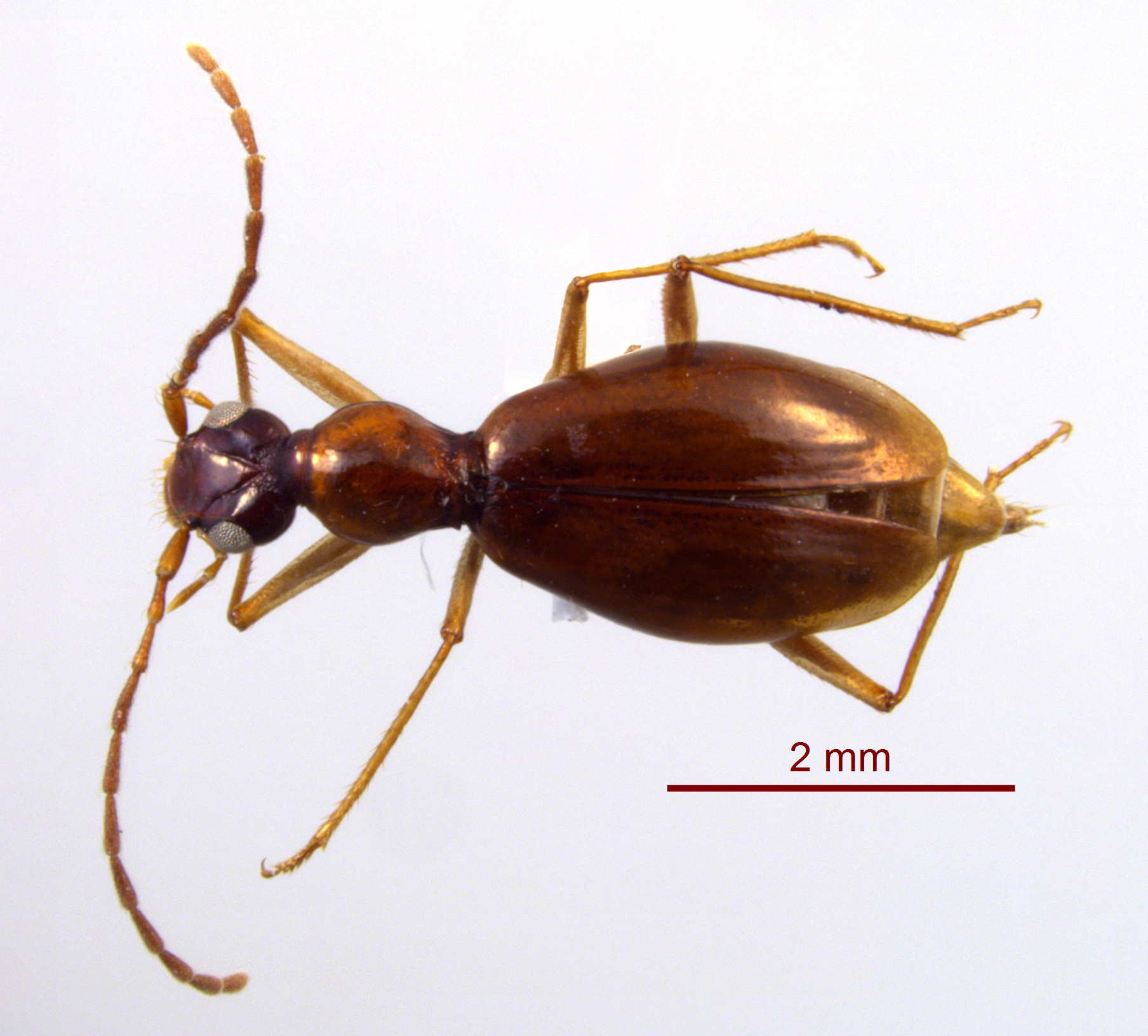
- Brathinus nitidus

Scientific classification
- Kingdom: Animalia
- Phylum: Arthropoda
- Class: Insecta
- Order: Coleoptera
- Suborder: Polyphaga
- Infraorder: Staphyliniformia
- Family: Staphylinidae
- Tribe: Anthophagini
- Genus: Brathinus; LeConte, 1852

= Brathinus =

Genus of beetles

Brathinus is a genus of rove beetles in the family Staphylinidae. The genus occurs in both North America and East Asia (Japan, China). Unlike typical rove beetles, Brathinus have long elytra that cover almost the entire abdomen.

== Species ==
There are six recognized species:

- Brathinus californicus Hubbard, 1894
- Brathinus nitidus LeConte, J. L., 1852
- Brathinus oculatus Lewis, 1886
- Brathinus satoi Kishimoto & Shimada, 2003
- Brathinus shikokuensis Watanabe, Y. & Satô, 1981
- Brathinus varicornis LeConte, J. L., 1852
