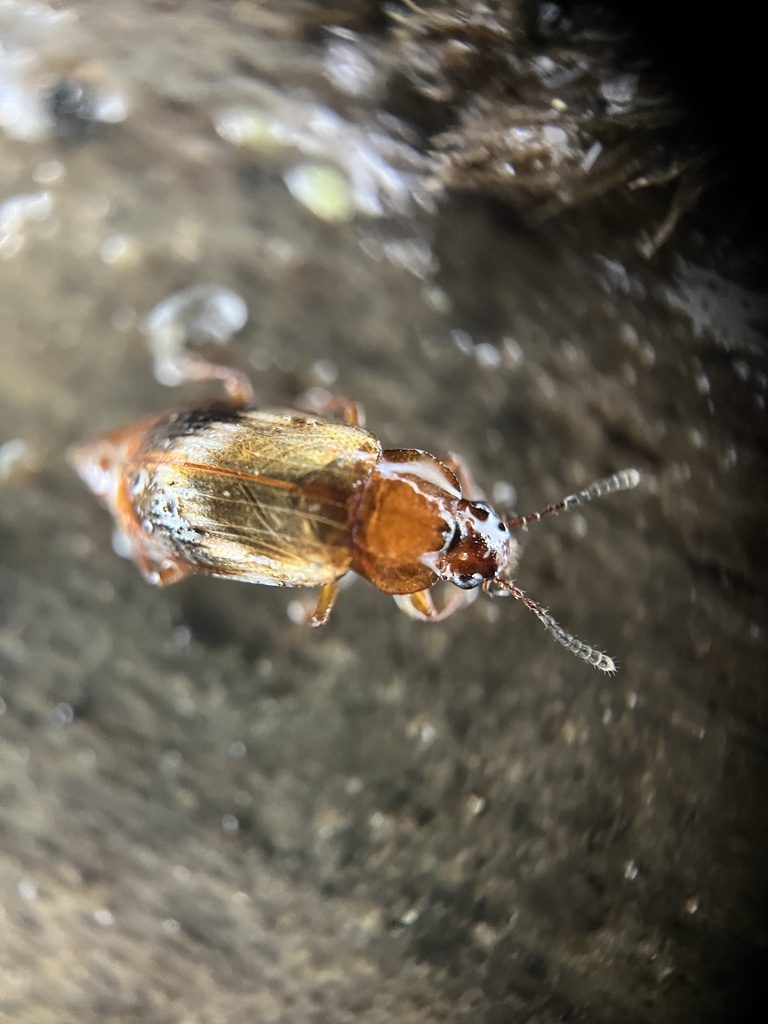

Scientific classification
- Kingdom: Animalia
- Phylum: Arthropoda
- Clade: Pancrustacea
- Class: Insecta
- Order: Coleoptera
- Suborder: Polyphaga
- Infraorder: Staphyliniformia
- Family: Staphylinidae
- Genus: Deinopteroloma
- Species: D. subcostatum

Binomial name
- Deinopteroloma subcostatum (Mäklin, 1852)

= Deinopteroloma subcostatum =

Species of beetle

Deinopteroloma subcostatum, the weakly-ribbed ocellate rove beetle, is a species of beetle in the family Staphylinidae. It is endemic to the Pacific Northwest. It lives under wet wood debris and rotting leaves, in forested areas. The overall appearance of this beetle is a large fat black and gold rove beetle. It also has distinctly feathery, deeply segmented antenna. It also has a deeply segmented tail.
