= Deliphrosoma =

Scientific classification
- Kingdom: Animalia
- Phylum: Arthropoda
- Clade: Pancrustacea
- Class: Insecta
- Order: Coleoptera
- Suborder: Polyphaga
- Infraorder: Staphyliniformia
- Family: Staphylinidae
- Subfamily: Omaliinae
- Genus: Deliphrosoma; Reitter, 1909

Genus of beetles

Deliphrosoma is a genus of beetles belonging to the family Staphylinidae. The species of this genus are found in southeastern Europe (from the French Alps east to the Balkans and Crete) and in western Asia (Turkey, Lebabon, Iran). They occur in moist habitats in the subalpine to alpine zone.

== Species ==
There are 25 recognized species:

- Deliphrosoma angulatum Assing & Wunderle, 2001
- Deliphrosoma bakhtiyariense Zerche, 1991
- Deliphrosoma bulgaricum Zerche, 1998
- Deliphrosoma falakroense Zerche, 2002
- Deliphrosoma filimonovi Zerche, 2003
- Deliphrosoma fratellum (Rottenberg, 1874)
- Deliphrosoma freudeorum Zerche, 1996
- Deliphrosoma frischi Shavrin, 2011
- Deliphrosoma kopdagense Bordoni, 1999
- Deliphrosoma libanicum (Fauvel, 1875)
- Deliphrosoma lindbergi (Scheerpeltz, 1958)
- Deliphrosoma lothari Bordoni, 2000
- Deliphrosoma macrocephalum (Eppelsheim, 1873)
- Deliphrosoma mandli (Scheerpeltz, 1937)
- Deliphrosoma morvani (Jarrige, 1971)
- Deliphrosoma pirinense Zerche, 1991
- Deliphrosoma platyophthalmum (Koch, C., 1937)
- Deliphrosoma prolongatum (Rottenberg, 1873)
- Deliphrosoma skalitzkyi (Bernhauer, 1902)
- Deliphrosoma slaviankaense Zerche, 2001
- Deliphrosoma solodovnikovi Zerche, 2003
- Deliphrosoma tendense Zerche, 2001
- Deliphrosoma turcicum Zerche, 1997
- Deliphrosoma weiratheri (Scheerpeltz, 1938)
- Deliphrosoma wunderlei Zerche, 1998
