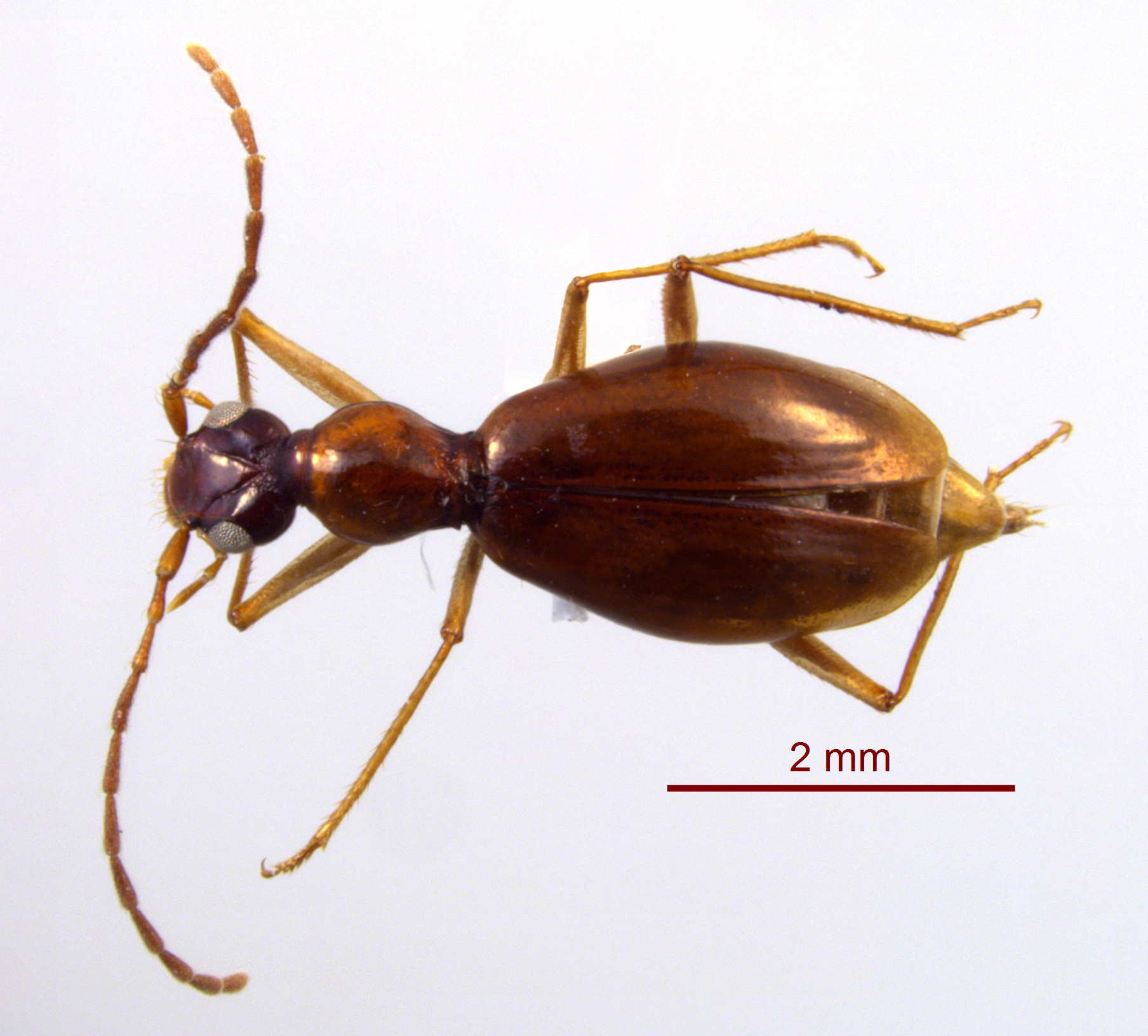

Scientific classification
- Kingdom: Animalia
- Phylum: Arthropoda
- Class: Insecta
- Order: Coleoptera
- Suborder: Polyphaga
- Infraorder: Staphyliniformia
- Family: Staphylinidae
- Genus: Brathinus
- Species: B. nitidus

Binomial name
- Brathinus nitidus LeConte, 1852

= Brathinus nitidus =

Species of beetle

Brathinus nitidus is a species of ocellate rove beetle in the family Staphylinidae.
