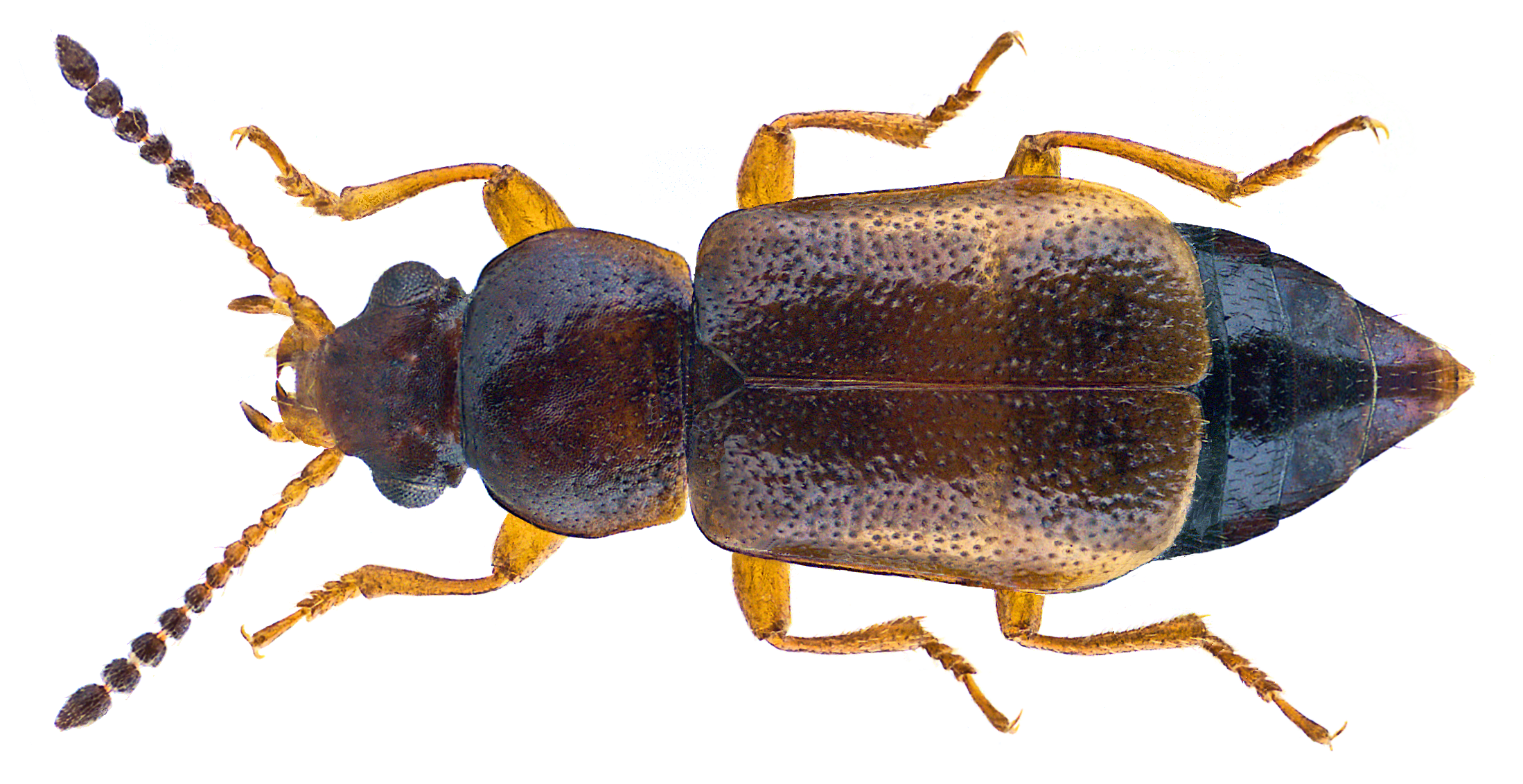
- Eusphalerum minutum

Scientific classification
- Kingdom: Animalia
- Phylum: Arthropoda
- Clade: Pancrustacea
- Class: Insecta
- Order: Coleoptera
- Suborder: Polyphaga
- Infraorder: Staphyliniformia
- Family: Staphylinidae
- Subfamily: Omaliinae
- Tribe: Eusphalerini; Hatch, 1957
- Genus: Eusphalerum; Kraatz, 1857

= Eusphalerum =

Genus of beetles

Eusphalerum is a genus of ocellate rove beetles in the family Staphylinidae. There are at least 130 described species in Eusphalerum. It is the only genus in the tribe Eusphalerini.

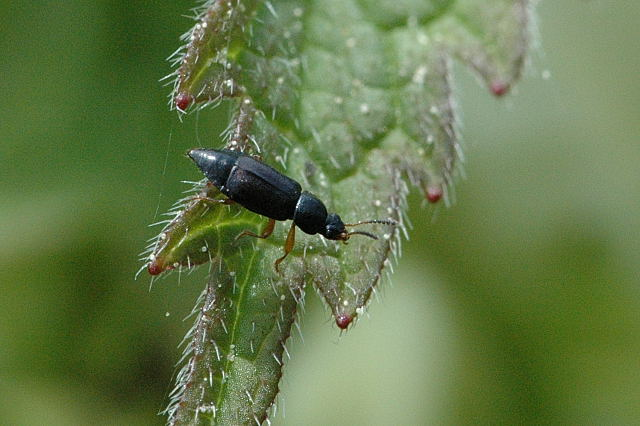

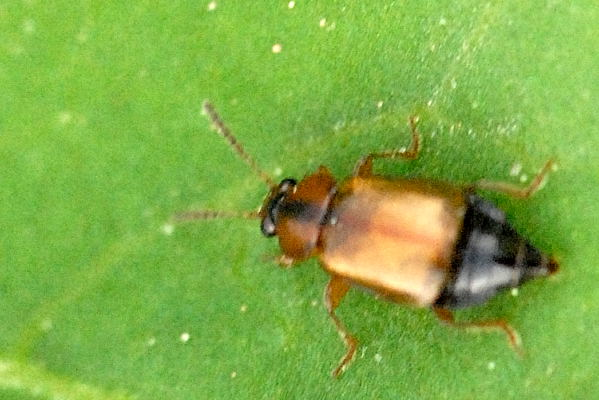

== See also ==
- List of Eusphalerum species
