= Deinopteroloma chiangi =

Scientific classification
- Kingdom: Animalia
- Phylum: Arthropoda
- Clade: Pancrustacea
- Class: Insecta
- Order: Coleoptera
- Suborder: Polyphaga
- Infraorder: Staphyliniformia
- Family: Staphylinidae
- Genus: Deinopteroloma
- Species: D. chiangi

Binomial name
- Deinopteroloma chiangi Smetana, 1990

Synonyms
- Camioleum yasutoshii Watanabe, 1991

Species of beetle

Deinopteroloma chiangi is a species of beetle in the family Staphylinidae. It is endemic to Taiwan and was first collected in Daguan Mountain at 1,600 m (5,200 ft) above sea level. It is named for Chiang Chung-Chu, Taiwanese entomologist.

Deinopteroloma chiangi measure 3.5–3.6 mm (0.14–0.14 in) in length. The elytra are brunneo-testaceous with some whitish or whitish-yellow spots.
