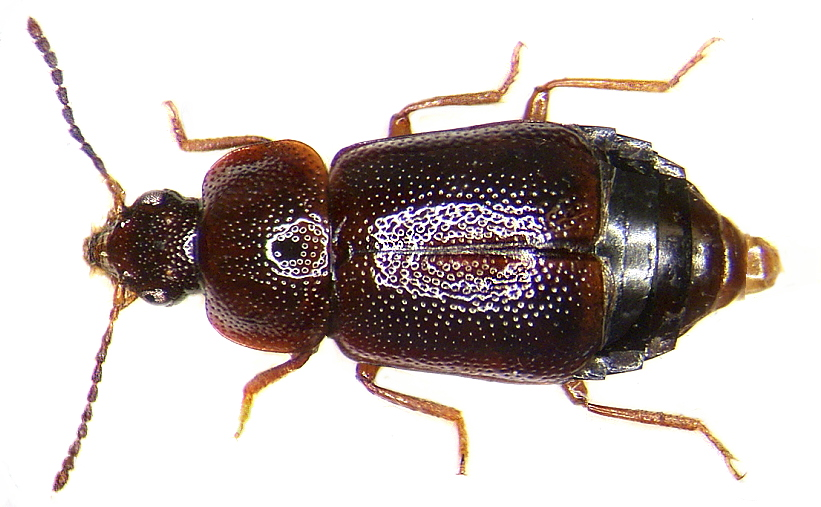
- Olophrum fuscum 5-6 mm

Scientific classification
- Domain: Eukaryota
- Kingdom: Animalia
- Phylum: Arthropoda
- Class: Insecta
- Order: Coleoptera
- Suborder: Polyphaga
- Infraorder: Staphyliniformia
- Family: Staphylinidae
- Genus: Olophrum
- Species: O. fuscum

Binomial name
- Olophrum fuscum (Gravenhorst, 1806)

= Olophrum fuscum =

Species of beetle

Olophrum fuscum is a species of rove beetle native to Europe.
