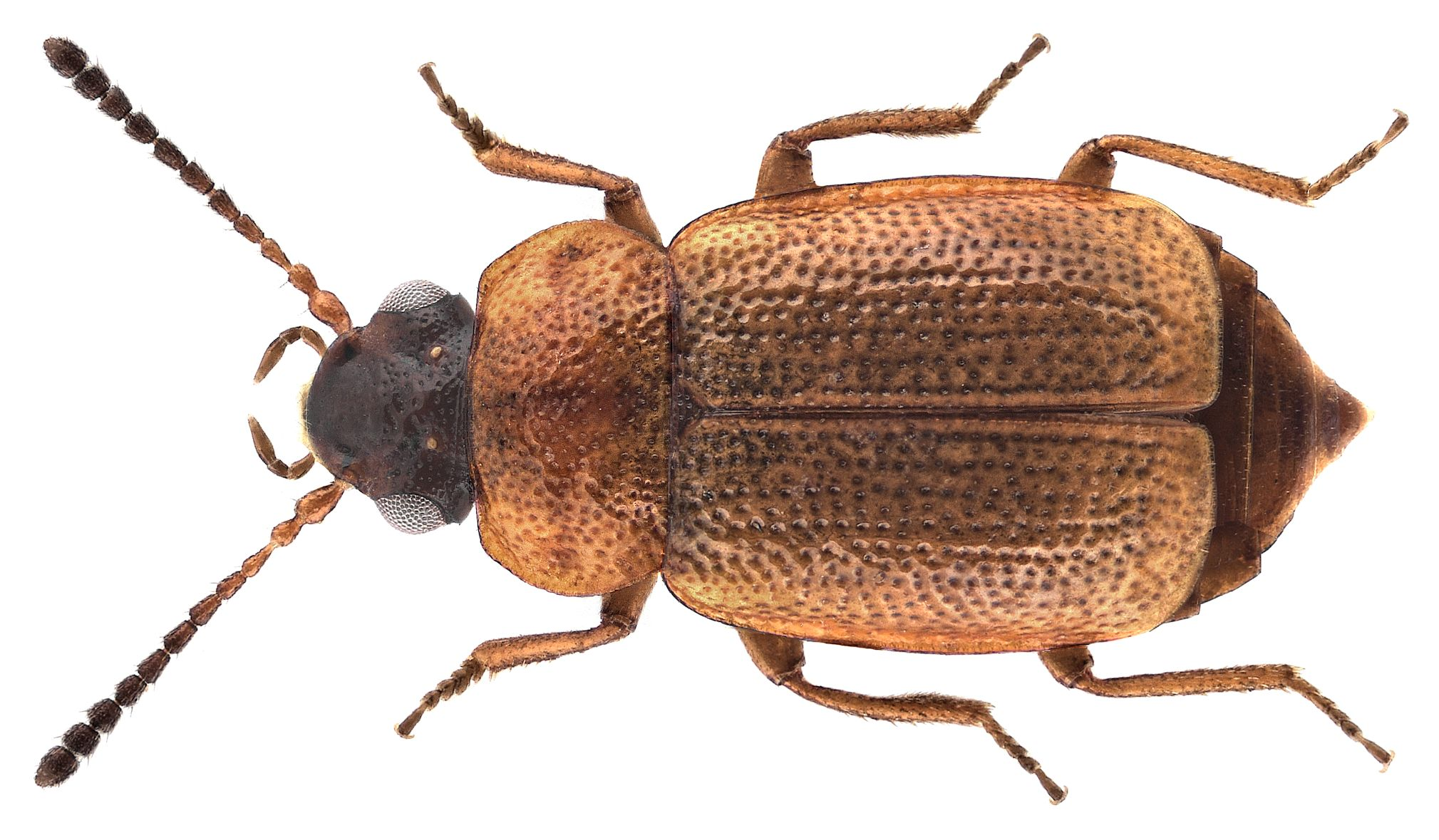
- Anthobium atrocephalum 3-3,5 mm

Scientific classification
- Kingdom: Animalia
- Phylum: Arthropoda
- Class: Insecta
- Order: Coleoptera
- Suborder: Polyphaga
- Infraorder: Staphyliniformia
- Family: Staphylinidae
- Genus: Anthobium
- Species: A. atrocephalum

Binomial name
- Anthobium atrocephalum (Gyllenhal, 1827)

= Anthobium atrocephalum =

Species of beetle

Anthobium atrocephalum is a species of rove beetles native to Europe.
