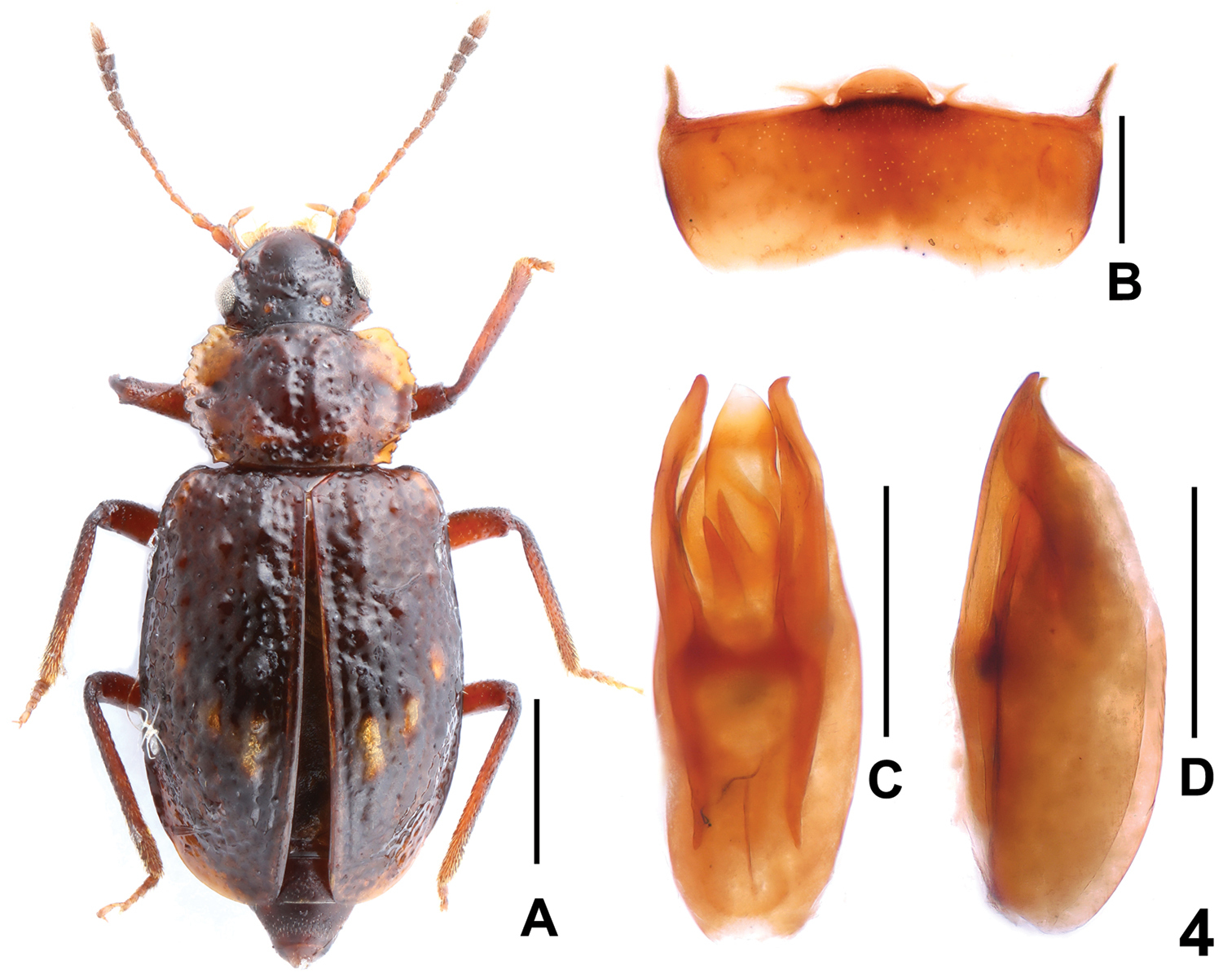
- Deinopteroloma spinigerum from China

Scientific classification
- Kingdom: Animalia
- Phylum: Arthropoda
- Clade: Pancrustacea
- Class: Insecta
- Order: Coleoptera
- Suborder: Polyphaga
- Infraorder: Staphyliniformia
- Family: Staphylinidae
- Tribe: Anthophagini
- Genus: Deinopteroloma; Jansson, 1946

= Deinopteroloma =

Genus of beetles

Deinopteroloma is a genus of beetles in the family Staphylinidae. They occur in both western North America and in East, Southeast, and South Asia.

Deinopteroloma measure 3–5.4 mm (0.12–0.21 in) in length.

== Species ==
There are 28 recognized species:

- Deinopteroloma bisbisinuatum Smetana & Shavrin, 2016
- Deinopteroloma chiangi Smetana, 1990
- Deinopteroloma crenatum Smetana, 1985
- Deinopteroloma cristatum Smetana, 1986
- Deinopteroloma diabolicum Jansson, A., 1946
- Deinopteroloma dispar Assing, 2015
- Deinopteroloma draco Shavrin & Smetana, 2016
- Deinopteroloma egregium Smetana, 1985
- Deinopteroloma emeicola Shavrin & Smetana, 2016
- Deinopteroloma gracile Smetana, 2001
- Deinopteroloma hamatum Smetana, 1996
- Deinopteroloma insigne Smetana, 1985
- Deinopteroloma minor Shavrin & Smetana, 2016
- Deinopteroloma notabile (Cameron, 1941)
- Deinopteroloma obtortum Assing, 2015
- Deinopteroloma pictum (Fauvel, 1878)
- Deinopteroloma rougemonti Smetana & Shavrin, 2016
- Deinopteroloma ruzickai Shavrin & Smetana, 2016
- Deinopteroloma semiflavum Jansson, A., 1946
- Deinopteroloma sextuberculatum Smetana & Shavrin, 2016
- Deinopteroloma songi Peng, Zhong & Li-Zhen Li, 2019
- Deinopteroloma spectabile Smetana, 1985
- Deinopteroloma spinigerum Peng, Zhong & Li-Zhen Li, 2019
- Deinopteroloma subcostatum (Mäklin, 1852)
- Deinopteroloma tricuspidatum Smetana, 1996
- Deinopteroloma uncinatum Assing, 2015
- Deinopteroloma vesiculosum Shavrin & Smetana, 2016
- Deinopteroloma yinyang Shavrin & Smetana, 2016
