= Corneolabiini =

Scientific classification
- Kingdom: Animalia
- Phylum: Arthropoda
- Clade: Pancrustacea
- Class: Insecta
- Order: Coleoptera
- Suborder: Polyphaga
- Infraorder: Staphyliniformia
- Family: Staphylinidae
- Subfamily: Omaliinae
- Tribe: Corneolabiini; Steel, 1950

Corneolabiini is a tribe of rove beetles in the subfamily Omaliinae. It was first described by Steel in 1950. It contains 3 genera and 24 species. Recorded observations of members of Corneolabiini have been made in New Zealand, Chile, and Australia.

== Genera ==
- Corneolabium
- Metacorneolabium
- Paracorneolabium
