= Hadrognathini =

Scientific classification
- Kingdom: Animalia
- Phylum: Arthropoda
- Clade: Pancrustacea
- Class: Insecta
- Order: Coleoptera
- Suborder: Polyphaga
- Infraorder: Staphyliniformia
- Family: Staphylinidae
- Subfamily: Omaliinae
- Tribe: Hadrognathini; Portevin, 1929

Tribe of beetles

Hadrognathini is a tribe of rove beetles in the subfamily Omaliinae. It was first described by Portevin in 1929. It contains 2 genera and 3 species. The vast majority of recorded observations of members of Hadrognathini have taken place in the United Kingdom, although observations have also been made in France, Spain, and Austria.

== Genera and species ==
- Brachygnathellus loebli
- Hadrognathus
  - Hadrognathus cantabricus
  - Hadrognathus longipalpis
