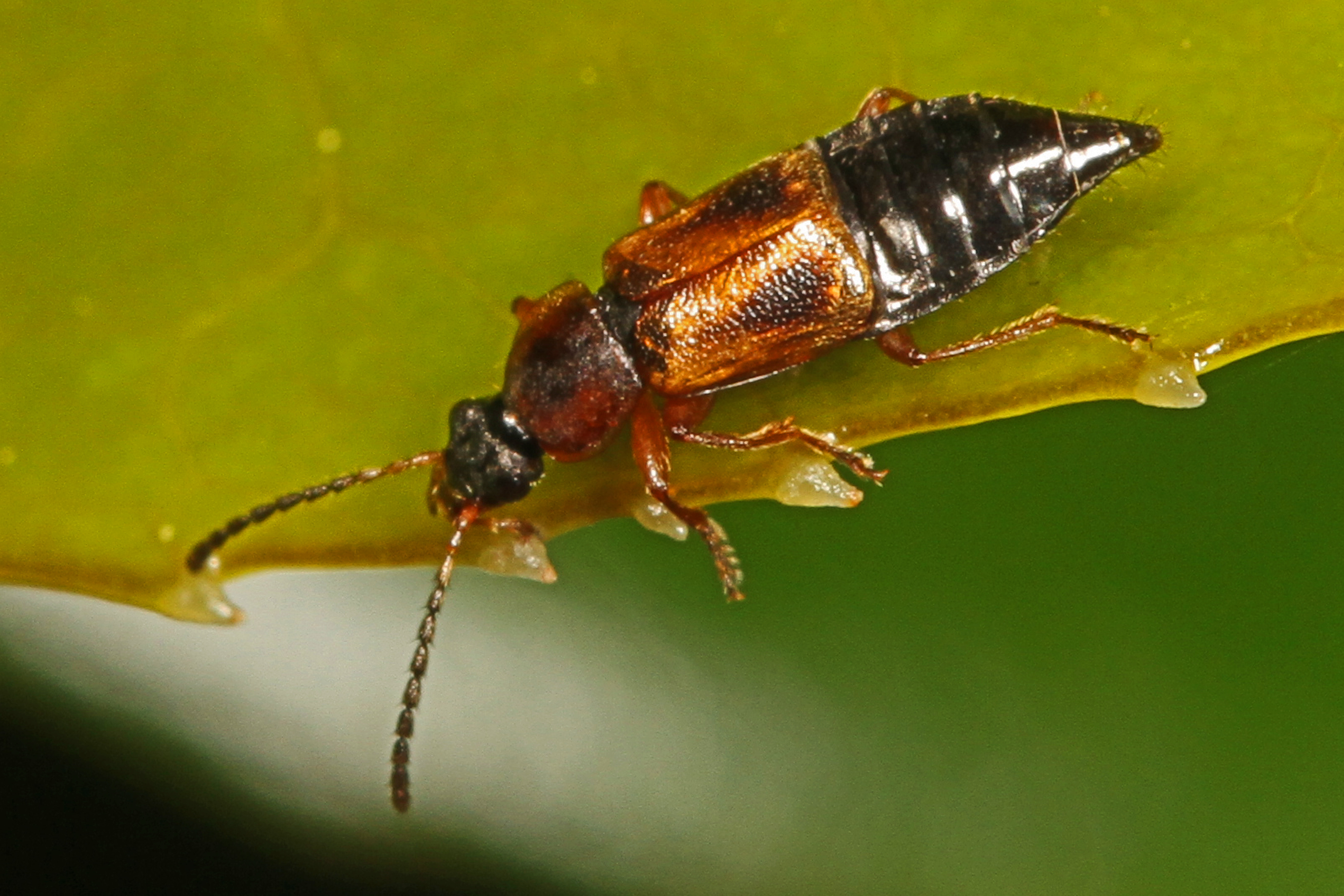

Scientific classification
- Kingdom: Animalia
- Phylum: Arthropoda
- Class: Insecta
- Order: Coleoptera
- Suborder: Polyphaga
- Infraorder: Staphyliniformia
- Family: Staphylinidae
- Tribe: Anthophagini
- Genus: Pelecomalium; Casey, 1886

= Pelecomalium =

Genus of beetles

Pelecomalium is a genus of ocellate rove beetles in the family Staphylinidae. There are at least three described species in Pelecomalium.

== Species ==
These three species belong to the genus Pelecomalium:

- Pelecomalium laevicolle (LeConte, 1866)^{g}
- Pelecomalium puberulum (Fauvel, 1878)^{g}
- Pelecomalium testaceum (Mannerheim, 1843)^{g}

Data sources: i = ITIS, c = Catalogue of Life, g = GBIF, b = Bugguide.net
