= Aphaenostemmini =

Scientific classification
- Kingdom: Animalia
- Phylum: Arthropoda
- Clade: Pancrustacea
- Class: Insecta
- Order: Coleoptera
- Suborder: Polyphaga
- Infraorder: Staphyliniformia
- Family: Staphylinidae
- Subfamily: Omaliinae
- Tribe: Aphaenostemmini; Peyerimhoff, 1914

Tribe of rove beetles

Aphaenostemmini is a tribe of rove beetles in the subfamily Omaliinae. It was first described by Henri de Peyerimhoff in 1914. It contains 2 genera and 12 species.

== Genera and species ==
- Aphaenostemmus
  - Aphaenostemmus associatus
  - Aphaenostemmus bordei
  - Aphaenostemmus distortus
  - Aphaenostemmus himalayicus
  - Aphaenostemmus indicus
  - Aphaenostemmus rhodicus
  - Aphaenostemmus testaceus
- Giulianium
  - Giulianium alaskanum
  - Giulianium campbelli
  - Giulianium koreanum
  - Giulianium newtoni
  - Giulianium tomokoae
