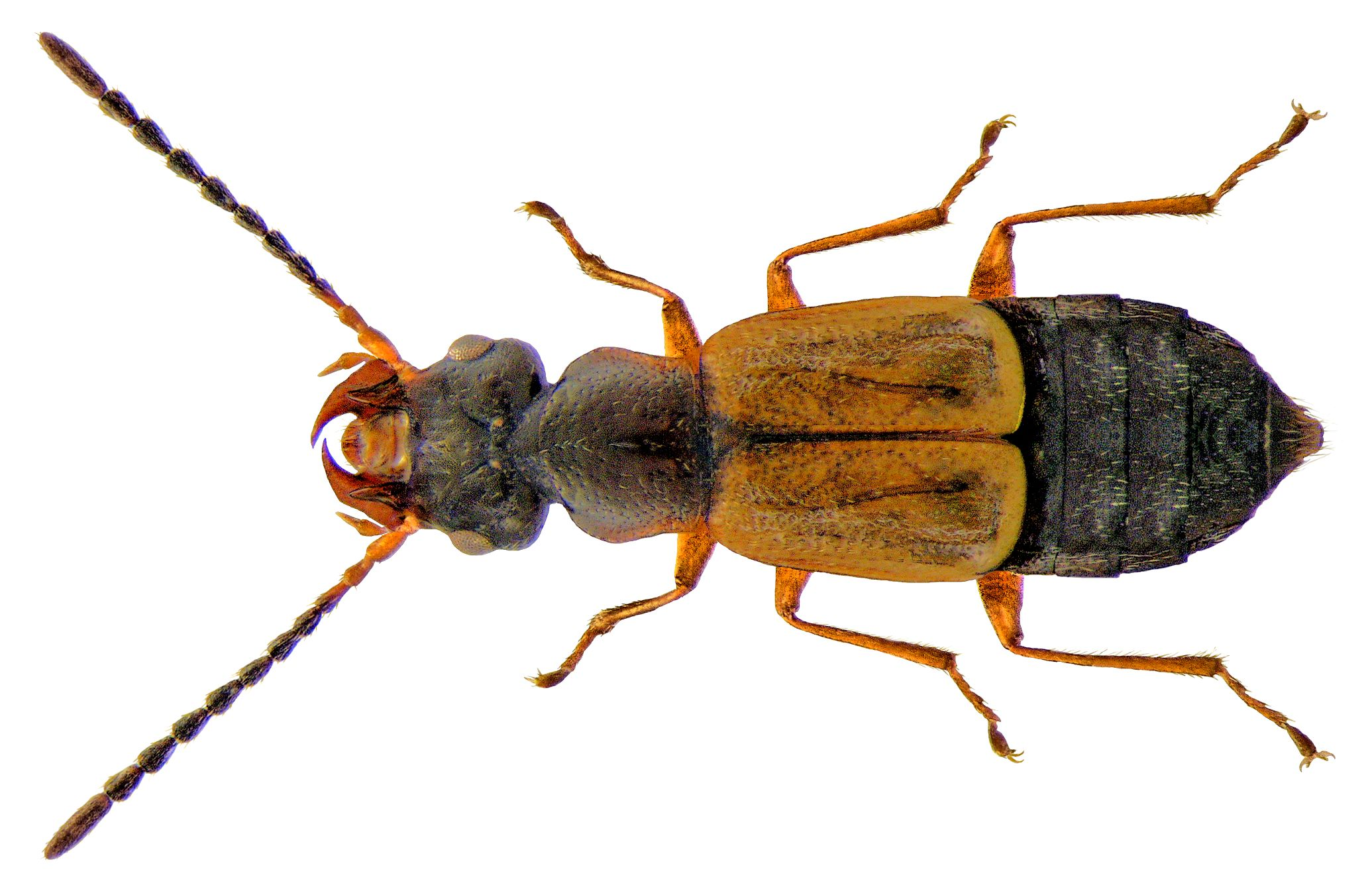
- Anthophagus alpinus 3-4 mm

Scientific classification
- Kingdom: Animalia
- Phylum: Arthropoda
- Clade: Pancrustacea
- Class: Insecta
- Order: Coleoptera
- Suborder: Polyphaga
- Infraorder: Staphyliniformia
- Superfamily: Staphylinoidea
- Family: Staphylinidae
- Genus: Anthophagus
- Species: A. alpinus

Binomial name
- Anthophagus alpinus (Paykull, 1790)

Synonyms
- Anthophagus fischeri Havelka & R.Dvořák, 1953; Anthophagus paratus Havelka & R.Dvořák, 1953; Anthophagus pseudosudeticus C.Koch, 1934; Staphylinus alpinus Paykull, 1790

= Anthophagus alpinus =

Species of beetle

Anthophagus alpinus is a species of rove beetles native to Europe.
