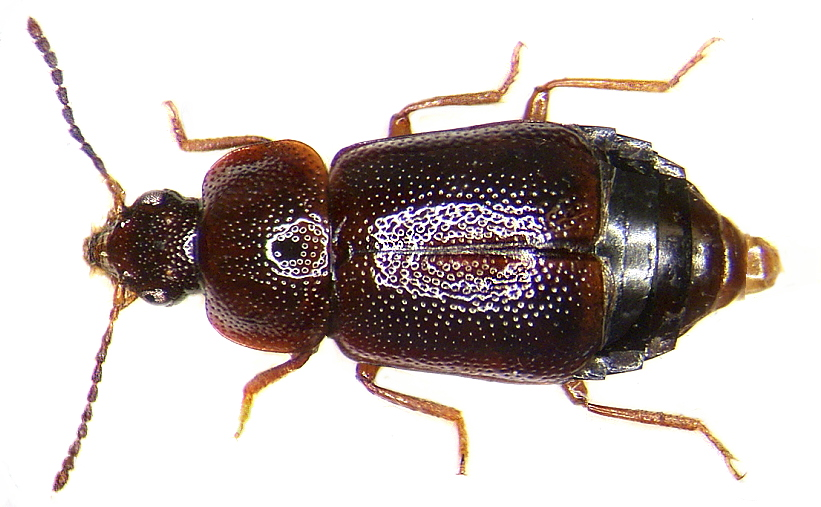

Scientific classification
- Kingdom: Animalia
- Phylum: Arthropoda
- Class: Insecta
- Order: Coleoptera
- Suborder: Polyphaga
- Infraorder: Staphyliniformia
- Family: Staphylinidae
- Genus: Olophrum; Erichson, 1839

= Olophrum =

Genus of beetles

Olophrum is a genus of beetles belonging to the family Staphylinidae.

The species of this genus are found in Eurasia and North America.

Selected species:

- Olophrum aragatzense Iablokov-Khnzorian, 1962
- Olophrum arcanum Scudder, 1900
- Olophrum fuscum (Gravenhorst, 1806)
