= Empelinae =

Scientific classification
- Domain: Eukaryota
- Kingdom: Animalia
- Phylum: Arthropoda
- Class: Insecta
- Order: Coleoptera
- Suborder: Polyphaga
- Infraorder: Staphyliniformia
- Family: Staphylinidae
- Subfamily: Empelinae; Newton & Thayer, 1992

Subfamily of beetles

The Empelinae are a subfamily of rove beetles; their biology is virtually unknown. Their anatomy and ecology resemble many rove beetles.

== Ecology and anatomy ==
The Empelinae are small beetles under 2 mm long. They have 11 antennae with loose trisegmented clubs. Their elytra nearly cover the whole of their abdomen. The tarsi, according to scientists, is 5-5-5. Some scientists theorize this is a result of their secluded habitats - forest leaf litter, fungi, and moss at a stream's edge. This makes collecting the subfamily's species hard. Due to the seclusion of the Empelinae, like many rove beetles, (see Aleocharinae), the subfamily's biology is nearly unknown.

== Systematics ==
The subfamily is small, with its type genus being monotypic; the only species is Empelus brunipennis, discovered Mannerheim in 1852. One species in the subfamily is restricted to North America. However, it has been very successful there, ranging from southern Alaska to California.
