= Eudectus =

Scientific classification
- Domain: Eukaryota
- Kingdom: Animalia
- Phylum: Arthropoda
- Class: Insecta
- Order: Coleoptera
- Suborder: Polyphaga
- Infraorder: Staphyliniformia
- Family: Staphylinidae
- Genus: Eudectus; Redtenbacher, 1857

Genus of beetles

Eudectus is a genus of beetles belonging to the family Staphylinidae.

The species of this genus are found in Europe and Japan.

Species:

- Eudectus altaiensis Zerche, 1990
- Eudectus crassicornis LeConte, 1884
