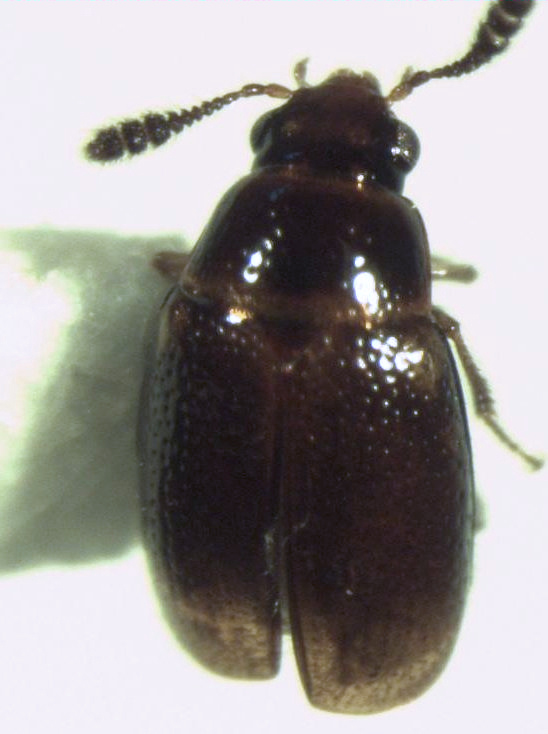

Scientific classification
- Kingdom: Animalia
- Phylum: Arthropoda
- Clade: Pancrustacea
- Class: Insecta
- Order: Coleoptera
- Suborder: Polyphaga
- Infraorder: Staphyliniformia
- Family: Staphylinidae
- Subfamily: Microsilphinae; Crownson, 1950
- Genus: Microsilpha; Broun, 1886

= Microsilpha =

Microsilphinae is a subfamily of rove beetles. It was described in 1950 by Crowson. It consists of one genus, Microsilpha, which has 4 accepted species. Species have been found in the southern hemisphere.

== Species ==
- Microsilpha argentina
- Microsilpha litorea
- Microsilpha ocelligera
- Microsilpha topali
