= Coryphium =

Scientific classification
- Kingdom: Animalia
- Phylum: Arthropoda
- Class: Insecta
- Order: Coleoptera
- Suborder: Polyphaga
- Infraorder: Staphyliniformia
- Family: Staphylinidae
- Genus: Coryphium; Stephens, 1834

Genus of beetles

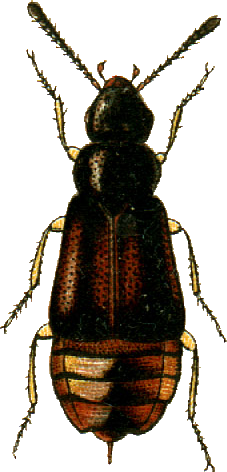

Coryphium is a genus of beetles belonging to the family Staphylinidae.

The species of this genus are found in Europe and Northern America.

Species:

- Coryphium angusticolle Stephens, 1834
- Coryphium arizonense (Bernhauer, 1912)
