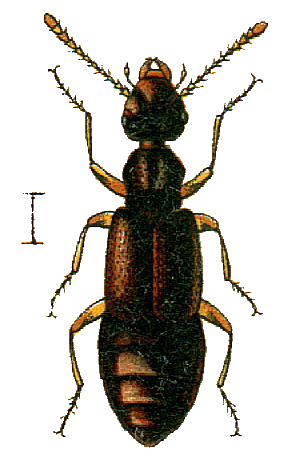
- Boreaphilus velox, c.1905-1915

Scientific classification
- Domain: Eukaryota
- Kingdom: Animalia
- Phylum: Arthropoda
- Class: Insecta
- Order: Coleoptera
- Suborder: Polyphaga
- Infraorder: Staphyliniformia
- Family: Staphylinidae
- Genus: Boreaphilus; Sahlberg, 1832

= Boreaphilus =

Genus of beetles

Boreaphilus is a genus of beetles belonging to the family Staphylinidae.

The species of this genus are found in Europe, Russia, Japan and Northern America.

Species:

- Boreaphilus albanicus Zerche, 1990
- Boreaphilus astur Sharp, 1873
