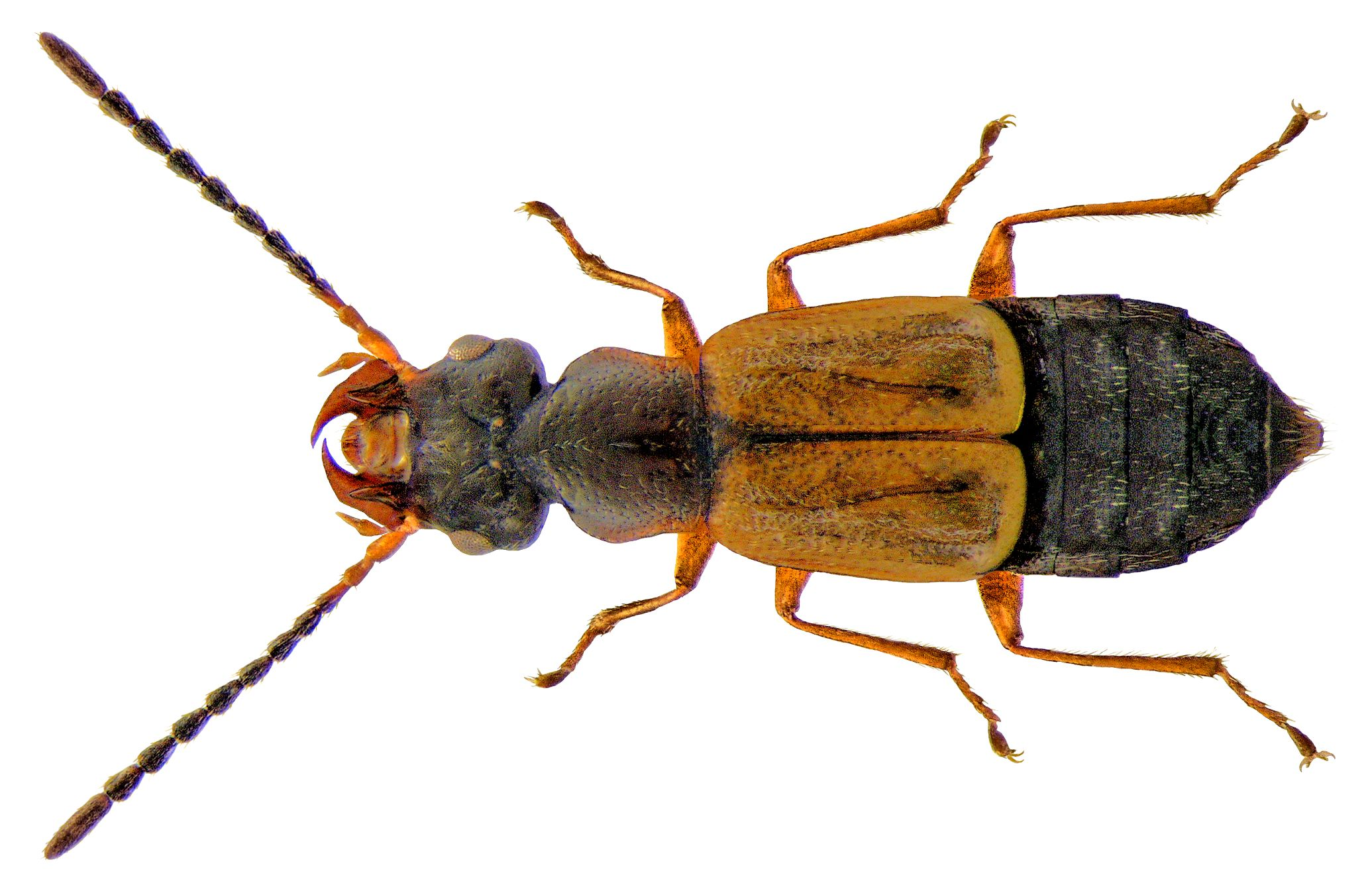
- Anthophagus alpinus, Austria

Scientific classification
- Domain: Eukaryota
- Kingdom: Animalia
- Phylum: Arthropoda
- Class: Insecta
- Order: Coleoptera
- Suborder: Polyphaga
- Infraorder: Staphyliniformia
- Superfamily: Staphylinoidea
- Family: Staphylinidae
- Genus: Anthophagus; Gravenhorst, 1802

Subgenera
- Anthophagus; Dimorphoschelus Blackwelder, 1952; Phaganthus Mulsant & Rey, 1880

Synonyms
- Dimorphoschelus Koch, 1933; Phaganthus Mulsant & Rey, 1880; Plaganthus Tottenham, 1945

= Anthophagus =

Genus of beetles

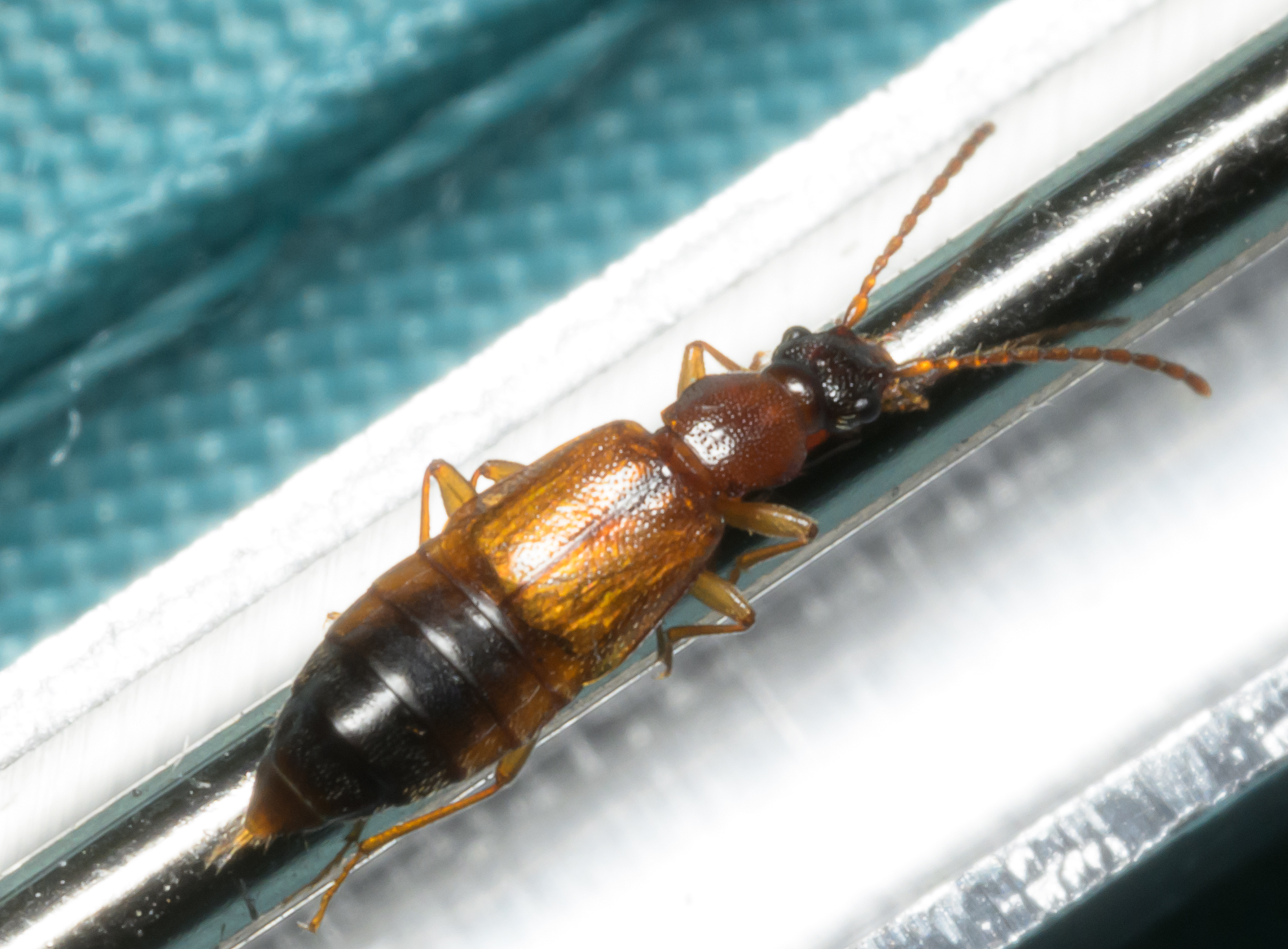
Anthophagus caraboides, Sweden

Anthophagus alpinus is a species of rove beetle in the family Staphylinidae, There are more than 30 described species in Anthophagus, found in the Palearctic and North America.

== Species ==
These 37 species belong to the genus Anthophagus:

- Anthophagus advena Gistel, 1857
- Anthophagus aeneicollis Fauvel, 1873
- Anthophagus alpestris Heer, 1839
- Anthophagus alpinus (Paykull, 1790)
- Anthophagus angusticollis (Mannerheim, 1830)
- Anthophagus apenninus Baudi di Selve, 1870
- Anthophagus apfelbecki Bernhauer, 1914
- Anthophagus baikalensis Iablokov-Khnzorian, 1974
- Anthophagus bellicanus Gistel, 1857
- Anthophagus bicolor Grimmer, 1841
- Anthophagus bicornis (Block, 1799)
- Anthophagus caraboides (Linnaeus, 1758)
- Anthophagus durmitorensis Coiffait, 1980
- Anthophagus fallax Kiesenwetter, 1848
- Anthophagus fauveli Luze, 1902
- Anthophagus forticornis Kiesenwetter, 1846
- Anthophagus hanfii Gistel, 1857
- Anthophagus hummleri Bernhauer, 1912
- Anthophagus ilgazicus Coiffait, 1981
- Anthophagus melanocephalus Heer, 1839
- Anthophagus muticus Kiesenwetter, 1850
- Anthophagus nigrifrons Grimmer, 1841
- Anthophagus noricus Ganglbauer, 1895
- Anthophagus omalinus Zetterstedt, 1828
- Anthophagus praeustus P.W.J.Müller, 1821
- Anthophagus rotundicollis Heer, 1839
- Anthophagus schatzmayri C.Koch, 1933
- Anthophagus schneideri Eppelsheim, 1878
- Anthophagus scutellaris Erichson, 1840
- Anthophagus spectabilis Heer, 1839
- Anthophagus sudeticus Kiesenwetter, 1846
- Anthophagus torretassoi C.Koch, 1933
- Anthophagus transversus Motschulsky, 1858
- Anthophagus variegatas Gistel, 1857
- Anthophagus vehemans Gistel, 1857
- Anthophagus vehemens Gistel, 1857
- † Anthophagus giebeli Heyden, C. & L. Heyden, 1866
