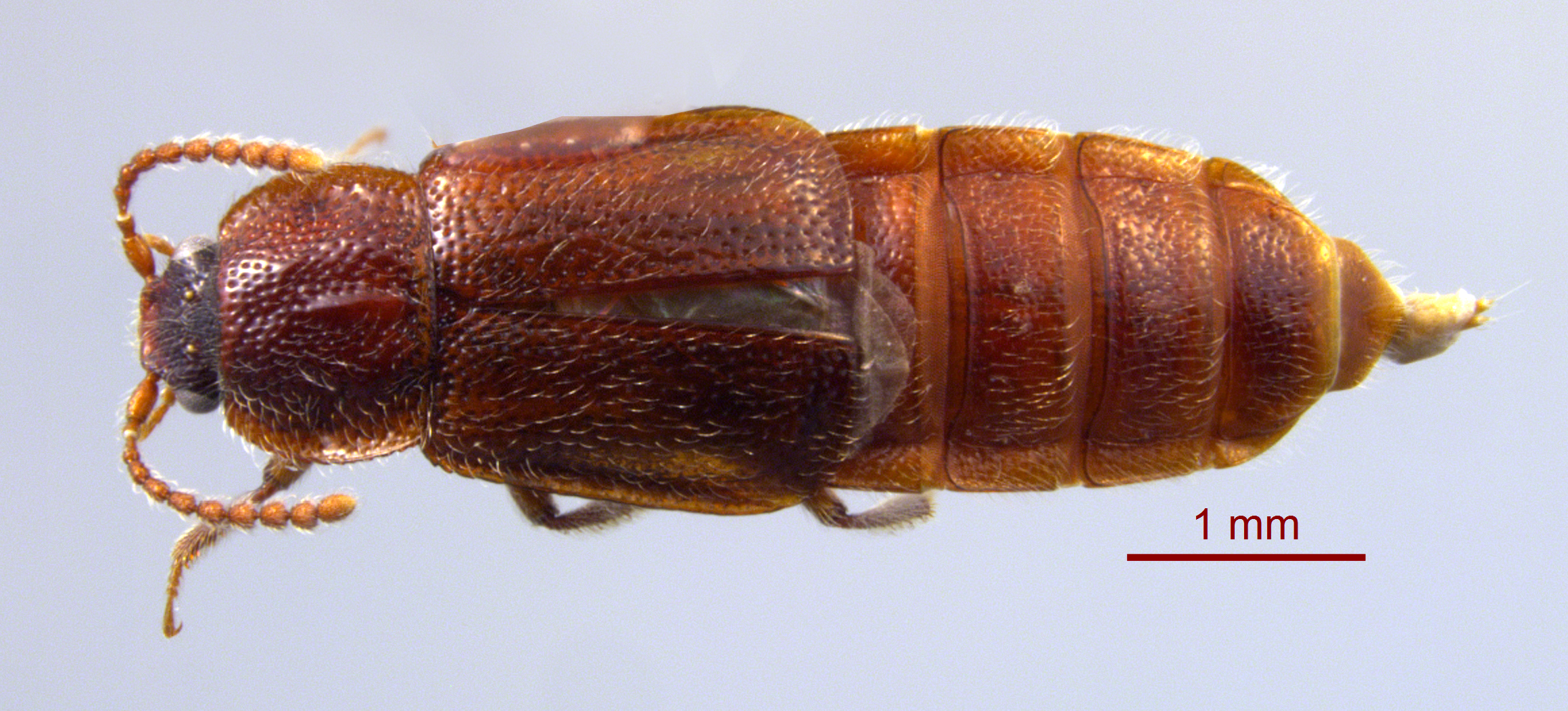
- Acidota subcarinata

Scientific classification
- Kingdom: Animalia
- Phylum: Arthropoda
- Class: Insecta
- Order: Coleoptera
- Suborder: Polyphaga
- Infraorder: Staphyliniformia
- Family: Staphylinidae
- Subfamily: Omaliinae; MacLeay, 1825

= Omaliinae =

Subfamily of beetles

The Omaliinae are a subfamily of the Staphylinidae, rove beetles.

== Anatomy ==
Typical adults are 1.5 to 6 mm long, somewhat broader in shape than are most Staphylinidae, with somewhat longer elytra (without serial punctures), the head with a broad neck, the antennae which are only slightly broader at the apex, and tarsi of five articles. In almost all genera is a pair of ocelli near the base of the head, and in a few, the elytra cover the entire abdomen. The maxillary mala of larvae are strap-shaped, but not as long as in the Proteininae, and the mandible lacks a prostheca.

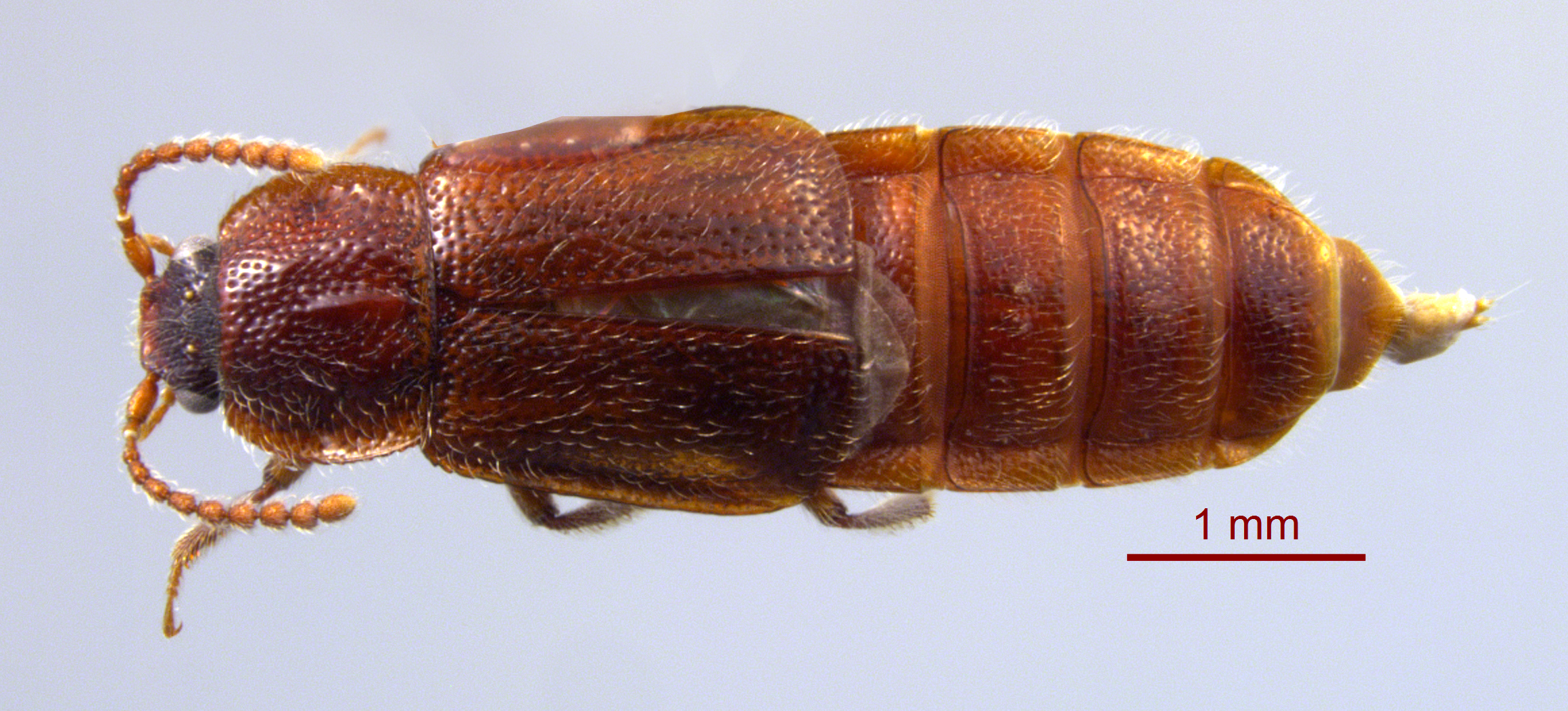
Acidota subcarinata

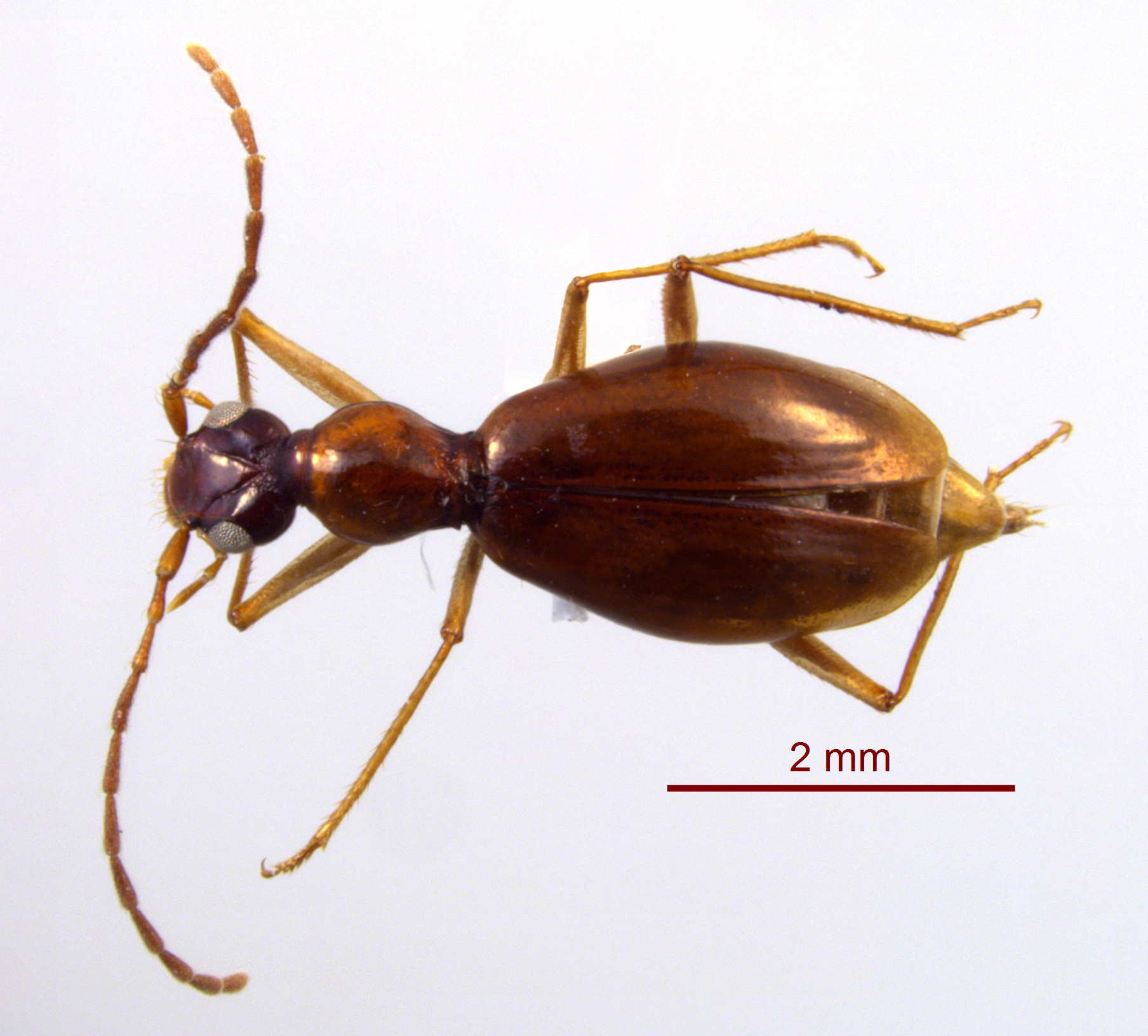
Brathinus nitidus

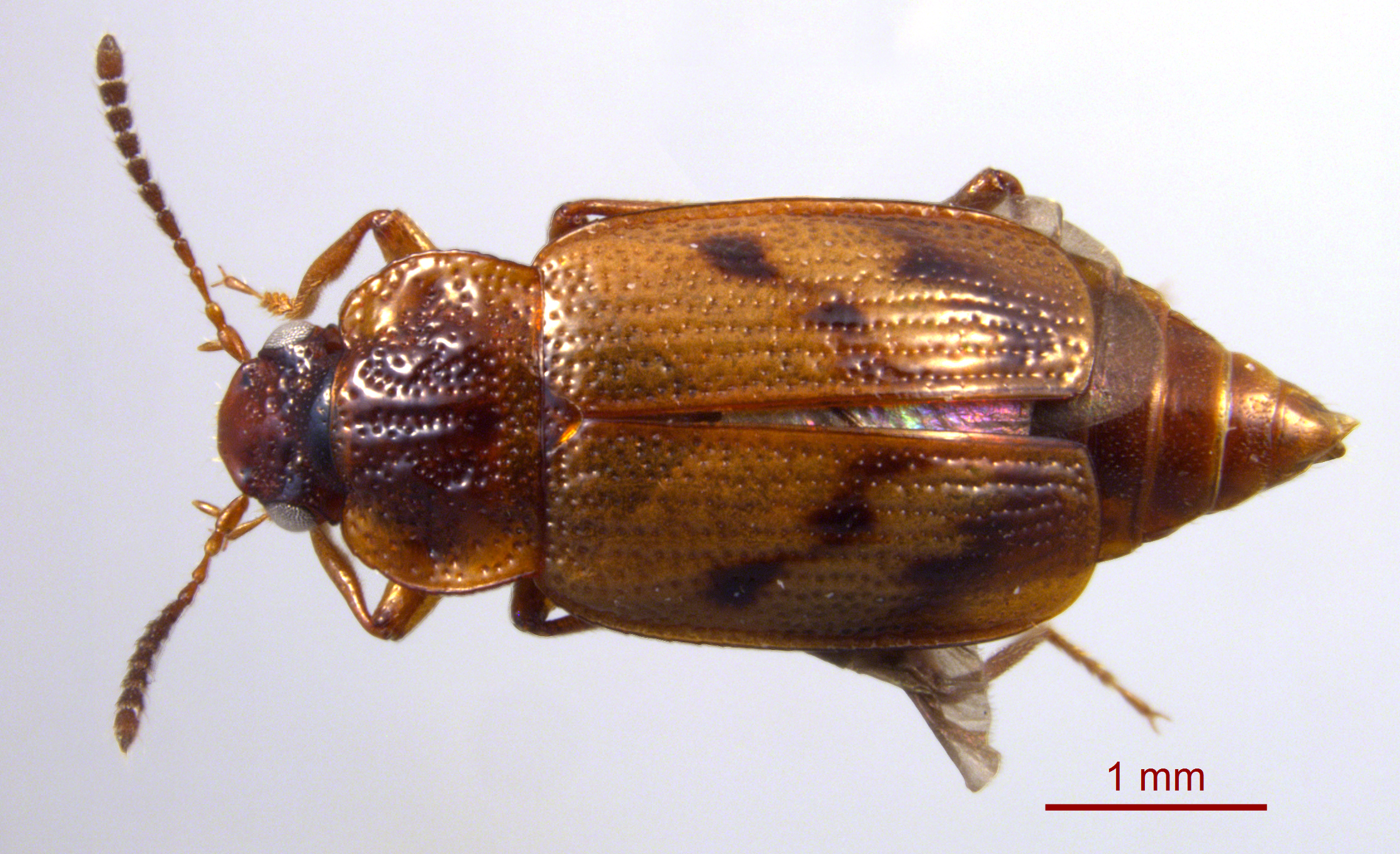
Deinopteroloma pictum

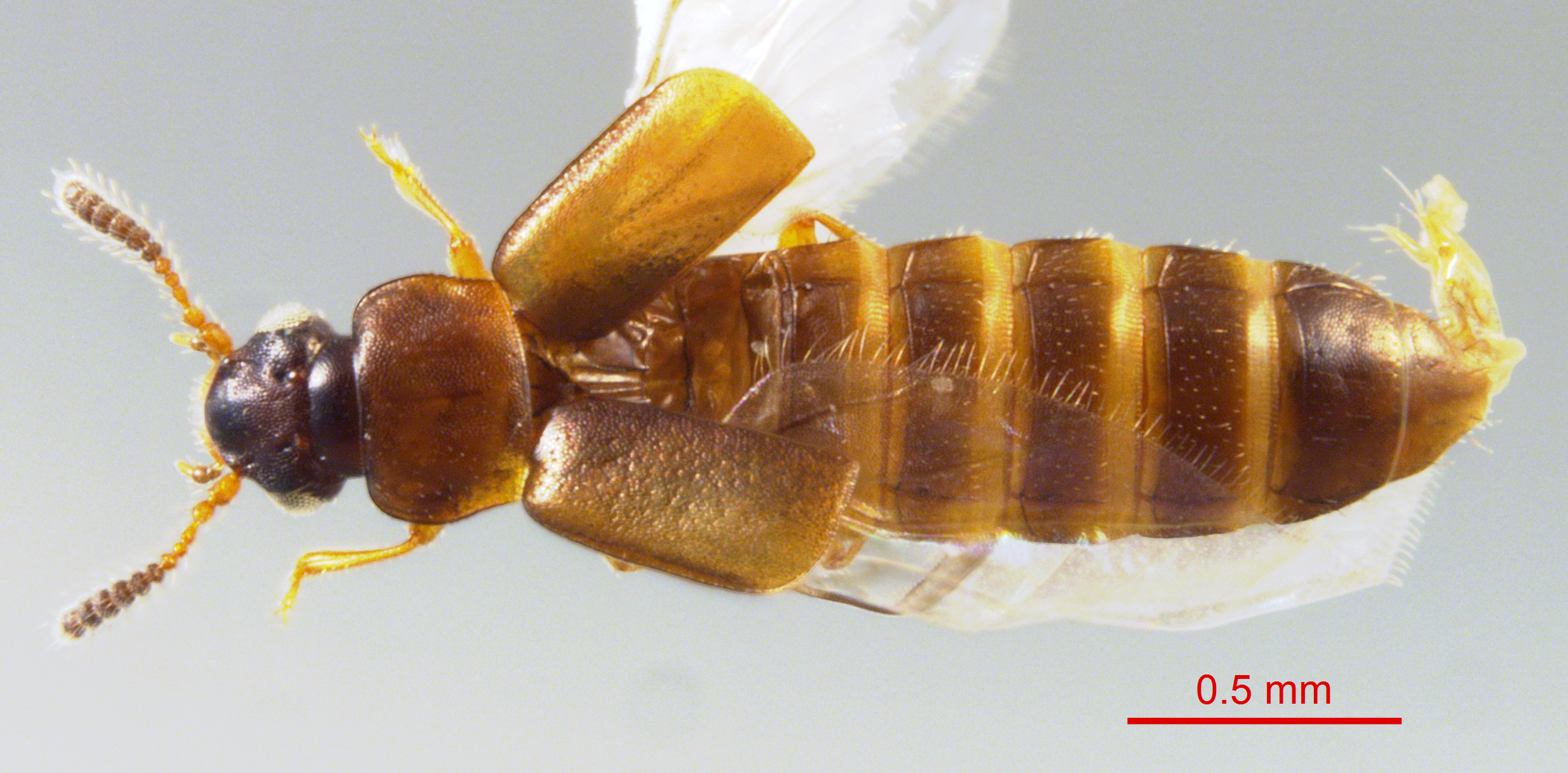
Phloeonomus laesicollis

== Ecology ==
Adults and larvae occur in leaf litter, decaying fruits, moss, and under bark of dead trees. Adults of several species and larvae of a few occur in flowers. Adults and larvae of many genera and species are believed to be predatory (they feed on freshly killed small insects), though a few seem to be phytophagous (they damage flowers) or saprophagous (they feed on decaying fruits).

== Systematics and evolution ==
The Omaliinae subfamily is large (comprising over 100 genera), and is divided into these seven tribes:

- Anthophagini
- Omaliini
- Eusphalerini
- Hadrognathini
- Corneolabiini
- Coryphiini
- Aphaenostemmini

In North America, 55 genera and more than 200 species are found.
