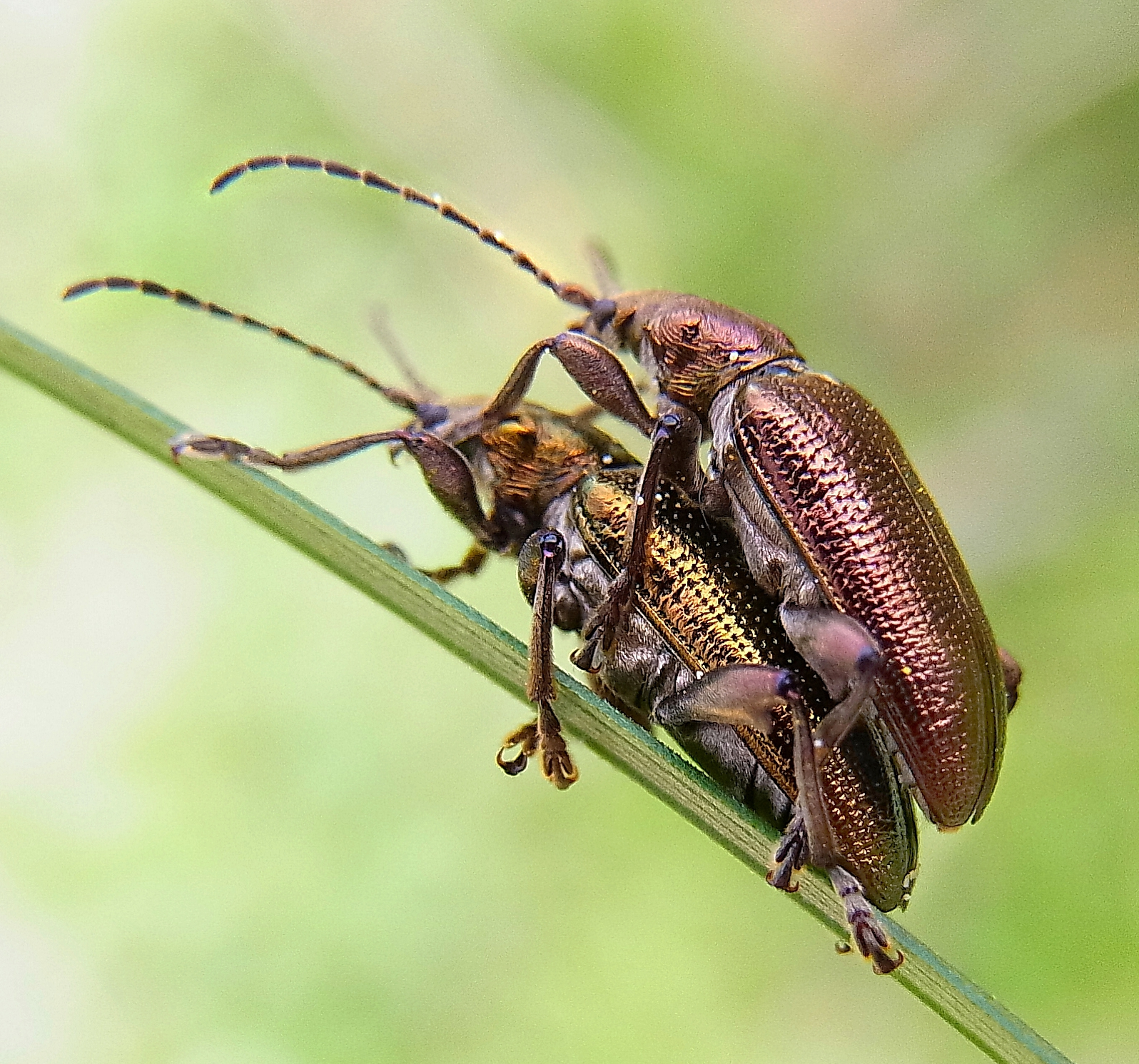
- Plateumaris sericea in copula

Scientific classification
- Kingdom: Animalia
- Phylum: Arthropoda
- Class: Insecta
- Order: Coleoptera
- Suborder: Polyphaga
- Infraorder: Cucujiformia
- Family: Chrysomelidae
- Genus: Plateumaris
- Species: P. sericea

Binomial name
- Plateumaris sericea (Linnaeus, 1758)

= Plateumaris sericea =

Species of beetle

Plateumaris sericea is a species of beetle in the family Chrysomelidae. It is found in the Palearctic.
