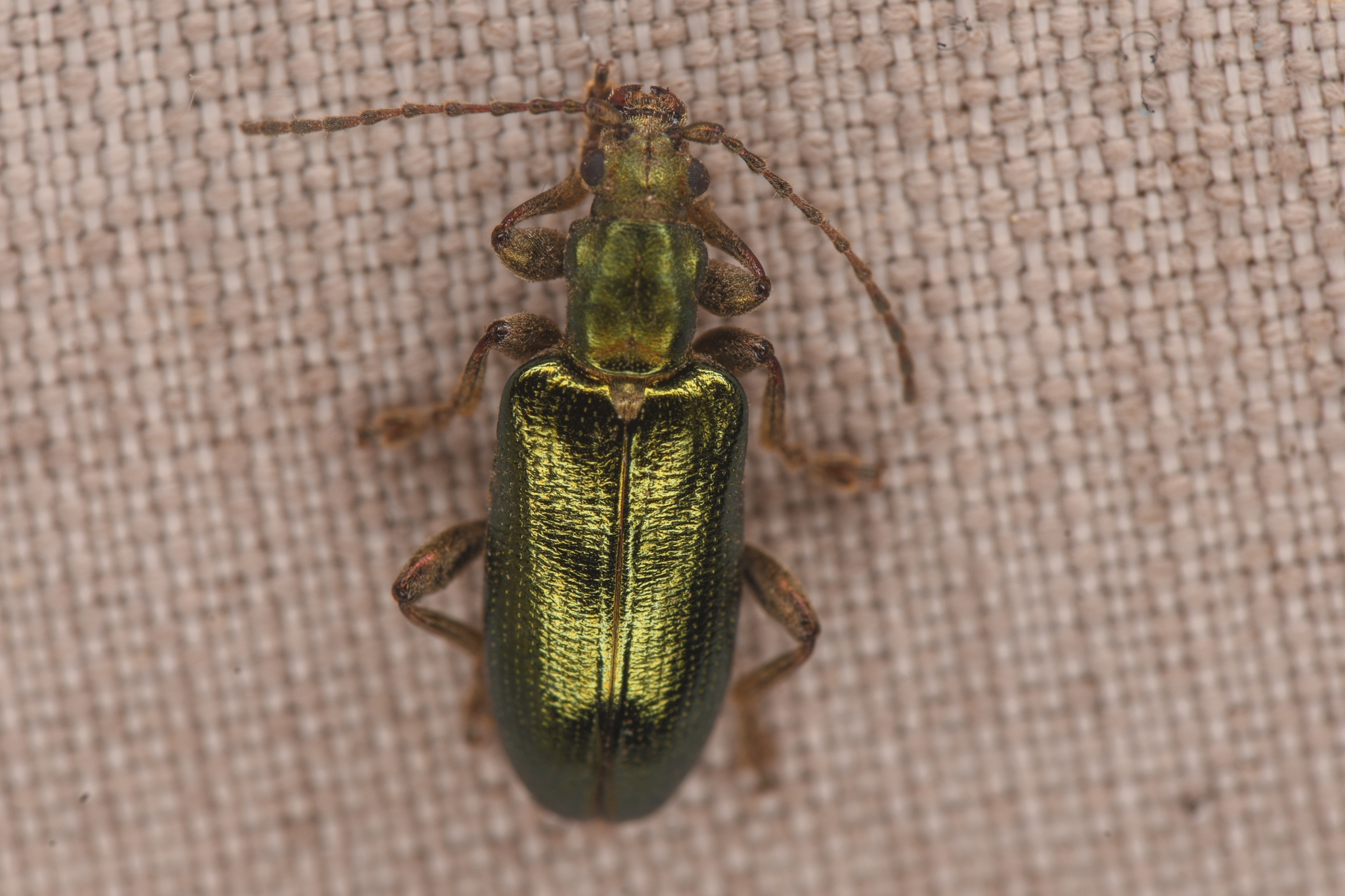

Scientific classification
- Kingdom: Animalia
- Phylum: Arthropoda
- Class: Insecta
- Order: Coleoptera
- Suborder: Polyphaga
- Infraorder: Cucujiformia
- Family: Chrysomelidae
- Genus: Plateumaris
- Species: P. neomexicana

Binomial name
- Plateumaris neomexicana (Schaeffer, 1925)

= Plateumaris neomexicana =

Species of beetle

Plateumaris neomexicana is a species in the subfamily Donaciinae ("aquatic leaf beetles"), in the suborder Polyphaga ("water, rove, scarab, long-horned, leaf and snout beetles"). It is found in North America.
