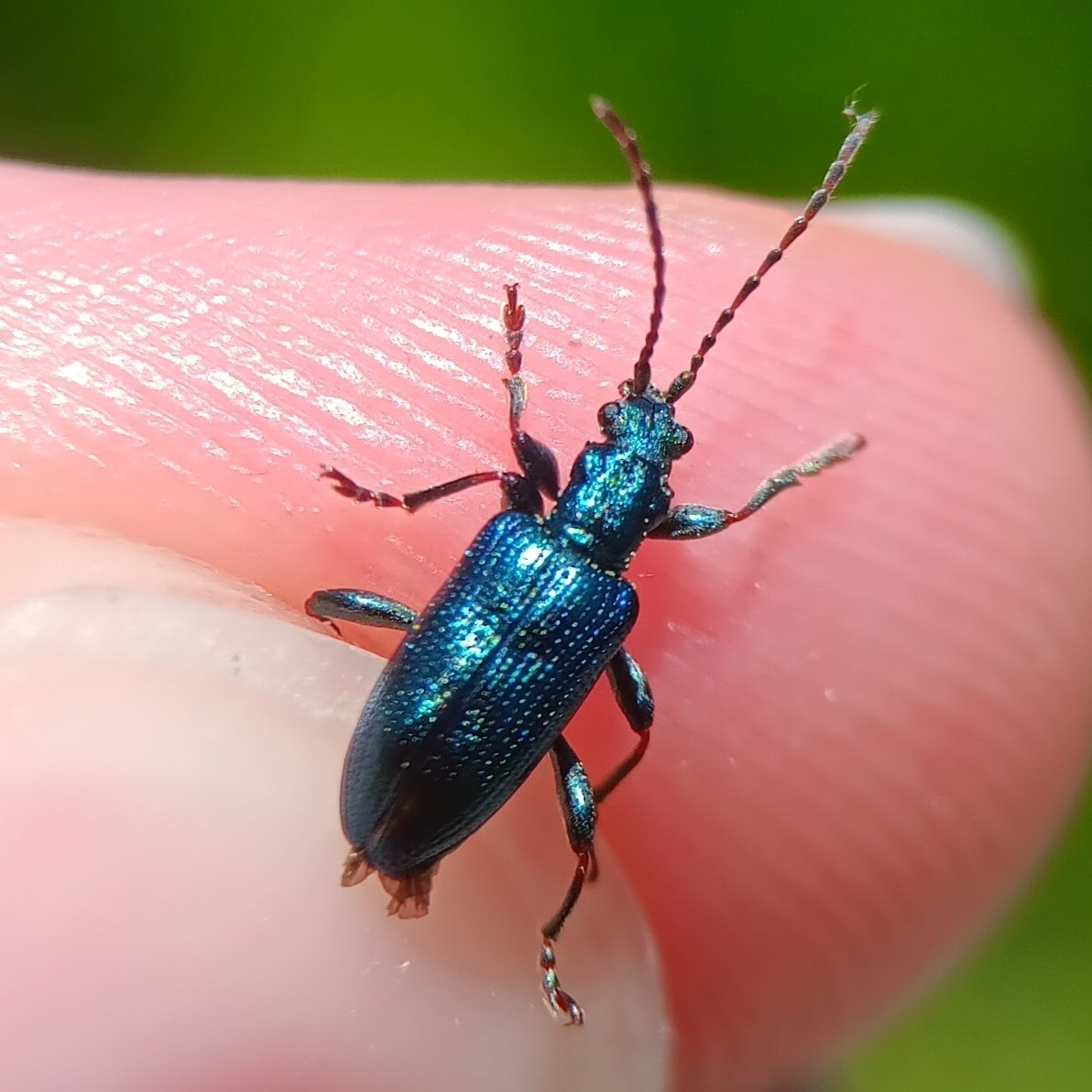

Scientific classification
- Kingdom: Animalia
- Phylum: Arthropoda
- Class: Insecta
- Order: Coleoptera
- Suborder: Polyphaga
- Infraorder: Cucujiformia
- Family: Chrysomelidae
- Genus: Plateumaris
- Species: P. frosti

Binomial name
- Plateumaris frosti (Schaeffer, 1935)

= Plateumaris frosti =

Species of beetle

Plateumaris frosti is a species of aquatic leaf beetle in the family Chrysomelidae. It is found in North America.
