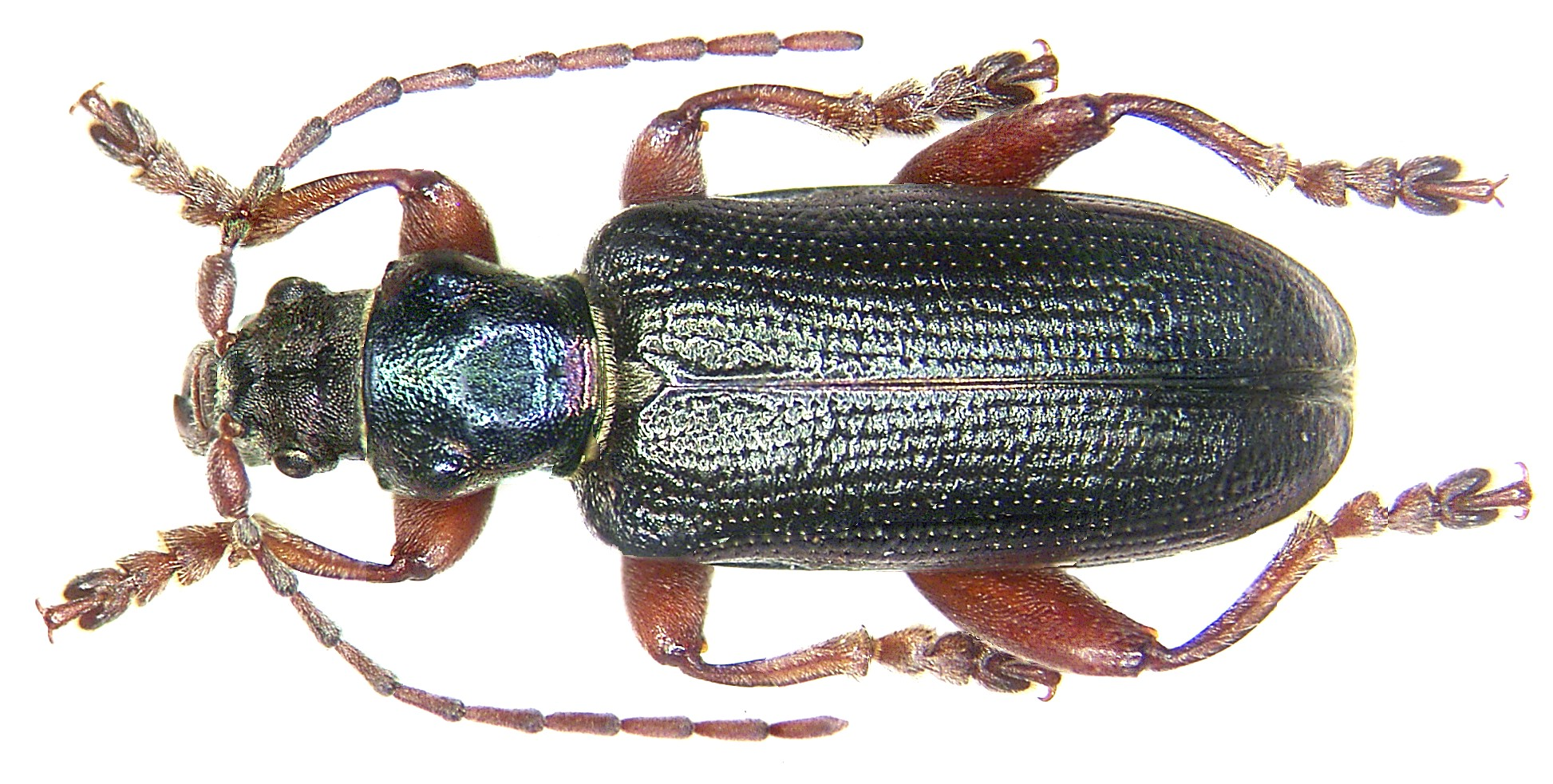
- Total length 8-11 mm

Scientific classification
- Kingdom: Animalia
- Phylum: Arthropoda
- Class: Insecta
- Order: Coleoptera
- Suborder: Polyphaga
- Infraorder: Cucujiformia
- Family: Chrysomelidae
- Genus: Plateumaris
- Species: P. bracata

Binomial name
- Plateumaris bracata (Scopoli, 1772)

= Plateumaris bracata =

Species of beetle

Plateumaris bracata is a species of leaf beetle from the Donaciinae subfamily which can be found in the western part of the Palearctic region, from Spain to Central Asia.
