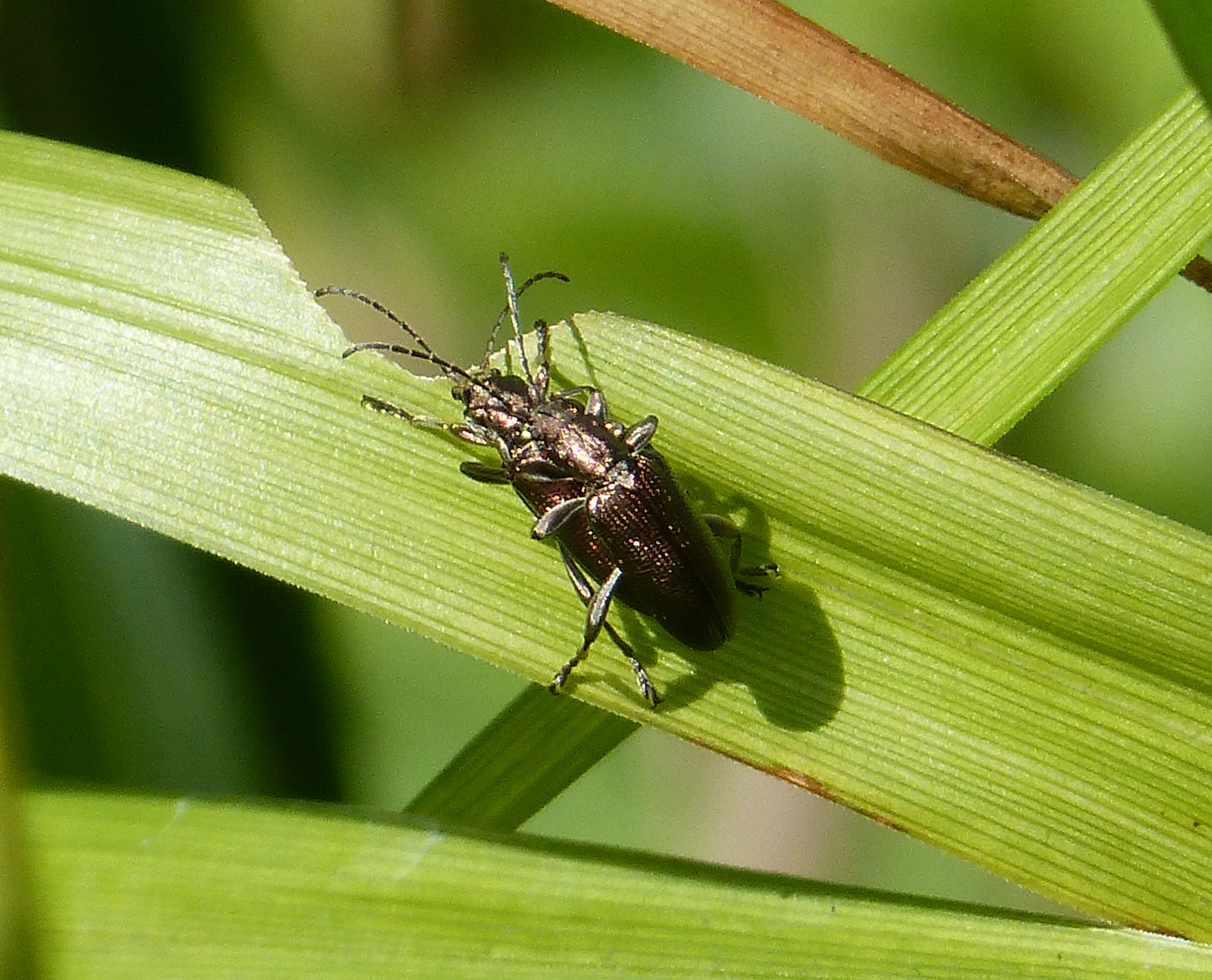

Scientific classification
- Kingdom: Animalia
- Phylum: Arthropoda
- Clade: Pancrustacea
- Class: Insecta
- Order: Coleoptera
- Suborder: Polyphaga
- Infraorder: Cucujiformia
- Family: Chrysomelidae
- Subfamily: Donaciinae
- Tribe: Plateumarini
- Genus: Plateumaris; Thomson, 1859

= Plateumaris =

Genus of beetles

Plateumaris is a genus of aquatic leaf beetles in the family Chrysomelidae, subfamily Donaciinae and is Holarctic in distribution. There are 17 described species in North America and 10 species in the Palaearctic Region.

== Description ==
Species of the genus Plateumaris are recognized by the lack of pubescence above the procoxa, rounded and declivous elytral apices with sutural area apically sinuate. Females have a strongly sclerotized ovipositor that looks like a pointed shovel, often protruding from the abdomen - hence the name “spade reed beetles”.

== Distribution and habitat ==
Adults are found along margins of water bodies on emergent aquatic plants, often in large numbers. Larvae and pupae are found attached to the roots of these plants.

== Species ==
The following species are recognised in the genus Plateumaris:

- Plateumaris aurifera (J. L. LeConte, 1850)
- Plateumaris balli Askevold, 1991
- Plateumaris bracata (Scopoli, 1772)
- Plateumaris consimilis (Schrank, 1781)
- Plateumaris diversa (Schaeffer, 1925)
- Plateumaris dubia (Schaeffer, 1925) - long-horned leaf beetle
- Plateumaris flavipes (Kirby, 1837)
- Plateumaris frosti (Schaeffer, 1935)
- Plateumaris fulvipes (Lacordaire, 1845)
- Plateumaris germari (Mannerheim, 1843)
- Plateumaris metallica (Ahrens, 1810)
- Plateumaris neomexicana (Schaeffer, 1925)
- Plateumaris nitida (Germar, 1811)
- Plateumaris notmani (Schaeffer, 1925)
- Plateumaris pusilla (Say, 1826)
- Plateumaris robusta (Schaeffer, 1920)
- Plateumaris rufa (Say, 1826)
- Plateumaris schaefferi Askevold, 1991
- Plateumaris sericea (Linnaeus, 1758)
- Plateumaris shoemakeri (Schaeffer, 1925)
