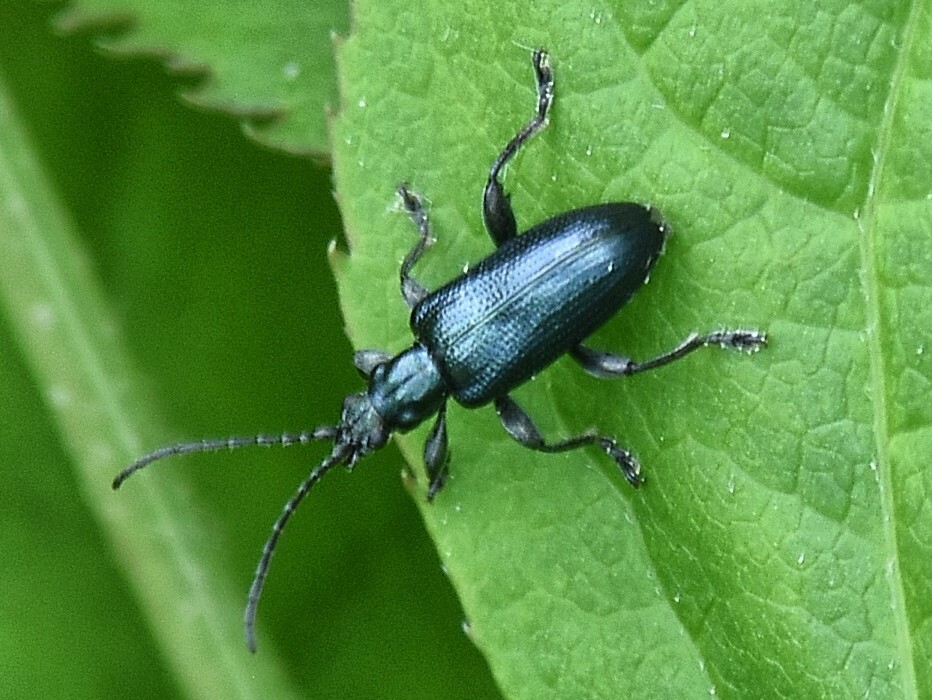

Scientific classification
- Kingdom: Animalia
- Phylum: Arthropoda
- Class: Insecta
- Order: Coleoptera
- Suborder: Polyphaga
- Infraorder: Cucujiformia
- Family: Chrysomelidae
- Genus: Plateumaris
- Species: P. nitida

Binomial name
- Plateumaris nitida (Germar, 1811)

Synonyms
- Donacia emarginata Kirby, 1837; Plateumaris emarginata (Kirby, 1837)

= Plateumaris nitida =

Species of beetle

Plateumaris nitida is a species of aquatic leaf beetle in the family Chrysomelidae. It is found in North America.

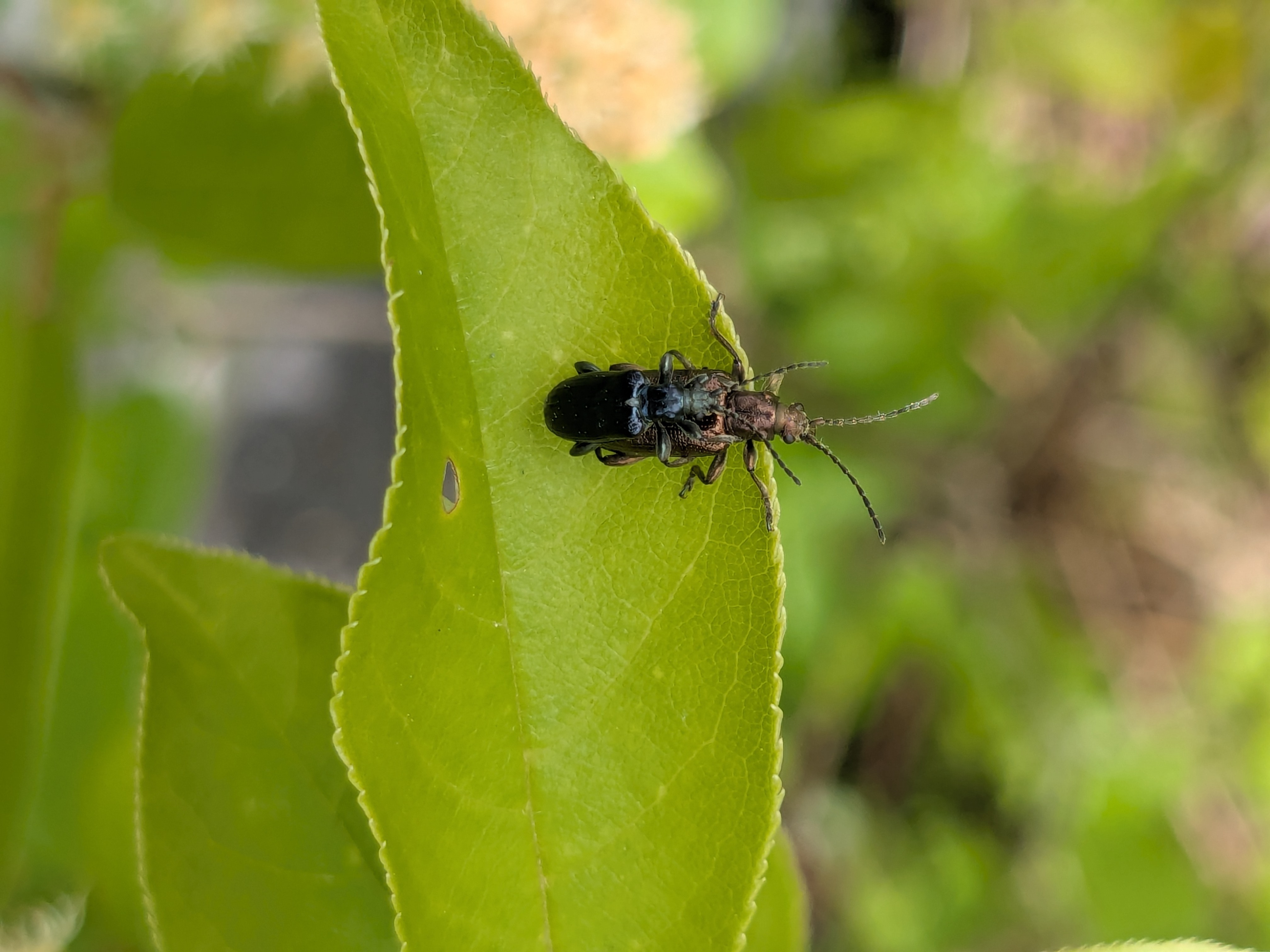
A mating pair in the species complex P. nitida clearly showing sexual dimorphism.
