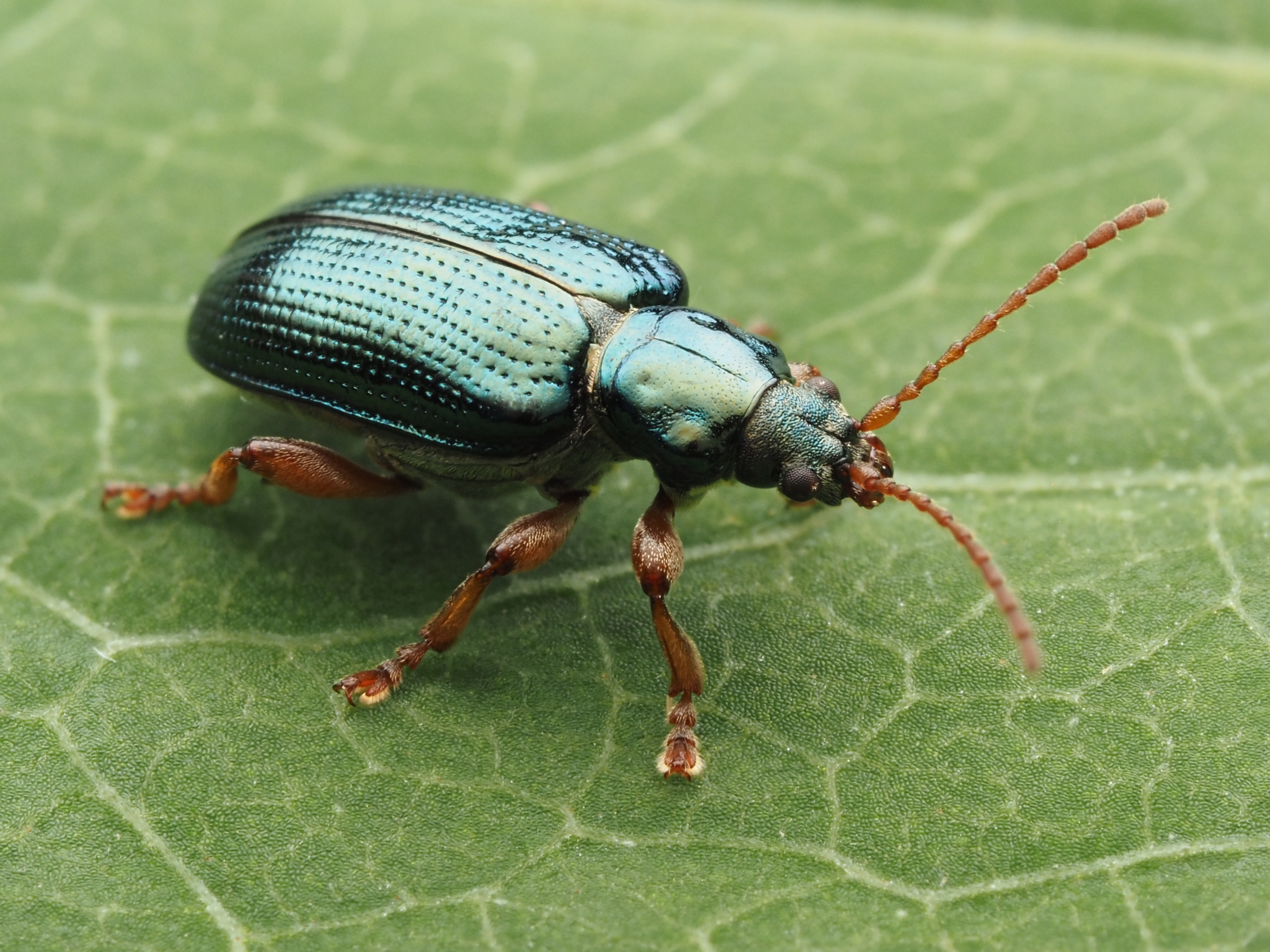

Scientific classification
- Kingdom: Animalia
- Phylum: Arthropoda
- Class: Insecta
- Order: Coleoptera
- Suborder: Polyphaga
- Infraorder: Cucujiformia
- Family: Chrysomelidae
- Genus: Plateumaris
- Species: P. rufa

Binomial name
- Plateumaris rufa (Say, 1826)

Synonyms
- Donacia rufa Say, 1826; Plateumaris chalcea (Lacordaire, 1845); Plateumaris sulcicollis (Lacordaire, 1845)

= Plateumaris rufa =

Species of beetle

Plateumaris rufa is a species of aquatic leaf beetle in the family Chrysomelidae. It is found in the eastern United States and Canada, from West Virginia north to Quebec. It was first described in 1826 by Thomas Say based on a specimen found on the bank of the Schuylkill River in Pennsylvania. The species has variable coloration. Although it is typically metallic reddish copper, it is sometimes blue, green, or rarely purple. Its appendages are rufous (reddish brown).
