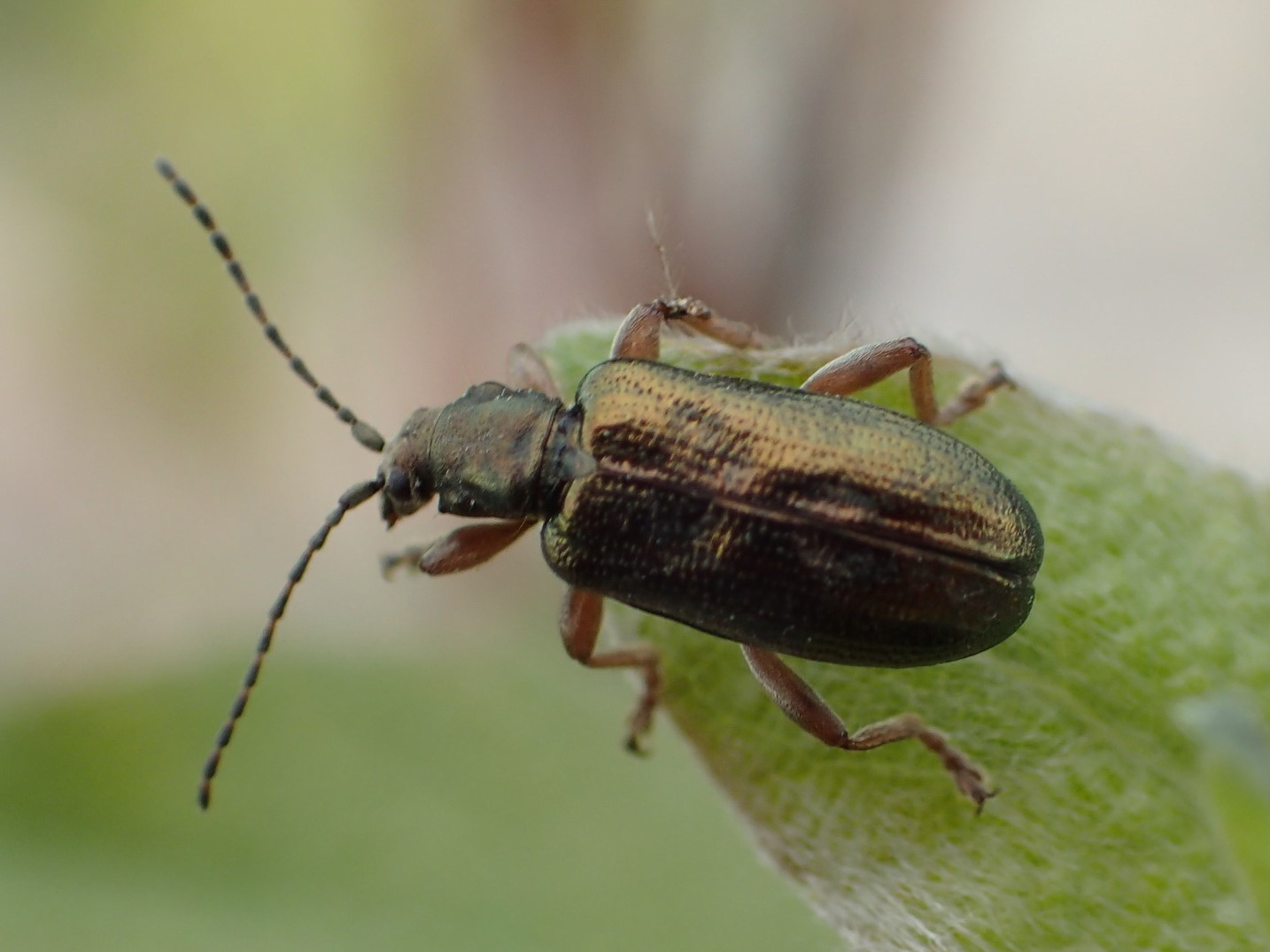

Scientific classification
- Kingdom: Animalia
- Phylum: Arthropoda
- Class: Insecta
- Order: Coleoptera
- Suborder: Polyphaga
- Infraorder: Cucujiformia
- Family: Chrysomelidae
- Genus: Plateumaris
- Species: P. germari

Binomial name
- Plateumaris germari (Mannerheim, 1843)

Synonyms
- Donacia germari Mannerheim, 1843; Donacia dives LeConte, 1851

= Plateumaris germari =

Species of beetle

Plateumaris germari is a species of aquatic leaf beetle in the family Chrysomelidae. It is found in western North America.
