= Trechiama =

Scientific classification
- Domain: Eukaryota
- Kingdom: Animalia
- Phylum: Arthropoda
- Class: Insecta
- Order: Coleoptera
- Suborder: Adephaga
- Family: Carabidae
- Subfamily: Trechinae
- Tribe: Trechini
- Subtribe: Trechina
- Genus: Trechiama; Jeannel, 1927

Subgenera
- Leptepaphiama Jeannel, 1962; Trechiama Jeannel, 1927

Genus of beetles

Trechiama is a genus in the beetle family Carabidae. There are more than 170 described species in Trechiama. Most are found in Japan, some in Taiwan.

== Species ==
These 176 species belong to the genus Trechiama:

- Trechiama abcuma Ueno, 1992 (Japan)
- Trechiama accipitris Ueno, 1983 (Japan)
- Trechiama acco Ueno, 1989 (Japan)
- Trechiama acutidens Ueno, 1986 (Japan)
- Trechiama advena Ueno, 1983 (Japan)
- Trechiama ajari Ashida, 2005 (Japan)
- Trechiama akinobui Ueno, 1986 (Japan)
- Trechiama akirakitayamai Ashida, 2002 (Japan)
- Trechiama alatus Ueno, 1979 (Taiwan)
- Trechiama albidivalis Ueno, 1994 (Japan)
- Trechiama ancorifer Ueno, 1995 (Japan)
- Trechiama angulicollis Jeannel, 1954 (Japan)
- Trechiama angustus Ueno, 1985 (Japan)
- Trechiama apicedentatus Ueno, 1979 (Japan)
- Trechiama applanatus Ueno, 1980 (Japan)
- Trechiama asagonis Ashida, 2005 (Japan)
- Trechiama asymmetricus Ueno, 1990 (Japan)
- Trechiama babai Ueno, 1994 (Japan)
- Trechiama balli Ueno, 1986 (Japan)
- Trechiama bandoi Ueno, 1986 (Japan)
- Trechiama biuncinatus Ashida, 2002 (Japan)
- Trechiama borealis Ueno, 1961 (Japan)
- Trechiama brevior Ueno, 1980 (Japan)
- Trechiama canalatus Ueno, 1980 (Japan)
- Trechiama cantantimaris Ueno, 2002 (Japan)
- Trechiama carinatus Ueno & Mori, 2000 (Japan)
- Trechiama chikaichii Ueno, 1957 (Japan)
- Trechiama chui Ueno, 1990 (Taiwan)
- Trechiama chujoi Ueno & Ito, 2005 (Japan)
- Trechiama cognatus Ueno, 1988 (Japan)
- Trechiama cordicollis Ueno, 1974 (Japan)
- Trechiama cornutus Ueno, 1983 (Japan)
- Trechiama crassilobatus Ueno, 1977 (Japan)
- Trechiama cuancao Ueno, 1991 (Taiwan)
- Trechiama cuspidatus Ueno, 1985 (Japan)
- Trechiama dispar Ueno, 1988 (Japan)
- Trechiama dissitus Ueno, 1984 (Japan)
- Trechiama duplicatus Ueno, 1986 (Japan)
- Trechiama echigonis Ueno, 1972 (Japan)
- Trechiama erecticedrus Ueno, 2001 (Japan)
- Trechiama etsumianus Ueno, 1988 (Japan)
- Trechiama exilis Ueno, 1983 (Japan)
- Trechiama expectatus Ueno, 1983 (Japan)
- Trechiama falcatus Ashida, 2002 (Japan)
- Trechiama foliolatus Ashida, 2002 (Japan)
- Trechiama fujitai Ueno, 1969 (Japan)
- Trechiama fujiwaraorum Ueno, 1981 (Japan)
- Trechiama gracilior Ueno, 1980 (Japan)
- Trechiama grandicollis Ueno, 1980 (Japan)
- Trechiama habei (Ueno, 1954) (Japan)
- Trechiama hamatus Ueno, 1990 (Taiwan)
- Trechiama hiroyukii Ueno, 2001 (Japan)
- Trechiama hiurai Ueno, 1985 (Japan)
- Trechiama humicola Ueno, 2000 (Japan)
- Trechiama ikunoensis Ashida, 2005 (Japan)
- Trechiama imadatei (Ueno & Shibanai, 1954) (Japan)
- Trechiama inermis Ueno, 1980 (Japan)
- Trechiama inexpectatus Ueno, 1980 (Japan)
- Trechiama inflexus Ueno, 1971 (Japan)
- Trechiama insolitus (Ueno, 1959) (Japan)
- Trechiama insperatus Ueno, 1970 (Japan)
- Trechiama instabilis Ueno, 1981 (Japan)
- Trechiama insularis Ueno, 1980 (Japan)
- Trechiama intermedius Ueno, 1980 (Japan)
- Trechiama ion Ashida & Souma, 2008 (Japan)
- Trechiama itoi Ueno, 1995 (Japan)
- Trechiama iwasakii Ueno, 1988 (Japan)
- Trechiama janoanus (Jeannel, 1939) (North Korea)
- Trechiama kameyamai Ashida, 2002 (Japan)
- Trechiama kawanoi Ueno, 1975 (Japan)
- Trechiama kimurai Ueno, 1959 (Japan)
- Trechiama kosugei Ueno, 1955 (Japan)
- Trechiama kryzhanovskii (Lafer, 1989) (Russia)
- Trechiama kurosawai Ueno, 1986 (Japan)
- Trechiama kusakarii Ueno, 1986 (Japan)
- Trechiama kuznetsovi Ueno & Lafer, 1992 (Japan)
- Trechiama latilobatus Ashida, 2003 (Japan)
- Trechiama lavicola (Ueno, 1960) (Japan)
- Trechiama lewisi (Jeannel, 1924) (Japan)
- Trechiama longicollis Ueno, 1986 (Japan)
- Trechiama longissimus Ueno, 1991 (Taiwan)
- Trechiama mahoae Ueno, 1980 (Japan)
- Trechiama maja Ueno, 2002 (Japan)
- Trechiama mammalis Ueno, 1987 (Japan)
- Trechiama masaakii Ueno & Sone, 1994 (Japan)
- Trechiama masatakai Ueno, 1983 (Japan)
- Trechiama medicirex Ueno, 1989 (Japan)
- Trechiama meridianus Ueno, 1994 (Japan)
- Trechiama minutus Ueno, 1971 (Japan)
- Trechiama misawai Matsui & Matsui, 2010 (Japan)
- Trechiama montisfolii Ueno, 2001 (Japan)
- Trechiama montislunae Ueno, 2001 (Japan)
- Trechiama morii Ashida, 1999 (Japan)
- Trechiama moritai Ueno, 1985 (Japan)
- Trechiama murakamii Ueno, 1984 (Japan)
- Trechiama muraokaensis Ashida, 2007 (Japan)
- Trechiama nagahatai Ueno & Sone, 2008 (Japan)
- Trechiama nagahinis Ueno, 1976 (Japan)
- Trechiama nakaoi Ueno, 1972 (Japan)
- Trechiama namigatai Ueno, 1989 (Japan)
- Trechiama nivalis Ueno, 1986 (Japan)
- Trechiama nonensis Ueno, 1995 (Japan)
- Trechiama notoi Ueno, 1981 (Japan)
- Trechiama obliquus Ueno, 1985 (Japan)
- Trechiama occidentalis Ueno, 1987 (Japan)
- Trechiama ohkawai Ueno, 1993 (Japan)
- Trechiama ohkurai Ueno, 1996 (Japan)
- Trechiama ohruii Ueno, 1972 (Japan)
- Trechiama ohshimai (Ueno, 1951) (Japan)
- Trechiama oja Ashida, 2003 (Japan)
- Trechiama okudai Ashida, 2007 (Japan)
- Trechiama ondai Ueno, 1993 (Japan)
- Trechiama oni Ueno, 1955 (Japan)
- Trechiama oniceps Ueno, 1989 (Japan)
- Trechiama onocoro Ueno, 1983 (Japan)
- Trechiama oopterus Ueno, 1995 (Japan)
- Trechiama oreas (Bates, 1883) (Japan)
- Trechiama ovoideus Ueno, 1970 (Japan)
- Trechiama pacatus Ueno, 1994 (Japan)
- Trechiama pallidior Ueno, 1981 (Japan)
- Trechiama parvus Ueno, 1980 (Japan)
- Trechiama paucisaeta Ueno & Nishikawa, 2001 (Japan)
- Trechiama perissus Ueno, 1983 (Japan)
- Trechiama planipennis Ueno, 1995 (Japan)
- Trechiama pluto Ueno, 1958 (Japan)
- Trechiama reductoculatus Ueno, 1992 (Japan)
- Trechiama rotundipennis Ueno, 1980 (Japan)
- Trechiama ruri Ashida, 1998 (Japan)
- Trechiama saitoi Ashida, 2005 (Japan)
- Trechiama sakuragii Ueno, 2009 (Japan)
- Trechiama sasajii Ueno, 1980 (Japan)
- Trechiama satoui Ueno, 1975 (Japan)
- Trechiama setosus Ueno, 1990 (Japan)
- Trechiama shuten Ueno, 1978 (Japan)
- Trechiama sichotanus (Lafer, 1989) (Russia)
- Trechiama sigma Ueno, 1980 (Japan)
- Trechiama silicicola Ueno, 1981 (Japan)
- Trechiama sinuatus Ueno, 1995 (Japan)
- Trechiama siva Ashida, 2004 (Japan)
- Trechiama solorientis Ueno, 2001 (Japan)
- Trechiama sonei Ueno, 1982 (Japan)
- Trechiama sonuta Ueno, 1992 (Japan)
- Trechiama soumai Ashida, 2002 (Japan)
- Trechiama spinosus Ueno, 1980 (Japan)
- Trechiama spinulifer Ueno, 1985 (Japan)
- Trechiama subparallelus Ueno, 1980 (Japan)
- Trechiama suzukaensis Ueno, 1980 (Japan)
- Trechiama suzukii Ueno, 1989 (Japan)
- Trechiama tamaensis Yoshida & Nomura, 1960 (Japan)
- Trechiama tangonis Ueno, 1985 (Japan)
- Trechiama tanzawanus Ueno & Sone, 1994 (Japan)
- Trechiama tener Ueno, 1989 (Japan)
- Trechiama tenuiformis Ueno, 1980 (Japan)
- Trechiama tenuis Ueno, 1983 (Japan)
- Trechiama teradai Ueno, 1971 (Japan)
- Trechiama terraenovae Ueno, 1988 (Japan)
- Trechiama tokui Ueno, 1989 (Japan)
- Trechiama triops Ueno, 1994 (Japan)
- Trechiama tripraecipitis Ueno, 2002 (Japan)
- Trechiama tsurugaensis Ueno, 1980 (Japan)
- Trechiama umbraticus Ueno, 1983 (Japan)
- Trechiama uncatus Ueno, 1986 (Japan)
- Trechiama une Ueno, 2001 (Japan)
- Trechiama uzushio Ueno, 2009 (Japan)
- Trechiama varians Ueno, 1981 (Japan)
- Trechiama watanabei Ueno, 1971 (Japan)
- Trechiama watanabeorum Ueno, 2002 (Japan)
- Trechiama yamajii Ueno, 2000 (Japan)
- Trechiama yamashitai Ashida, 2001 (Japan)
- Trechiama yokoyamai Ueno, 1958 (Japan)
- Trechiama yoro Ashida, 1998 (Japan)
- Trechiama yoshiakii Ueno, 1978 (Japan)
- Trechiama yoshidai Ueno, 1983 (Japan)
- Trechiama yoshihikoi Ueno, 2001 (Japan)
- Trechiama yoshikoae Ueno, 1994 (Japan)
- Trechiama yukikoae Ueno, 1985 (Japan)
