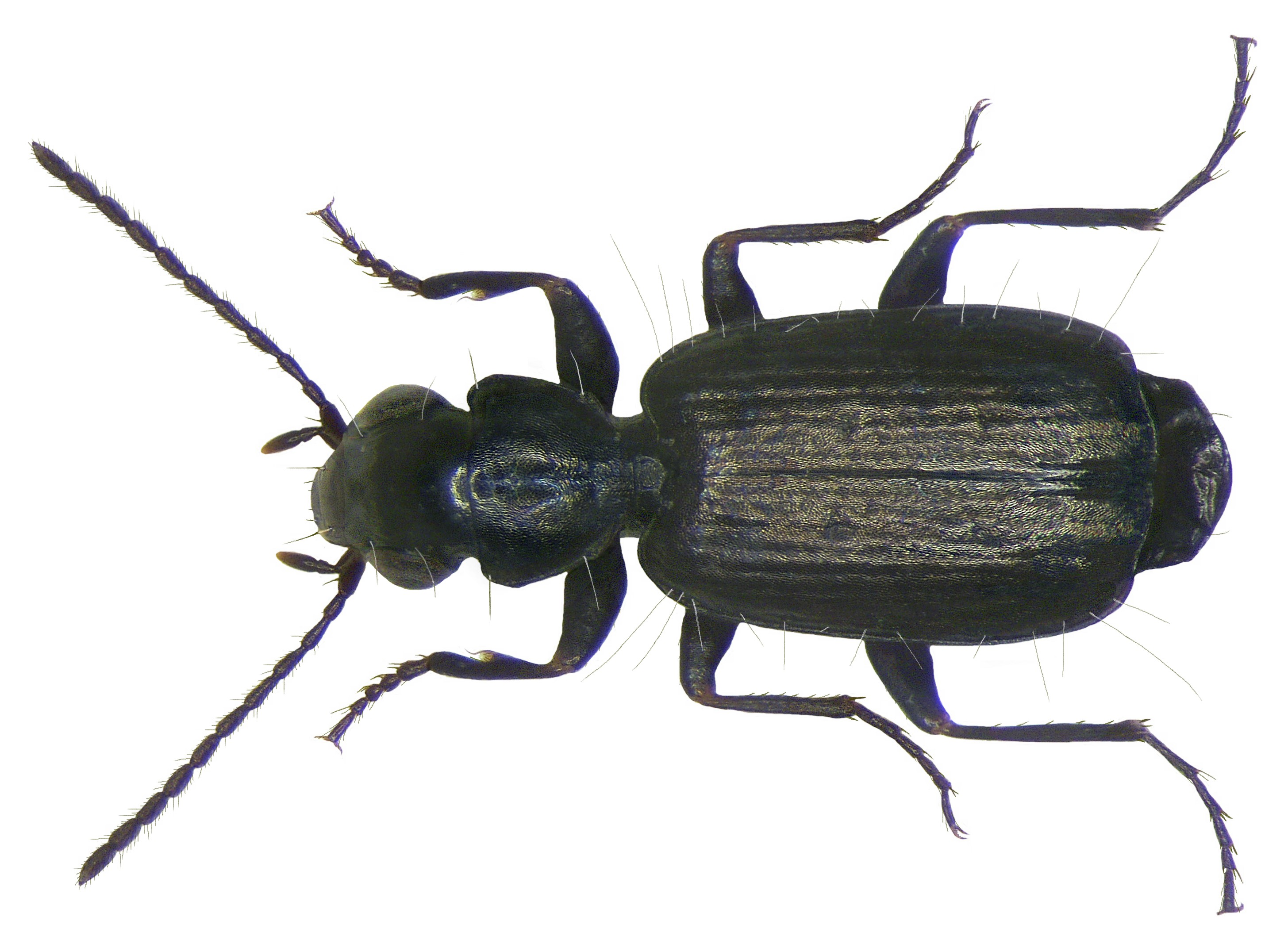
- Syntomus foveatus

Scientific classification
- Domain: Eukaryota
- Kingdom: Animalia
- Phylum: Arthropoda
- Class: Insecta
- Order: Coleoptera
- Suborder: Adephaga
- Family: Carabidae
- Subfamily: Lebiinae
- Tribe: Lebiini
- Genus: Syntomus; Hope, 1838

= Syntomus =

Genus of beetles

Syntomus is a genus in the beetle family Carabidae. There are at least 50 described species in Syntomus.

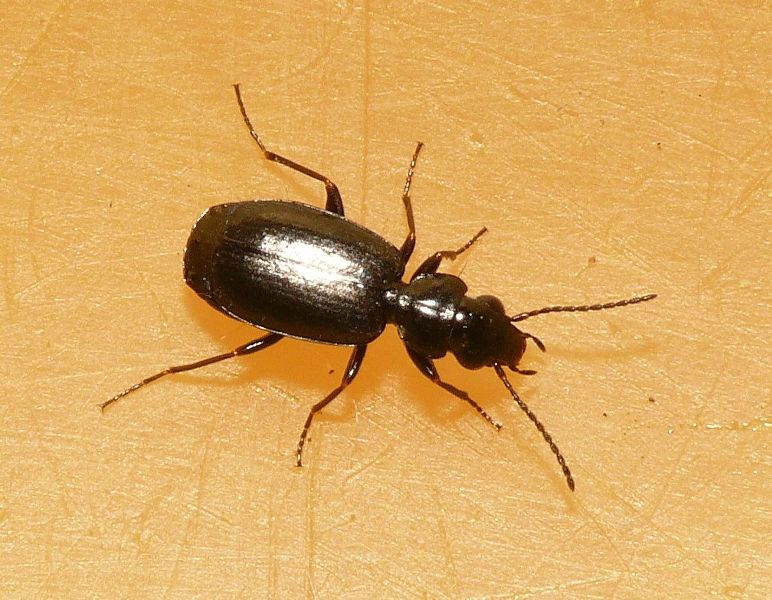
Syntomus truncatellus

== Species ==
These 50 species belong to the genus Syntomus:

- Syntomus africanus Mateu, 1985
- Syntomus americanus (Dejean, 1831)
- Syntomus andrewesi (Jedlicka, 1936)
- Syntomus arrowi (Jedlicka, 1936)
- Syntomus barbarus (Puel, 1938)
- Syntomus bedeli (Puel, 1924)
- Syntomus bifasciatus (Jedlicka, 1936)
- Syntomus brevipennis (Wollaston, 1864)
- Syntomus cymindulus (Bates, 1892)
- Syntomus dilutipes (Reitter, 1887)
- Syntomus elgonicus (Basilewsky, 1948)
- Syntomus erythreensis Mateu, 1985
- Syntomus foveatus (Geoffroy in Fourcroy, 1785)
- Syntomus foveolatus (Dejean, 1831)
- Syntomus fuscomaculatus (Motschulsky, 1844)
- Syntomus gentilis (Chaudoir, 1876)
- Syntomus grayii (Wollaston, 1867)
- Syntomus hastatus (Andrewes, 1931)
- Syntomus impar (Andrewes, 1930)
- Syntomus impressus (Dejean, 1825)
- Syntomus inaequalis (Wollaston, 1863)
- Syntomus jaechi Kirschenhofer, 1988
- Syntomus javanus (Andrewes, 1937)
- Syntomus lancerotensis (Wollaston, 1864)
- Syntomus lateralis (Motschulsky, 1855)
- Syntomus leleupi Mateu, 1980
- Syntomus lundbladi (Jeannel, 1938)
- Syntomus maculatus (Jedlicka, 1936)
- Syntomus masaicus Mateu, 1968
- Syntomus michaelseni (Kuntzen, 1919)
- Syntomus mongolicus (Motschulsky, 1844)
- Syntomus montanus (Bedel, 1913)
- Syntomus monticola (Andrewes, 1923)
- Syntomus namanus (Kuntzen, 1919)
- Syntomus nepalensis (Jedlicka, 1964)
- Syntomus nitidulus (Piochard de la Brûlerie, 1868)
- Syntomus obscuroguttatus (Duftschmid, 1812)
- Syntomus pallipes (Dejean, 1825)
- Syntomus parallelus (Ballion, 1871)
- Syntomus philippinus (Jedlicka, 1936)
- Syntomus pubescens Mateu, 1986
- Syntomus quadripunctatus (Schmidt-Goebel, 1846)
- Syntomus rufulus Mateu, 1980
- Syntomus silensis (A.Fiori, 1899)
- Syntomus submaculatus (Wollaston, 1861)
- Syntomus subvittatus (Bates, 1892)
- Syntomus transvaalensis Mateu, 1980
- Syntomus truncatellus (Linnaeus, 1760)
- Syntomus wutaishanicus Kirschenhofer, 1986
- Syntomus yemenita Mateu, 1986
