= Syntomus americanus =

Scientific classification
- Kingdom: Animalia
- Phylum: Arthropoda
- Class: Insecta
- Order: Coleoptera
- Suborder: Adephaga
- Family: Carabidae
- Genus: Syntomus
- Species: S. americanus

Binomial name
- Syntomus americanus (Dejean, 1831)

Species of beetle

Syntomus americanus is a species of ground beetle in the family Carabidae. It is found in North America.
