= Allenby Formation =

Sedimentary rock formation in British Columbia, Canada

- Stratigraphic range: Ypresian; 52.5–48 Ma
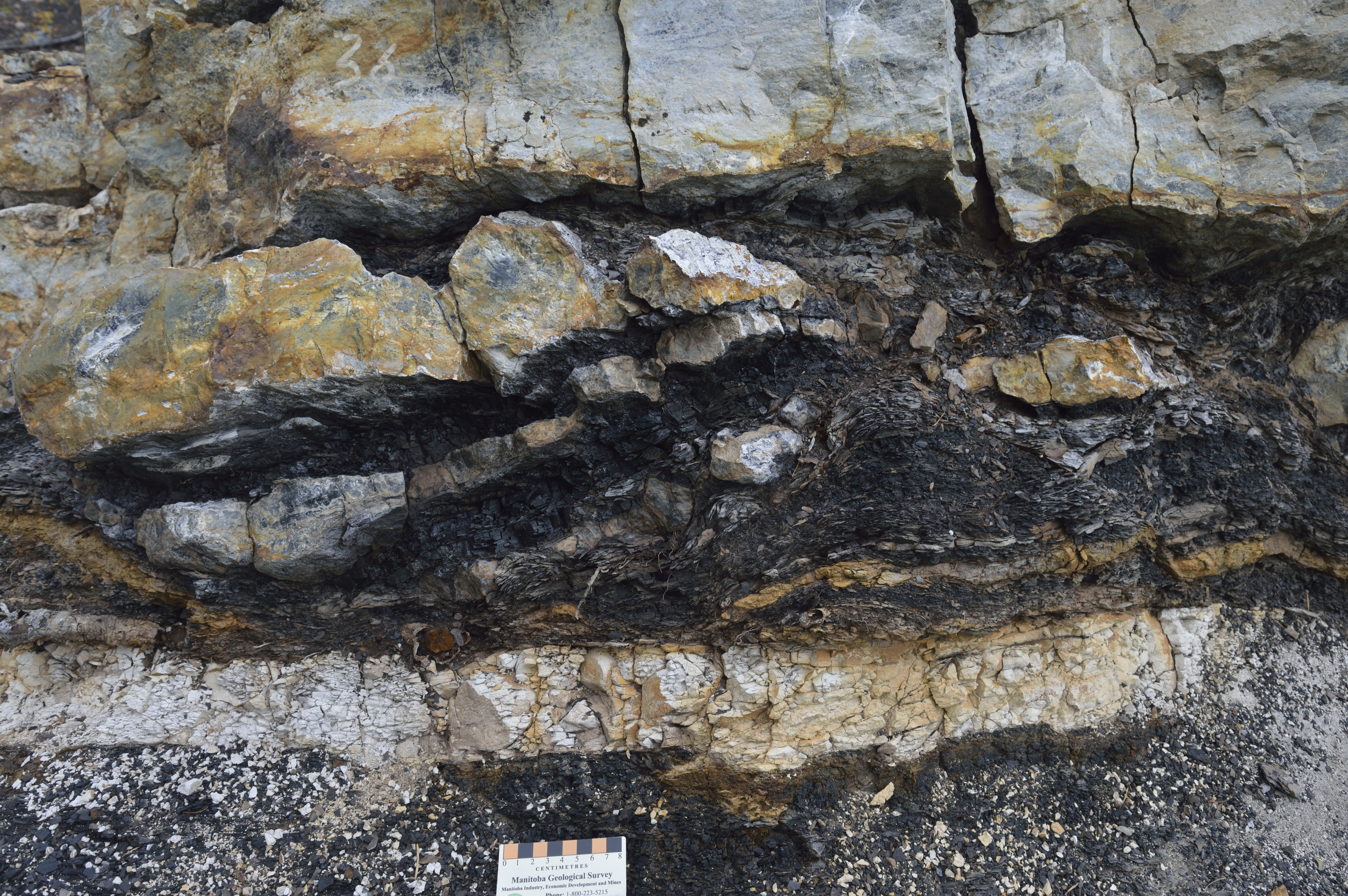
- Alternating Princeton Chert and coal sequences
- Type: Geological formation
- Unit of: Princeton Group, Eocene Okanagan Highlands
- Sub-units: Princeton Chert, Vermillion Bluffs Shale
- Overlies: Cedar Formation
- Area: 300 km^{2} (120 sq mi)
- Thickness: 1,860–2,100 m (6,100–6,890 ft)

Lithology
- Primary: Shale, sandstone
- Other: Coal–breccia, coal–chert

Location
- Coordinates: 49°22.6′N 120°32.8′W
- Approximate paleocoordinates: 53.1°N 107.5°W
- Region: British Columbia
- Country: Canada
- Extent: Princeton Basin & Tulameen basin

Type section
- Named for: Allenby, British Columbia
- Named by: Shaw
- Year defined: 1952
- Allenby Formation (Canada) Allenby Formation (British Columbia)

The Allenby formation is a sedimentary rock formation in British Columbia which was deposited during the Ypresian stage of the Early Eocene. It consists of conglomerates, sandstones with interbedded shales and coal. The shales contain an abundance of insect, fish and plant fossils known from 1877 and onward, while the Princeton Chert was first indented in the 1950s and is known from anatomically preserved plants.

There are several notable fossil producing localities in the Princeton & Tulameen basins. Historical collection sites included Nine Mile Creek, Vermilian Bluffs, and Whipsaw Creek, while modern sites include One Mile Creek, Pleasant Valley, Thomas Ranch, and the Princeton Chert.

== Extent and correlation ==
The Allenby is estimated to have an overall extent of approximately 300 km^{2} (120 sq mi), though actual outcroppings of the formation make up less than 1% of the formation, while other exploratory contact is via boreholes and mines. The half-graben which contains the formation is separated into two major depositional basins, the Princeton basin around Princeton, British Columbia and the Tulameen basin centered approximately 17 km (11 mi) west. The grabens extensional faults at the eastern side of the basin place the hanging wall Allenby strata in contact with much older foot wall strata of the Nicola Formation which dates to the Upper Triassic.

The Allenby Formation is the southern-most of the Eocene Okanagan Highlands lakes in British Columbia, and second most southern site after the Klondike Mountain Formation of Republic, Washington and northern Ferry County. In British Columbia, the formation is coeval to the Tranquille Formation, known from the McAbee Fossil Beds and Falkland site, the Coldwater Beds, known from the Quilchena site, and Driftwood Canyon Provincial Park. The highlands, including the Allenby Formation, have been described as one of the "Great Canadian Lagerstätten" based on the diversity, quality and unique nature of the biotas that are preserved. The highlands temperate biome preserved across a large transect of lakes recorded many of the earliest appearances of modern genera, while also documenting the last stands of ancient lines.

The warm temperate uplands floras of the Allenby Formation and the highlands, associated with downfaulted lacustrine basins and active volcanism are noted to have no exact modern equivalents, due to the more seasonally equitable conditions of the Early Eocene. However, the formation has been compared to the upland ecological islands in the Virunga Mountains within the Albertine Rift of the African rift valley.

The earliest work in the region was on exploratory expeditions in 1877 and 1878, with fossils collected in the areas of Nine-Mile Creek, Vermilian Bluffs on the Similkameen River, and Whipsaw Creek. While reporting on additional plant fossils collected from British Columbia, Penhallow (1906) noted the likely coeval status of the Princeton basins with many of the sites now considered the Okanagan Highlands. Modern collecting has centered on the areas around One Mile Creek, Pleasant Valley, and Thomas Ranch.

== Age ==
The age estimates for the Allenby Formation have varied a number of times since the first explorations happened in the 1870s. Shaw (1952) dated the formation as Oligocene, an age followed by Arnold (1955). Half a decade later, the older age of 48 ± 2 million years old was first suggested, with a younger age being suggested at 46.2 ± 1.9 million years old in 2000 and an older date of 52.08 ± 0.12 million years ago obtained from uranium–lead dating of zircons from Vermilion Bluffs shale in 2005.

== Lithology ==
The Allenby is composed of cyclical sedimentation events that were deposited along the course of a river-system in conjunction with depositional areas from nearby lakes and wetlands. Coeval volcanic eruptive events are recorded as interbeds of tephras and lavas, while the riverine course is marked with depositional areas of conglomerates and sandstones. The quieter environments are noted for finer layers of shales and coalified layers.

The coal seams throughout the formation are typically sub-bituminous.

Notable in conjunction with the coal seams are sections of chert which formed during silica rich periods. The rapid cyclical changes from coal to chert and back are not noted in any other fossil locality in the world. An estimated 49 coal-chert cycles are known, though the exact conditions for this process are not well understood. Silica rich volcanic episodes in the region during deposition would have been needed for formation of the cherts, while slowly moving waters and gently subsiding terrains would be needed for the peats and fens to accumulate. Rates of organic deposition in swamps have been estimated at 0.5–1 mm (0.020–0.039 in) in modern temperate climates, this suggests the time needed for each 10–20 cm (3.9–7.9 in) chert layer would be at least 100 years or more, with the full sequence of cycles taking place over no more than 15,000 years.

== Palynoflora ==
Palynological analysis of samples from the Thomas ranch site by Dillhoff et al. (2013) resulted in the identification of 32 pollen and spore types that were assignable to family or genus level, with a total number of distinct pollen and spore types, including unassignable morphotypes, number over 70. The predominant pollens of the site are conifers, which make up between 85%–97% of the total pollens, while the angiosperm pollens are dominated by members of Betulaceae.

Several pteridophyte families and genera are represented as spore fossils alone, without corresponding megafossil records, including Lycopodiaceae, Osmundaceae, and Schizaeaceae. Similarly, at least three additional conifer genera are only present as pollen fossils and up to 12 angiosperms are present in the pollen record. Sometimes considered a Biostratgraphic index fossil, the angiosperm palynospecies Pistillipollenites macgregorii has been recovered from several sites in the Allenby Formation, while the palynospecies Erdtmanipollis pachysandroides is rare, having only been reported from the formation twice.

Family	Genus	Species	Pollen/Macrofossil	Notes	Images
Aquifoliaceae	Ilex	Unidentified	Pollen	A holly palynomorph	
Arecaceae	Sabal	Cf. †Sabal granopollenites	Pollen	A palm palynomorph	
Buxaceae	†Erdtmanipollis	†Erdtmanipollis pachysandroides	Pollen	A box family palynomorph	
Betulaceae	Alnus	Unidentified	Pollen & macrofossils	An alder palynomorph	
Betulaceae	Betula	Unidentified	Pollen & macrofossils	A birch palynomorph	
Betulaceae	Carpinus	Unidentified	Pollen	A hornbeam palynomorph	
Betulaceae	Corylus	unidentified	Pollen	A hazelnut palynomorph	
Cupressaceae	Cunninghamia	unidentified	Pollen	A Cunninghamia like palynomorph	
Cupressaceae	Sequoiapollenites	Unidentified	Pollen & macrofossils	A redwood palynomorph	
Cupressaceae	Taxodiaceaepollenites	Unidentified	Pollen & macrofossils	A Taxodioideae subfamily palynomorph	
Elaeagnaceae	Cf. Elaeagnus	Unidentified	Pollen	An elaeagnaceous palynomorph, similar to oleaster	
Ericaceae	unidentified	Unidentified	Pollen	An ericaceous palynomorph of uncertain affinity	
Fagaceae	Castanea	Unidentified	Pollen	A chestnut palynomorph	
Fagaceae	†Eotrigonobalanus	Unidentified	Pollen	A fagaceous palynomorph	
Fagaceae	Fagus	"Fagus Pollen type 3"	Pollen	A beech palynomorph	
Fagaceae	Fagus	"Fagus Pollen type 2"	Pollen	A beech palynomorph	
Fagaceae	†Paraquercus	†Paraquercus eocaena	Pollen	A fagaceous palynomorph	
Fagaceae	Quercus	"Quercus Pollen type 1"	Pollen	An oak palynomorph, similar to Quercus Group Lobatae pollen	
Fagaceae	Quercus	"Quercus Pollen type 2"	Pollen	An oak palynomorph, ancestral type with Quercus Group Ilex morphology	
Fagaceae	†Trigonobalanopsis	Unidentified	Pollen	A fagaceous palynomorph	
Fagaceae	Unidentified	Unidentified	Pollen	A Fagoideceous palynomorph	
Fagaceae	Cf. Quercus	Unidentified	Pollen	A fagaceous palynomorph, similar to oak	
Ginkgoaceae	†Cycadopites	†Cycadopites follicularis	Pollen & macrofossils	A Ginkgo palynomorph	
Hamamelidaceae	Liquidambar	Unidentified	Pollen	A sweet gum palynomorph	
Juglandaceae	Carya	Unidentified	Pollen	A hickory palynomorph	
Juglandaceae	Pterocarya	Unidentified	Pollen	A hickory palynomorph	
Lycopodiaceae	Lycopodium	Unidentified	Pollen	A lycopod palynomorph	
Malvaceae	Tilia	Unidentified	Pollen	A linden palynomorph	
Osmundaceae	Osmundasporites	Unidentified	Pollen	An osmundaceous fern palynomorph	
Pinaceae	Abies	Unidentified	Pollen & macrofossils	A fir palynomorph	
Pinaceae	†Alisporites	Unidentified	Pollen	A pine family palynomorph	
Pinaceae	Picea	Unidentified	Pollen	A Picea palynomorph	
Pinaceae	Pinus	Unidentified	Pollen & macrofossils	A Pinus palynomorph	
Pinaceae	†Pityosporites	Unidentified	Pollen	A pine family palynomorph	
Pinaceae	Pseudolarix	Unidentified	Pollen & macrofossils	A Pseudolarix palynomorph	
Pinaceae	Tsuga	Unidentified	Pollen	A Tsuga palynomorph	
Pinaceae	Cf. Larix	Unidentified	Pollen	A Laricoidae palynomorph, similar to larch	
Pinaceae	Cf. Pseudotsuga	Unidentified	Pollen	A Laricoidae palynomorph, similar to pseudotsuga	
Platanaceae	Platanus	Unidentified	Pollen	A Platanus palynomorph	
Potamogetonaceae	Potamogeton	Unidentified	Pollen	A Potamogeton palynomorph	
Rosaceae	Unidentified	Unidentified	Pollen & macrofossils	Rose famnily palynomorphs	
Salicaceae	Salix	Unidentified	Pollen	A willow palynomorph	
Salviniaceae	Azolla	Unidentified	Pollen & macrofossils	An aquatic fern palynomorph	
Sapindaceae	Acer	Unidentified	Pollen & macrofossils	A maple palynomorph	
Sapindaceae	Aesculus	Unidentified	Pollen & macrofossils	A horse chestnut palynomorph	
Sapotaceae	Unidentified	Unidentified	Pollen	A sapotaceous palynomorph	
Taxaceae	Taxus	Unidentified	Pollen	A yew palynomorph	
Ulmaceae	Ulmus	Unidentified	Pollen & macrofossils	An elm palynomorph	
incertae sedis	†Pistillipollenites	†Pistillipollenites macgregorii	Pollen	A palynomorph of uncertain affinity, possibly a Gentianaceae or Euphorbiaceae species	

== Compression paleobiota ==
A group of six mosses were described from the Allenby Formation by Kuc (1972, 1974) representing the genera Ditrichites, Hypnites and Plagiopodopsis, with two species placed in the morphogenus Muscites. Dillhoff et al. (2013) identified twelve distinct gymnosperm taxa spanning the families Cupressaceae, Ginkgoaceae, and Pinaceae. While being the minority component of the Thomas Ranch flora by total fossil numbers, angiosperms have a higher diversity, with 45 distinct morphotypes represented as foliage, reproductive structures, or both. Seventeen of the morphotypes are identifiable to genus or species, with members of the family Betulaceae being most prominent. At least common one leaf type is suggested to possibly represent an extinct plant order, but has not been described. Only two pteridophyte species have been described from the compression flora, Azolla primaeva by Penhallow (1890) and Equisetum similkamense by Dawson (1878).

The following fossil conifers, pteridophytes, ginkgophytes and bryophytes have been described from the Allenby Formation:

=== Bryophytes ===
Family	Genus	Species	Authority	Notes	Images
Amblystegiaceae	†Hypnites	†Hypnites jovet-astiae	(Kuc) Miller	An amblystegiaceous moss First described as Palaeohypnum jovet-asti, moved to Hypnites jovet-astiae in 1980	
Amblystegiaceae	†Hypnites	†Hypnites steerei	(Kuc) Miller	An amblystegiaceous moss First described as Palaeohypnum steerei, moved to Hypnites steerei in 1980	
Bartramiaceae	†Plagiopodopsis	†Plagiopodopsis eocenicus	(Kuc) Miller	A bartramiaceous moss First described as Muscites eocenicus, moved to Plagiopodopsis eocenicus in 1980	
Incertae Sedis	†Ditrichites	†Ditrichites fylesi	Kuc	A ditrichalean moss of uncertain family placement	
Incertae Sedis	†Muscites	†Muscites maycocki	Kuc	A moss of uncertain placement	
Incertae Sedis	†Muscites	†Muscites ritchiei	Kuc	A moss of uncertain placement	

=== Pteridophytes ===
Family	Genus	Species	Authority	Notes	Images
Equisetaceae	Equisetum	†Equisetum similkamense	Dawson	A scouring rush	
Salviniaceae	Azolla	†Azolla primaeva	(Penhallow) Arnold	A mosquito fern First described as Azollophyllum primaevum	

=== Gingkophytes ===
Family	Genus	Species	Authority	Notes	Images
Ginkgoaceae	Ginkgo	Ginkgo biloba	Linnaeus	A ginkgo	
Ginkgoaceae	Ginkgo	†Ginkgo dissecta	Mustoe, 2002	A ginkgo with highly dissected leaves	

=== Pinophytes ===
Family	Genus	Species	Authority	Notes	Images
Cupressaceae	Chamaecyparis	†Chamaecyparis linguaefolia	(Lesquereux) MacGinitie	A false cypress	
Cupressaceae	Metasequoia	†Metasequoia occidentalis	(Newberry) Chaney	A dawn redwood First identified as "Sequoia" brevifolia, "S." heeri. "S." langsdorfii (in part), "S." nordenskiöldi, & Taxodium distichum miocenum (in part)	
Cupressaceae	Sequoia	†Sequoia affinis	Lesquereux	A redwood	Sequoia affinis
Cupressaceae	Taxodium	†Taxodium dubium	(Sternberg) Heer	A bald cypress First identified as "Sequoia" angustifolia, "S." langsdorfii (in part), & Taxodium distichum miocenum (in part)	
Pinaceae	Abies	†Abies milleri	Shorn & Wehr, 1986	Oldest true fir described	Abies milleri
Pinaceae	Picea	Undescribed	Miller	A spruce Not described to species	
Pinaceae	Pinus	†Pinus latahensis	Berry	A 5-needle pine	Pinus latahensis
Pinaceae	Pinus	†Pinus monticolensis	Berry	A pinaceous winged seed	
Pinaceae	Pinus	†Pinus trunculus	Dawson, 1890	A 3-needle pine	
Pinaceae	Pinus	†Pinus tulameenensis	Penhallow	A 5-needle pine	
Pinaceae	Pseudolarix	Pseudolarix amabilis	(J.Nelson) Rehder	A golden larch Originally identified as Pseudolarix americana, then as Pseudolarix arnoldii	
Pinaceae	Pseudolarix	†Pseudolarix wehrii	Gooch	A golden larch	Pseudolarix wehrii

=== Angiosperms ===
Family	Genus	Species	Authority	Notes	Images
Anacardiaceae	Rhus	†Rhus malloryi	Wolfe & Wehr	A sumac	Rhus malloryi
Amaryllidaceae	†Paleoallium	†Paleoallium billgenseli	Pigg, Bryan, & DeVore	An onion relative	Paleoallium billgenseli
Araceae	Orontium	†Orontium wolfei	Bogner, Johnson, Kvaček & Upchurch	A golden-club	Orontium wolfei
Betulaceae	Alnus	†Alnus parvifolia	(Berry) Wolfe & Wehr	An Alder	Alnus parvifolia
Betulaceae	Betula	†Betula leopoldae	Wolfe & Wehr	A birch	Betula leopoldae
Betulaceae	†Palaeocarpinus	†Palaeocarpinus stonebergae	Pigg, Manchester, & Wehr	A coryloid genus	
Cercidiphyllaceae	Cercidiphyllum	†Cercidiphyllum obtritum	(Dawson) Wolfe & Wehr	A katsura	Cercidiphyllum obtritum
Fagaceae	†Fagopsis	†Fagopsis undulata	(Knowlton) Wolfe & Wehr	A beech	Fagopsis undulata
Fagaceae	Fagus	Undescribed		A beech species Not described to species	
Grossulariaceae	Ribes	Undescribed		A gooseberry species Not described	
Hamamelidaceae	Fothergilla	†Fothergilla malloryi	Radtke, Pigg & Wehr	A winter-hazel species	Fothergilla malloryi
Juglandaceae	Pterocarya	Undescribed		A wingnut Not described to species	
Lauraceae	Lindera	Undescribed		A laural species Not described to species	
Lauraceae	Sassafras	†Sassafras hesperia	Berry	A laural species	Sassafras hesperia
Malvaceae	Florissantia	Undescribed		An extinct sterculioid flower Not described to species	
Myricaceae	Comptonia	†Comptonia columbiana	Dawson	A sweet fern	Comptonia columbiana
Nyssaceae	†Tsukada	†Tsukada davidiifolia	Wolfe & Wehr	A dove-tree relative	Tsukada davidiifolia
Platanaceae	Macginicarpa	Undescribed	Manchester	A sycamore morphospecies	
Platanaceae	†Macginitiea	†Macginitiea gracilis	(Lesquereux) Wolfe & Wehr	A sycamore	Macginitiea gracilis
Rosaceae	Amelanchier	Unidentified		A service berry Not described	
Rosaceae	Neviusia	†Neviusia dunthornei	DeVore et al.	A snow wreath	
Rosaceae	†Stonebergia	†Stonebergia columbiana	Wolfe & Wehr	A Sorbarieae genus	
Sapindaceae	Acer	†Acer princetonense	Wolfe & Tanai	A maple	
Sapindaceae	Acer	†Acer rousei	Wolfe & Tanai	A maple	
Sapindaceae	Acer	†Acer stockeyae	Wolfe & Tanai	A maple	
Sapindaceae	Acer	†Acer stewarti	Wolfe & Tanai	A maple	
Sapindaceae	Acer	†Acer stonebergae	Wolfe & Tanai	A maple	
Sapindaceae	Acer	†Acer toradense	Wolfe & Tanai	A maple	
Sapindaceae	Acer	†Acer wehri	Wolfe & Tanai	A maple	
Sapindaceae	Dipteronia	†Dipteronia brownii	McClain and Manchester	A Dipteronia species	Dipteronia brownii
Trochodendraceae	Tetracentron	†Tetracentron hopkinsii	Pigg et al.	A Tetracentron relative	Tetracentron hopkinsii
Trochodendraceae	†Zizyphoides	Undescribed		A trochodendraceous species Not described	
Ulmus	Ulmus	†Ulmus okanaganensis	Denk & Dillhoff	An elm	Ulmus okanaganensis
Urticaceae	Cf. Urticeae	Undescribed		A nettle not described to genus First identified as Rubus	
Incertae sedis	†Chaneya	†Chaneya tenuis	(Lesquereux) Wang & Manchester	A sapindalean flower of uncertain affiliations	Chaneya tenuis

== Animals ==
=== Mollusks ===
Family	Genus	Species	Authority	Notes	Images
Hydrobiidae	†Micropyrgus	†Micropyrgus camselli	L.S. Russell, 1957	A hydrobiid mud snail	
Lymnaeidae	Stagnicola	†Stagnicola tulameenensis	L.S. Russell, 1957	A lymnaeine pond snail	
Physidae	Aplexa	†Aplexa ricei	L.S. Russell, 1957	An aplexine bladder snail	
Physidae	Physa	†Physa saxarubrensis	L.S. Russell, 1957	A physine bladder snail	
Planorbidae	Ferrissia	†Ferrissia arionoides	L.S. Russell, 1957	An ancylinine ramshorn snail	
Planorbidae	Gyraulus?	Indeterminate	L.S. Russell, 1957	A possible planorbinine ramshorn snail Not described to species	
Sphaeriidae	Sphaerium?	Indeterminate	L.S. Russell, 1957	A possible sphaeriine fingernail clam Not described to species	

=== Insects ===
==== Coleopterans ====
Family	Genus	Species	Authority	Notes	Images
Cantharidae	Unidentified	Unidentified		A soldier beetle not identified to genus or species	
Carabidae?	Unidentified	Unidentified		A caraboid superfamily beetle Displays traits similar to both Cicindelidae and Carabidae not identified to genus or species	
Chrysomelidae	†Cryptocephalites	†Cryptocephalites punctatus	Scudder, 1895	A leaf beetle	Cryptocephalites punctatus (1895 illustration)
Chrysomelidae	Galerucella	†Galerucella picea	Scudder, 1879	A leaf beetle	Galerucella picea (1890 illustration)
Elateridae	Cryptohypnus?	†Cryptohypnus? terrestris	Scudder, 1879	A click beetle	Cryptohypnus? terrestris (1890 illustration)
Elateridae	Elaterites	Undescribed	Scudder, 1895	A click beetle Not described to species	Elateridae sp. indet (1890 illustration)
Elateridae	Limonius	†Limonius impunctus	Scudder, 1895	A wireworm click beetle	Limonius impunctus (1895 illustration)
Tenebrionidae	Tenebrio	†Tenebrio primigenius	Scudder, 1879	A darkling beetle	Tenebrio primigenius (1890 illustration)
Trogidae	Trox	†Trox oustaleti	Scudder, 1879	A hide beetle	Trox oustaleti (1890 illustration)

==== Dipterans ====
Family	Genus	Species	Authority	Notes	Images
Bibionidae	Penthetria	†Penthetria? fryi	Rice, 1959	A marchfly	Penthetria (?) fryi
Bibionidae	Penthetria	†Penthetria whipsawensis	Rice, 1959	A marchfly	Penthetria whipsawensis
Bibionidae	Plecia	†Plecia avus	(Handlirsch, 1910)	A marchfly First described as Penthetria avus (1910), moved to Plecia avus (1959)	Plecia avus
Bibionidae	Plecia	†Plecia canadensis	(Handlirsch, 1910)	A marchfly First described as Penthetria canadensis (1910), moved to Plecia canadensis (1959)	Plecia canadensis
Bibionidae	Plecia	†Plecia curtula	(Handlirsch, 1910)	A marchfly First described as Penthetria curtula (1910), moved to Plecia curtula (1959); Senior synonym of Penthetria avunculus (1959)	Plecia curtula
Bibionidae	Plecia	†Plecia dilatata	(Handlirsch, 1910)	A marchfly First described as Penthetria dilatata (1910), moved to Plecia dilatata (1959)	Plecia dilatata
Bibionidae	Plecia	†Plecia elatior	(Handlirsch, 1910)	A marchfly First described as Penthetria elatior (1910), moved to Plecia elatior (1959)	Plecia elatior
Bibionidae	Plecia	†Plecia minutula	Rice, 1959	A marchfly	Plecia minutula
Bibionidae	Plecia	†Plecia nana	(Handlirsch, 1910)	A marchfly First described as Penthetria nana (1910), moved to Plecia nana (1959)	Plecia nana
Bibionidae	Plecia	†Plecia pictipennis	(Handlirsch, 1910)	A marchfly First described as Penthetria pictipennis (1910), moved to Plecia pictipennis (1959) Penthetria lambei (1910), Penthetria ovalis (1910), & Penthetria separanda (1910) considered junior synonyms (1959)	Plecia pictipennis
Bibionidae	Plecia	†Plecia pulchra	(Handlirsch, 1910)	A marchfly First described as Penthetria pulchra (1910), moved to Plecia pulchra (1959)	Plecia pulchra
Bibionidae	Plecia	†Plecia pulla	(Handlirsch, 1910)	A marchfly First described as Penthetria pulla (1910), moved to Plecia pulla (1959); Penthetria brevipes (1910) considered a junior synonym (1959)	Plecia pulla
Bibionidae	Plecia	†Plecia reducta	(Handlirsch, 1910)	A marchfly First described as Penthetria reducta (1910), moved to Plecia reducta (1959)	Plecia reducta
Bibionidae	Plecia	†Plecia similkameena	(Scudder, 1879)	A marchfly First described as Penthetria similkameena (1879), moved to Plecia similkameena (1959)	Plecia similkameena
Bibionidae	Plecia	†Plecia transitoria	(Handlirsch, 1910)	A marchfly First described as Penthetria transitoria (1910), moved to Plecia transitoria (1959); Penthetria falcatula (1910) & Penthetria fragmentum (1910) considered junior synonyms (1959)	Plecia transitoria
Bibionidae	Plecia	†Plecia tulameenensis	Rice, 1959	A marchfly	Plecia tulameenensis
Dolichopodidae	†Microphor	†Microphor defunctus	Handlirsch, 1910	A long-legged fly First described as Microphorus defunctus (1910), spelling corrected to Microphor defunctus (1994)	Microphor defunctus (1910 illustration)
Ptychopteridae	†Etoptychoptera	†Etoptychoptera tertiaria	Handlirsch, 1909	A phantom cranefly	Etoptychoptera tertiaria (1910 illustration)
Tipulidae	Tipula	†Tipula tulameena	(Handlirsch, 1910)	A cranefly	Tipula tulameena

==== Hemipterans ====
Family	Genus	Species	Authority	Notes	Images
Aphrophoridae	Aphrophora	†Aphrophora angusta	Handlirsch, 1910	A spittlebug	Aphrophora angusta (1910 illustration)
Aphrophoridae	†Palaeoptysma	†Palaeoptysma venosa	Scudder, 1895	A spittlebug	Palaeoptysma venosa (1895 illustration)
Aphrophoridae	Palaphrodes	Undescribed	Scudder, 1895	A spittlebug Not described to species	
Aphrophoridae	†Ptysmaphora	†Ptysmaphora fletcheri	Scudder, 1895	A spittlebug	Ptysmaphora fletcheri (1895 illustration)
Cercopidae	Cercopis	†Cercopis grandescens	Scudder, 1895	A froghopper	Cercopis grandescens (1895 illustration)
Cercopidae	Cercopis	†Cercopis selwyni	Scudder, 1879	A froghopper	Cercopis selwyni (1890 illustration)
Cercopidae	†Cercopites	†Cercopites torpescens	Scudder, 1895	A froghopper	Cercopites torpescens (1895 illustration)
Cercopidae	†Dawsonites	†Dawsonites veter	Scudder, 1895	A froghopper	Dawsonites veter (1895 illustration)
Cercopidae	Palecphora	Undescribed	Scudder, 1895	A froghopper Not described to species	
Cercopidae	†Stenecphora	†Stenecphora punctulata	Scudder, 1895	A froghopper	Stenecphora punctulata (1895 illustration)
Cercopidae	†Stenolocris	†Stenolocris venosa	Scudder, 1895	A froghopper	Stenolocris venosa (1895 illustration)
Cicadellidae	Coelidia	†Coelidia columbiana	Scudder, 1879	A leafhopper	Coelidia columbiana (1890 illustration)
Fulgoridae	†Enchophora	Undescribed	Scudder, 1895	A fulgorid plant hopper Not described to species	
Gerridae	†Telmatrechus	†Telmatrechus stali	(Scudder, 1879)	A gerrine water strider First described as Hygrotrechus stali (1879), moved to Telmatrechus stali (1895)	Telmatrechus stali (1890 illustration)
incertae sedis	†Planophlebia	†Planophlebia gigantea	Scudder, 1879	A hemipteran of uncertain placement	Planophlebia gigantea (1890 illustration)

==== Hymenopterans ====
Archibald, Mathewes, & Aase (2023) reported a Titanomyrma species ant queen from the Vermillion Bluffs site, and noted the range extension for Formiciinae into the highlands, as the subfamily was previously considered a strictly thermophilic ant group. Due to complications arising from preservational distortion during diagenesis, they were unable to determine the correct size of the queen in life. If the distortion was lateral, then compression to bilateral symmetry yielded an adult length of approximately 3.3 cm (1.3 in), placing it the same range as Formicium berryi and F. brodiei, known only from wings, and sugg4ested as possible males. Conversely stretching the fossil to bilateral symmetry results in a larger 5 cm (2.0 in) length estimate, placing it as comparable to queens of T. lubei and T. simillima.

Family	Genus	Species	Authority	Notes	Images
Braconidae	Bracon	Undescribed		A braconid wasp Not described to species	Bracon sp. (1890 illustration)
Formicidae	†Titanomyrma	Indeterminate		A formiciine titan ant Unplaced to species.	Titanomyrma sp.
Ichneumonidae	Xorides	†Xorides lambei	(Handlirsch, 1910)	A xoridine ichneumon parasitic wasp First named Xylonomus lambei (1910)	Xorides lambei
Tenthredinidae	Eriocampa	†Eriocampa tulameenensis	Rice, 1968	A tenthredinid sawfly	Eriocampa tulameenensis

==== Mecopterans ====
Family	Genus	Species	Authority	Notes	Images
†Dinopanorpidae	†Dinokanaga	†Dinokanaga wilsoni	Archibald, 2005	A dinopanorpid scorpion fly	
Eomeropidae	†Eomerope	†Eomerope simpkinsae	Archibald & Rasnitsyn, 2018	An eomeropid scorpionfly	

==== Neuropterans ====
Family	Genus	Species	Authority	Notes	Images
Ithonidae	†Ricaniella	†Ricaniella antiquata	(Scudder, 1895)	A Polystoechotid-group giant lacewing First described as Ricania antiquata (1895), moved to Ricaniella antiquata (1897)	Ricaniella antiquata (1895 illustration)

==== Odonata ====
Family	Genus	Species	Authority	Notes	Images
Aeshnidae	Indeterminate	Indeterminate		A darner dragonfly Wing too incomplete to determine genus affiliation.	
Cf. †Dysagrionidae	†Allenbya	†Allenbya holmesae	Archibald & Cannings, 2022	A possible dysagrionid odonate. Not to be confused with the Princeton Chert waterlily Allenbya	
†Eodichromatidae	†Labandeiraia	†Labandeiraia burlingameae	Archibald & Cannings, 2026	An eodichromatid cephalozygopteran odonate.	

==== Raphidiopterans ====
Family	Genus	Species	Authority	Notes	Images
Raphidiidae	†Megaraphidia	†Megaraphidia hopkinsi	Archibald & Makarkin, 2021	A raphidiid snakefly	

=== Vertebrates ===
Family	Genus	Species	Authors	Notes	Images
Amiidae	Cf. Amia	†"Amia" hesperia	Wilson, 1982	A bowfin	"Amia" hesperia scale
Aves incertae sedis	Unidentified	Unidentified	Mayr et al., 2019	Indeterminate feathers and a skeleton	
Catostomidae	†Wilsonium	†Wilsonium brevipinne.	(Cope, 1893)	A catostomid sucker Originally described as Amyzon brevipinne Moved to Wilsonium in 2021	
†Esthonychidae	†Trogosus	†Trogosus latidens	(Marsh, 1874)	A tillodont species	
Hiodontidae	Hiodon	†Hiodon rosei	(Hussakof, 1916)	A mooneye First described as "Lucious" rosei (1916), moved to Eohiodon rosei in 1966, moved to Hiodon rosei in 2008	
†Libotoniidae	†Libotonius	†Libotonius blakeburnensis	Wilson, 1977	A percopsiform fish	
Salmonidae	†Eosalmo	†Cf. Eosalmo driftwoodensis	Wilson, 1977	An ancestral salmon	
Trionychidae	Cf. Apalone	Undescribed		A soft shelled turtle Not described to species	

== Princeton Chert biota ==
The Princeton chert biota is unique in the Allenby formation due to the silicification of the chert, which has resulted in cellular and anatomical preservation of the organisms. As of 2016 over 30 different plant taxa had been described from chert fossils along with a number of fungal species.

=== Fungi ===
Order	Genus	Species	Authors	Notes	Images
Ascomycota	†Cryptodidymosphaerites	†Cryptodidymosphaerites princetonensis	Currah, Stockey, LePage	An ascomycetan fungus on the host palm Uhlia allenbyensis	
Ascomycota	†Monodictysporites	†Monodictysporites princetonensis	Klymiuk	An ascomycotan fungus hosted on Dennstaedtiopsis aerenchymata	
Ascomycota	†Palaeoserenomyces	†Palaeoserenomyces allenbyensis	Currah, Stockey, LePage	An ascomycetan fungus on the host palm Uhlia allenbyensis	

=== Ferns ===
Family	Genus	Species	Authors	Notes	Images
Athyriaceae	†Dickwhitea	†Dickwhitea allenbyensis	Karafit et al.	An athyriaceous fern	
Athyriaceae	†Makotopteris	†Makotopteris princetonensis	Stockey, Nishida, & Rothwell	An athyriaceous fern	
Blechnaceae	†Trawetsia	†Trawetsia princetonensis	Smith et al.	A blechnacious fern	
Dennstaedtiaceae	†Dennstaedtiopsis	†Dennstaedtiopsis aerenchymata	Cevallos-Ferriz, Stockey, & Pigg	A dennstaedtioid fern	
Osmundaceae	Osmunda	Undescribed		An osmundaceous fern Not described	

=== Conifers ===
Family	Genus	Species	Authors	Notes	Images
Cupressaceae	Metasequoia	†Metasequoia milleri	Bassinger	A dawn redwood	
Pinaceae	Pinus	†Pinus allisonii	Stockey	A 2-needled Pine foliage	
Pinaceae	Pinus	†Pinus andersonii	Stockey	A 3-needled Pine foliage	
Pinaceae	Pinus	†Pinus arnoldii	Miller	A basal Pine; Cones belonging to the 5 needle Pinus similkameenensis foliage	
Pinaceae	Pinus	†Pinus princetonensis	Stockey	A pinaceous cone	
Pinaceae	Pinus	†Pinus similkameenensis	Miller	A basal Pine; 5-needled foliage belonging to the Pinus arnoldii cones	

=== Angiosperms ===
Family	Genus	Species	Authors	Notes	Images
Alismataceae	†Heleophyton	†Heleophyton helobieoides	Erwin & Stockey	An aquatic or emergent water-plantain	
Aponogetonaceae	Aponogeton	†Aponogeton longispinosum	Grímsson, Zetter, & Halbritter	A Cape-pondweed pollen	
Araceae	†Keratosperma	†Keratosperma allenbyensis	Cevallos-Ferriz & Stockey	An arum family member	
Arecaceae	†Uhlia	†Uhlia allenbyensis	Erwin & Stockey	A Coryphoid palm	
Grossulariaceae	Ribes	Undescribed	Cevallos-Ferriz	A current fruit Not described	
Lythraceae	Decodon	†Decodon allenbyensis	Cevallos-Ferriz & Stockey	A swamp loosestrife	
Magnoliaceae	†Liriodendroxylon	†Liriodendroxylon princetonensis	Cevallos-Ferriz & Stockey	A Liriodendron-like wood.	
Myrtaceae	†Paleomyrtinaea	†Paleomyrtinaea princetonensis	Pigg, Stockey & Maxwell	A Myrtaceous fruit	
Nymphaeaceae	†Allenbya	†Allenbya collinsonae	Cevallos-Ferriz & Stockey	A water lily relative	
Nyssaceae	Diplopanax	†Diplopanax eydei	Stockey, LePage, & Pigg	A tuplo relative.	
Rosaceae	†Paleorosa	†Paleorosa similkameenensis	Bassinger	A rose family flower	
Rosaceae	Prunus	†Prunus allenbyensis	Cevallos-Ferriz & Stockey	A prunoid wood.	
Rosaceae	Prunus	"Species 1"	Cevallos-Ferriz & Stockey	A prunoid seed. Not described	
Rosaceae	Prunus	"Species 2"	Cevallos-Ferriz & Stockey	A prunoid seed. Not described	
Rosaceae	Prunus	"Species 3"	Cevallos-Ferriz & Stockey	A prunoid seed. Not described	
Sapindaceae	†Wehrwolfea	†Wehrwolfea striata	Erwin & Stockey	A possible dodonaecous soapberry family flower	
Saururaceae	Saururus	†Saururus tuckerae	Smith & Stockey	A lizard's-tail species	
Vitaceae	Ampelocissus	†"Ampelocissus" similkameenensis	Cevallos-Ferriz & Stockey	A grape family fruit of uncertain generic placement	
Vitaceae	incertae sedis	"Type 1"	Cevallos-Ferriz & Stockey	A grape family fruit of uncertain generic placement Not described	
Vitaceae	incertae sedis	"Type 2"	Cevallos-Ferriz & Stockey	A grape family fruit of uncertain generic placement Not described	
Cf. Iridaceae	†Pararisteapollis	†Pararisteapollis stockeyi	Zetter & Hesse	A possible iridaceous pollen morphotype	
Incertae sedis	†Eorhiza	†Eorhiza arnoldii	Robison & Person	A semi-aquatic dicot of uncertain affinity.	
Incertae sedis	†Ethela	†Ethela sargentiana	Erwin & Stockey	A cyperaceous or juncaceous monocot	
Incertae sedis	†Princetonia	†Princetonia allenbyensis	Stockey	A possibly aquatic magnoliopsid flower of uncertain affiliation.	
Incertae sedis	†Soleredera	†Soleredera rhizomorpha	Erwin & Stockey	A lilialean genus of uncertain placement	
