= Dickwhitea =

Dickwhitea Temporal range: 50–49 Ma

Scientific classification
- Kingdom: Plantae
- Clade: Embryophytes
- Clade: Tracheophytes
- Division: Polypodiophyta
- Class: Polypodiopsida
- Order: Polypodiales
- Suborder: Aspleniineae
- Family: Athyriaceae
- Genus: †Dickwhitea; Karafit et al.
- Species: †D. allenbyensis

Binomial name
- †Dickwhitea allenbyensis Karafit et al.

Genus of extinct ferns

Dickwhitea is an extinct morphogenus of lady fern containing a single morphospecies Dickwhitea allenbyensis. The species is known from permineralized remains recovered from the Princeton Chert in British Columbia, Canada. Rhizomes of Dickwhitea are noted for having a sympodial vascular architecture notably similar to Ginkgo biloba and Sequoia sempervirens.

== Distribution ==
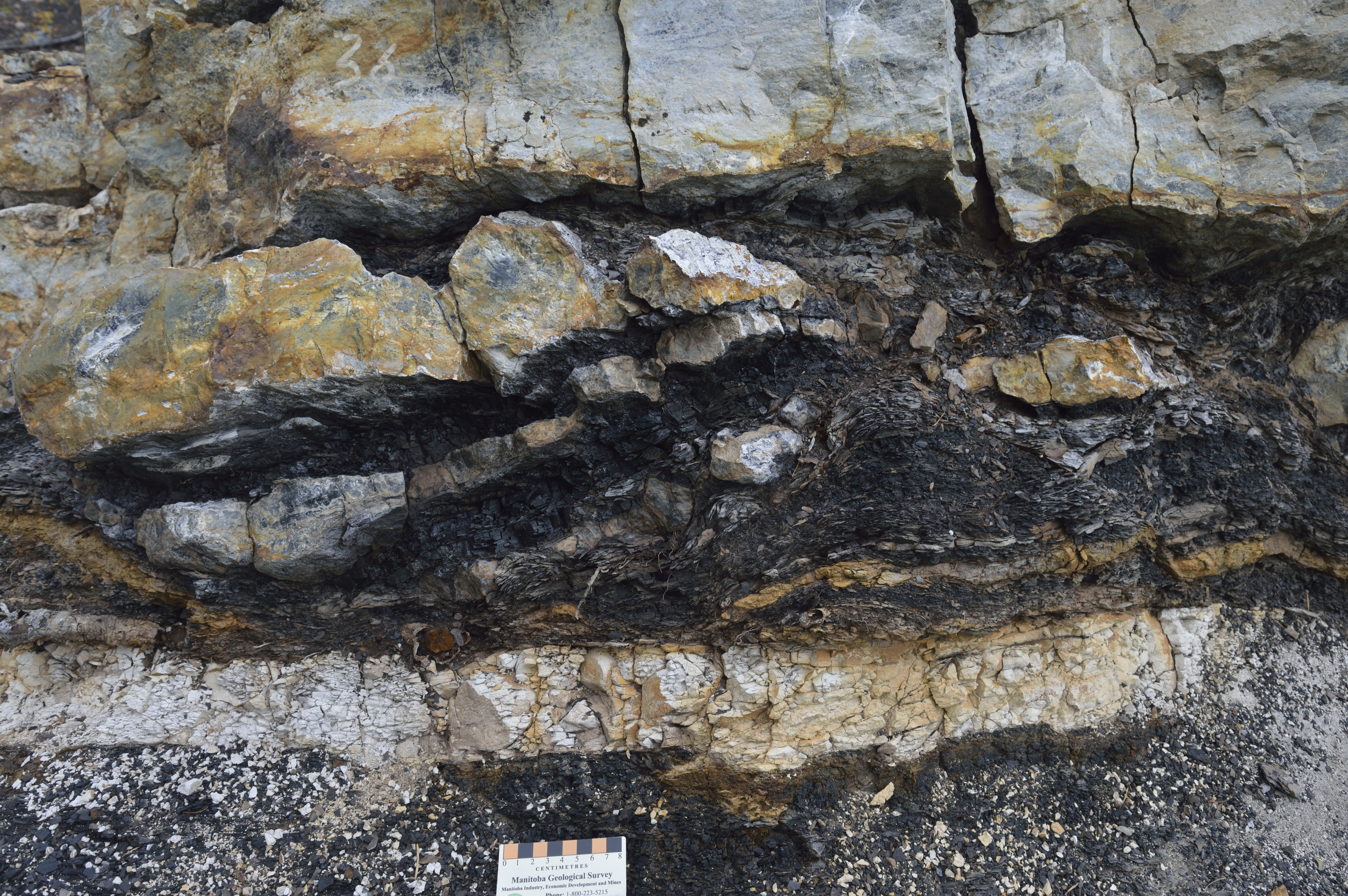
Close up of Princeton Chert outcrop showing volcanic ash (white layer at base), peaty coal (dark layer), and Chert layers (grey).

Dickwhitea is known exclusively from the Princeton Chert, a fossil locality in British Columbia, Canada, which comprises an anatomically preserved flora of Eocene Epoch age, with rich species abundance and diversity. The chert is located in exposures of the Allenby Formation on the east bank of the Similkameen River, 8.5 km (5.3 mi) south of the town of Princeton, British Columbia.

Notable in conjunction with the coal seams of the Allenby Formation are sections of chert which formed during silica-rich periods. The rapid cyclical changes from coal to chert and back are not noted in any other fossil locality in the world. An estimated 49 coal-chert cycles are known, though the exact conditions for this process are not well understood. Silica-rich volcanic episodes in the region during deposition would have been needed for formation of the cherts, while slowly moving waters and gently subsiding terrains would be needed for the peats and fens to accumulate. Rates of organic deposition in swamps have been estimated at 0.5–1 mm (0.02–0.04 in) in modern temperate climates, this suggests the time needed for each 10–20 cm (4–8 in) chert layer would be at least 100 years or more, with the full sequence of cycles taking place over no more than 15,000 years.

The Allenby Formation is one of the southern-most of the Eocene Okanagan Highlands Lagerstätten in British Columbia, with the Canadian Penticton Group at the international border and the Klondike Mountain Formation of Republic, Washington in northern Ferry County to the south. The highlands, including the Allenby Formation, have been described as one of the "Great Canadian Lagerstätten" based on the diversity, quality and unique nature of the biotas that are preserved. The Eocene Okanagan Highlands temperate-subtropical biome preserved across a large transect of lakes recorded many of the earliest appearances of modern genera, while also documenting the last stands of ancient lines.

== History and classification ==
The fossil material was all derived from a single block of chert, number P1080, which was collected from outcrops of the Princeton chert approximately 630 m (2,070 ft) above the Princeton black coal seam. Within the block two rhizomes with associated and isolated adventitious roots and stipes. A paleobotanical team led by Steven Karafit used cellulose acetate peels with hydrofluoric acid to create serial thin sections of the fossils for anatomical and cellular study. The blocks, slabs and microscope slides were accessioned into the University of Alberta palaeobotanical collections. The formal description of the new genus and species was published by Karafit et al. (2006) in the International Journal of Plant Sciences, with the genus name Dickwhitea being chosen as a patronym honoring fern systematist Richard "Dick" White in recognition of his work on fern vascular anatomy and the specific name allenbyensis coined from Allenby, British Columbia, the ghost town that the Allenby Formation takes its name from.

Karafit et al. considered the morphogenus in the same family as Makotopteris princetonensis, another Princeton Chert fern, based on the overall structure of the rhizome and the paired Onoclea-type stipes of the leaves. The stele features seen in D. allenbyensis are found in both Athyriaceae and Dryopteridaceae, and the placement into Athyriaceae was not discussed by the authors.

== Description ==
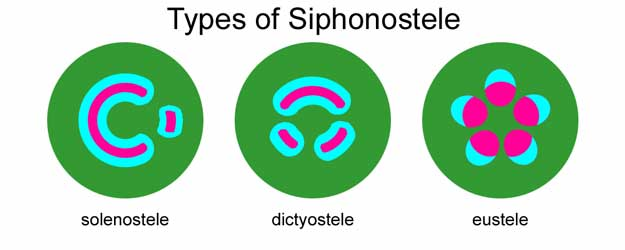
Vascular diagram with Eustele arrangement (right)

Dickwhitea allenbyensis is known only from 6–7 mm (0.24–0.28 in) wide radial rhizomes, the longest preserved section being just over 9.0 cm (3.5 in) long. The rhizomes have a relatively long internodal structure which was suggested to be around 1 cm (0.39 in) long due to the fragmentary fossils usually only showing one stipe in the preserved length. The longest specimen recorded was to distorted and incomplete to measure the internodal length with certainty. Both attached and isolated roots, along with the frond stipes are known. The rhizomes have a radial symmetry with roots and stipes growing in helical arrangement all the way around the rhizome circumference. The frond bases are arranged along the rhizome in an 2/5 phyllotactic helix succession. In cross section the 2–3 mm (0.079–0.118 in) wide stipes show a distorted square outline with rounded corners and lacking a grove along the upper surface. Due to the nature of the preservation within the chert, none of the upper portions of D. allenbyensis, specifically fronds or spores, is known. The roots grade from the epidermal layer into sclerenchyma cells and then to parenchyma cells in the cortex and pith. The pith is between 2.9–4.6 mm (0.11–0.18 in) wide comprised of tightly packed parenchyma. In areas where the preservation is good, the parenchyma cells appear to lack internal contents. The cauline vascular bundles are vessel groups that extend outwards from the central xylem. The roots are adventitious along the rhizome and have a diarch xylem vessel structure, with the oldest xylem cells forming two lines along the outer sides of the vessel. The stipes have two hippocampiform vascular bundles which originate from cauline vessel bundles next to each other. Each diverging frond base is spaced two cauline vessel bundles away from the next in the radial spiral pattern. This divergent pattern arising from the five radially placed cauline bundles is noted as equivalent to the eustele of ginkgo and conifers like Sequoia sempervirens. This was the fossil evidence for eustele-type vascular arrangement arising in ferns, and confirming the eustele like structure of the modern fern genera Botrychium and Ophioglossum.

== Paleoenvironment ==
The Princeton chert preserves an aquatic system with silica rich slow moving waters which was likely a peat fen ecosystem. While other fossil producing areas of the Allenby Formation are likely the product of deep water deposition and diatomite sedimentation, the chert layers originate from shallow waters, as evidenced by plant and animal fossils. The Okanagan Highland sites, such as the Princeton chert represent upland lake systems that were surrounded by a warm temperate ecosystem with nearby volcanism. The highlands likely had a mesic upper microthermal to lower mesothermal climate, in which winter temperatures rarely dropped low enough for snow and which were seasonably equitable. The Okanagan Highlands paleoforest surrounding the lakes have been described as precursors to the modern temperate broadleaf and mixed forests of Eastern North America and Eastern Asia. Based on the fossil biotas, the lakes were higher and cooler than the coeval coastal forests preserved in the Puget Group and Chuckanut Formation of Western Washington, which are described as lowland tropical forest ecosystems. Estimates of the paleoelevation range between 0.7–1.2 km (0.43–0.75 mi) higher than the coastal forests. This is consistent with the paleoelevation estimates for the lake systems, which range between 1.1–2.9 km (1,100–2,900 m), which is similar to the modern elevation of 0.8 km (0.50 mi) but higher.

Estimates of the mean annual temperature have been derived from climate leaf analysis multivariate program (CLAMP) analysis and leaf margin analysis (LMA) of the Princeton paleoflora. The CLAMP results after multiple linear regressions for Princeton's gave a 5.1 °C (41.2 °F), and the LMA returned a mean annual temperature of 5.1 ± 2.2 °C (41.2 ± 4.0 °F). This is lower than the mean annual temperature estimates given for the coastal Puget Group, which is estimated to have been between 15–18.6 °C (59.0–65.5 °F). The bioclimatic analysis for Princeton suggest mean annual precipitation amount of 114 ± 42 cm (45 ± 17 in).

The warm temperate uplands floras of the Allenby Formation and greater highlands in association with downfaulted lacustrine basins and active volcanism are noted to have no exact modern equivalents. This is due to the more seasonally equitable conditions of the Early Eocene, resulting in much lower seasonal temperature shifts. However, the highlands have been compared to the upland ecological islands in the Virunga Mountains within the Albertine Rift of the African rift valley.
