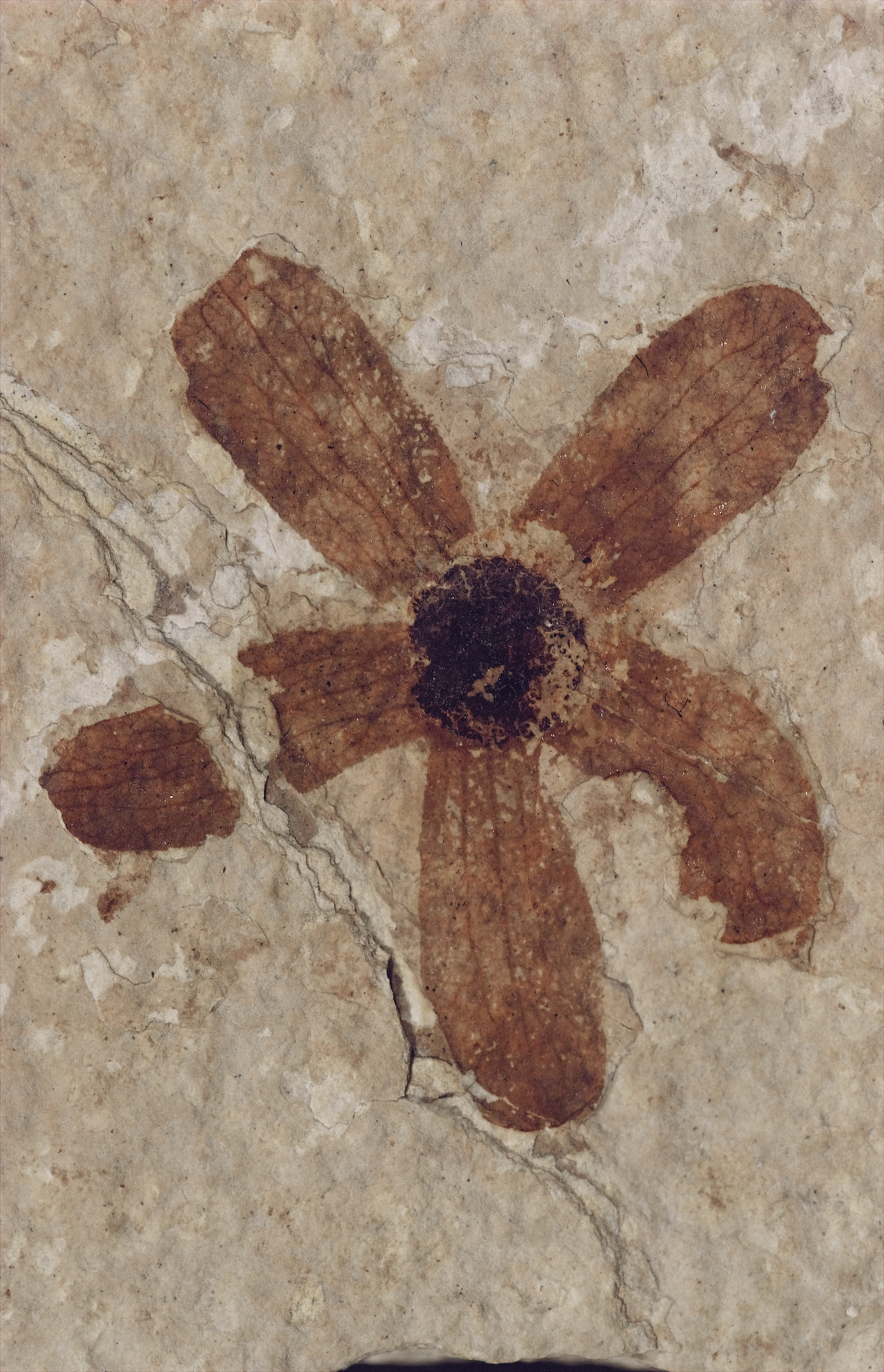
- Fossilized fruit Chaneya tenuis with center seed and five wings

Scientific classification
- Kingdom: Plantae
- Clade: Tracheophytes
- Clade: Angiosperms
- Clade: Eudicots
- Clade: Rosids
- Order: Sapindales
- Genus: †Chaneya; Wang & Manchester, 2000

Species
- Chaneya hainanensis; Chaneya kokangensis; Chaneya oeningensis; Chaneya membranosa; Chaneya ningmingensis; Chaneya palaeogaea; Chaneya tenuis

= Chaneya =

Chaneya Temporal range: Cenozoic 66-5 Ma

Extinct genus of fruits

Chaneya is an extinct genus of fruit from the early to late Cenozoic period. This genus is known from seven fossil species discovered across North America, Asia and Europe.

== History and classification ==
Fossils currently assigned to Chaneya species have been reported from Europe, North America and East Asia. The European reports originated in 1825 with Karl Koenig publishing Viburnum oeningense. That was followed by Heinrich Göppert's Getonia membranosa (1855) and Baron Constantin von Ettingshausen's Diospyros palaeogaea (1868). While the last species was not reassigned until 2011, the other were reclassified respectively twice and four times.

The genus name Chaneya was coined by Yufei Wang and Steven Manchester as a patronym honoring the American paleobotanist Ralph Works Chaney, who provided the first description of the species in Shanwang formation Antholithes malvoides in 1937 while collecting specimens of Miocene Shanwang flora on behalf of the Geological Survey of China. Chaney would come to be considered a pioneer in the field of paleobotany regarding the comparative study of Chinese and North American Tertiary floras.

== Description ==
The genus of this flower is five-lobed, hypogynous, widely concave, rounded apices. One or two fruit bodies develop near the centre. The petals have been described by researchers Y. Wang and S.R. Manchester as having "winged" properties, for the purpose of eased wind dispersal. Gynoecium apocarpous are formed by two alternating whorls of stamen and ovary, as bisexual flowers in the species Chaneya tenuis, Chaneya kokangensis, Chaneya membranosa and Chaneya hainanensis.

On the contrary, the species Chaneya oeningensis has a single whorl of female ovary. The sepals show venation with three to five main, subparallel longitudinal veins, including a prominent midvein and secondary veins arising at acute angles. Precise systematic placement has proven difficult, as no specific leaf type has been assigned. This complication could be due to the likelihood that the leaves were not as easily dispersed by the wind as fruits or flowers were. Although the precise systematic position of Chaneya remains uncertain, features such as its (reinterpreted) floral morphology, apocarpous superior gynoecium, floral disc and oil cells in the petals suggest a relationship to the order Sapindales, particularly the families Simaroubaceae and Rutaceae.

=== Chaneya tenuis ===
This fruit is a Samara measuring between 22 and 34.5 mm (0.87 and 1.36 in) in diameter, with an average diameter of 27 mm (1.1 in). It has near equal lobes, each roughly 13 mm (0.51 in) long and 5.3 mm (0.21 in) width, with entire margins and an elliptical to obovate shape. Two alternating whorls of five carpels form smooth outer fruit bodies between 6 and 8 mm in diameter, situated near the margins of a thickened disc. There are small, undeveloped and possibly abortive ovaries, but plant cuticles are unknown. Although this species morphologically resembles a flower, it is nevertheless interpreted as a fruit with five petal-like wings.

The species has been identified from a number of fossil locations across western North America, with the oldest dating to the Early Eocenes (Ypresian) age in Wyoming's Green River Formation and Oregon's Clarno Formation. The fossils are also found near Canada's Pacific coast, including in the Eocene Okanagan Highlands at the Allenby Formation at (Whipsaw Creek, British Columbia) and the McAbee Fossil Beds near Cache Creek, British Columbia. The youngest occurrence in North America is from the Priabonian Florissant Formation of Colorado. Two localities in China are also host to Chaneya tenuis: the Yilan and Shanwang floras.

The species was first named as Porana tenuis by Leo Lesquereux in 1883, and includes specimens later listed as Porana cockerelli by Frank Hall Knowlton (1916) and Astronium truncatum by Harry MacGinitie (1953).

=== Chaneya hainanensis ===
Chaneya hainanensis is distinguished by a wing venation consisting of three primary, longitudinal subparallel veins and two fruit bodies. The species was detailed in 2012 by Xinxin Feng and Jianhua Jin based on specimens collected at the Changchang Formation of Hainan Island in southern China. The sediments of the region are dated to the Eocene Epoch, with Fang and Jin noting that palynological evidence suggests an age range between the Early to early Late Eocene eras. At the time of description, the holotype specimen (CCF-018a&b), was deposited in the Biological Museum of Sun Yat-sen University in Guangzhou, China. The species name was selected as a toponym referencing to Hainan as the type locality.

=== Chaneya kokangensis ===
The infructescence is a raceme with a 0.8 mm thick and 18 mm long pedicel. The corolla's diameter is between 28 and 40 mm (an average of 36.3 mm), with sepals between 12 and 21 mm long and 5 and 10 mm wide. The sepals have entire margins and an elliptical to obovate shape and indicate well-preserved venation, consisting of five main subparallel longitudinal veins. Two alternating whorls of five carpels (which form smooth outer surface fruit bodies about 9 mm in diameter) are located near the margins of a thickened disc and can be distinguished by clear stomates and well-preserved cuticles.Chaneya tenuis differs on account of its larger petals.

Miocene fossils have been documented from the Kogeonweon coal field, Hoeryong in North Hamgyong Province, North Korea, and the Shanwang formation at Shanwang Village, Linju County, Shandong Province, China.

==== Synonymy ====
The species has been classified under several different names in academic literature. The below list of names are now considered taxonomic synonym or wrongfully applied identifications of the same taxon.

- Porana kokengensis (1939)
- Antholithes malvoides (1940)
- Porana macrantha (1993)
- Astronium truncatum (auct., non Lesquereux ex MacGintie, Working Group of Cenozoic Plants of China [WGCPC], 1978).

=== Chaneya oeningensis ===
This is species is described as Chenaya oeningensis by V. Teodoridis and Z. Kvaček. It has a corolla of approximately 22 mm in diameter, with petals roughly 10 mm long and 5 mm wide. In contrast to other species it consists of a single whorl of a gynoecium of five carpels alternating with sepals, and it is relatively large in size. Glandular cavities are featured in dark spots within smaller resinous bodies in the petal tissues. The venation is distinct, with several main veins arising at the base, running subparallel across the lobes. Weaker secondary veins steeply ascend towards the apex. Its petals are broader than those of Chaneya tenuis but narrower than those of Chaneya membranosa.

==== Locality ====
The species has been identified in Early Palaeogene deposits in Bikaner and Barmer (Rajasthan, India) and Middle Miocene deposits in Europe, including southwestern Germany (Öhningen) and the Most Basin in the Czech Republic.

==== Synonymy ====
Much like other chaneya species, chaneya oeningensis has been labelled under various scientific names in historical academic literature. It was first called both Antholithus oeningensis by AIexander Braun and Franz Unger (1845 and 1847) and Cordia tiliaefolia (1845). Taxonomical literature in the next decade and a half placed it in Getonia oeningensis (1847,1850), Porana oeningensis by Unger and Oswald Heer (1859) and Petraea oeningensis by Braun and Heer (1859).

Subsequent taxonomic classification placed the species as Porana macrantha by Heer (1859, 1904) Porana inaequiloba (Heer, 1859), Monotes macranthus (Heer and Hermann Weyland, 1937), Astronium macranthum (Heer, Irina A. Iljinskaja and M.A. Akhmetiev, 1989) and Astronium oeningensis (1989, 1993).

=== Chaneya membranosa ===
The species is known from the late Miocene Sośnica flora (formerly called Schossnitz in older literature), from Sośnica, Lower Silesian Voivodeship, Poland. It was initially named as Getonia membranosa by Göppert (1855), then moved to Porana membranosa by Wilhelm Schimper (1872) and following that Hydrangea membranosa by Jie Mei Xu (1985). In the initial reclassification of Chaneya oeningensis, the Polish fossils were included. Nonetheless, an investigation by Manchester and Ewa Zastawniak (2007) concluded that they represent a separate species. Their study also deemed the species Getonia truncata, Carpinus involvens, and Diospyros brachysepala as junior synonyms of Chaneya membranosa.

=== Chaneya ninmengensis ===
This species is characterised as a flower lacking a calyx and possessing subequal-sized petals.

==== Locality ====
Oligocene deposits were found in the village of Gaoling, Ningming County, Guangxi Zhuang Autonomous Region, China.

=== Chaneya palaeogaea ===
Fossils of Chaneya palaeogaea were described from Late Eocene sediments outcropping at Kučlín near Bílina in northwestern Czech Republic. The specimens were first described by Baron von Ettingshausen in 1868, who classified the new species as Diospyros palaeogaea, assuming a relationship to ebonies and persimmons. This classified stood until 2011 when the flora was redescribed by Zlatko Kvaček and Vasilis Teodoridis, who reassigned the fossils as Chaneya fruits.
