= Allenbya =

Allenbya is the scientific name of two genera of organisms and may refer to:

- Allenbya (insect), a genus of prehistoric insects in the order Odonata
- Allenbya (plant), a genus of prehistoric plants in the family Nymphaeaceae
