= Whipsaw (disambiguation) =

A whipsaw was originally a type of saw used in a saw pit, and consisted of a narrow blade held rigid by a frame and called a frame saw or sash saw.

Whipsaw may also refer to:

- Whipsaw (film), 1935
- Whipsaw Creek, in British Columbia, Canada
- Whipsaw strike, a strike by a trade union
