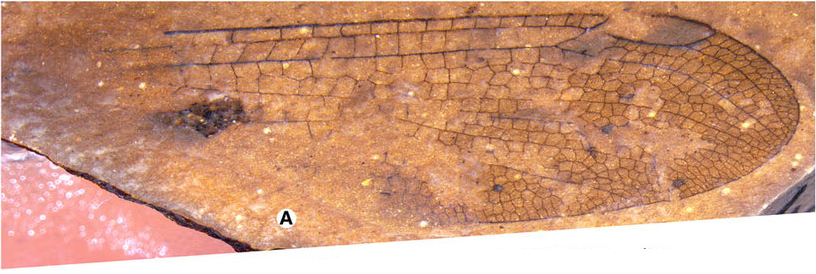
- holotype wing

Scientific classification
- Kingdom: Animalia
- Phylum: Arthropoda
- Clade: Pancrustacea
- Class: Insecta
- Order: Odonata
- Family: †Dysagrionidae (?)
- Genus: †Allenbya; Archibald & Cannings, 2022
- Species: †A. holmesae

Binomial name
- †Allenbya holmesae Archibald & Cannings, 2022

= Allenbya holmesae =

Allenbya holmesae Temporal range: late Ypresian ~51–50 Ma

Extinct genus of damselflies

Allenbya is an extinct odonate genus possibly in the damselfly-like family Dysagrionidae with the single included species Allenbya holmesae. The genus was first described in 2022 from an Early Eocene Okanagan Highlands site in western North America. The species is known from the late Ypresian sediments exposed around Princeton in Central British Columbia.

== Distribution ==
Allenbya holmesae has been recovered from a single location in the Eocene Okanagan Highlands, the type locality being on an exposure of the Allenby Formations Vermilion Bluffs shale unit 4 km (2.5 mi) south Princeton, British Columbia. The formation has a long history of insect fossil collection, with the earliest Okanagan Highlands specimens being collected by the George Mercer Dawson party in 1877 and reported in 1879. The age of the Allenby Formation was debated for many years, with fish and insect fossils hinting at an Eocene age, while mammal and plant fossils suggested a Late Oligocene or Early Miocene age. The lake sediments at Princeton were radiometrically dated using the K-Ar method in the 1960s based on ash samples exposed in the lake bed. These samples yielded an age of ~48 million years ago; however, dating published in 2005 provided a ^{40}Ar-^{39}Ar radiometric date placing some Princeton sites at 52.08 ± 0.12 million years ago.

Additional Cephalozygoptera/Zygoptera fossils have been reported from the Eocene Okanagan Highlands at the Tranquille Formations McAbee Fossil Beds northwest of Princeton, and from the Klondike Mountain Formation around Republic, Washington to the Southeast.

== History and classification ==
The holotype, specimen GSC 142948, was collected on 19 October 2021 by Beverley Burlingame and subsequently donated to the Geological Survey of Canada where it was accessioned. At the time of description it had been made part of the "National Collection of Invertebrate and Plant Fossil Types". The specimen was studied by S. Bruce Archibald and Robert Cannings with a formal description being published in The Canadian Entomologist in 2022. This would be the third descriptive paper on Eocene Okanagan Highlands Odonates they published, following one on the dragonflies in 2019 and "damselflies" in 2021. The new genus Allenbya was named by Archibald and Cannings as a reference to the Allenby Formation, and not as a reference to the ghost town Allenby for which the formation and the fossil waterlily genus Allenbya were named. The species name was coined as a matronym of Beverley Burlingame's mother Dorothy Bradbeer of Agriculture Canada. Archibald and Cannings chose her surname "Holmes" and explained it was in honor of Bradbeer cultivating a love of fossils and insects in Burlingame.

In their initial description Archibald and Cannings noted that the incomplete nature of the fossil left room for classification changes if more complete specimens were recovered. In the preserved section of the holotype, the MA, MP, and CuA veins were deemed to be of similar positions and progressions up the wing as seen in the Dysagrionidae genera Okanopteryx and Stenodiafanus described the year earlier from Republic and McAbee. Due to the missing area of the wing being the basal region, they opted to maintain a conservative stance on the higher taxonomic affiliations and deemed Allenbya as cf. Dysagrionidae. This placement uncertainty was retained

The subordinal placement of Dysagrionidae is controversial. Until 2021 the family had been treated as likely belonging to the living odonate suborder Zygoptera, however the known head morphology of the included species has led to occasional placement questions. The Cretaceous dysagrionid genus Congqingia has had affiliation with the suborder Anisozygoptera and Dysagrionidae has been noted to be Zygoptera(?) on occasion. Archibald, Cannings, and Robert Erickson evaluated the known head morphology of the fossils and concluded that they did not belong to any of the three defined odonate suborders, but instead were part of a new suborder they named Cephalozygoptera. The suborder was based on the zygopteran body plan, but considered distinct due to the eye to head capsule structure and distances. Unlike zygopterans where the head is 3–5 times as wide as long, in cephalozygopterans the heads are only around double as wide as long making them narrower then in any zygopterans. The distance between the eyes in cephalozygopterans, at about one eye width, was also suggested to be different from known zygopterans where the width is typically at more than doubled. The erection of Cephalozygoptera was criticized by Andre Nel and Darren Zheng (2021) who argued that the noted differences were due in part to deformation of the head and eye areas during deposition and fossilization combined with characters that are present in a larger group of odonates than Archibald, Cannings, and Erickson reported. Based on their review and critique of the justifications for cephalozygoptera, Nel and Zhang considered the name and grouping unwarranted and proposed it to be treated as a synonym of Zygoptera. Archibald and Cannings (2021) responded to the arguments, maintaining that Cephalozygoptera as valid. In subsequent papers both suborders have been used, depending on if the author group includes Archibald or Nel.

== Description ==
The wing of Allenbya holmesae as preserved is hyaline for the basal 2/3 and darkened in the apical 1/3. The space between the RP1 and RP2 veins is narrower then seen in other Dysagrionidae genera, and due to the narrow spacing, a visible IR1 vein is not developed. With other dysagrionids, the IR1 is always present, with at least a traceable zig-zagged path if not a robust vein. Present in the wing is a strong pterostigmal brace vein that is more robust than seen in any other dysagrionid genera when it is present at all. The pterostigma itself is considered large for the wing size, with a length suggested as about 1/3 the estimated maximum wing width if it had been complete. The overall pterostigmal shape is of an elongate rectangle with a curved hind margin. The space apical of the pterostigma between the RA–RP1 vein and wing margin contain up to three cells stacked from margin to RA–RP1 and formed by crossveins. This is not seen in any other dysagrionid genera besides Okanagrion and Valerea. However, neither of those genera have a pterostigmal brace vein, separating A. holmesae from those genera.

== Paleoenvironment ==
The Okanagan Highland sites represent upland lake systems that were surrounded by a warm temperate ecosystem with nearby volcanism. The highlands likely had a mesic upper microthermal to lower mesothermal climate, in which winter temperatures rarely dropped low enough for snow, and which were seasonably equitable. The Okanagan Highlands paleoforest surrounding the lakes have been described as precursors to the modern temperate broadleaf and mixed forests of Eastern North America and Eastern Asia. Based on the fossil biotas the lakes were higher and cooler than the coeval coastal forests preserved in the Puget Group and Chuckanut Formation of Western Washington, which are described as lowland tropical forest ecosystems. Estimates of the paleoelevation range between 0.7–1.2 km (0.43–0.75 mi) higher than the coastal forests. This is consistent with the paleoelevation estimates for the lake systems, which range between 1.1–2.9 km (1,100–2,900 m), which is similar to the modern elevation 0.8 km (0.50 mi), but higher.

Estimates of the mean annual temperature have been derived from climate leaf analysis multivariate program (CLAMP) analysis and leaf margin analysis (LMA) the Princeton paleoflora. The CLAMP results after multiple linear regressions for Princeton's gave a 5.1 °C (41.2 °F), and the LMA returned a mean annual temperature of 5.1 ± 2.2 °C (41.2 ± 4.0 °F). This is lower than the mean annual temperature estimates given for the coastal Puget Group, which is estimated to have been between 15–18.6 °C (59.0–65.5 °F). The bioclimatic analysis for Princeton suggest mean annual precipitation amount of 114 ± 42 cm (45 ± 17 in).
