= Allenbya collinsonae =

Allenbya collinsonae Temporal range: Late Ypresian ~51–49 Ma

Scientific classification
- Kingdom: Plantae
- Clade: Embryophytes
- Clade: Tracheophytes
- Clade: Spermatophytes
- Clade: Angiosperms
- Order: Nymphaeales
- Family: Nymphaeaceae
- Genus: †Allenbya; Cevallos-Ferriz & Stockey
- Species: †A. collinsonae

Binomial name
- †Allenbya collinsonae Cevallos-Ferriz & Stockey

Fossil species of aquatic plant

Allenbya is an extinct genus of water lilies in the family Nymphaeaceae containing a single species Allenbya collinsonae. The species is known from permineralized remains recovered from the Early Eocene Princeton Chert in British Columbia, Canada.

== Distribution ==
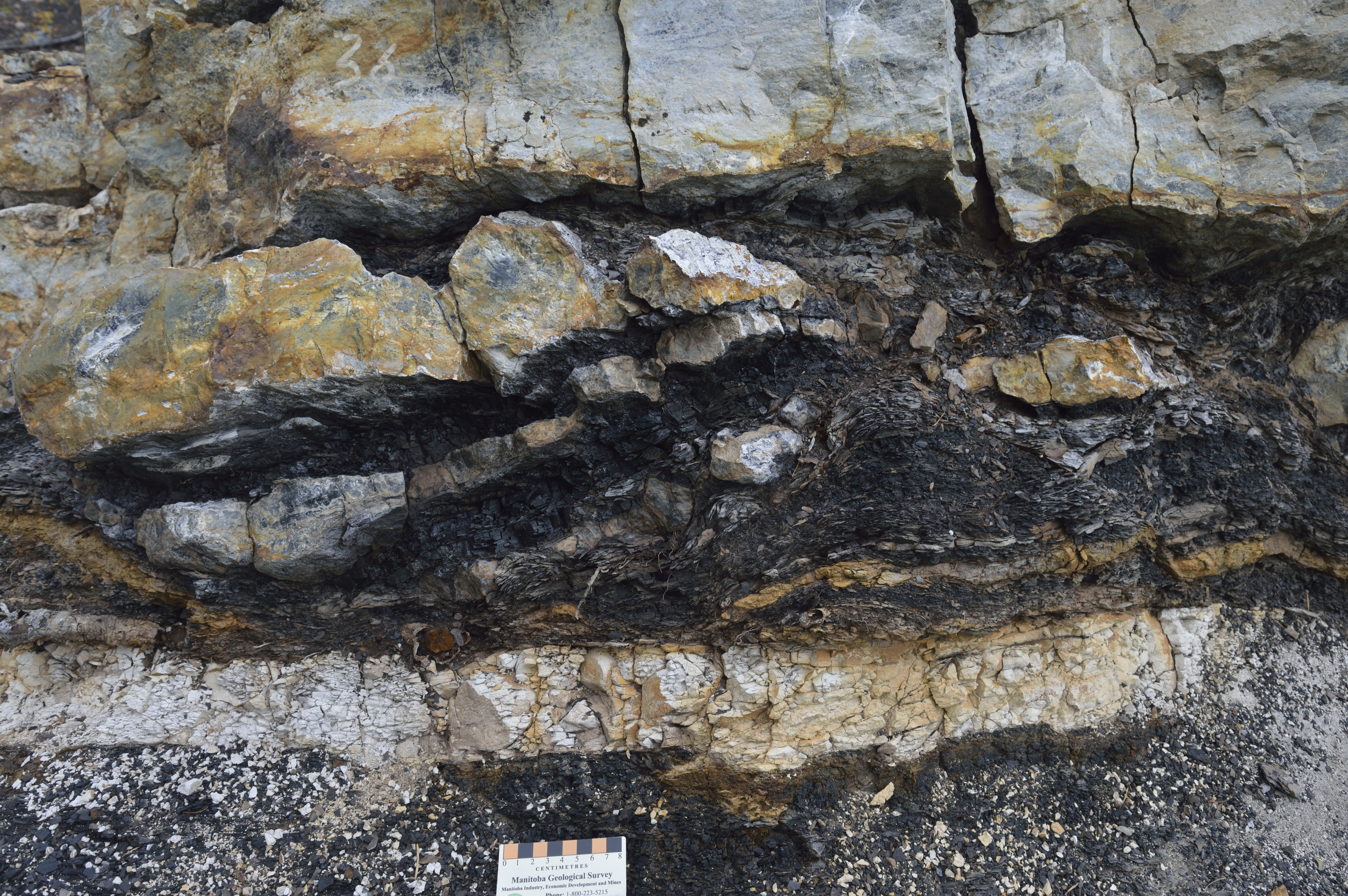
Close up of Princeton Chert outcrop showing volcanic ash (white layer at base), peaty coal (dark layer), and Chert layers (grey)

Allenbya collinsonae is known exclusively from the Princeton Chert, a fossil locality in British Columbia, Canada, that contains an anatomically preserved flora of Eocene Epoch age, with rich species abundance and diversity. The chert is located in exposures of the Allenby Formation on the east bank of the Similkameen River, 8.5 km (5.3 mi) south of the town of Princeton, British Columbia.

Notable in conjunction with the coal seams of the Allenby Formation are sections of chert which formed during silica-rich periods. The rapid cyclical changes from coal to chert and back are not noted in any other fossil locality in the world. An estimated 49 coal/chert cycles are known and the time needed for each 10–20 cm (3.9–7.9 in) chert layer would be at least 100 years or more, with the full sequence of cycles taking place over no more than 15,000 years.

The Allenby Formation is one of the southernmost of the Eocene Okanagan Highlands lakes in British Columbia and second most southern site after the Klondike Mountain Formation of Republic, Washington, in northern Ferry County. In British Columbia, the formation is coeval to the Tranquille Formation, known from the McAbee Fossil Beds and Falkland site, the Coldwater Beds, known from the Quilchena site, and Driftwood Canyon Provincial Park. The highlands, including the Allenby Formation, have been described as one of the "Great Canadian Lagerstätten" based on the diversity, quality and unique nature of the biotas that are preserved. The highlands temperate biome preserved across a large transect of lakes recorded many of the earliest appearances of modern genera, while also documenting the last stands of ancient lines.

== History and classification ==
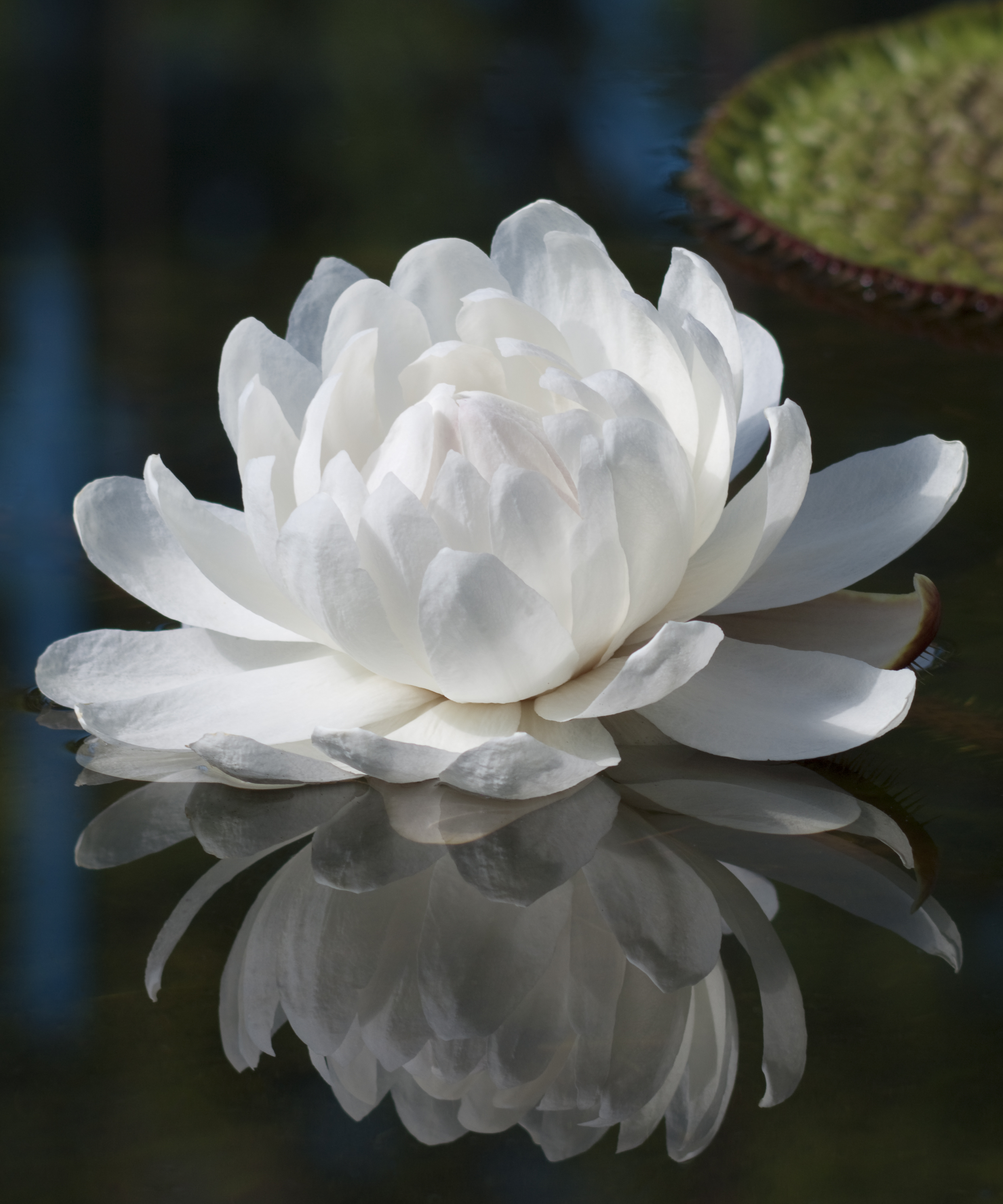
Living Victoria amazonica flower

The fossils were first studied by Sergio R. S. Cevallos-Ferriz and Ruth A. Stockey in the late 1980s who used cellulose acetate peels with hydrofluoric acid to create serial thin sections of the chert blocks. The peels where then examined for anatomical and cellular details, with the slide mounts being accessioned into the University of Alberta palaeobotanical collections. The genus and species description were based on the holotype, P3678 E bot & F top, a peel of an inferred seed pod, plus a series of four paratype seed peels, P 2144 H top, P 2328 C bot, P 2511 C bot, and P 2581 E bot. The generic name Allenbya is a toponym referring to ghost town Allenby, British Columbia, for which the Allenby Formation is named, while the damselfly genus Allenbya is named for the formation itself and not the town. The specific epithet collinsonae honours Margaret E. Collinson for her work with review work in nymphalean seed fossils. At the time of description A. collinsonae was placed in the family Nymphaeaceae, and was suggested by Cevallos-Ferriz and Stockey to be an early member of the lineage leading to the modern giant waterlily genus Victoria. The lineage also possibly includes the Turonian (Cretaceous) genus Microvictoria from the Raritan Formation in New Jersey, though that placement has been questioned. Allenbya collinsonae seeds are noted to be bigger than those of the related Susiea newsalemae from the Paleocene Sentinel Butte Formation of Almont, North Dakota, which are also more barrel-shaped.

== Description ==
The single identified fruit of Allenbya collinsonae is incomplete, with only 2.5 cm (0.98 in) long section present in the holotype. The section is likely the basal area of the fruit, with a 3.6 mm (0.14 in) long axis at the base being interpreted as possibly the fruit pedicel. The fruit wall consists of a mesocarp layer around eight cells wide between a single cell layer of exocarp and single cell layer of endocarp. The cells in both exocarp and endocarp are dark in preservation color and rectangular in cross section. The fruit is follicle-like and containing a single row of four seeds which grew from a perisperm.

The seeds are 6.0–7.0 mm (0.24–0.28 in) long by 3.0–3.5 mm (0.12–0.14 in) in diameter with a generally ovoid to almost spheroidal outline. The outer surface is interpreted as being smooth with a slightly undulatory texture and they have an operculum at the micropylar end. The seed coat consists of an out palisade cell layer, an inner layer of integument cells and a middle layer of one to two cells. The outer palisade cells are "sinuous" in shape, undulating approximately four to ten times from outer to inner cell ends and have thickened cell walls. The middle layer of cells are thin walled, between one and two cells deep, each with a rectangular outline. The inner integument cell layer is like the middle layer, being one to two cells thick and having thin cell walls. The inner layer however is connected to the seed wall only at the chalazal end of the seed. The seeds are vascularized by a single bundle of vessels found underneath the palisade layer of the integument. The vessel form a ridge from chalaza to the hilum which is placed at the operculum next to the micropyle from which a layer of integument.

== Paleoecology ==
Five years after the initial description of Allenbya collinsonae, a group of paleobotanists led by Ben LePage reported the presence of fungal pathogens in A. collinsonae seeds. While they did not formally name the fungus, they compared the visible morphology to the living genera Alternaria, Ulocladium and Stemphylium. The three genera are closely related "hyphomycetes" making determination of the fossils affiliation hard, but based on the sclerotium, mycelium, and phragmospores, LePage et al considered it most similar to the living Alternaria padwickii. Species of Alternaria are noted crop and food pests responsible for seed and fruit rots, leaf spotting, and plant blights. Cevallos-Ferriz and Stockey noted that, while only one fruit was known, the seeds of A. collinsonae were some of the most common seeds in the Princeton chert, with several thousand known at that time.

== Paleoenvironment ==
The Princeton chert preserves an aquatic system with silica rich slow moving waters which was likely a peat fen ecosystem. While other fossil producing areas of the Allenby Formation are likely the product of deep water deposition and diatomite sedimentation, the chert layers originate from shallow waters, as evidenced by plant and animal fossils. The Okanagan Highland sites, such as the Princeton chert represent upland lake systems that were surrounded by a warm temperate ecosystem with nearby volcanism. The highlands likely had a mesic upper microthermal to lower mesothermal climate, in which winter temperatures rarely dropped low enough for snow and which were seasonably equitable. The Okanagan Highlands paleoforest surrounding the lakes have been described as precursors to the modern temperate broadleaf and mixed forests of Eastern North America and Eastern Asia. Based on the fossil biotas, the lakes were higher and cooler than the coeval coastal forests preserved in the Puget Group and Chuckanut Formation of Western Washington, which are described as lowland tropical forest ecosystems. Estimates of the paleoelevation range between 0.7–1.2 km (0.43–0.75 mi) higher than the coastal forests. This is consistent with the paleoelevation estimates for the lake systems, which range between 1.1–2.9 km (1,100–2,900 m), which is similar to the modern elevation of 0.8 km (0.50 mi) but higher.

Estimates of the mean annual temperature have been derived from climate leaf analysis multivariate program (CLAMP) analysis and leaf margin analysis (LMA) of the Princeton paleoflora. The CLAMP results after multiple linear regressions for Princeton's gave a 5.1 °C (41.2 °F), and the LMA returned a mean annual temperature of 5.1 ± 2.2 °C (41.2 ± 4.0 °F). This is lower than the mean annual temperature estimates given for the coastal Puget Group, which is estimated to have been between 15–18.6 °C (59.0–65.5 °F). The bioclimatic analysis for Princeton suggest mean annual precipitation amount of 114 ± 42 cm (45 ± 17 in).

The warm temperate uplands floras of the Allenby Formation and greater highlands in association with downfaulted lacustrine basins and active volcanism are noted to have no exact modern equivalents. This is due to the more seasonally equitable conditions of the Early Eocene, resulting in much lower seasonal temperature shifts. However, the highlands have been compared to the upland ecological islands in the Virunga Mountains within the Albertine Rift of the African rift valley.
