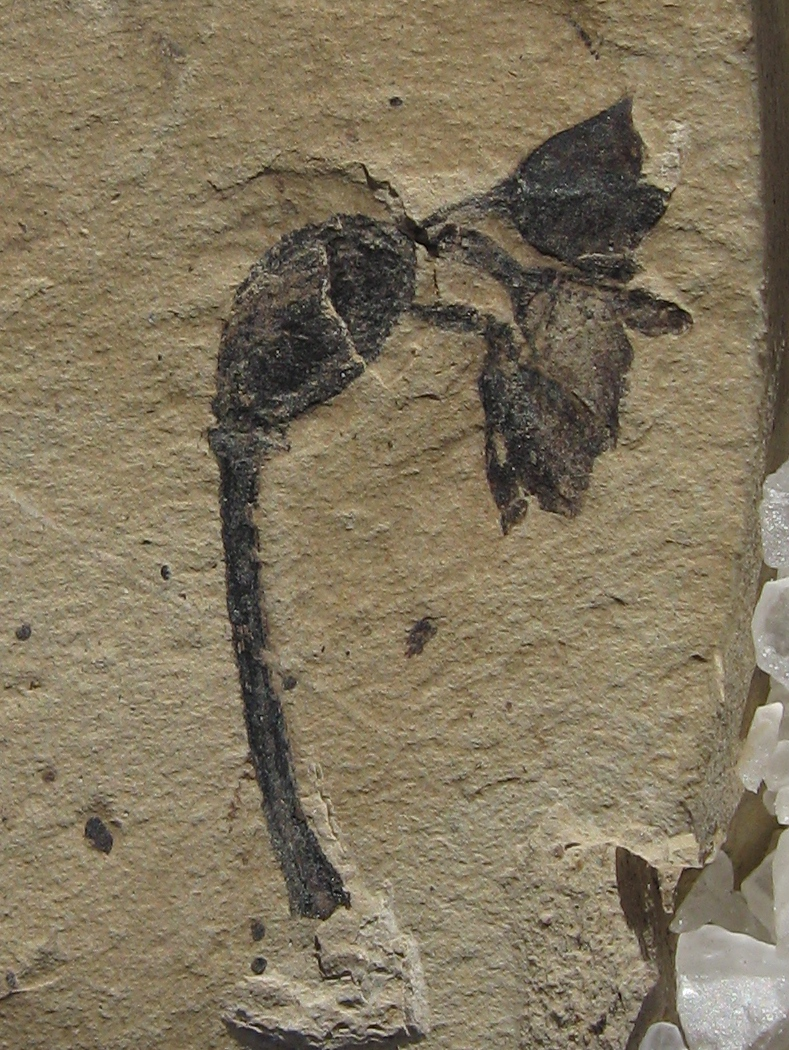
- holotype

Scientific classification
- Kingdom: Plantae
- Clade: Embryophytes
- Clade: Tracheophytes
- Clade: Angiosperms
- Clade: Monocots
- Order: Asparagales
- Family: Amaryllidaceae
- Genus: †Paleoallium; Pigg, Bryan & DeVore, 2018
- Species: †P. billgenseli

Binomial name
- †Paleoallium billgenseli Pigg, Bryan & DeVore, 2018

= Paleoallium =

Paleoallium Temporal range: 50–49 Ma

Genus of extinct ferns

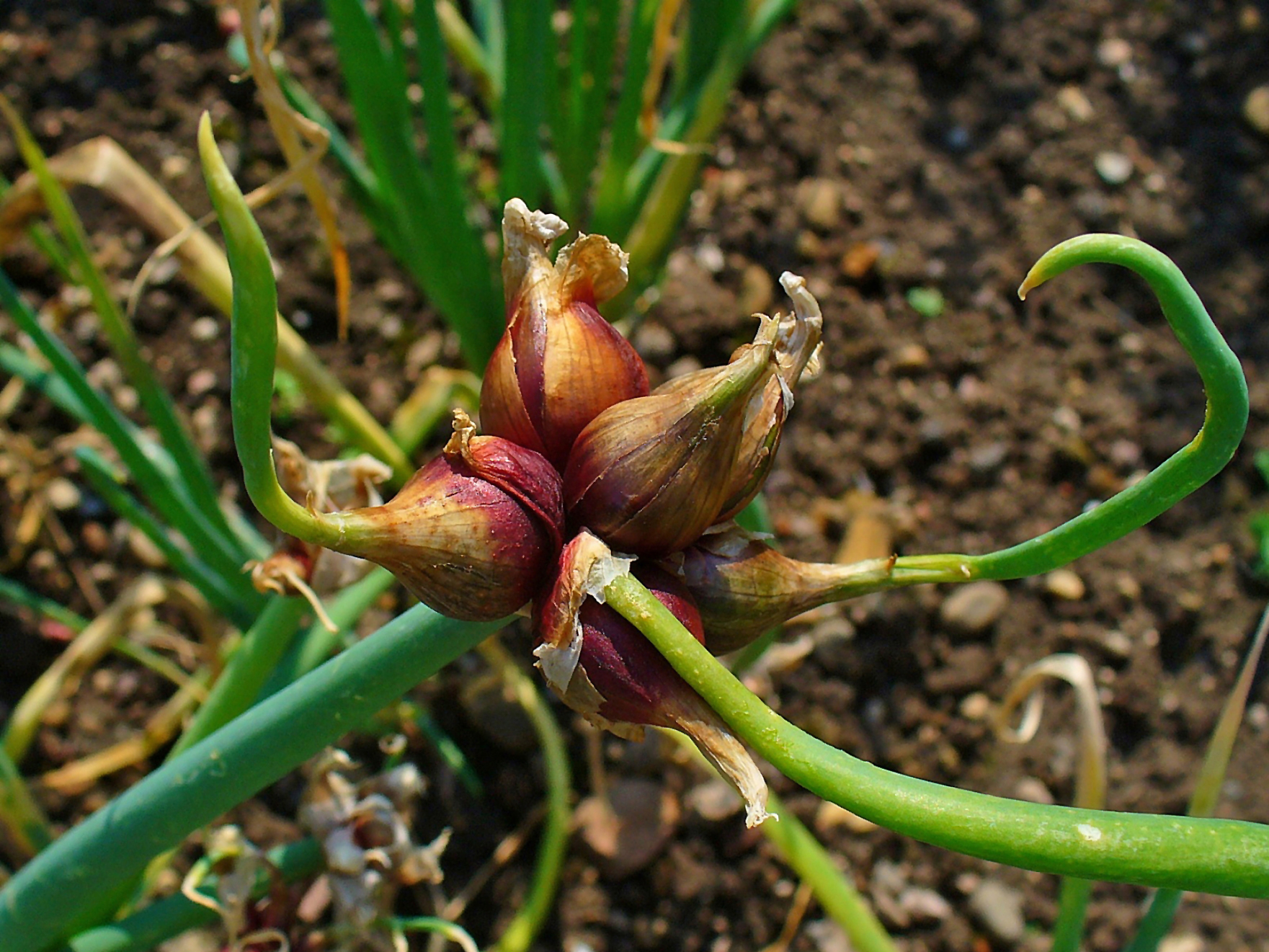
Allium cepa bulbils

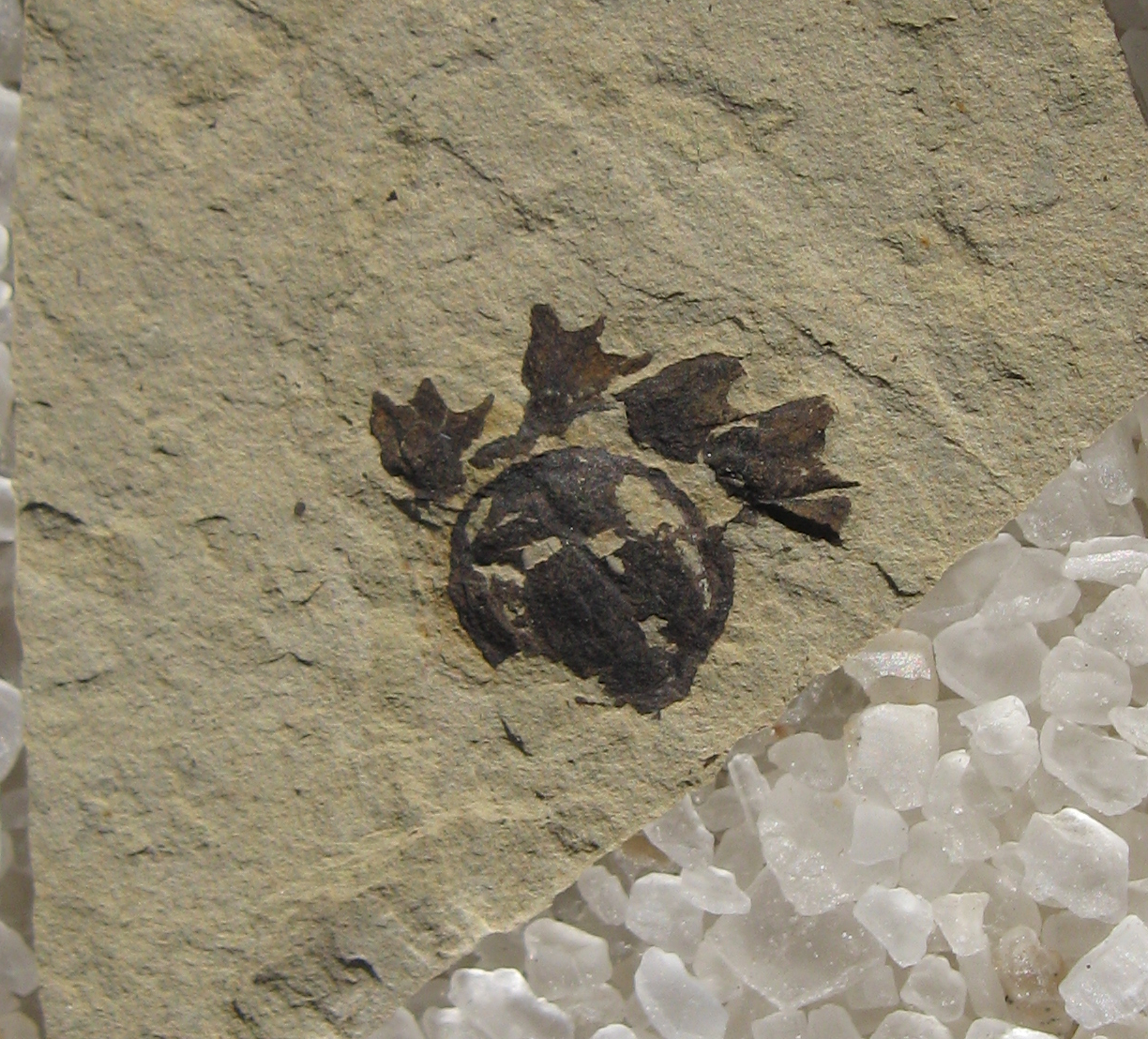
P. billgenseli bulbil & flowers

Paleoallium is an extinct genus of onion-like plant in the family Amaryllidaceae known from the single described species Paleoallium billgenseli. The species is known from Early Eocene sediments exposed in the northeast of the U.S. state of Washington.

== Distribution ==
Paleoallium billgenseli is described from fossils found in a single location in the Eocene Okanagan Highlands, an outcrop of the Ypresian Klondike Mountain Formation in Republic. The type series of fossils, the holotype, paratypes and additional included fossils were recovered from the UWBM site B4131, which is designated the type locality. Modern work on the fossil-bearing strata of the Formation via radiometrically dating has given an estimated age in the Late Ypresian stage of the early Eocene, between 49.4 ± .5 million years ago at the youngest, with an oldest age estimate of 51.2 ± 0.1 million years ago, given based on detrital zircon isotopic data published in 2021.

An additional attributed fossil from the Allenby Formation around Princeton, British Columbia, was noted to be close to Paleoallium, while a series of fossils from the McAbee outcrop near Cache Creek, British Columbia, were noted as possibly similar but would not be addressed by the paper.

== History and classification ==
The first illustration of a fossil was in the 2011 Fossil plants from Republic: a guidebook published for the Stonerose Interpretive Center where specimen SR 08-36-03 was figured as an "additional flower". The Allenby Formation specimen noted as similar to Paleoallium was figured as an "Unknown structure" by Dilhoff et al (2013). A series of the fossils were formally studied by paleobotanists Kathleen Pigg, Finley Bryan, and Melanie DeVore who published their formal description of the genus and species in a 2018 International Journal of Plant Sciences paper. Pigg, Bryan, DeVore designated the holotype as specimen SR 10-35-06, which was in the paleobotanical collections of the Stonerose Interpretive Center in Republic at that time. An additional paratype series of 15 fossils, also from the Stonerose collections, was designated, and one additional fossil, SR 13-004-010 A&B was discussed and figured, but not included in the type series. The genus name Paleoallium was created as a combination of "Allium", the modern garlic & onion genus, plus the prefix paleo-. They noted "Allium" is a reference to the remarkable similarity between the fossils and modern onions, but they specified there is no direct implied relationship between any living species discussed in the paper. The species name billgenseli as a patronym honoring William Gensel, Durham, North Carolina botanist who first pointed to the similarity between alliums and the fossils and for his larger contributions to plant sciences.

Since being described, Paleoallium billgenseli has been used a number of times as a molecular dating calibration point for the origins and divergence of Amaryllidaceae. The genus is noted for being the first Amaryllidaceae from the fossil record.

== Description ==
Paleoallium billgenseli spathes are between 3–8 mm (1/8–3/8 in) wide and 5–12 mm (1/4–1/2 in) long, granting an obovate to elliptically ovate outline. They range from sprouting flat from the scape to sprouting at a right angle to the spathe length. On well preserved specimens, the surfaces show parallel striations running from base to apex. Two sets of reproductive structures have been identified at the spathe apices-flowers and bulbils. The flowers are usually born in groups of two to six grouped in a helical arrangement near the spathe apex. Each bell shaped flower is born on a small pedicel typically between 2–8 mm (1/8–3/8 in) long. The bell is composed of three to four lobes and is 3–6 mm (1/8–1/4 in) wide by 4–8 mm (1/8–3/8 in) long. Careful preparation of several flowers did not find any fruits, seeds, pollen or anthers, suggesting the possibility the flowers were sterile. Some specimens have distinctly elongated pedicels and either small aborted flowers or buds. The bulbils are sessile around the apex of the scape, in confirmed groups of one to three. There is the possibility that higher numbers may have been borne, but if so, the Authors noted they may have been lost during specimen preparation or obscured under layers of matrix rock. The known bulbils range up to 1 mm × 0.2 mm (3/64 in × 1/64 in) in size.

Of the known specimens, the scapes are elongate and narrow, ranging between 18–40 mm (3/4–1 5/8 in) long by 0.8–1.2 mm (1/32–3/64 in) wide. All specimens have a torn scape base and none are attached to a bulb. They have longitudinal striations as is seen in some onion species and occasionally the apical area will have wisps of tissues around the spathe base, suggested to be outer "onion skin" layers.

== Paleoecology ==
Pigg et al postulated that production of both sexually reproductive flowers and asexually reproductive bulbils to have been a response to environmental factors in the Okanagan Highlands of the Ypresian. The region would have been subjected to volcanism, rapid geographic uplift and rapid ground or surface changes as a result of the activity. These events may have created fluctuating periods of low pollinator activity and high activity. The ability to alternate between sexual and asexual reproduction as conditions warranted would allow plants to take advantage of pollinator availability or conditions such as flood facilitated propagation.

== Paleoenvironment ==
Formations in the Okanagan Highlands represent upland lake systems which were surrounded by a warm temperate ecosystem with nearby volcanism dating from during and just after the early Eocene climatic optimum. The highlands likely had a mesic upper microthermal to lower mesothermal climate, in which winter temperatures rarely dropped low enough for snow, and which were seasonably equitable. The paleoforest surrounding the lakes have been described as precursors to the modern temperate broadleaf and mixed forests of Eastern North America and Eastern Asia. Based on the fossil biotas the lakes were higher and cooler then the coeval coastal forests preserved in the Puget Group and Chuckanut Formation of Western Washington, which are described as lowland tropical forest ecosystems. Estimates of the paleoelevation range between 0.7–1.2 km (0.43–0.75 mi) higher than the coastal forests. This is consistent with the paleoelevation estimates for the lake systems, which range between 1.1–2.9 km (1,100–2,900 m), which is similar to the modern elevation 0.8 km (0.50 mi), but higher.

Estimates of the mean annual temperature have been derived from climate leaf analysis multivariate program (CLAMP) analysis and leaf margin analysis (LMA) of both the Princeton and Republic paleofloras. The CLAMP results after multiple linear regressions for Republic gave a mean annual temperature of approximately 8.0 °C (46.4 °F), while the LMA gave 9.2 ± 2.0 °C (48.6 ± 3.6 °F). Princeton's multiple linear regression CLAMP results gave a slightly lower 5.1 °C (41.2 °F), and the LMA returned a mean annual temperature of 5.1 ± 2.2 °C (41.2 ± 4.0 °F). This is lower than the mean annual temperature estimates given for the coastal Puget Group, which is estimated to have been between 15–18.6 °C (59.0–65.5 °F). The bioclimatic analysis for Republic and Princeton suggest mean annual precipitation amounts of 115 ± 39 cm (45 ± 15 in) and 114 ± 42 cm (45 ± 17 in) respectively.
