= Copper Mountain, British Columbia =

Copper-mining company town in Canada

Coordinates: 49°20′00″N 120°31′32″W

Copper Mountain was an important copper-mining company town in the Similkameen Country of the Southern Interior of British Columbia, Canada, just south of the town of Princeton.

In 1884 copper ore was discovered by a trapper named James Jameson while out hunting deer. This discovery of copper led to a rush of miners to the area which gave rise to the town of Copper Mountain. The first camps located in the area was "Volcanic" Brown's Camp and E. Voight's Camp. These two camps merged to create the Granby Company's Copper Mountain operation. Copper Mountain mining operation lasted over half a century. The Copper Mountain mining operation was officially closed in 1958. The town of Copper Mountain was abandoned shortly after.

In 2011 mining was restarted by the Copper Mountain Mining Corporation, with open pit mining occurring in both the Copper Mountain pit and the nearby Ingerbelle pit, with projected reserves for a further 21 years of mining.

== Map ==
- "Copper Mountain map". geography.ua.edu. 1934.

== See also ==
- Allenby, British Columbia
- John Fall Allison
