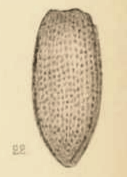
- 1890 illustration of fossil

Scientific classification
- Domain: Eukaryota
- Kingdom: Animalia
- Phylum: Arthropoda
- Class: Insecta
- Order: Coleoptera
- Suborder: Polyphaga
- Infraorder: Scarabaeiformia
- Family: Trogidae
- Subfamily: Troginae
- Genus: Trox
- Species: †T. oustaleti

Binomial name
- †Trox oustaleti Scudder, 1879

= Trox oustaleti =

Trox oustaleti Temporal range: Ypresian ~51 Ma

Species of beetle

Trox oustaleti is an extinct species of hide beetle in the subfamily Troginae described from a fossil found in the Ypresian age Allenby Formation of British Columbia, Canada. Within the genus Trox, it is placed in the core subgenus Trox.
