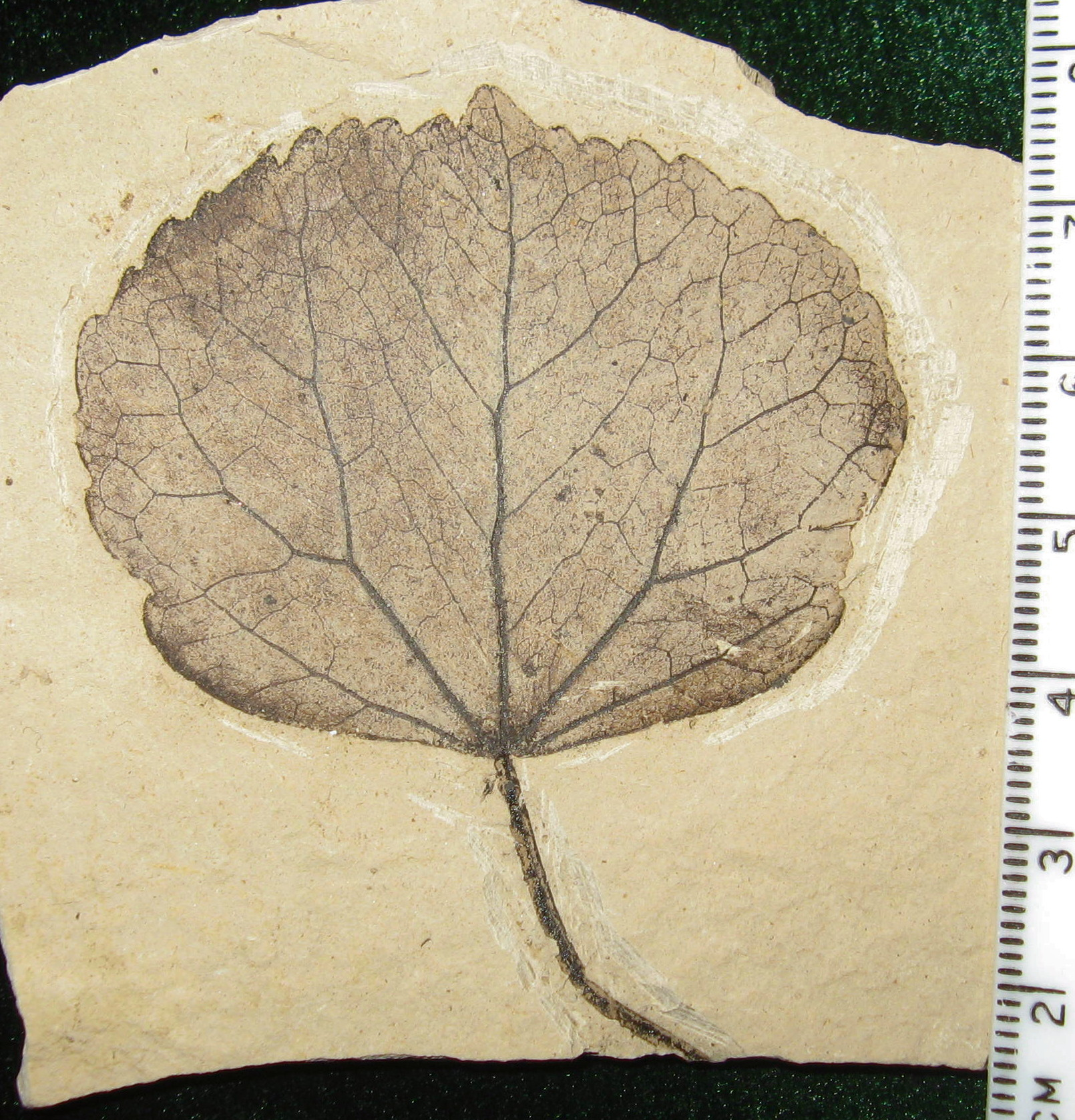

Scientific classification
- Kingdom: Plantae
- Clade: Tracheophytes
- Clade: Angiosperms
- Clade: Eudicots
- Order: Saxifragales
- Family: Cercidiphyllaceae
- Genus: Cercidiphyllum
- Species: †C. obtritum

Binomial name
- †Cercidiphyllum obtritum (Dawson) Wolfe & Wehr

Synonyms
- Joffrea obtritum; Populus obtritum

= Cercidiphyllum obtritum =

Cercidiphyllum obtritum Temporal range: Ypresian

Fossil species of flowering plant

Cercidiphyllum obtritum is an extinct species of katsura in the family Cercidiphyllaceae.
