= Princeton Group =

Geologic group in British Columbia

- Stratigraphic range: Paleogene
- Type: Group

Location
- Region: British Columbia
- Country: Canada

The Princeton Group is a geologic group in British Columbia. It preserves fossils dating back to the Paleogene period.

== See also ==
- List of fossiliferous stratigraphic units in British Columbia
