= Allenby, British Columbia =

Allenby
- Location of Allenby in British Columbia
- Coordinates: 49°25′00″N 120°31′00″W
- Country: Canada
- Province: British Columbia

Allenby was an important copper-mining company town in the Similkameen Country of the Southern Interior of British Columbia, Canada, ten miles south of the town of Princeton adjacent to the Similkameen River. The underground mine worked the seams at elevation in Copper Mountain on the east bank of the river. The mining camp was up on the mountain while the concentrator at Allenby was lower down near the river. It was for a short time the location of the Copper Mountain post office but that name was reinstated to its original site when the neighbouring Copper Mountain mining town, affiliated with the same mine (the Copper Mountain Mine of the Canadian Copper Company), was revived. The underground mine was in operation from 1917 to 1957 when a new open pit mine opened on the bench up on the west side of the river, confusingly it is also called Copper Mountain. The east bank site has been reworked with an open pit mine after the year 2000.

Allenby was named for Edmund Henry Hynman Allenby (1861-1936), British field marshal in Egypt and Palestine in World War I.

== See also ==
- Copper Mountain, British Columbia
- John Fall Allison
