= Eocene Okanagan Highlands =

Series of Early Eocene geological formations in Canada and the United States

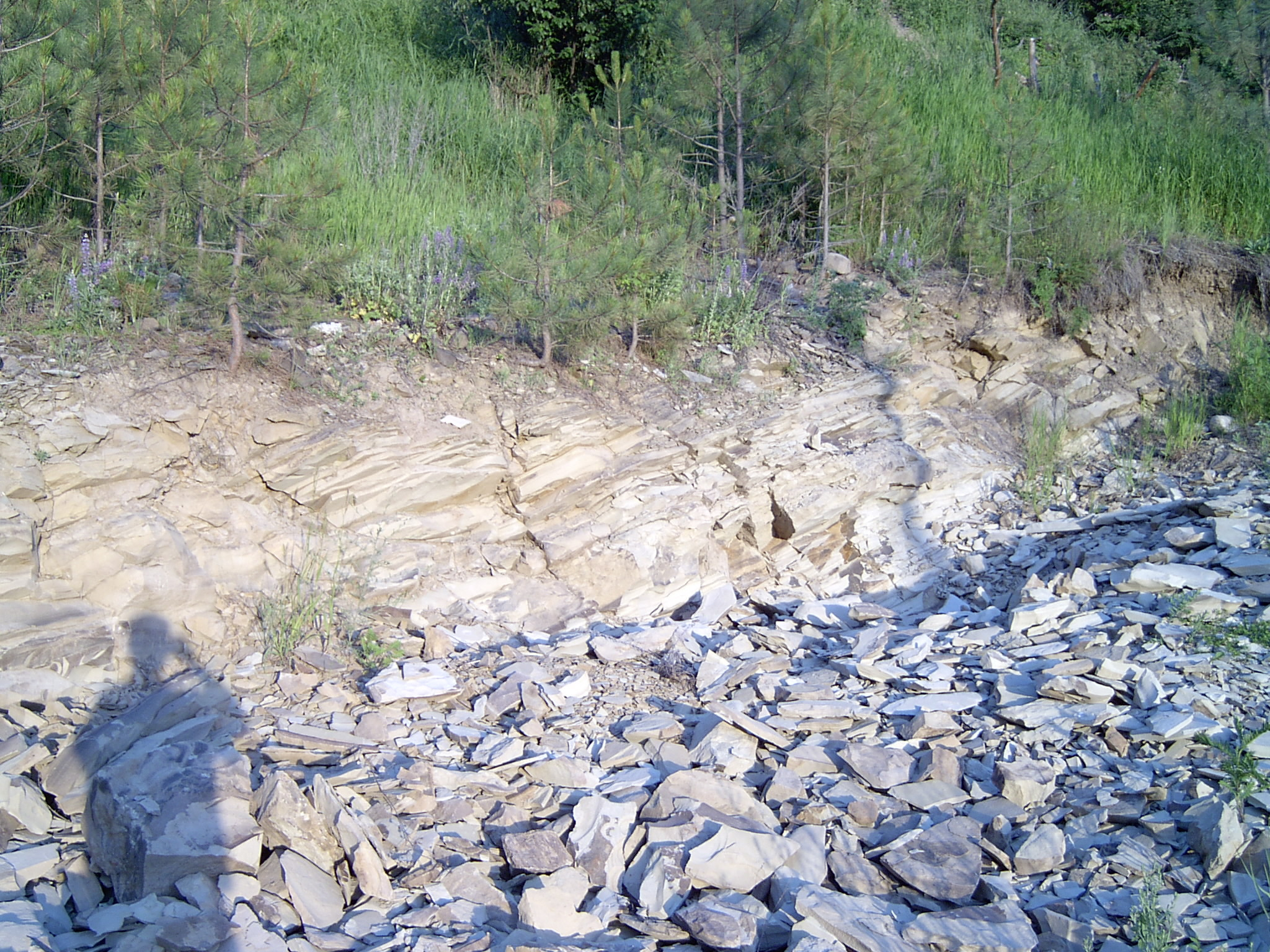
Outcrop of the Klondike Mountain Formation

The Eocene Okanagan Highlands or Eocene Okanogan Highlands are a series of Early Eocene geological formations which span a 1,000 km (620 mi) transect of British Columbia, Canada, and Washington state, United States. Known for a highly diverse and detailed plant and animal paleobiota the paleolake beds as a whole are considered one of the great Canadian Lagerstätten. The paleobiota represented are of an upland subtropical to temperate ecosystem series immediately after the Paleocene–Eocene thermal maximum, and before the increased cooling of the middle and late Eocene to Oligocene. The fossiliferous deposits of the region were noted as early as 1873, with small amounts of systematic work happening in the 1870–1920s on British Columbian sites, and 1920–1930s for Washington sites. Focus and more detailed descriptive work on the Okanagan Highland sites started in the late 1960s.

== Extent ==
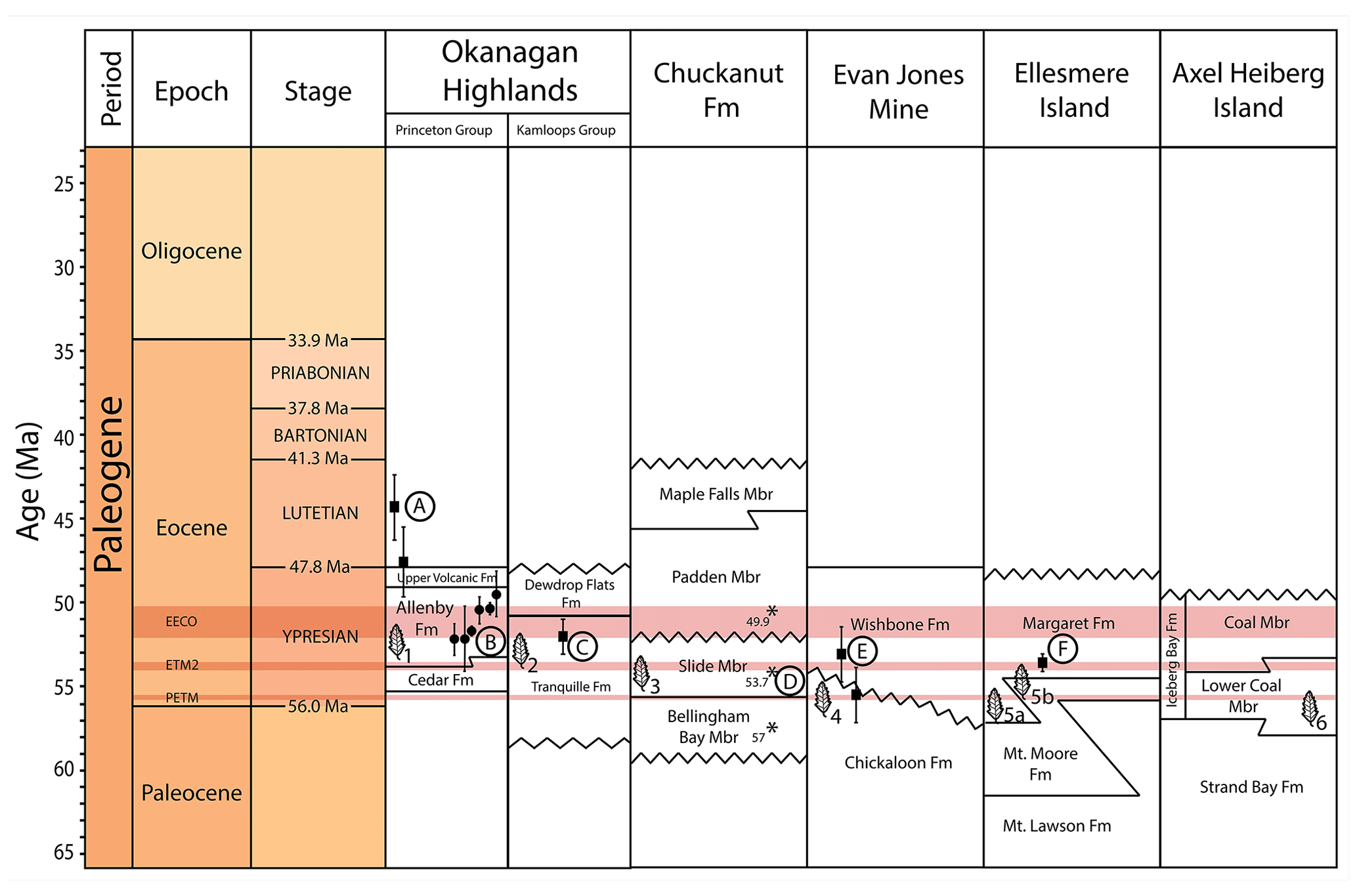
Temporal correlation to select North American Formations

The majority of the paleolake deposits are compression fossils in lake bed sediments spanning a 1,000 km (620 mi) transect, which have been grouped informally into "Northern", "Central", and "Southern" sites. The Northern sites are composed of unnamed Ootsa Group formations which outcrop as the "Driftwood shales" near Smithers, British Columbia, and the "Horsefly shales", of an unnamed formation and unnamed group which outcrop around Horsefly, British Columbia. The Central sites represent Kamloops Group formations with the McAbee Fossil Beds, Tranquille River site and Falkland site, all in the Tranquille Formation, the Quichena site and Stump Lake site in the Coldwater Beds and outcrops of the Chu Chua and Skull Hill Formations near Barriere, British Columbia. The Southern sites include the Princeton Group Allenby Formation sites surrounding Princeton, British Columbia, such as "Nine Mile Creek", "One Mile Creek", "Pleasant Valley", "Thomas Ranch", "Vermilian Bluffs", and "Whipsaw Creek". The most southerly of the Okanagan Highlands lakes, the Klondike Mountain Formation in Northern Ferry County, Washington, include the "Boot Hill site", "Corner Lot site", "Gold Mountain site", "Knob Hill site", and "Mount Elizabeth site". Closely correlated with the Klondike Mountain Formation are the Penticton groups Kettle River, Marama and Marron Formations in the Boundary District along the Canada–United States border.

There is debate as to the affiliation of the, now lost, Quesnel sites with the Greater Okanagan Highlands. Archibald et al (2018) in the monograph overview of the Highlands Hymenoptera included them as part of the series. However the certainty for the placement was later questioned by Archibald and Cannings (2022) who opted to tentatively exclude Quesnel from the highlands while discussing the history of field collecting in the region.

== History ==
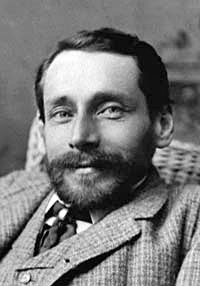
George Mercer Dawson in 1885

The earliest geological work in south and central British Columbian sites was during exploratory expeditions under the leadership of George Mercer Dawson in the mid-1870s to document the coal and mineral resources of British Columbia. During the 1875 field work, fossil collections were made in the Quesnel region. Two years later, in 1877, the expedition explored the Okanagan, Nicola, and North Thompson valleys with field collecting along areas of the Similkameen River, Whipsaw Creek and Nine-Mile Creek, north at around Quilchena, and at several areas near Kamloops. These expeditions resulted in a series of papers on the plants, authored by John William Dawson, later David Pearce Penhallow and Edward Wilber Berry. The insects were first detailed by Samuel Hubbard Scudder, with follow-up papers by Anton Handlirsch. While reporting on additional plant fossils collected from British Columbia, Penhallow (1906) noted the likely coeval status of the Princeton basins with many of the sites now considered the Okanagan Highlands. The first brief work on fish from the Highlands occurred with the 1893 report by Edward Drinker Cope on several fish sent to him by George Dawson from the Tranquille and Princeton areas. While Cope deemed the Tranquille specimens too incomplete to identify, he did provide the description for "Amyzon" brevipinne from the Similkameen River fossils.

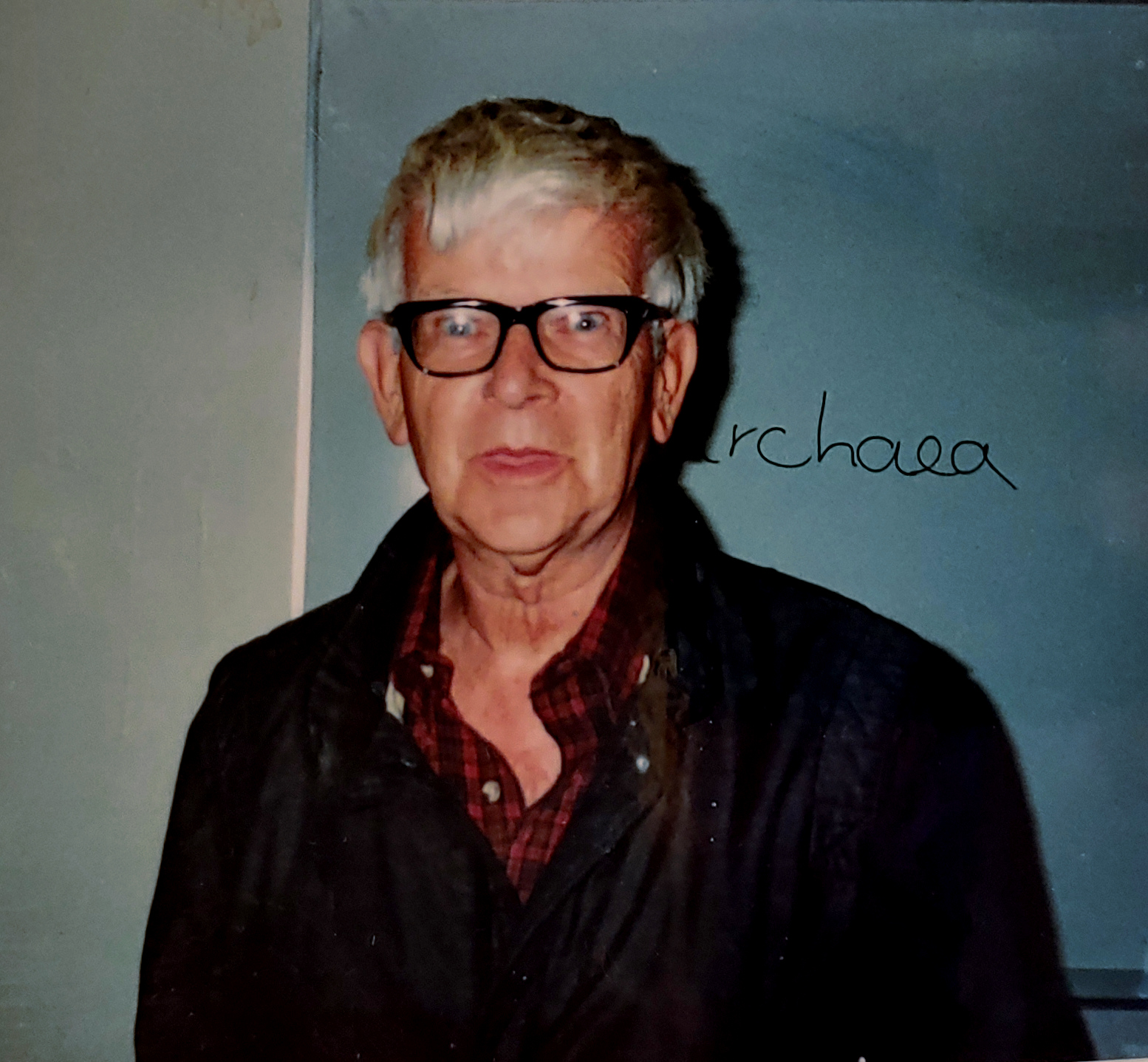
Wesley Wehr in 1998

Republic, Washington, area fossils were first reported by Joseph Umpleby (1910), based on fish he collected near the Tom Thumb mine, and given a tentative late Miocene age. Two of the fish were figured and briefly mentioned 7 years later by Charles R. Eastman, who assigned them tentatively to "Amyzon" brevipinne, making one of the early connections between Republic and the British Columbian sites. Report of the plant fossils of the Republic area were first published by Berry (1929) who included the Republic fossils as part of the Latah Formation. The inclusion within an expanded Latah Formation was questioned by Roland W. Brown in 1936, who noted the similarities between Republic and other older fossil sites, combined with the Republic lake bed's overlying basalts then thought to be of similar age to the Columbia River Basalts. This similarity was again noted by Chester A. Arnold during his review of the conifer flora associated with the Princeton basin. Arnold noted the Allenby sites shared over half of the taxa that had been previously reported from Republic.

Starting in the early 1960s and extending through the 1980s were a series of papers on the British Columbian sites combining palynology and the newly devised process of potassium–argon dating to better understand the geochronology of the sites. The first report of K–Ar dating at a group of sites was by Glenn E. Rouse and William H. Mathews (1961) who tested biotite samples from four locations. They sampled volcanic ashes from Princeton and Rock Creek; a Trachyte flow from Savona Mountain and a diabase flow or sill from Tranquille, returning results of 49 to 45 million years ago, then classified as Early Middle Eocene. They noted the very distinct similarities with the Republic flora, as Arnold had, and posited that the Republic fossils were of the same age, and not Oligocene as then considered. Based on the estimated age, the sites were noted to be coeval with the Green River Formation but that the floras of the two regions were drastically different, and that more study was needed.

The term "Okanagan Highlands" for Eocene formations of the region was coined by Wesley Wehr and Howard Schorn in a 1992 Washington Geology paper on the conifer research at Republic. The name was derived from the current Okanagan Highlands but applied to the, as then identified, microthermal forests preserved at Republic and Princeton. The term was expanded upon, and by 2005 it was generally understood to encompass all Eocene fossiliferous formations between Republic and Smithers, British Columbia. The highlands as a whole have been described as one of the "Great Canadian Lagerstätten" based on the diversity, quality and unique nature of the biotas that are preserved. The highlands temperate biome, preserved across a large transect of lakes, recorded many of the earliest appearances of modern genera, while also documenting the last stands of ancient lines.

== Preservation types ==
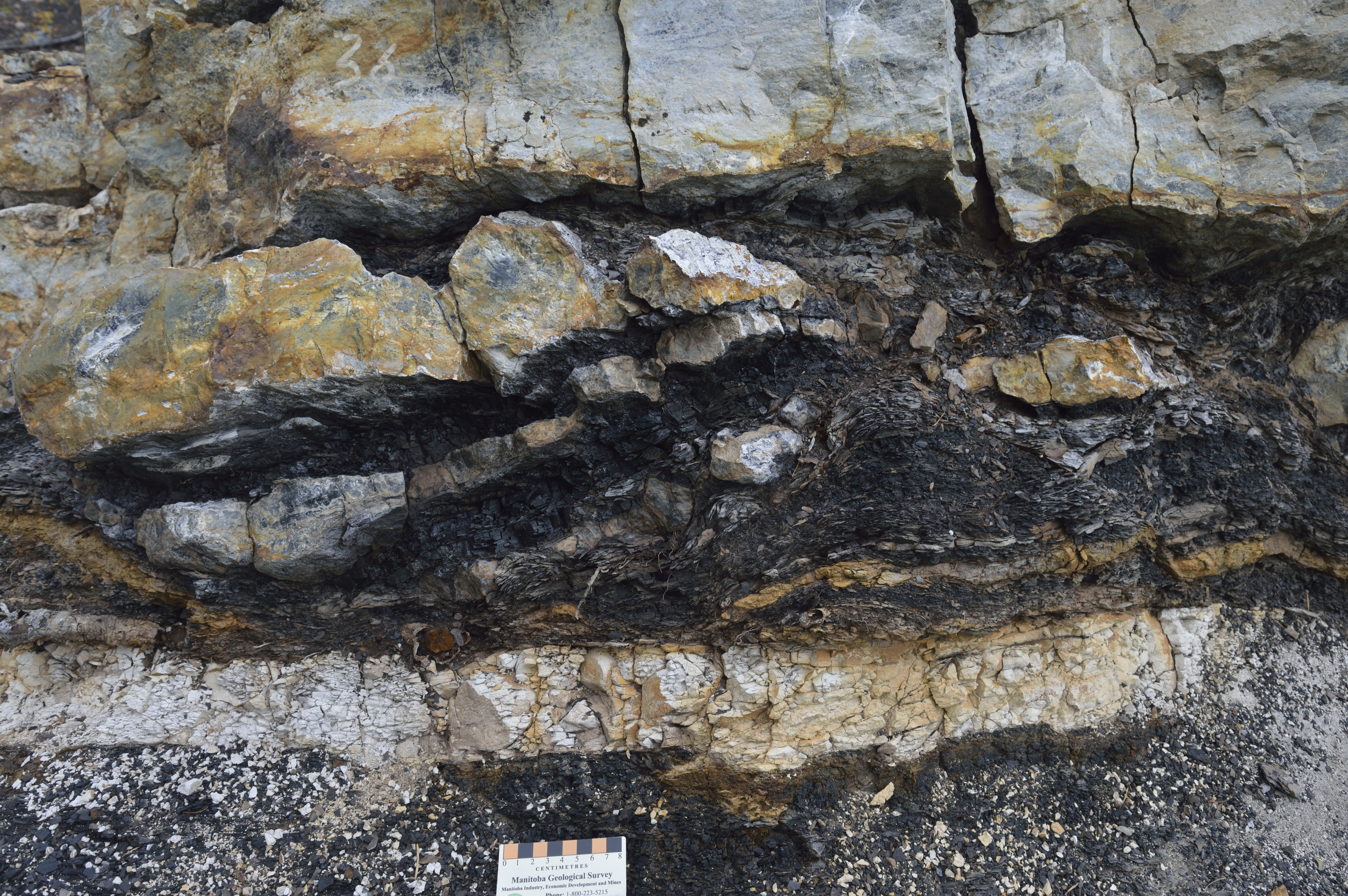
Princeton Chert and "Ashnola shale" interbeds

The majority of formations in the Eocene Okanagan Highlands preserve compression fossils in sandstone to shale rock deposited from lake environments where seasonal mixing and anoxia were prevalent. Additionally, two important non-compression biotas are present in the Eocene Okanagan Highlands: A permineralized chert flora, the Princeton Chert is found along the Similkameen River interbedded with coal deposits of the Ashnola shale unit, Allenby Formation, known for anatomically preserved plants. In the Central sites, subbituminous coal of the Hat Creek Coal Formation around Hat Creek hosts an amber fauna, the Hat Creek amber which preserves many small insects that would likely not be found in the compression biotas.

== Paleoclimate ==
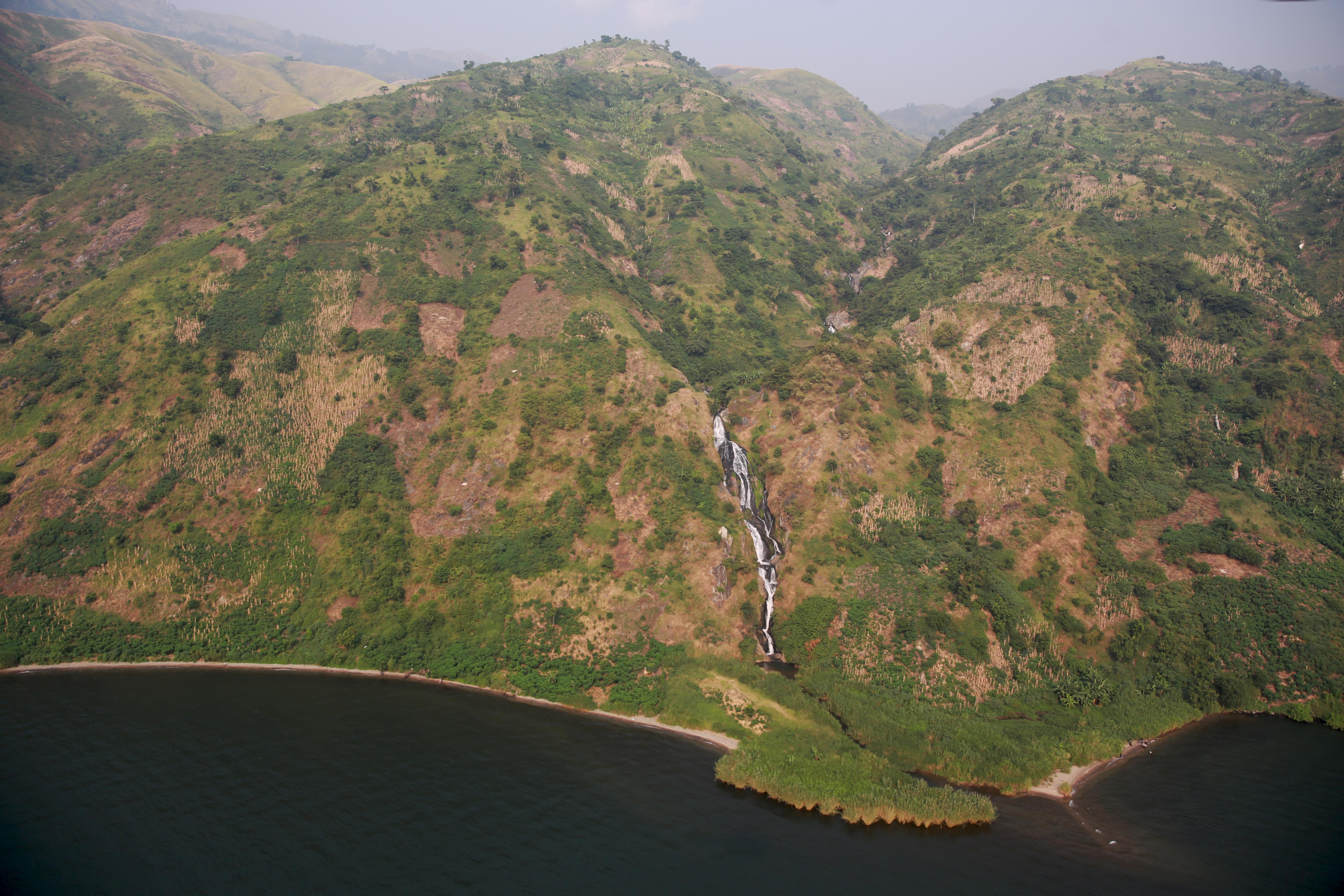
Virunga Mountains over Lake Edward

Based on paleobotanical proxies and geochemical data, the highlands are thought to have been between 500–1,500 m (1,600–4,900 ft) in elevation, placing them similar to or higher than the modern sites. Estimates of the mean annual temperature have been derived from climate leaf analysis multivariate program (CLAMP) analysis and leaf margin analysis (LMA) of both the Princeton and Republic paleofloras. The CLAMP results, after multiple linear regressions for Republic, gave a mean annual temperature of approximately 8.0 °C (46.4 °F), while the LMA gave 9.2 ± 2.0 °C (48.6 ± 3.6 °F). Princeton's multiple linear regression CLAMP results gave a slightly lower 5.1 °C (41.2 °F), and the LMA returned a mean annual temperature of 5.1 ± 2.2 °C (41.2 ± 4.0 °F). This is lower than the mean annual temperature estimates given for the coastal Puget Group, which is estimated to have been between 15–18.6 °C (59.0–65.5 °F). The bioclimatic analysis for Republic and Princeton suggest mean annual precipitation amounts of 115 ± 39 cm (45 ± 15 in) and 114 ± 42 cm (45 ± 17 in) respectively.

The warm temperate uplands floras of the highlands, associated with downfaulted lacustrine basins and active volcanism are noted to have no exact modern equivalents, due to the more seasonally equitable conditions of the Early Eocene. However, the highlands have been compared to the upland ecological islands in the Virunga Mountains within the Albertine Rift of the African rift valley.

== Paleobiota ==
The Eocene Okanagan Highlands hosted a diverse mix of temperate and tropical paleobiotic elements, with the forests having the first significant proportions of temperate plants in North America.

The paleobotanical community was a mixture of plants found in subtropical evergreen and temperate deciduous forests. Included in the forest were a number of important modern temperate flowering plant families such as Betulaceae, Rosaceae, and Sapindaceae, plus the conifer family Pinaceae. Study of the deciduous plants from the highlands has documented the occurrence of heteromorphic leaves derived from sun versus shade conditions and long shoot or short shoot buds. The paleobotanical community of the Republic area has been noted as the most diverse floral community of the Okanagan Highlands, with some estimates ranging to over 68 families and 134 genera being present.
