= Whipsaw Creek =

Creek in the Similkameen region of British Columbia, Canada

Coordinates: 49°22′N 120°33′W

Whipsaw Creek is a creek in the Similkameen region of British Columbia. The creek flows into the Similkameen River from the west and is approximately 6 miles (9.7 km) upriver from Princeton, British Columbia. The Crowsnest Highway, Highway 3, makes a dangerous hair pin bend around the creek banks to avoid the defile. Whipsaw Creek has been mined for gold.
