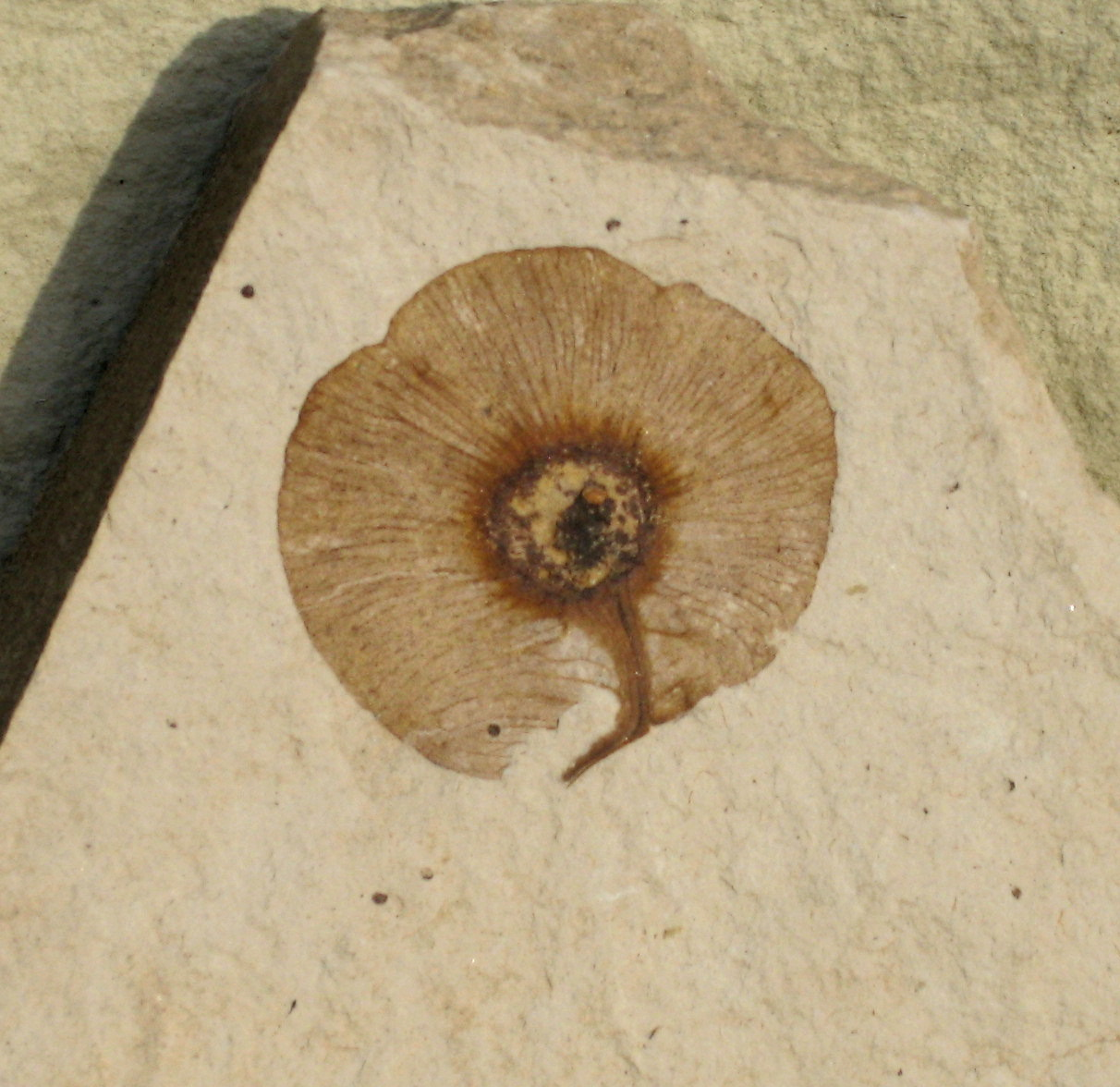
- Dipteronia brownii mericarp Klondike Mountain Formation

Scientific classification
- Kingdom: Plantae
- Clade: Tracheophytes
- Clade: Angiosperms
- Clade: Eudicots
- Clade: Rosids
- Order: Sapindales
- Family: Sapindaceae
- Genus: Dipteronia
- Species: D. brownii

Binomial name
- Dipteronia brownii McClain & Manchester, 2001

= Dipteronia brownii =

Dipteronia brownii Temporal range: Paleocene – Oligocene

Genus of flowering plants

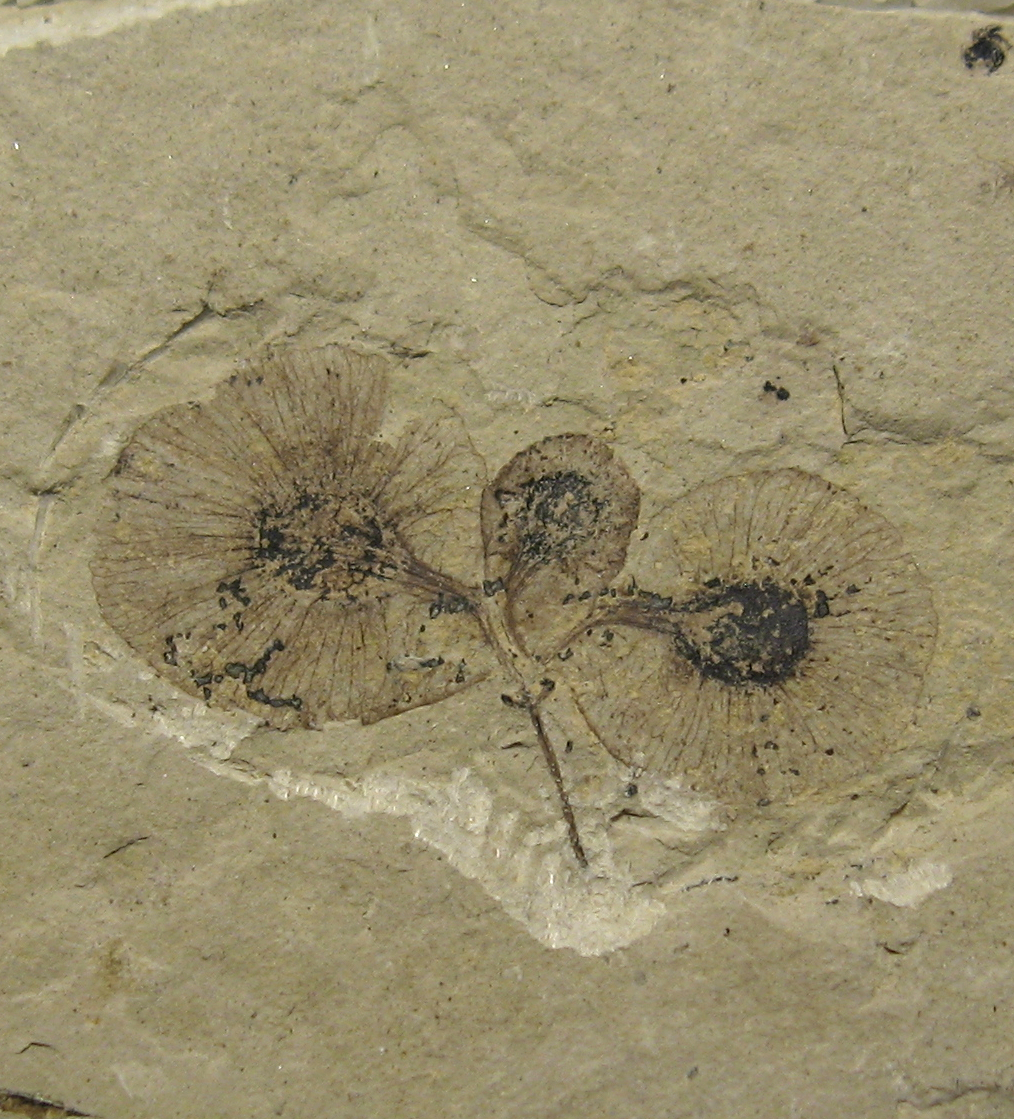
D. brownii schizocarp. Klondike Mountain Formation

Dipteronia brownii is an extinct species in the soapberry family (Sapindaceae) described in 2001. Fossils of D. brownii are known from stratigraphic formations in North America and Asia ranging in age between Paleocene to Early Oligocene.

== Distribution and paleoecology ==
The oldest occurrences for Dipteronia brownii are both Paleogene in age, with fossils found in the Middle Paleocene, 63 to 60 million years ago Fort Union Formation of Wyoming and the Danian Middle-Upper Tsagayan Formation of Northeastern coastal Russia. Migration between the slightly older Russian Far East site and North America was likely facilitated by the Beringian land bridge during the early to middle Paleoene.

In the Early Eocene the species expanded into the Eocene Okanagan Highlands sites of East central British Columbia and north east central Washington. Fossils have been found in the Okanagan highlands formations from the southern most Klondike Mountain Formation to the northern most Driftwood Shales, with occurrences in the Allenby Formation, Tranquille Formation, Chu Chua Formation and Horsefly Shales.

During the Middle Eocene the species appears in the John Day Formation of central Oregon. During the middle to late Eocene the species spread east and south to the Ruby Basin Flora of Montana and the Florissant Formation of Colorado, while the last North American occurrence is in the Early Oligocene, Rupelian of upper John Day Formations Bridge Creek Flora. Concurrently, Dipteronia brownii fruits are also found in Rupelian 32 ± 1 million years ago lacustrine mudstones of Chuxiong Yi Autonomous Prefecture southwestern China, and are also the southern most of the D. brownii fossils.

Ding et al. (2018) posited that the reduction of Dipteronia from the broad North American and wide Asian range seen in D. brownii to the isolated regional endemic of modern times seen in Dipteronia dyeriana and Dipteronia sinensis was the result of several factors. Range reduction was likely due to overall global cooling during the Oligocene and Miocene, combined with increased and intensified rain fall in the northern hemisphere and associated high latitude drying.

== History and classification ==
Roland Brown (1935) described the Dipteronia species Dipteronia americana based on both fruits and leaflets including one pair of leaflets first figured by Edward Berry (1929). The species was redescribed by Jack Wolfe and Wesley Wehr (1987) who designated the leaflet as lectotype for the species, which they moved to the new extinct genus Bohlenia based on the difference in leaflet venation from that of other sapindalian taxa.

Manchester (1999) figured a single Dipteronia mericarp fossil which was at that time identified as being from the Eocene Fushun Formation in Liaoning Province, China. The location was taken from the specimen drawer in the University of California Museum of Paleontology collections where the fossil was stored; however, the fossil itself did not have a label indicating its location. Doubt was later raised regarding the provenance of the fossil, with Manchester being informed that the UCMP formerly housed collections of very similarly colored shale from the Chu Chua Formation near Joseph Creek, British Columbia. The Chu Chua fossils had been transferred to the Geological Survey of Canada collections in the 1970's, but it was possible the Dipteronia specimen was left behind. Palynological analysis of pollen in the specimen matrix was performed in October 2000 in conjunction with the Manchester (2001) research as an attempt to determine the origin site. Based on pollen analysis of Fushun shale, Chu Chua shale and the specimen, much of the palynofloras overlapped. However the palynomorphs Liquidambarpollenites and Ephedripites were only seen in Fushun samples and not the Chu Chua or the mystery sample. Additionally though no other Dipteronia have been identified in Joseph Creek collections, the genus is present at coeval locations elsewhere in the Eocene Okanagan Highlands, leading Manchester (2001) to place the fossil as Joseph Creek, and state Dipteronia was not present in the Fushun Flora.

The North American Dipteronia fossils were reexamined and redescribed by Amy McClain and Steven Manchester, whose 2001 type description for Dipteronia brownii was published in the American Journal of Botany. McClain and Manchester noted the lack of attachment fossils uniting the Bohlenia americana leaflets to fruits, and as such opted to remove the fruits from Bohlenia and restrict the taxon definition to only foliage. They opted to name the new fruit species D. brownii as a patronym honoring Roland Brown as the first systematist to recognize Dipteronia fossils.

== Description ==
Dipteronia brownii fruits were born in schizocarp consisting of three, and less commonly two, flat mericarps which attach along a straight proximal edge. The schizocarps were born on long thin pedicels which flared to a disk-shaped juncture with the perianth. The mericarps have a circular smooth outline, extending from the proximal attachment scar, giving a subelliptical profile to the 8–24 mm (0.3–0.9 in) wing. A single primary vein runs 1.6–5.6 mm (0.1–0.2 in) from the pedicel up the attachment scar before turning inward at a 90–135° angle towards the center of the wing. In the central area of the wing, 2–8 mm (0.1–0.3 in) from the wing edge, is a pyriform to elliptical seed with a diameter of 3–8 mm (0.1–0.3 in). Covering the surface of the seed pericarp is a reticulated network of secondary veins. The tertiary veins spreading out from the seed though the wing split and join as they extend to the wing margin. connecting the tertiaries is a fine reticulum of quaternary veins which form polygonal areoles.
