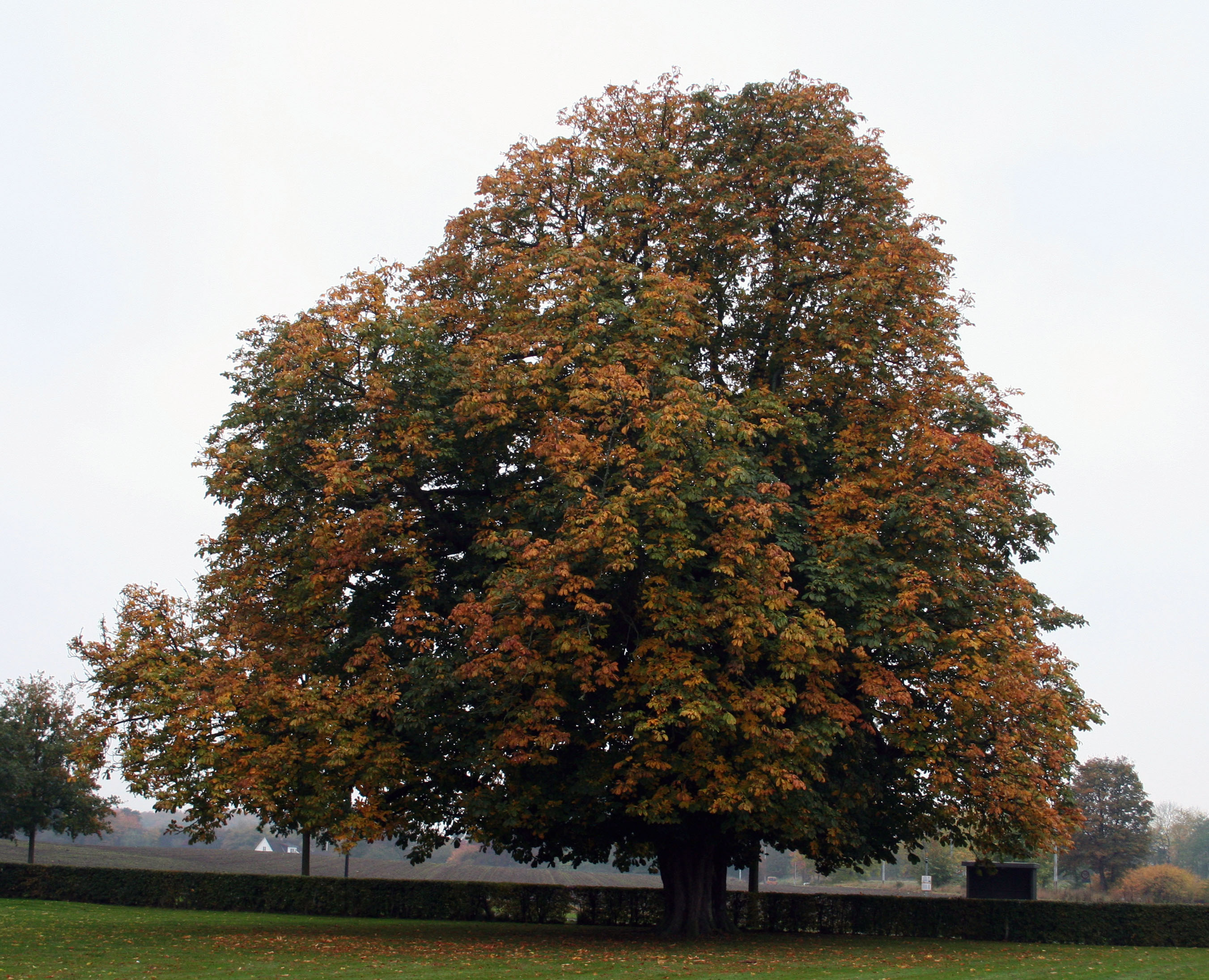
- Aesculus hippocastanum

Scientific classification
- Kingdom: Plantae
- Clade: Embryophytes
- Clade: Tracheophytes
- Clade: Spermatophytes
- Clade: Angiosperms
- Clade: Eudicots
- Clade: Rosids
- Order: Sapindales
- Family: Sapindaceae
- Subfamily: Hippocastanoideae; Dumortier

Tribes and Genera
- Acereae; Acer; Dipteronia; Hippocastaneae; Aesculus; Billia; Handeliodendron

= Hippocastanoideae =

Subfamily of flowering plants

Hippocastanoideae is a subfamily of flowering plants in the soapberry family Sapindaceae. The two tribes in the group (Acereae and Hippocastaneae) were formerly treated as the separate families Aceraceae and Hippocastanaceae. Molecular phylogenetic research by Harrington et al. (2005) has shown that while both the Aceraceae and Hippocastanaceae are monophyletic in themselves, their removal from the Sapindaceae sensu lato would leave Sapindaceae sensu stricto as a paraphyletic group, particularly with reference to the genus Xanthoceras.

The most widespread genera are Acer (the maples) and Aesculus (the horse chestnuts and buckeyes). A feature of the subfamily is the palmate compound leaves.

== Genera ==
| Genus | Authority | Common name | Number of Living Species | Image |
|---|---|---|---|---|
| Acer | Linnaeus | Maples | 160 | Acer palmatum |
| Aesculus | Linnaeus | Horse-chestnuts & buckeyes | 13-19 | Aesculus parviflora |
| Billia | Peyeitsch | | 2 | Billia colombiana |
| Dipteronia | Oliver | | 2 | Dipteronia sinensis |
| Handeliodendron | Rehder | | 1 | |
