= Handeliodendron =

Scientific classification
- Kingdom: Plantae
- Clade: Tracheophytes
- Clade: Angiosperms
- Clade: Eudicots
- Clade: Rosids
- Order: Sapindales
- Family: Sapindaceae
- Subfamily: Hippocastanoideae
- Genus: Handeliodendron; Rehder
- Species: H. bodinieri

Binomial name
- Handeliodendron bodinieri (H. Léveillé) Rehder

Genus of flowering plants

Handeliodendron bodinieri is a rare deciduous tree/shrub native to China and the only species in the monotypic genus Handeliodendron.

== Description ==
It grows up to 15 meters tall, and grows in mountain areas characterized by irregular limestone formations in Guangxi and Guizhou. The seeds are rich in oil, making them attractive to wild animals.

== Classification ==
It is related to Aesculus (horse chestnuts) and Billia, and is classified with in either Sapindaceae, subfamily Hippocastanoideae, or the family Hippocastanaceae.
