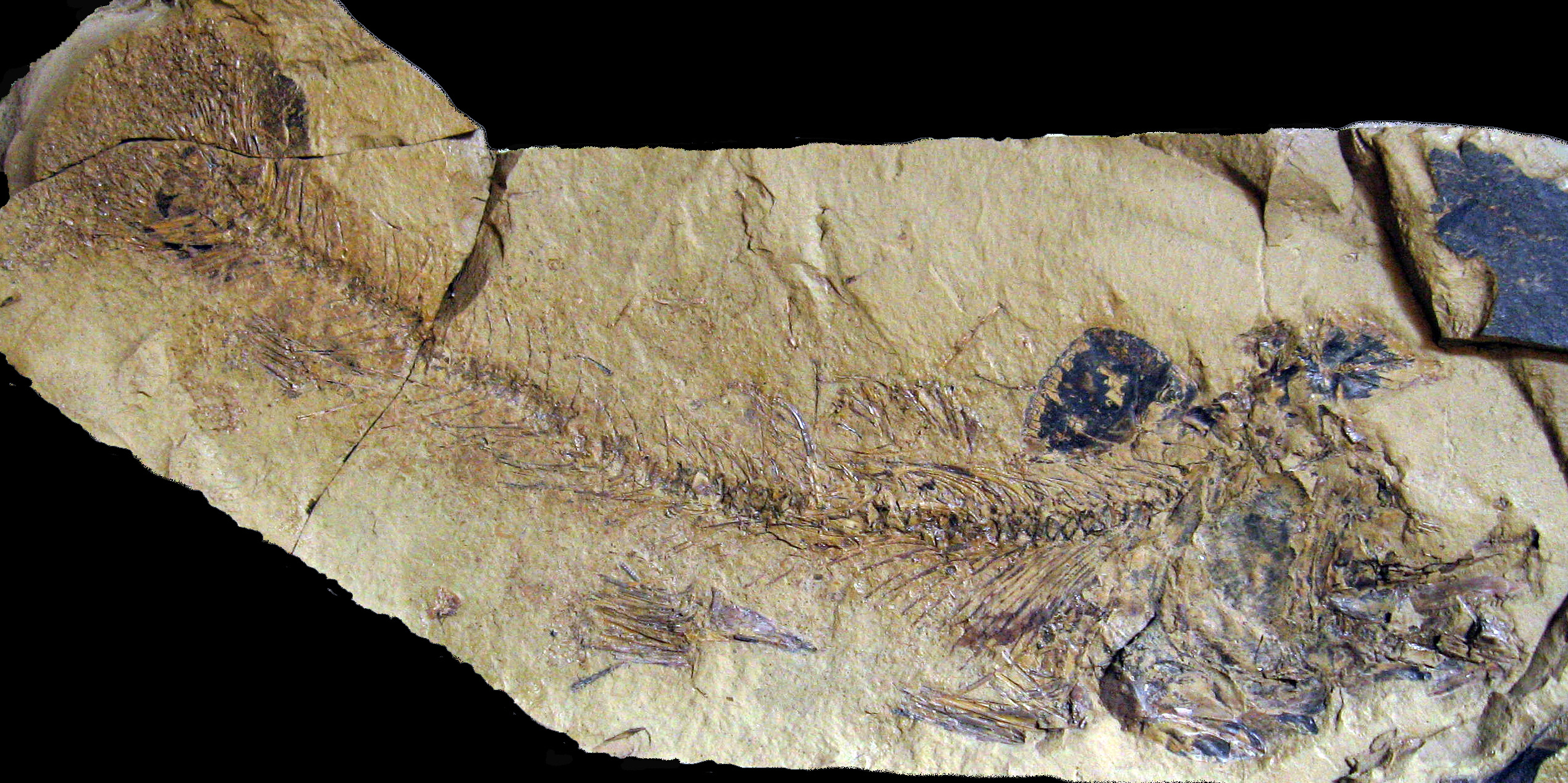
- Specimen of E. driftwoodensis, Stonerose Interpretive Center

Scientific classification
- Kingdom: Animalia
- Phylum: Chordata
- Class: Actinopterygii
- Division: Teleostei
- Order: Salmoniformes
- Family: Salmonidae
- Subfamily: Salmoninae
- Genus: †Eosalmo; Wilson, 1977
- Species: †E. driftwoodensis

Binomial name
- †Eosalmo driftwoodensis Wilson, 1977

= Eosalmo =

Eosalmo Temporal range: Early Eocene, Ypresian

Extinct genus of fishes

Eosalmo is an extinct genus of ancient freshwater salmonid with a single described species Eosalmo driftwoodensis. The genus lived during the Eocene epoch and has been recovered from late Ypresian fossils in the Eocene Okanagan Highlands of the northwestern United States and western Canada. Additional fossils briefly mentioned as Eosalmo were reported from Russia, but they have not received close taxonomic treatment since. E. driftwoodensis is used as a phylogenetic calibration point for studies of the relationships in Salmonidae and Salmoniformes. Based on preservation of juvenile to adult specimens at some of the sites, the species lived its full lifecycle in freshwater, with no travel from the highlands to the sea as in modern salmon.

== Distribution ==
Eosalmo driftwoodensis fossils have been recovered from locations in the Okanagan Highlands. Articulated skeletons are known from the type locality Driftwood Shales in Driftwood Canyon Provincial Park, near Smithers, British Columbia, the Allenby Formation surrounding Princeton, British Columbia, Canada and the southernmost highlands sites in the Klondike Mountain Formation surrounding Republic, Ferry County, Washington. Isolated skeletal elements reported from the Tranquille Formation at McAbee. Bone and scale material recovered from coprolites or regurgitalites at the Quilchena site in the Coldwater Beds has been identified as Eosalmo cf. driftwoodensis due to its fragmentary and partially digested nature.

Early estimates of the highlands sites ranged from Miocene to Eocene in age. The age of the Allenby Formation was debated for many years, with fish and insect fossils hinting at an Eocene age, while mammal and plant fossils suggested a Late Oligocene or Early Miocene age. The lake sediments at Princeton were radiometrically dated using the K-Ar method in the 1960s based on ash samples exposed in the lake bed. These samples yielded an age of ~48 million years ago; however, dating published in 2005 provided a ^{40}Ar-^{39}Ar radiometric date placing some Princeton sites at 52.08 ± 0.12 million years ago. A report using dating of detrital zircon crystals from several of the southern highlands lake beds consistently reaffirmed ages in the Late Ypresian, with dates oldest likely ages between 53 to 51.2 million years ago. Tuffs of the Klondike Mountain Formation had been dated to 49.42 ± 0.54 million years ago, the youngest of the Okanagan Highlands sites, though a revised oldest age of 51.2 ± 0.1 million years ago was given based on isotopic data published in 2021. The same 2005 dating paper established the shales at Driftwood, which had not been formally described, as dating to around 51 million years ago in accordance with the other sites of the highlands.

The genus has also been tentatively identified from a fossil recovered in Western Kamchatka (E.K. Sychevskaya 1986). Little has been published on the fossil, outside a suggestion by M.K. Glubokovsky that the Kamchatkan material was closer to Parasalmo, now placed as a species in Oncorhynchus.

== History and classification ==
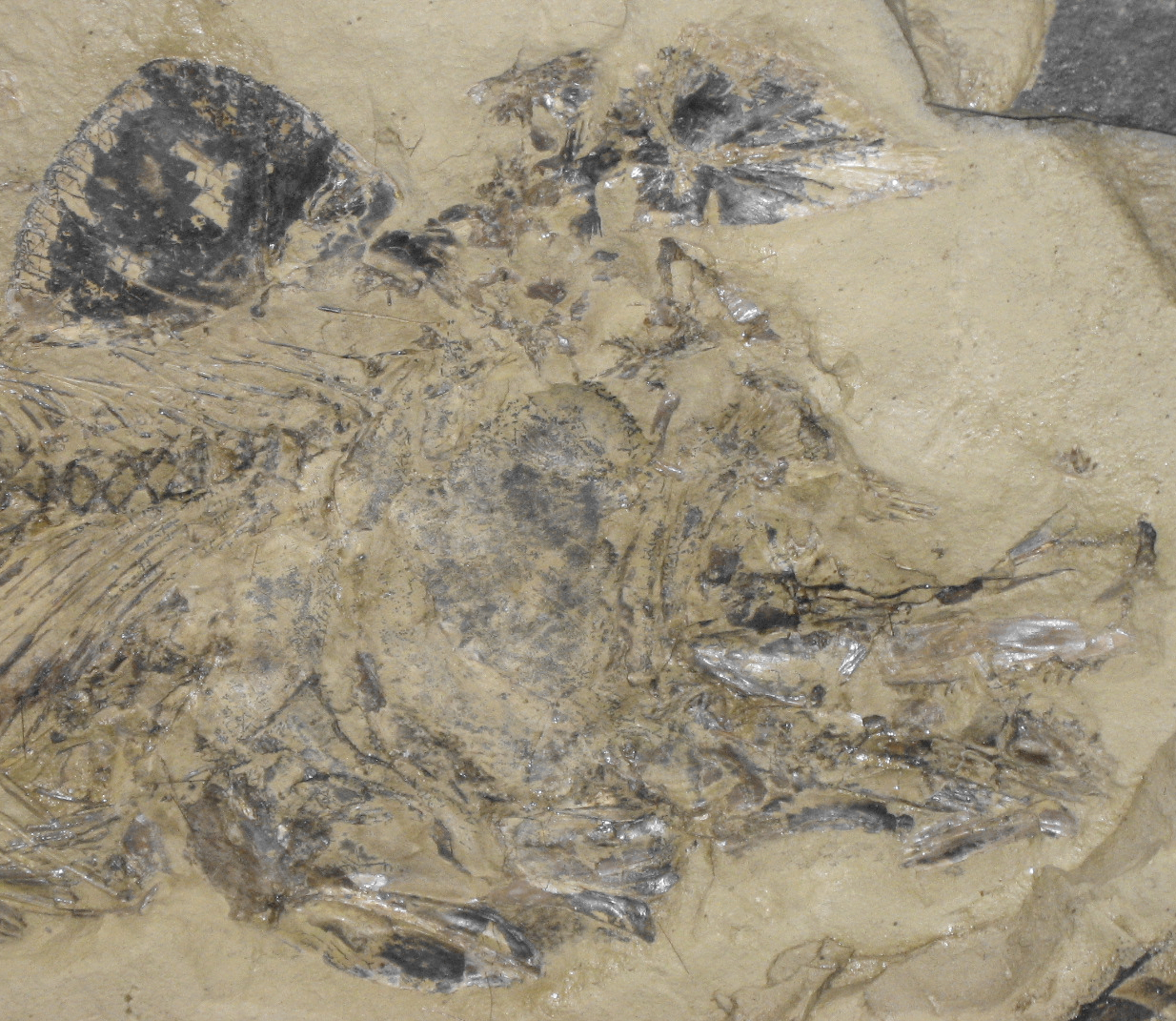
head of a Republic Eosalmo

Based on a series of partial skeletons collected by himself and already present in museum collections, the genus and species were first described by paleoichthyologist Mark V. H. Wilson in his 1977 monograph. The holotype, Royal Ontario Museum specimen ROM 11178 A&B, is a nearly complete part & counter part skeleton collected in 1971 from Driftwoood Canyon. Wilson also designated a series of specimens as topotypes as well, ROM 11172 - 11176, all partial skeletons collected by Wilson in 1970 and 1971. University of Alberta specimens UA 12326 and 12327 are also partial fossils. The oldest type series fossil is an isolated tail and tail fin collected by E. J. Lees in 1936 and preserved as Canadian Museum of Nature specimen NMC 21100. In addition to the fossils of Driftwood creek, Wilson also described in brief detail two very partial Canadian Museum fossils, NMC J-43-J-45 and NMC 4571 which had been collected from Allenby Formation outcrops in the Pleasant Valley area near Princeton. Due to the incomplete nature of the fossil material, Wilson only identified those fossils as Eosalmo cf. driftwoodensis.

A new but tentative occurrence for Eosalmo cf. driftwoodensis was reported by Wilson in 1987. Fossils of isolated scales and a preopercle were identified from Quilchena while collecting at the site for study of predation on the fish fauna there. Mark Wilson again expanded the known occurrences again in 1996, confirming fossils found at Republic, Washington as E. driftwoodensis in a Washington Geology informal article which also included a photo of the largest and most complete known specimen, on display in the Miguasha Natural History Museum. Wilson also contributed to the 1996 book Life in Stone with the chapter Fishes from Eocene lakes of the Interior, where he reaffirmed the Republic occurrence and speculated on the life cycle of the species. In 1999 Wilson and Guo-Qing Li published a redescription and phylogenetic assessment of Eosalmo based on an expanded dataset of fossils from Driftwood, Princeton, and Republic. The fossils or casts of fossils included were from the not only the University of Alberta and Royal Ontario Museum, but also a group of five specimens from the Field Museum of Natural History and three from the Burke Museum of Natural History. Wilson and Li acknowledged the inclusion of the Kamchatka fossil referred to Eosalmo, but they considered the specimen as being too incomplete to include in their review data,

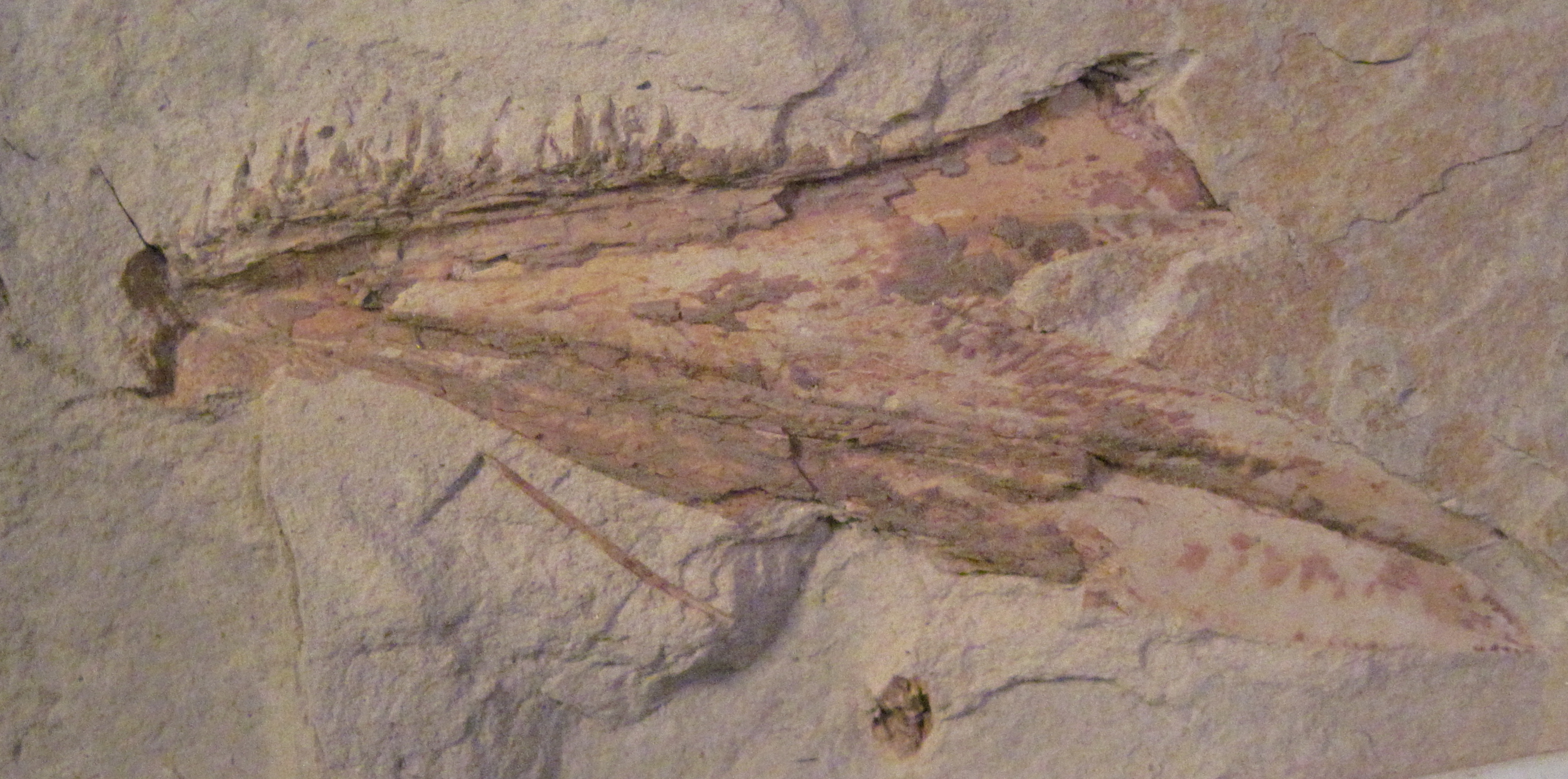
Isolated maxilla 3.5 cm (1.4 in) long

When first described, Wilson suggested the genus was an intermediate in form to the extant salmonid subfamilies Salmoninae (trout and salmon) and Thymallinae (graylings). Subsequent reviews of the family have moved Eosalmo to be the most primitive member of the Salmoninae subfamily, with both Thymallinae and Coregoninae (freshwater whitefish) branching off before Eosalmo. The position as the oldest Salmonine make it a "key freshwater stem-salmonin" for investigation of Salmon family migratory habits and distributions. A genetics team led by M. A. Alexandrou (2013) reconfirmed the placement of Eosalmo as the basal most Salmoninae genus, but found the genus and subfamily to be closer to Coregoninae and not to Thymallinae, opposite of the older studies topographies.

Until the description of the even older Sivulliusalmo in 2025, Eosalmo was the oldest salmonid taxon described. Given its status as the most recent common ancestor, E. driftwoodensis is used as a calibration node or a constraint for phylogenetic analysis of Salmoniform taxa at varying levels.

== Description ==
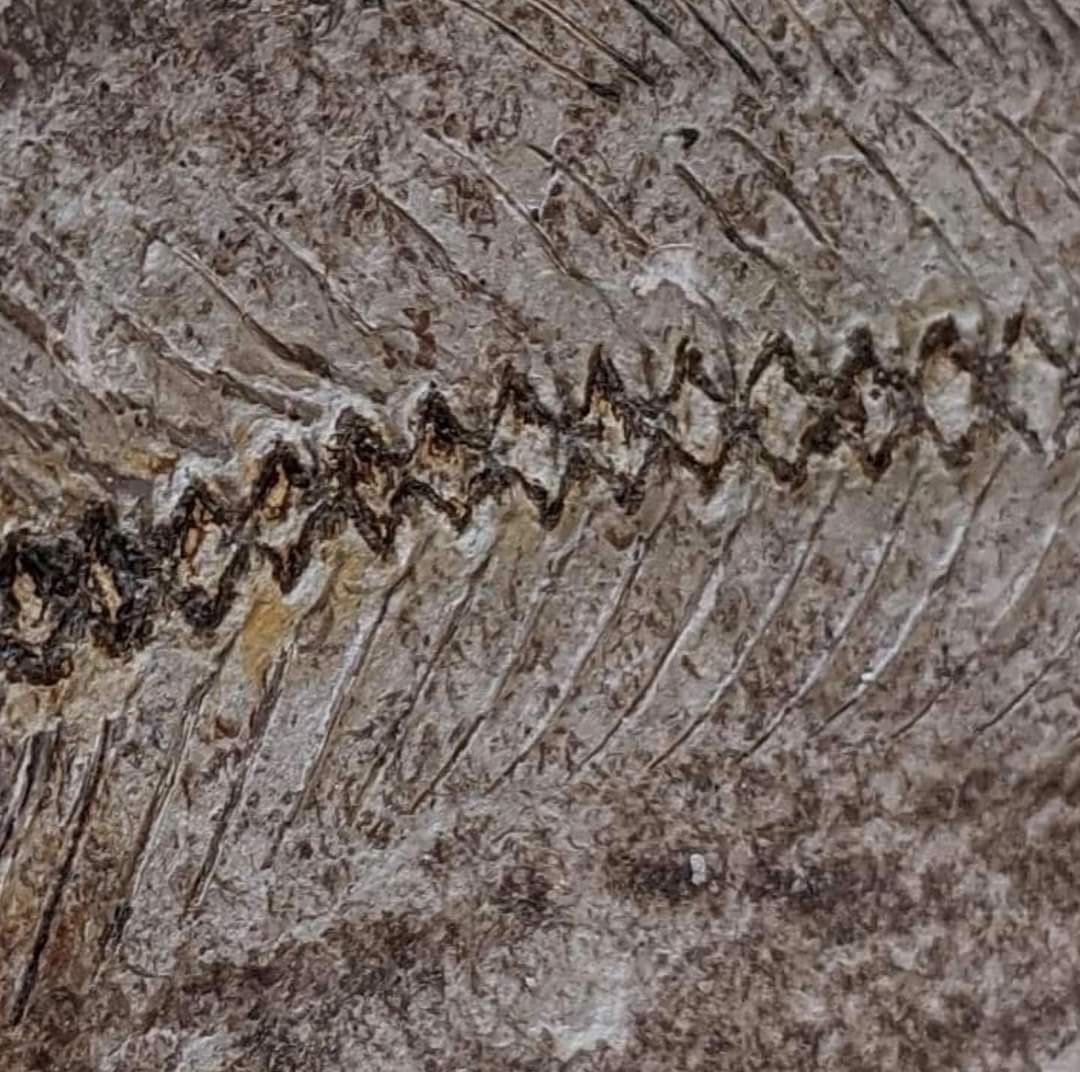
Vertebrae, ribs and scales

To facilitate the study of the known specimens, black latex peels were taken of the fossils and regions of the fossils. The latex was then coated in ammonium chloride dust to enhance contrast. As seen in most modern salmonids, the body shape of Eosalmo is a laterally flattened spindle-like and elongated body with fins placed as seen in the modern genera. Fossil adults with a standard length, excluding the tail, of up to an estimated 390 mm (15 in), with the largest complete adult measuring a SL of 361 mm (14.2 in) long. The total length when tail is included for the largest complete specimen is around 420 mm (17 in). The vertebral columns of adults range between 54-57 centra, which are grouped into the precaudal and caudal section. Between 32-34 belong to the precaudal skeleton, including the first 3 to 4 vertebra to the front of the cleithrum which have neural spines but do not have ribs. The caudal vertebra range between 22-24 in count and includes rear most two, the urals, that are in the central section of the caudal fin and upwardly angled from the rest of the vertebral column.

The cycloid scales of Eosalmo are small, absent from the head, and present in series of more than two lateral line scales to each vertebral centrum. The scales have a vaguely square outline possessing a nearly centrally located growth origin and with no ridges run from the center to the edges. The frontal areas of the scale have a broadly rounded margin and widely spaced concentric ridges, while the narrower posterior region has less ridges and a slightly scalloped margin. Wilson (1977) mentions one fish specimen displaying possible chromatophores scattered on the opercular region but not extending onto the frontal bones.

Two unique characters were identified in Eosalmo to separate the genus from extant salmonids. The subopercle exhibits an anterodorsal process which meets the edge of the subopercle at approximately a 60° angle. Also unique is the basihyal tooth plate, which is broad, flat, thin, and lacking any teeth along the edges while modern salmonids possess stout teeth along the edge of the basihyal. A series of characters were put forward to support the basal placement of Eosalmo in the subfamily Salmoninae. The scales on genera of Coregoninae and Thymallinae are notedly larger than Salmoninae genera, and restricted to 2 or less per vertebrae length in the lateral lines. The enlargement of the first uroneural tail bone, found on the upper side of the tail base, into a fan-shaped bone called a stegural is unique in the family to Salmoninae.

== Paleoecology ==
The Okanagan highlands lakes are thought to have drained westward out of the montane regions to the Pacific Ocean's paleo-coastlines. Fossils found at Driftwood display a full range of individuals from young juveniles through adults. This range suggests that E. driftwoodensis was completely a freshwater dwelling species rather than being anadromous like many modern salmon which spend much of their adult life in saltwater. At other sites in the highlands, such as at Republic, specimens are predominantly adults, which suggests that some lake populations involved potamodromous migration with the young fishes staying in surrounding streams and the adults migrating into the lake. The fully freshwater lifecycle of Eosalmo is supported by the sister-group placement of the Esocidae (pike and mudminnows) to Salmonidae. Cretaceous pike ancestors such as Oldmanesox and Estesesox have both been recovered from strictly freshwater formations of North America. At Quilchena, Eosalmo has been suggested to be one of the apex fish predators of that lake system, with birds being the most prevalent fish predator overall.

== Paleoenvironment ==
The Eocene Okanagan Highlands sites as a group represent upland lake systems that were surrounded by a warm temperate ecosystem with nearby volcanism. The highlands likely had a mesic upper microthermal to lower mesothermal climate, in which winter temperatures rarely dropped low enough for snow, and which were seasonably equitable. The Okanagan highlands paleoforest surrounding the lakes have been described as precursors to the modern temperate broadleaf and mixed forests of Eastern North America and Eastern Asia. Based on the fossil biotas the lakes were higher and cooler then the coeval coastal forests preserved in the Puget Group and Chuckanut Formation of Western Washington, which are described as lowland tropical forest ecosystems. Estimates of the paleoelevation range between 0.7–1.2 km (0.43–0.75 mi) higher than the coastal forests. This is consistent with the paleoelevation estimates for the lake systems, which range between 1.1–2.9 km (1,100–2,900 m), which is similar to the modern elevation 0.8 km (0.50 mi), but higher.

Estimates of the mean annual temperature have been derived from climate leaf analysis multivariate program (CLAMP) and leaf margin analysis (LMA) of the Republic and Princeton paleofloras. The CLAMP results after multiple linear regressions for Republic gave a mean annual temperature of approximately 8.0 °C (46.4 °F), with the LMA giving 9.2 ± 2.0 °C (48.6 ± 3.6 °F). CLAMP results from Princeton returned the lower 5.1 °C (41.2 °F), confirmed by the LMA with a mean annual temperature of 5.1 ± 2.2 °C (41.2 ± 4.0 °F). Both Formations are lower than the mean annual temperature estimates given for the coastal Puget Group, which is estimated to have been between 15–18.6 °C (59.0–65.5 °F). The bioclimatic analysis suggests mean annual precipitation amounts of 115 ± 39 cm (45 ± 15 in) for Republic, and 114 ± 42 cm (45 ± 17 in) for Princeton.
