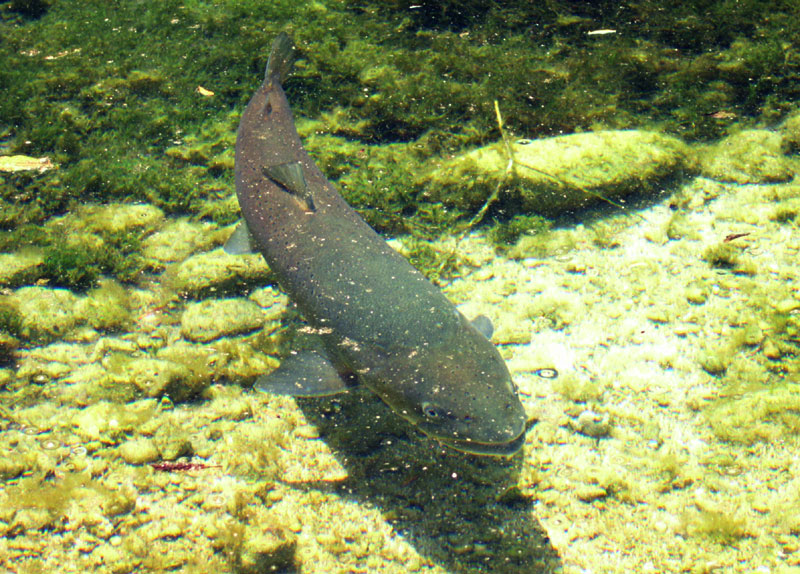

Conservation status
- Data Deficient (IUCN 3.1)

Scientific classification
- Kingdom: Animalia
- Phylum: Chordata
- Class: Actinopterygii
- Order: Salmoniformes
- Family: Salmonidae
- Genus: Hucho
- Species: H. ishikawae

Binomial name
- Hucho ishikawae T. Mori, 1928

= Hucho ishikawae =

Species of fish

Hucho ishikawae, the Korean taimen, is a species of salmonid fish found in the border region between North Korea and China, including the Am-nok or Yalu, Dok-ro, Weon-ju and Jang-jin Rivers. Monitoring of the species has been made very difficult because of the lack of access to the areas in which this species occurs and consequently it is rated as data deficient by the IUCN. It is found in flowing water and reaches up to 50 cm (20 in) in length. Like others of the Hucho genus this fish is an active predator.
