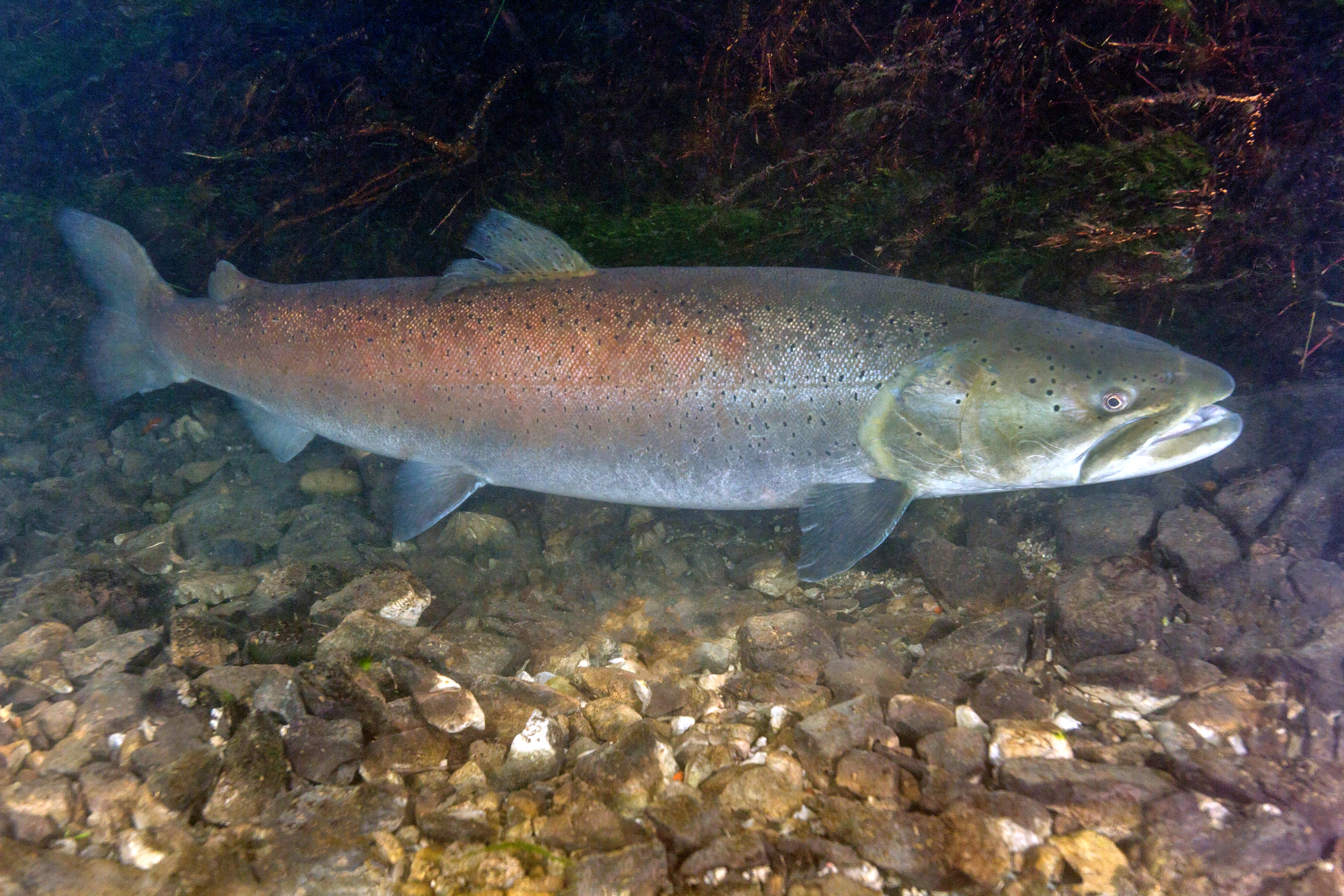
- Hucho hucho

Scientific classification
- Kingdom: Animalia
- Phylum: Chordata
- Class: Actinopterygii
- Division: Teleostei
- Order: Salmoniformes
- Family: Salmonidae
- Subfamily: Salmoninae
- Genus: Hucho; Günther, 1866

Type species
- Salmo hucho Linnaeus, 1758

= Hucho =

Hucho Temporal range: Late Oligocene–present

Genus of fishes

Hucho is a genus of large piscivorous salmonid fish known as taimens (from Finnish taimen, 'trout', through Russian: тайме́нь, romanized: tayménʹ), and is closely related to Pacific trout and lenoks (all belonging to the same tribe in the subfamily Salmoninae). Native to the cold rivers and other freshwater habitats in Eurasia, they are threatened by overfishing and habitat loss.

The earliest fossil remains of this genus are known from the Late Oligocene to middle Miocene of the Vitim Plateau in Russia. Younger remains are also known from the Late Miocene of Ukraine and the Late Pleistocene of Germany. Fossil specimens of a Hucho-like salmonid have been recovered from the Clarkia fossil beds and other localities from the late Neogene of western North America, suggesting they may have potentially inhabited North America too.

== Species ==
The currently recognized species in this genus are:

Image	Scientific name	Common name	Distribution
	Hucho bleekeri Sh. Kimura, 1934	Sichuan taimen	Yangtze basin in China
	Hucho hucho (Linnaeus, 1758)	huchen, Danube salmon	endemic to the Danube basin in Europe
	Hucho ishikawae T. Mori, 1928	Korean taimen	North Korea and China
	Hucho taimen (Pallas, 1773)	Siberian taimen, Siberian giant trout, and Siberian salmon	Siberia

In addition, the Sakhalin taimen was formerly placed in this genus, but genetics and other evidence has shown that it belongs in its own monotypic genus as Parahucho perryi.
