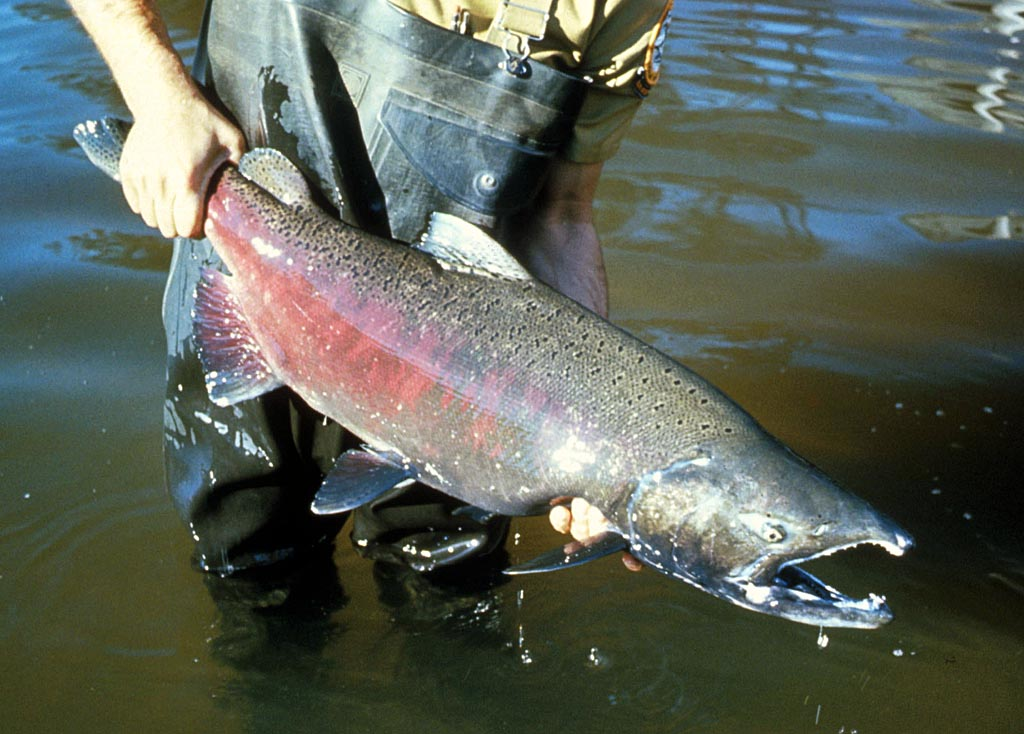
- Chinook salmon (Oncorhynchus tschawytscha)

Scientific classification
- Kingdom: Animalia
- Phylum: Chordata
- Class: Actinopterygii
- Division: Teleostei
- Order: Salmoniformes
- Suborder: Salmonoidei; Bleeker, 1859
- Family: Salmonidae; G. Cuvier, 1816

Type species
- Salmo salar Linnaeus, 1758

Genera
- See text

= Salmonidae =

Salmonidae Temporal range: Late Cretaceous (Campanian) to recent

Family of ray-finned fishes

Salmonidae (/sælˈmɒnɪdiː/, lit. 'salmon-like') is a family of ray-finned fish, the only extant member of the suborder Salmonoidei, consisting of 11 extant genera and over 200 species collectively known as "salmonids" or "salmonoids". The family includes salmon (both Atlantic and Pacific species), trout (both ocean-going and landlocked), char, graylings, freshwater whitefishes, taimens and lenoks, all coldwater mid-level predatory fish that inhabit the subarctic and cool temperate waters of the Northern Hemisphere. The Atlantic salmon (Salmo salar), whose Latin name became that of its genus Salmo, is also the eponym of the family and order names.

Salmonids have a relatively primitive appearance among teleost fish, with the pelvic fins being placed far back, and an adipose fin towards the rear of the back. They have slender bodies with rounded scales and forked tail fins, and their mouths contain a single row of sharp teeth. Although the smallest salmonid species is just 13 cm (5.1 in) long for adults, most salmonids are much larger, with the largest reaching 2 m (6 ft 7 in).

All salmonids are migratory fish that spawn in the shallow gravel beds of freshwater headstreams, spend the growing juvenile years in rivers, creeks, small lakes and wetlands, but migrate downstream upon maturity and spend most of their adult lives at much larger waterbodies. Many salmonid species are euryhaline and migrate to the sea or brackish estuaries as soon as they approach adulthood, returning to the upper streams only to reproduce. Such sea-run life cycle is described as anadromous, and other freshwater salmonids that migrate purely between lakes and rivers are considered potamodromous. Salmonids are carnivorous predators of the middle food chain, feeding on smaller fish, crustaceans, aquatic insects and larvae, tadpoles and sometimes fish eggs (even those of their own kind), and in turn being preyed upon by larger predators. Many species of salmonids are thus considered keystone organisms important for both freshwater and terrestrial ecosystems due to the biomass transfer provided by their mass migration from oceanic to inland waterbodies.

== Evolution ==
Current salmonids comprise three main clades taxonomically treated as subfamilies: Coregoninae (freshwater whitefishes), Thymallinae (graylings), and Salmoninae (trout, salmon, char, taimens and lenoks). Generally, all three lineages are accepted to allocate a suite of derived traits indicating a monophyletic group.

The suborder Salmonoidei, containing only Salmonidae, is one of two extant clades within the order Salmoniformes, which first appeared during the Santonian and Campanian stages of the Late Cretaceous. The other is the Esocoidei, which contains the pikes and mudminnows. Formerly, many more families were included within this group, but all have since been reclassified into their own orders. During the early 21st century, Salmoniformes was redefined to include only Salmonidae as a monotypic order. However, as recent phylogenetic studies have affirmed the relationship between the Salmonoidei and Esocoidei, the latter have returned to being considered a suborder of Salmoniformes.

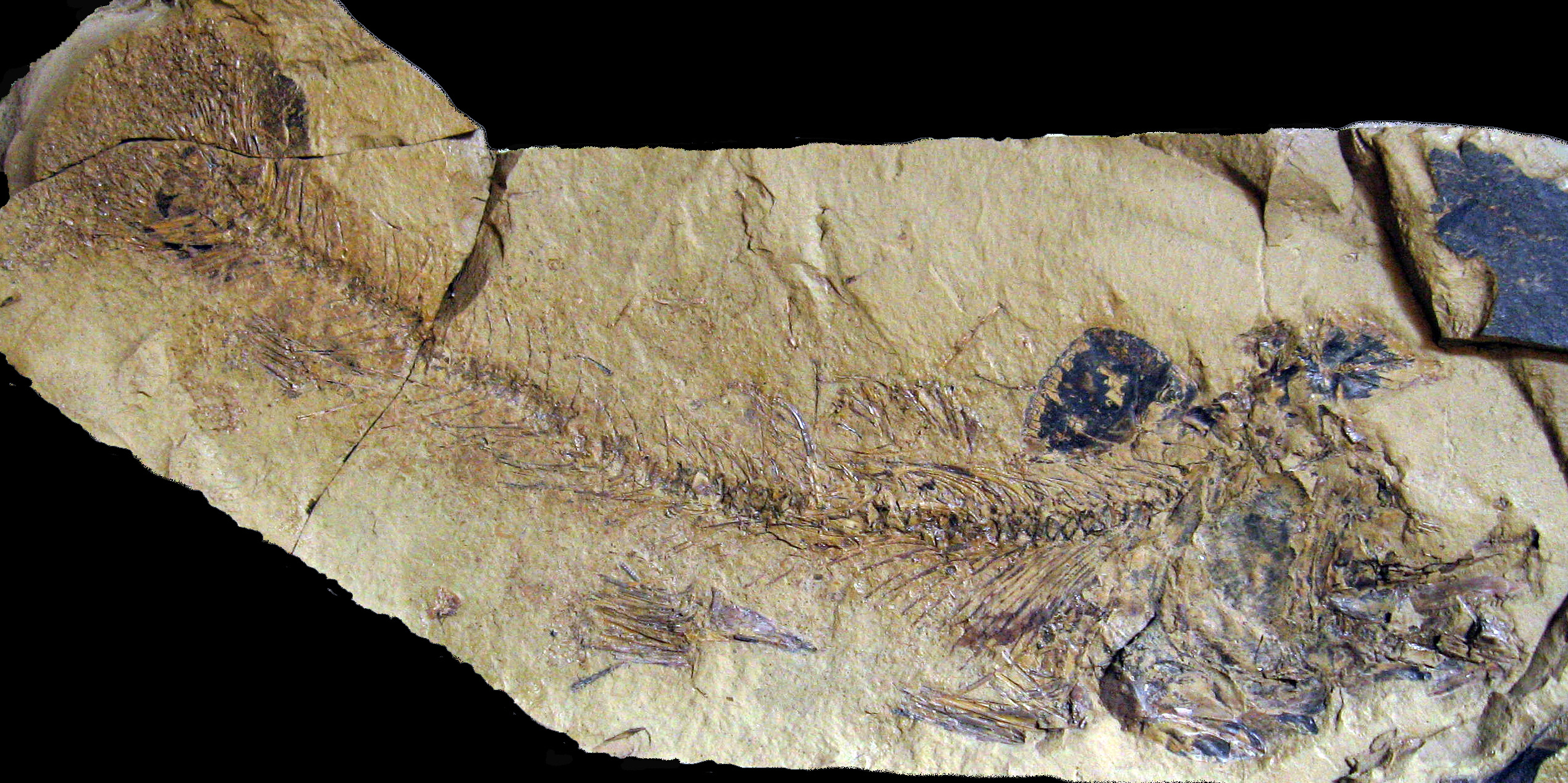
Eosalmo driftwoodensis fossil Klondike Mountain Formation

It is thought that salmon and pike diverged from one another during the Cretaceous, but until 2025, there was no fossil evidence of salmonids occurring during this time period. In 2025, the earliest known fossil salmonid, Sivulliusalmo alaskensis, was described from the early Maastrichtian-aged Prince Creek Formation of Alaska, with indeterminate remains of this genus also being identified from the older Campanian-aged Dinosaur Park Formation of Alberta. The occurrence of Sivulliusalmo in these northern habitats suggests that the modern salmonid preference for cool, high-latitude waters is an ancient, conserved trait.

Prior to the description of Sivulliusalmo, the earliest record of salmonids was the Early Eocene-aged Eosalmo driftwoodensis, a stem-salmonine, which was first described from fossils found at Driftwood Creek, central British Columbia, and has been recovered from most sites in the Eocene Okanagan Highlands. This genus shares traits found in all three subfamily lineages. Hence, E. driftwoodensis is an archaic salmonid, representing an important stage in salmonid evolution. Fossil scales of coregonines are known from the Late Eocene or Early Oligocene of California.

A gap appears in the salmonine fossil record after E. driftwoodensis until about 7 million years ago (mya), in the Late Miocene, when trout-like fossils appear in Idaho, in the Clarkia Lake beds. Several of these species appear to be Oncorhynchus—the current genus for Pacific salmon and Pacific trout. The presence of these species so far inland established that Oncorhynchus was not only present in the Pacific drainages before the beginning of the Pliocene (~5–6 mya), but also that rainbow and cutthroat trout, and Pacific salmon lineages had diverged before the beginning of the Pliocene. Consequently, the split between Oncorhynchus and Salmo (Atlantic salmon and European trout) must have occurred well before the Pliocene. Suggestions have gone back as far as the Early Miocene (about 20 mya).

=== Genetics ===
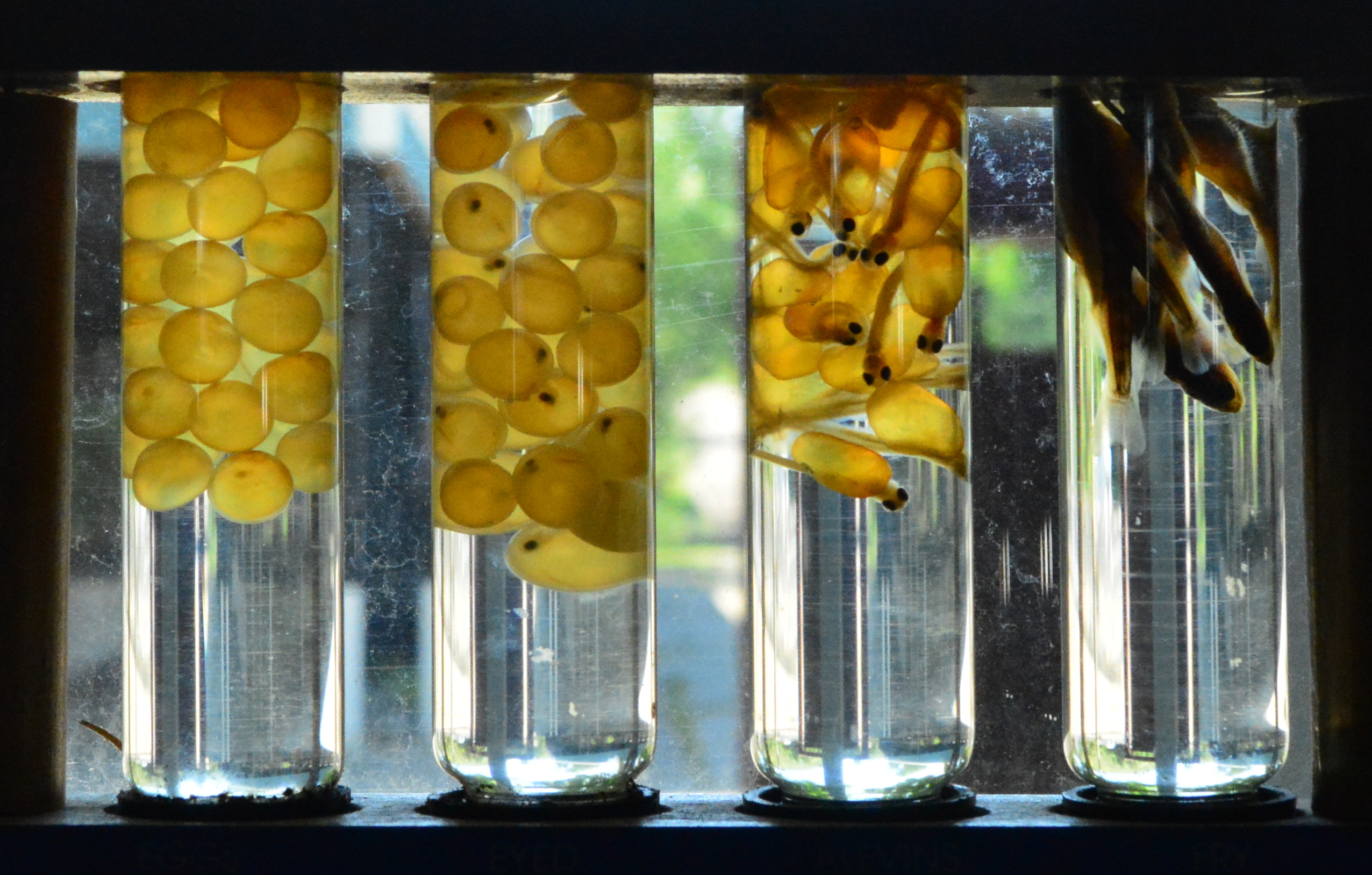
Oncorhynchus mykiss maturing from eggs.

Based on the most current evidence, salmonids diverged from the rest of teleost fish no later than 88 million years ago, during the late Cretaceous. This divergence was marked by a whole-genome duplication event in the ancestral salmonid, where the diploid ancestor became tetraploid. This duplication is the fourth of its kind to happen in the evolutionary lineage of the salmonids, with two having occurred commonly to all bony vertebrates, and another specifically in the teleost fishes.

Extant salmonids all show evidence of partial tetraploidy, as studies show the genome has undergone selection to regain a diploid state. Work done in the rainbow trout (Onchorhynchus mykiss) has shown that the genome is still partially-tetraploid. Around half of the duplicated protein-coding genes have been deleted, but all apparent miRNA sequences still show full duplication, with potential to influence regulation of the rainbow trout's genome. This pattern of partial tetraploidy is thought to be reflected in the rest of extant salmonids.

The earliest presumed crown-group salmonid fish (E. driftwoodensis) does not appear until the middle Eocene. This fossil already displays traits associated with extant salmonids, but as the genome of E. driftwoodensis cannot be sequenced, it cannot be confirmed if polyploidy was present in this animal at this point in time.

Given a lack of earlier transition fossils, and the inability to extract genomic data from specimens other than extant species, the dating of the whole-genome duplication event in salmonids was historically a very broad categorization of times, ranging from 25 to 100 million years in age. New advances in calibrated relaxed molecular clock analyses have allowed for a closer examination of the salmonid genome, and has allowed for a more precise dating of the whole-genome duplication of the group, that places the latest possible date for the event at 88 million years ago.

This more precise dating and examination of the salmonid whole-genome duplication event has allowed more speculation on the radiation of species within the group. Historically, the whole-genome duplication event was thought to be the reason for the variation within Salmonidae. Current evidence done with molecular clock analyses revealed that much of the speciation of the group occurred during periods of intense climate change associated with the last ice ages, with especially high speciation rates being observed in salmonids that developed an anadromous lifestyle.

== Classification ==
Together with the closely related orders Esociformes (pikes and mudminnows), Osmeriformes (true smelts) and Argentiniformes (marine smelts and barreleyes), Salmoniformes comprise the superorder Protacanthopterygii.

The only extant family within Salmoniformes, Salmonidae, is divided into three subfamilies and around 11 genera containing about 243 species. The concepts of the number of species recognized vary among researchers and authorities; the numbers presented below represent the higher estimates of diversity:

Phylogeny of Salmonidae

- - Coregoninae
    - Prosopium
    - - Stenodus
      - Coregonus
  - - Thymallinae
      Thymallus
    - Salmoninae
      - - Salmo
        - Salvelinus
          (incl. Salvethymus)
      - - Oncorhynchus
        - - Brachymystax
          - - Parahucho
            - Hucho

Order Salmoniformes

- Family: Salmonidae
  - †Sivulliusalmo Brinkman et al., 2025 (1 species, Late Cretaceous)
  - Subfamily: Coregoninae
    - Coregonus Linnaeus, 1758 - whitefishes (78 species)
    - Prosopium Jordan, 1878 - round whitefishes (6 species)
    - Stenodus Richardson, 1836 - beloribitsa and nelma (2 species)
    - †Beckius David, 1946 (1 species, Oligocene)
    - †Parastenodus David, 1946 (1 species, Eocene)
  - Subfamily: Thymallinae
    - Thymallus Linck, 1790 - graylings (14 species)
  - Subfamily: Salmoninae
    - †Eosalmo Wilson, 1977 (1 species, Eocene)
    - †Paleolox Kimmel, 1975 (1 species, Late Miocene)
    - Tribe: Salmonini
      - Salmo Linnaeus, 1758 - Atlantic salmon and trout (47 species)
      - Salvelinus Richardson, 1836 - Char and trout (e.g., brook trout, lake trout) (51 species)
      - Salvethymus Chereshnev & Skopets, 1990 - Long-finned char (1 species)
    - Tribe: Oncorhynchini
      - Brachymystax Günther, 1866 - lenoks (4 species)
      - Hucho Günther, 1866 - taimens (4 species)
      - Oncorhynchus Suckley, 1861 - Pacific salmon and trout (12 species)
      - Parahucho Vladykov, 1963 - Sakhalin taimen (1 species)

== Hybrid crossbreeding ==
The following table shows results of hybrid crossbreeding combination in Salmonidae.

Crossbreeding
| Crossbreeding | | | male | | | | | | | | | | | |
| Crossbreeding | | | Salvelinus | | Oncorhynchus | | | | | | | | Salmo | |
|---|---|---|---|---|---|---|---|---|---|---|---|---|---|---|
| Crossbreeding | | | leucomaenis (white-spotted char) | fontinalis (Brook trout) | mykiss (Rainbow trout) | masou masou (masu salmon) | masou ishikawae (Amago Salmon) | gorbuscha (pink salmon) | nerka (Sockeye salmon) | keta (chum salmon) | kisutch (coho salmon) | tshawytscha (chinook salmon) | trutta (Brown trout) | salar (Atlantic Salmon) |
female
| female | (Salvelinus) | leucomaenis (white-spotted char) | - | O | X | O | O | | X | X | | | O | |
| female | (Salvelinus) | fontinalis (Brook trout) | O | - | X | O | O | | X | X | O | | X | X |
| female | (Oncorhynchus) | mykiss (Rainbow trout) | O | O | - | O | O | O | X | X | X | | X | X |
| female | (Oncorhynchus) | masou masou (masu salmon) | O | X | X | - | O | | X | X | O | O | X | |
| female | (Oncorhynchus) | masou ishikawae (Amago Salmon) | O | O | X | O | - | | X | | | | O | |
| female | (Oncorhynchus) | gorbuscha (pink salmon) | X | | | | | - | O | O | | O | | |
| female | (Oncorhynchus) | nerka (Sockeye salmon) | X | X | X | X | X | O | - | O | O | O | X | |
| female | (Oncorhynchus) | keta (chum salmon) | X | X | X | X | | O | O | - | O | X | | X |
| female | (Oncorhynchus) | kisutsh (coho salmon) | | X | X | | | O | O | X | - | O | X | X |
| female | (Oncorhynchus) | tshawytscha (chinook salmon) | | | | O | | O | O | X | O | - | | |
| female | Salmo | trutta (Brown trout) | O | O | X | O | O | | X | | X | | - | O |
| female | Salmo | salar (Atlantic Salmon) | | O | X | | | O | | X | X | | O | - |

note :- : The identical kind, O : (survivability), X : (Fatality)
