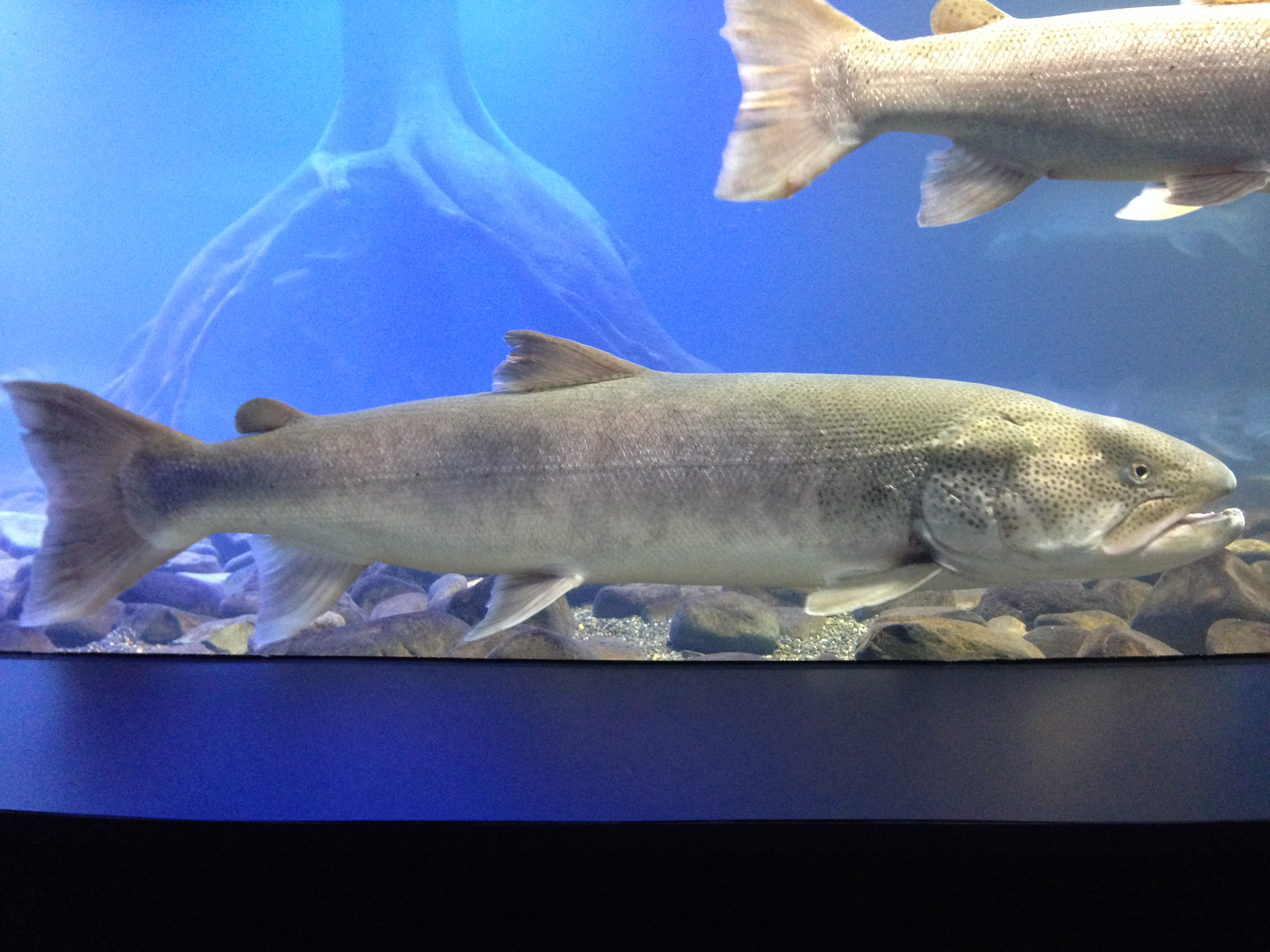

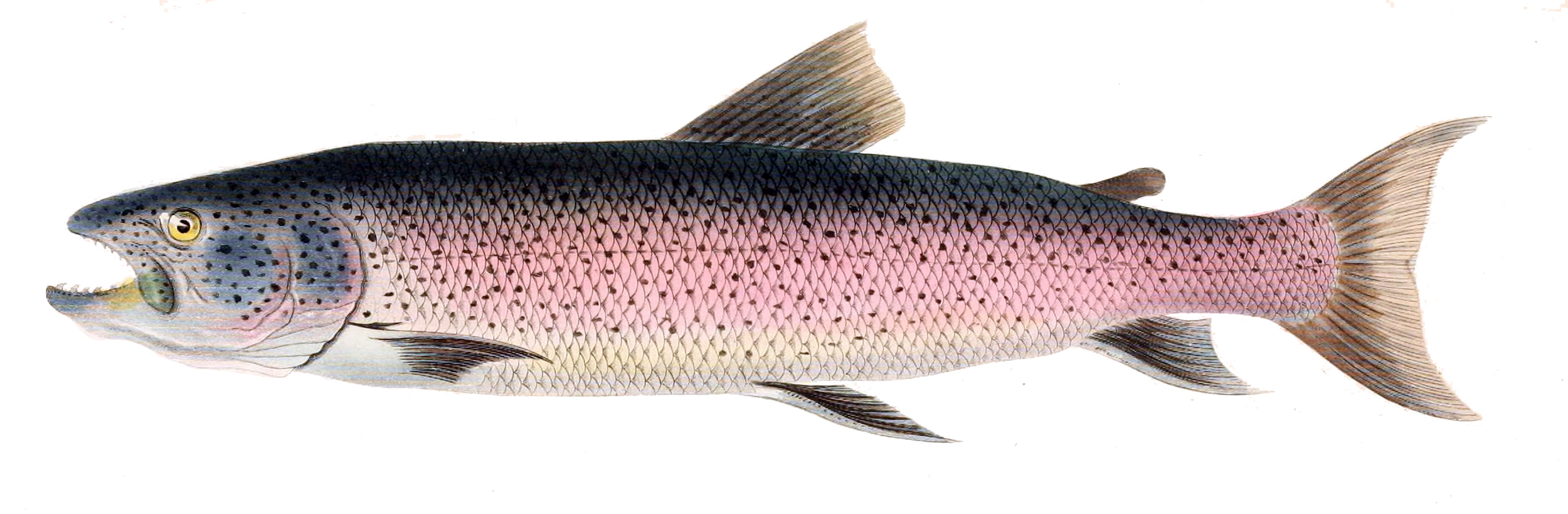

Conservation status
- Critically Endangered (IUCN 3.1)

Scientific classification
- Kingdom: Animalia
- Phylum: Chordata
- Class: Actinopterygii
- Order: Salmoniformes
- Family: Salmonidae
- Subfamily: Salmoninae
- Genus: Parahucho; Vladykov, 1963
- Species: P. perryi

Binomial name
- Parahucho perryi (Brevoort, 1856)

Synonyms
- Hucho perryi (Brevoort, 1856); Salmo blackistoni Hilgendorf, 1876; Salmo perryi Brevoort, 1856

= Sakhalin taimen =

Sakhalin taimen Temporal range: Middle Miocene to recent

Species of fish

The Sakhalin taimen (Parahucho perryi, syn. Hucho perryi), also known as the Japanese huchen or stringfish (Japanese: 伊富/イトウ, romanized: itō), is a large species of salmonid freshwater fish in Northeast Asia, found in the lakes and large rivers of Primorsky, Khabarovsk, Sakhalin and Kuril Islands of Far Eastern Russia, as well as Hokkaido of Japan. Although often placed in the genus Hucho, molecular phylogenetic and other evidence has shown that it belongs in its own monotypic genus Parahucho.

The population has been in general decline for a century at least, with contributory factors including degradation of the environment by logging, oil exploration and change of land use to agriculture. The fish is caught by commercial fishing as bycatch, by recreational anglers and illegally by poaching, and present populations are estimated to be less than 5% of their historic levels. The International Union for Conservation of Nature has rated the fish as being critically endangered.

The earliest known fossils of the genus are from the mid-late Miocene-aged Agnevo Formation of Sakhalin Island.

== Description ==
Parahucho perryi is one of the largest, most ancient salmon species and primarily inhabits the lower to middle reaches of lakes and rivers. Fish over 30 cm (1 ft) long are almost exclusively piscivores, while the young feed mostly on aquatic insects. Females typically lay between 2,000 and 10,000 eggs in the spring on the sandy or gravelly river bottom. The average specimens caught have weighed around 5 kg (11 lb). The largest fish caught was recorded at 15 kg (33 lb 1 oz) (IGFA world record). According to an unverified record from Japan, a fish with length of 2.1 m (6.9 ft) was captured in 1937 from the Tokachi River, Hokkaidō.

== Distribution ==
Parahucho perryi are found in the Northwest Pacific: Sakhalin Island (Russia), the Island of Hokkaidō (Japan), and parts of the far eastern Russian mainland. Some populations spend all their lives in freshwater while others are anadromous. The fish take about eight years to mature and can spawn several times during their lifetime which is estimated to be about fourteen years.

== Threats ==
The global population of the species has dwindled in recent years for a variety of reasons. The loss of more than 50% of their original habitat due to agriculture, urbanization, and more recently, oil and gas development, is a major factor. Other considerable pressures include bycatch in the commercial salmon fisheries of Russia and Japan, as well as illegal fishing practices in Russia. The fish are also prized as trophies by Japanese recreational anglers.

In Japan, this species is bred for game-fishing at managed fishing sites, and raised fish are available for purchase. However, the species remains critically endangered.

== Status ==
Since 2006, the IUCN has listed Parahucho perryi as critically endangered based on the assessment completed by the Salmonid Specialist Group. This designation represents the highest potential risk of global extinction to the species. The assessment revealed that the range-wide population has dropped in size to less than 5% of historic levels.
