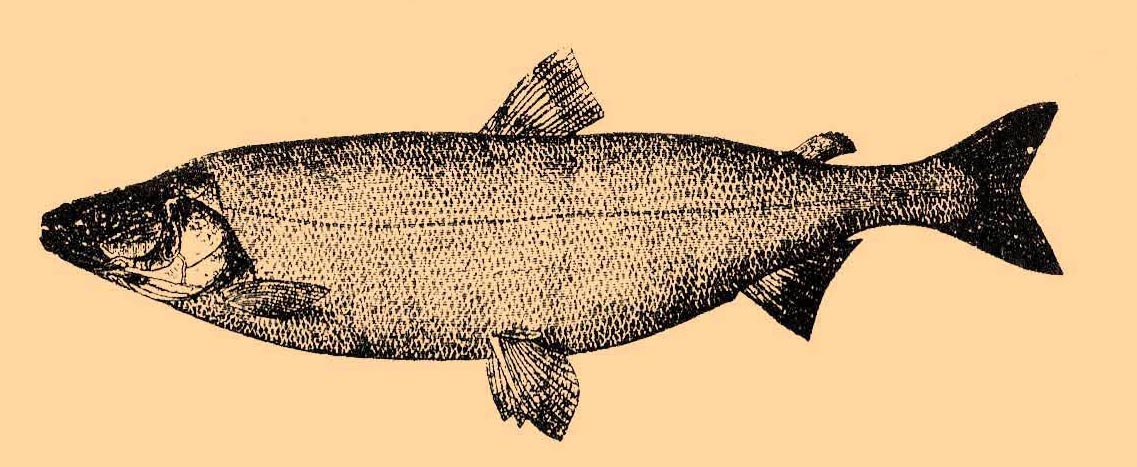

Conservation status
- Near Threatened (IUCN 3.1)

Scientific classification
- Kingdom: Animalia
- Phylum: Chordata
- Class: Actinopterygii
- Order: Salmoniformes
- Family: Salmonidae
- Genus: Stenodus
- Species: S. leucichthys

Binomial name
- Stenodus leucichthys (Güldenstädt, 1772)

Synonyms
- Salmo leucichthys Güldenstädt, 1772; Stenodus leucichthys leucichthys (Güldenstädt, 1772); Salmo nelma (non Pallas, 1773)

= Stenodus leucichthys =

Species of fish

Stenodus leucichthys, also known as the inconnu, sheefish, ak balyk, or beloribitsa, is a species of large, anadromous, freshwater whitefish in the family Salmonidae. In the strict sense its natural distribution is restricted to the Caspian Sea basin. It was formerly considered extinct in the wild, but survives in cultured stocks. The nelma (Stenodus nelma), a more widespread species of Eurasia and North America, is sometimes considered its subspecies.

== Systematics ==
Alternatively, the name Stenodus leucichtys has previously been used in a broader sense, referring to a widespread species composed of two subspecies, which if true would make it the sole extant representative of the Stenodus genus. In addition to the landlocked subspecies Stenodus leucichthys leucichthys, it comprises the nelma, Stenodus leucichthys nelma (Pallas, 1773) which lives in Eurasian and North American rivers of the Arctic basin. Despite this designation, nelma, similarly known as the sheefish or inconnu, is currently often considered to be a distinct species Stenodus nelma, which makes the legitimacy of this use case and its inclusion of both species as one debatable.

At a higher level, the genus Stenodus is not considered phylogenetically distinct from the broader lake whitefish genus Coregonus, although it is phenotypically distinct due to its large size and specialized predator morphology. This is due to conflicting evidence regarding the monophyly of the Coregonus genus and its relationship to Stenodus, either being sister to or nested within Coregonus, with several studies backing both arguments. Possible reasons for conflicting results include the relatively new age of the clade that contains both genera, which diverged approximately 10 million years ago, and the lack of sufficient data on the effect of hybridization between and within each genera. While the most recent mitogenomic analysis does support the monophyly of Coregonus, evidence of the Atlantic whitefish species, C. huntsmani, being more basal to the whitefish genus than the Stenodus genus suggests it being paraphyletic.

== Description ==
The inconnu has a large, terminal mouth with a protruding lower jaw, a high and pointed dorsal fin, a forked and homocercal tail, and possesses an adipose fin. It is generally silvery white on the body sides and underbelly with a green, blue, or pale brown back. The meat is white, flaky, sweet, and somewhat oily. It has an elongate, fusiform body plan of up to 130 centimetres (51 in) in total length and weighing up to 35 kilograms (77 lb). Males exhibit slight sexual dimorphism during spawning, developing nuptial tubercles on its head and body side. Additionally, Stenodus leucichthys, and the closely related nelma, are distinct among whitefish due to their more predatory morphologies. In addition to being extremely closely related species, S. leucichthys and S. nelma are also largely indistinguishable in appearance, however, the two species should not be confused given their ranges occupy different continents.

== Biology ==
Stenodus leucichthys is an anadromous fish, meaning it migrates up stream into fresh waters from the sea in order to spawn and reproduce externally. Egg development can last up to 200 days, culminating in the release of over 100 thousand eggs, with each individual spawning twice during their life cycle (every 2 to 3 years). Migrations can last up to or exceeding a year long, this is partially owing to the slow development of their gonads which can require up to 8 months spent in the river to fully mature, just in time for their spawning season. In terms of development, inconnu larvae reach the fingerling stage at approximately 30 to 40 days and have a maturation period lasting 3 to 6 years, with males typically reaching maturity about one year earlier. Although historically calculated based on their scales, age is most accurately measured by analyzing the otolith or fin rays, particularly pectoral fin rays, of Stenodus as crowding of scales in old age fish reduces the accuracy and readability of these measurements. However, the accuracy of these measurements has only been analyzed in the North American populations of the closely related, or possible subspecies, Stenodus nelma.

The fish eat plankton and aquatic insect larvae as juveniles and then become predators of smaller fish almost exclusively in adulthood. However, 30-day old fingerlings stomach contents have been observed to contain the larvae and juveniles of smaller fish species, indicating that this predatory transition occurs during very early life stages. As an adult, its primary food source, comprising over 90% of its diet, is small pelagic fish which mainly consisted of native kilka and silverside, with less reliance on Caspian roach and gobiids, prior to its extirpation.

== Distribution ==
Endemic to the Caspian Sea, the Caspian inconnu is now Near Threatened, with current populations confined to hatcheries or only maintained due to stocking. Within the Caspian, inconnus live primarily in the central and southern parts of the sea during summer months but are also often found in the Northern Caspian for feeding during autumn and winter months.

Historically, ak balyk used to inhabit particularly the Volga, Ural and Terek rivers, and migrate up to 3,000 kilometres (1,900 mi) upstream from the Caspian to their main spawning grounds Kama River until dam construction and river contamination limited migration past the city of Volgograd. In addition to the Kama tributary, their major spawning grounds included the Oka and Sura tributaries among others along the greater Volga River. Alternatively, the closely related nelma has a broad, arctic and sub-arctic distribution extending from northern Eurasia to north-west North America.

== Habitat ==
Inconnus are pelagic fish that do not exceed depths of 60 to 65 metres (197 to 213 ft), typically inhabiting 25 to 45 metres (82 to 148 ft) depths. It is euryhaline given its anadromous spawning migration, allowing them to survive in fresh and brackish waters with increased salinity tolerances developing in fingerlings around the age of 30 to 50 days. A primarily cold-water species, inconnu prefer temperatures below 20°C and will only be found in the North Caspian when temperatures reach around 10°C.

== Conservation status ==
Following the construction of dams and hydropower reservoirs, particularly the Volgograd dam in 1959, the migration and natural reproduction of this species has been completely impeded with no efforts to reestablish their natural migration routes. Historically, their food supply was sustained by native small fish until the introduction of invasive comb jelly Mnemiopsis into the Caspian and the decline of prey fish stocks, especially kilka, degraded their food supplies, which contributed to its decline as well. Today, the taxon is considered to be Near Threatened by the IUCN Red List. The stock however survives in hatcheries, particularly those established in the Volga River, and some populations are maintained by stocking.

== Human use ==
In the past, inconnu was a very important commercial fish, with its fat-rich meat making it ideal for smoking. Smoked whitefish is typically referred to as balyk in the Turkic-speaking areas of this region and is likely the origin for the species' Kazakh name, ak balyk. While annual commercial catch rates used to exceed 1000 tons in the early to mid-20th century, the rapidly declining population has led to a ban on commercial fishing of Stenodus leucichthys, with fishing only done for reproductive purposes in support of hatcheries and only at special fishing sites. While this ban was lifted in the 1980s due to artificial reproduction efforts, it was reestablished because of continued population decline from illegal fishing, river contamination, and hatcheries releasing fewer fingerlings. During this ban lift, the inconnu served as an important fish for restocking in the Caspian, however these efforts were largely reduced in the 1990s due to further population decline.
