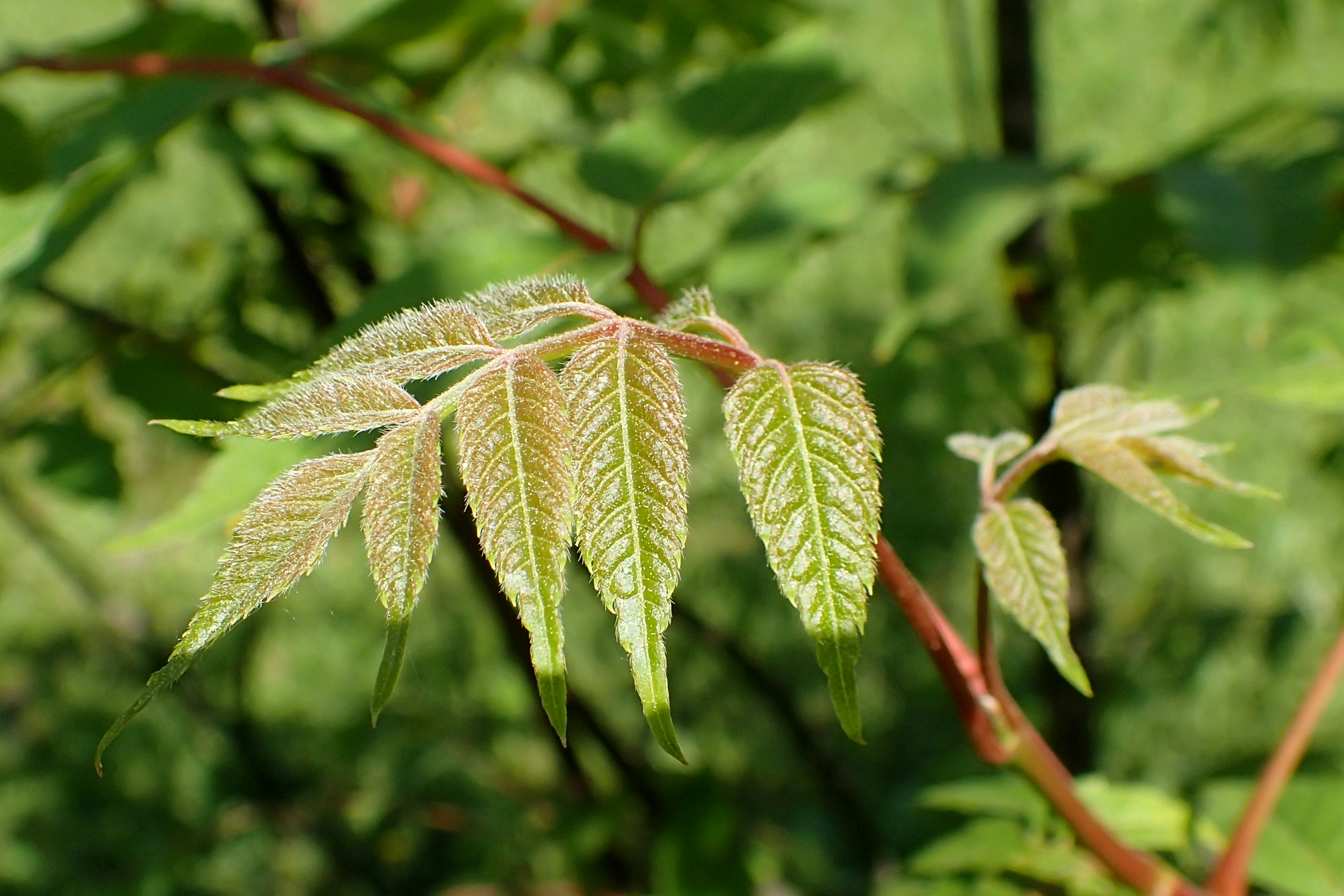
- Dipteronia sinensis, Berlin Botanical Gardens
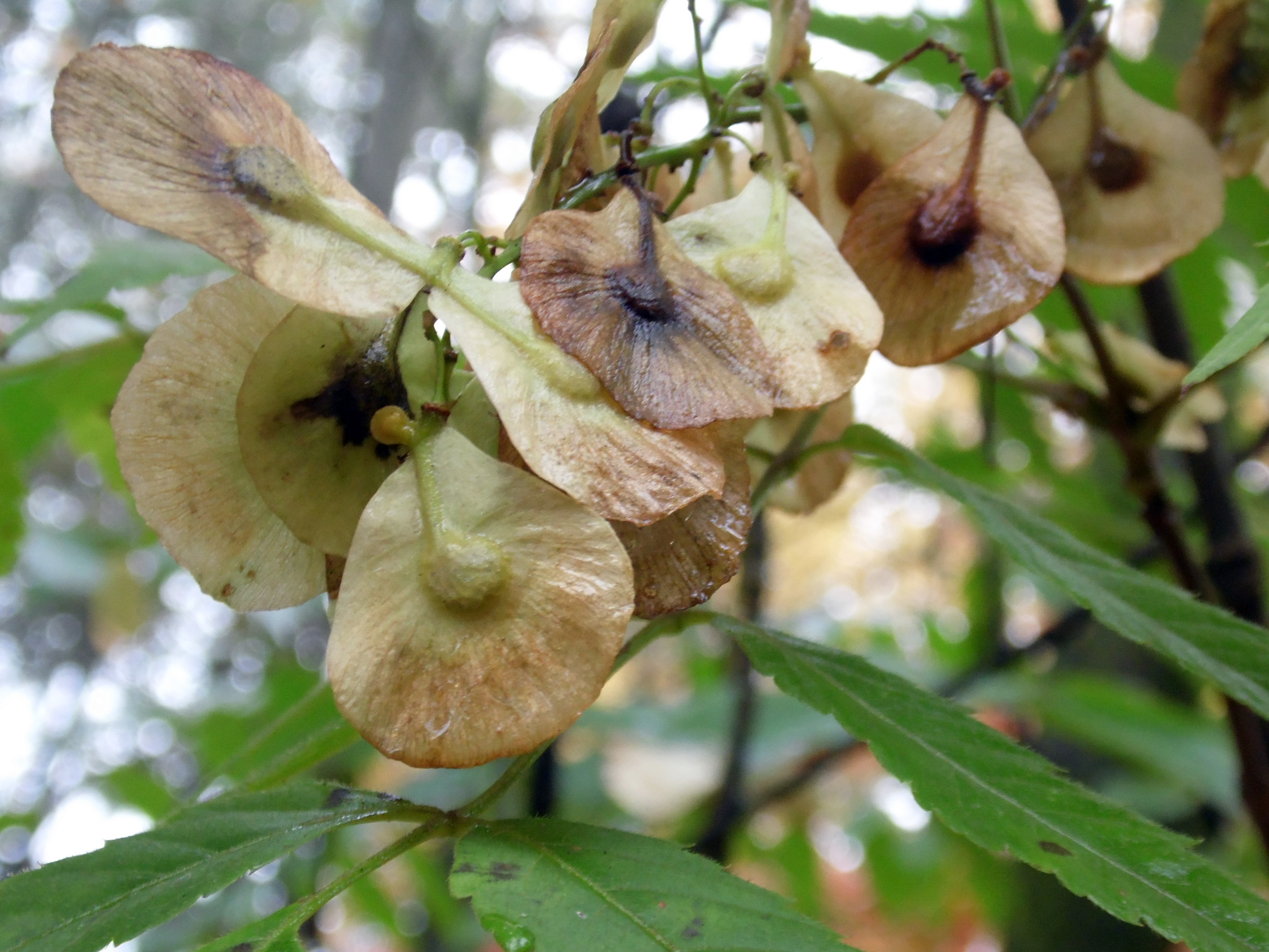
- Cluster of winged seeds of Dipteronia sinensis

Scientific classification
- Kingdom: Plantae
- Clade: Embryophytes
- Clade: Tracheophytes
- Clade: Spermatophytes
- Clade: Angiosperms
- Clade: Eudicots
- Clade: Rosids
- Order: Sapindales
- Family: Sapindaceae
- Subfamily: Hippocastanoideae
- Tribe: Acereae
- Genus: Dipteronia; Oliv.

Species
- †Dipteronia brownii; Dipteronia dyeriana; Dipteronia sinensis

= Dipteronia =

Dipteronia Temporal range: Middle Paleocene - Recent

Genus of flowering plants

Dipteronia is a genus with two living and one extinct species in the soapberry family Sapindaceae. The living species are native to central and southern China. The fossil species has been found in Middle Paleocene to Early Oligocene sediments of North America and China.

== Classification ==
Older classifications segregated the maples (Acer) and Dipteronia into the family Aceraceae, however work by the Angiosperm Phylogeny Group (APG I onward) and related investigations led to the subsuming of Acereae into Sapindaceae as the tribe Acereae. Dipteronia is considered to be the sister genus to Acer.

== Description ==
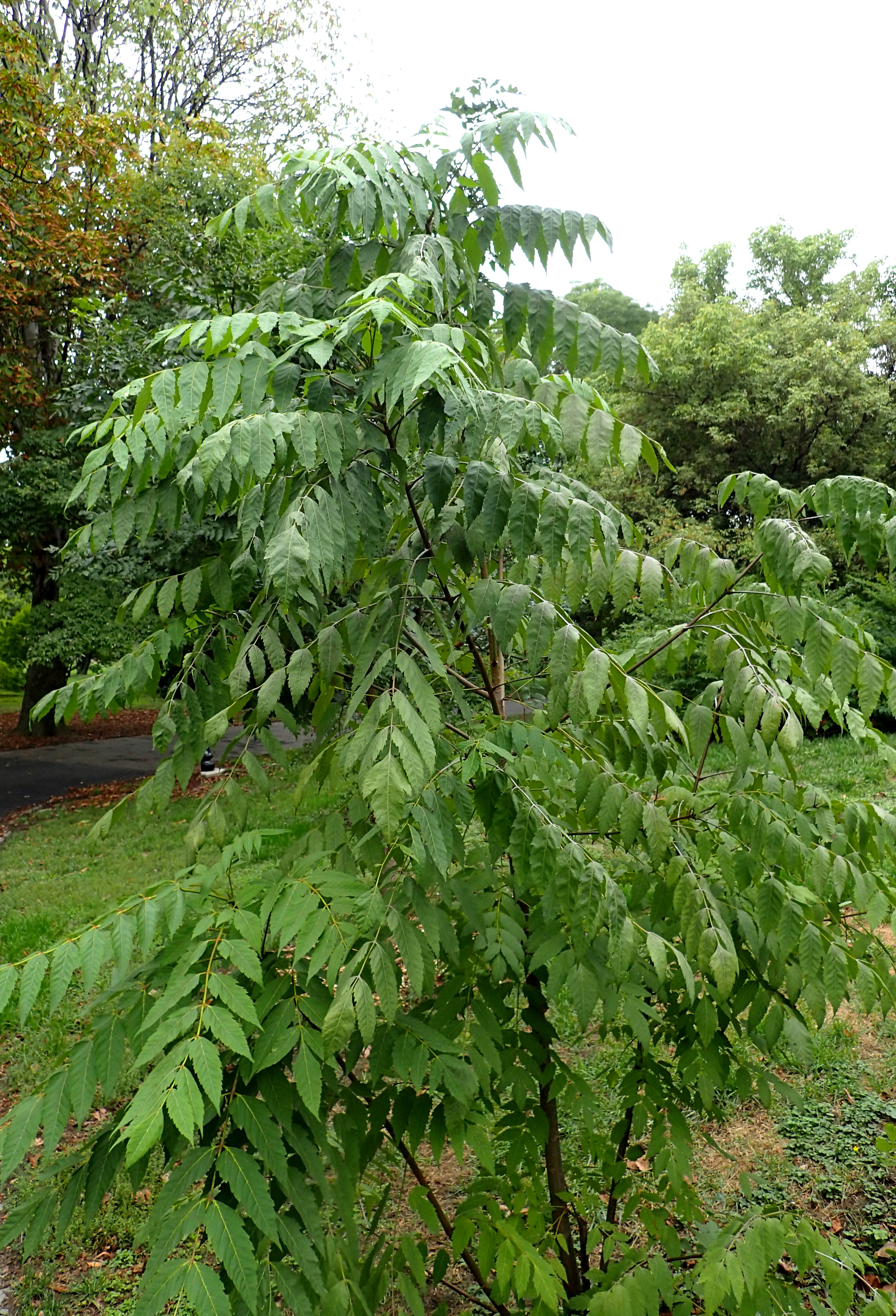
Shrub-sized specimen of Dipteronia sinensis

They are deciduous flowering shrubs or small trees, reaching 10–15 m (33–49 ft) tall. The leaf arrangement is opposite and pinnate with between 7 - 15 leaflets on each leaf. The inflorescences are paniculate, terminal or axillary. The flowers have five sepals and petals; staminate flowers have eight stamens, and bisexual flowers have a two-celled ovary. The fruit is a rounded samara containing two compressed nutlets, flat, encircled by a broad wing which turns from light green to red with ripening.

The name Dipteronia stems from the Greek "di-" (two, both) & "pteron" (wings), from the winged fruits with wings on both sides of the seed.

There are only two living species, Dipteronia sinensis and Dipteronia dyeriana; both are endemic to mainland China. Dipteronia dyeriana is listed by the IUCN as being a "Red List" threatened species, and known from only five isolated populations in south-eastern Yunnan Province.

== Fossil record ==
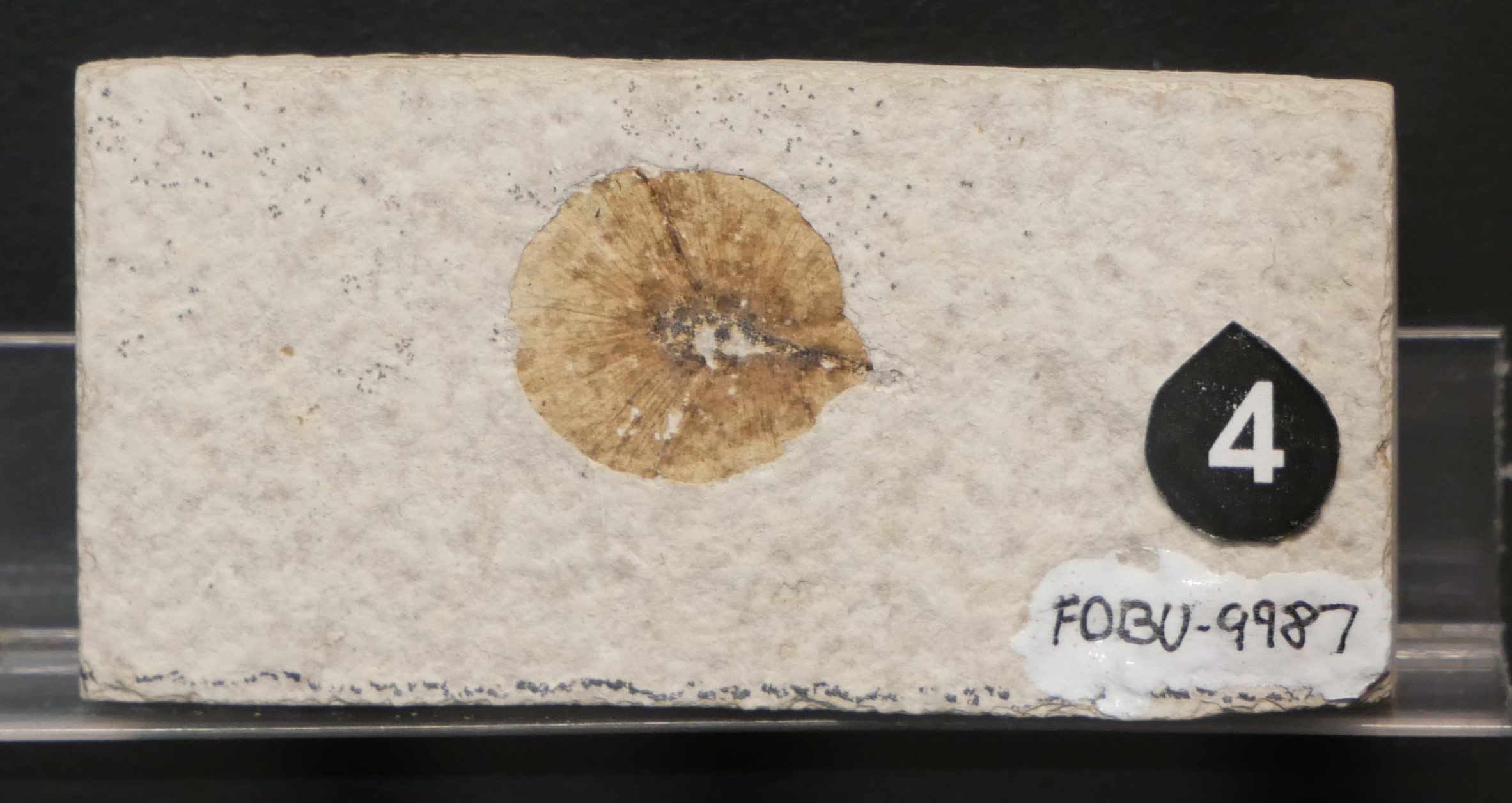
Fossil Dipteronia sp. seed from Fossil Butte National Monument

The extinct species Dipteronia brownii is known from Middle Paleocene to Early Oligocene sites across western North America. The oldest fossils are found in the Fort Union Formation of Wyoming and the Tsagayan Formation of Northeastern coastal Russia. In the Early Eocene the species expanded northward to the Eocene Okanagan Highlands sites such as the Klondike Mountain Formation of Washington, Driftwood Shales and Tranquille Formation of British Columbia as well as into the John Day Formation of central Oregon. During the middle to late Eocene the species spread east and south to the Ruby Basin Flora of Montana and the Florissant Formation of Colorado, while the last occurrences are in the Early Oligocene, Rupelian of the Bridge Creek Flora in the upper John Day Formation. Concurrently, several Dipteronia brownii fruits have also been collected from Rupelian 32 ± 1 million years ago lacustrine mudstones in Chuxiong Yi Autonomous Prefecture southwestern China.
