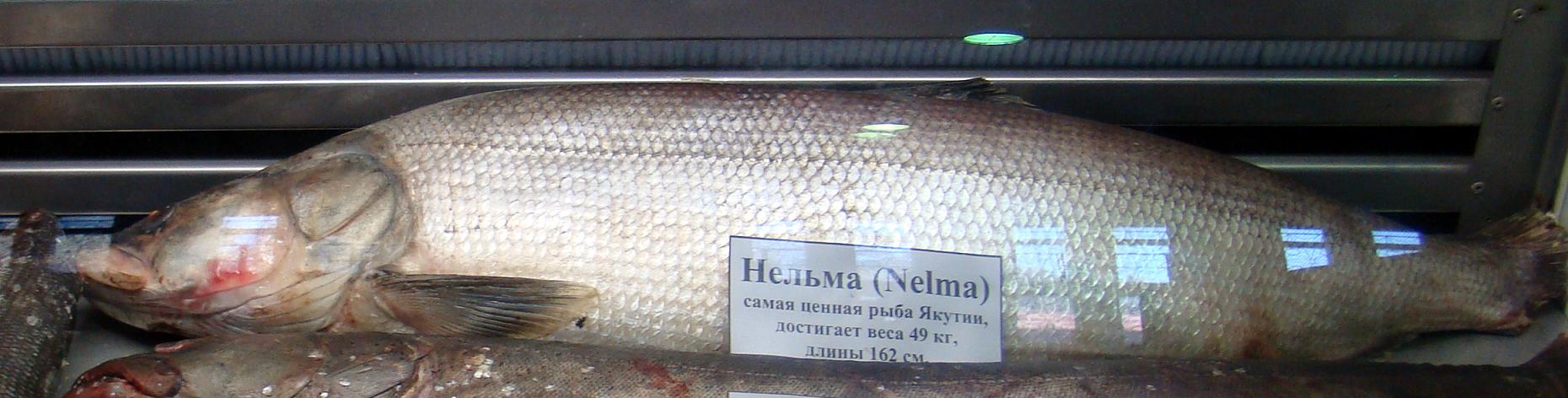

Conservation status
- Least Concern (IUCN 3.1)

Scientific classification
- Kingdom: Animalia
- Phylum: Chordata
- Class: Actinopterygii
- Division: Teleostei
- Order: Salmoniformes
- Family: Salmonidae
- Genus: Stenodus
- Species: S. nelma

Binomial name
- Stenodus nelma (Pallas, 1773)

Synonyms
- Salmo nelma Pallas, 1773; Stenodus leucichthys nelma (Pallas, 1773); Salmo mackenzii Richardson, 1823; Stenodus leucichthys mackenzii (Richardson, 1823); Stenodus mackenzii (Richardson, 1823); Leucichthys nelma (Pallas, 1773)

= Nelma =

Stenodus nelma

Species of fish

Stenodus nelma, known alternatively as the nelma, sheefish, siifish, inconnu or connie, is a commercial species of freshwater whitefish in the family Salmonidae. It is widespread in the Arctic rivers from the Kola Peninsula (White Sea basin) eastward across Siberia to the Anadyr River and also in the North American basins of the Yukon River and Mackenzie River.

== Appearance and lifestyle ==
Stenodus nelma is an anadromous fish, up to 150 centimetres (59 in) in length. The fish has a large mouth with a protruding lower jaw and a high and pointed dorsal fin. It is generally silver in color with a green, blue or brown back. The meat is white, flaky and somewhat oily. An adult fish weighs up to 27 kilograms (60 lb).

The fish eat plankton for their first year of life and then become predators of smaller fish. They live in lakes and rivers and in the brackish water at the outlets of rivers into the ocean. They may migrate more than 1,600 kilometres (1,000 mi) to their upriver spawning grounds, but some populations spend their entire life in fresh water and do not migrate.

== Systematics ==
Stenodus nelma has previously been considered a subspecies of Stenodus leucichthys (S. leucichthys nelma). The typical Stenodus leucichthys (beloribitsa) is a landlocked Eurasian species restricted to the Caspian Sea basin, and now extinct in the wild.

== Relationship with people ==
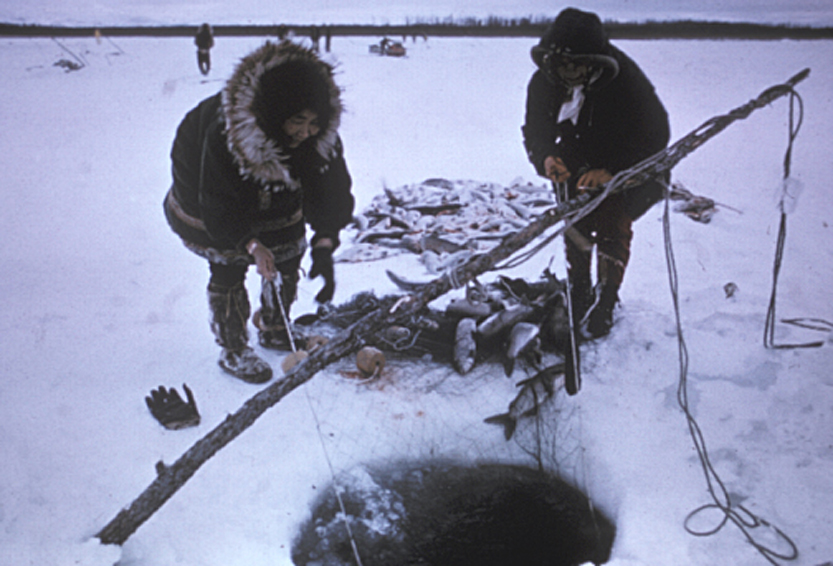
Iñupiat fishing for sheefish at Selawik National Wildlife Refuge, Alaska

Stenodus nelma is a historically important subsistence food for Native Alaskans in the Yukon and Mackenzie River basins.

It is prized by sport fishers who sometimes refer to it as "Tarpon of the Tundra" due to its leaping and fighting abilities matching that of the tropical Tarpon.
