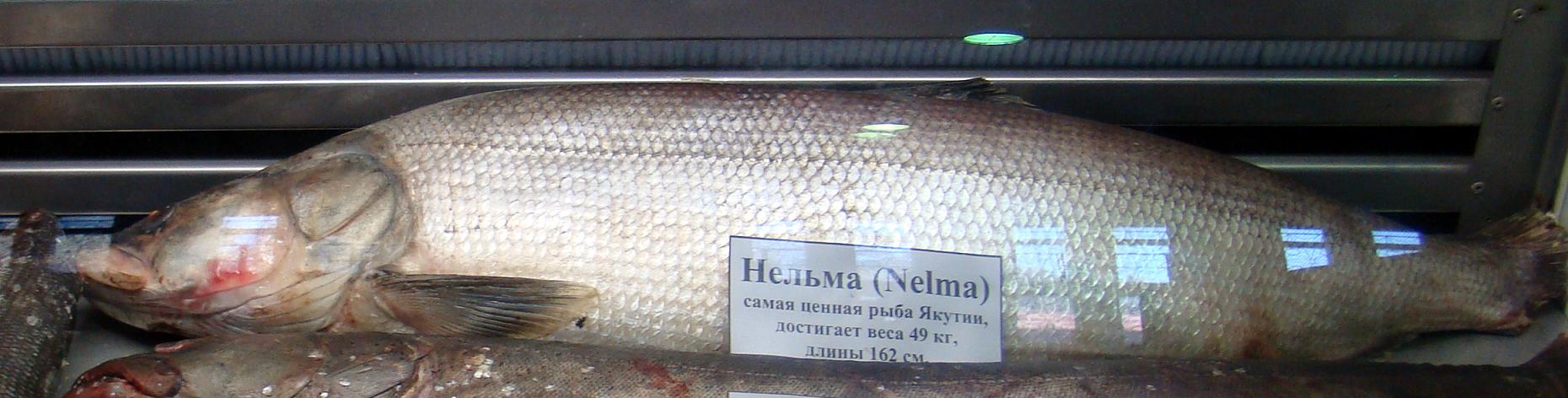
- Nelma (Stenodus nelma)

Scientific classification
- Kingdom: Animalia
- Phylum: Chordata
- Class: Actinopterygii
- Order: Salmoniformes
- Family: Salmonidae
- Subfamily: Coregoninae
- Genus: Stenodus; J. Richardson, 1836

Type species
- Coregonus leucichthys Güldenstädt, 1772

Synonyms
- Luciotrutta Günther, 1866

= Stenodus =

Genus of fishes

Stenodus is a genus of large-sized whitefish in the family Salmonidae. It consists of two species; one of them (beloribitsa) is extinct in the wild. The two species have alternatively been considered subspecies of the single species Stenodus leucichthys.

== Species ==
- Stenodus leucichthys — beloribitsa: the Caspian Sea basin
- Stenodus nelma — nelma, sheefish or inconnu: rivers of the Arctic basin.

== Systematics ==
The genus Stenodus is distinctive from other whitefishes due to its size and specialized predator morphology; however, evidence of independence from the broader freshwater whitefish genus Coregonus is not clearly evident.

== Sources ==
- Froese, Rainer; Pauly, Daniel (eds.). "Species in genus Stenodus". FishBase. February 2013 version.
