= Driftwood Canyon Provincial Park =

Provincial park in the Regional District of Bulkley-Nechako, British Columbia

- IUCN category II (national park)
- Location within British Columbia
- Interactive map of Driftwood Canyon Provincial Park
- Location: Range 5 Coast Land District, British Columbia, Canada
- Nearest city: Smithers, BC
- Coordinates: 54°49′34″N 127°01′19″W
- Area: 23 ha (57 acres)
- Established: January 4, 1967
- Governing body: BC Parks

Driftwood Canyon Provincial Park is a provincial park in British Columbia, Canada. Driftwood Canyon Provincial Park covers 23 hectares (57 acres) of the Bulkley River Valley, on the east side of Driftwood Creek, a tributary of the Bulkley River, 10 km northeast of the town of Smithers. The park is accessible from Driftwood Road from Provincial Highway 16. It was created in 1967 by the donation of the land by the late Gordon Harvey (1913–1976) to protect fossil beds on the east side of Driftwood Creek. The beds were discovered around the beginning of the 20th century. The park lands are part of the asserted traditional territory of the Wet'suwet'en First Nation.

Driftwood Canyon Provincial Park protects internationally significant Eocene fossil beds. It is the northernmost site in North America with fossilized Eocene insects, and also contains fossils of ancestral salmon, trout, and suckers, including Eosalmo driftwoodensis. Ongoing paleontological research continues at the site, but fossil collection by the public is prohibited.

The Provincial Park also contains a high priority and under-represented ecosection in British Columbia (a remnant Bulkley Basin Ecosection), and an under-represented biogeoclimatic sub-zone consisting of dry, cool sub-boreal spruce.

== History ==
Paleontological and geological studies of similar deposits to Driftwood Canyon occurring to the east and further south in the interior of British Columbia go back to work carried out by George Mercer Dawson and John William Dawson in the 1870s to 1890s as part of the survey of British Columbia for the Geological Survey of Canada, and D.P. Penhallow's work on Cenozoic Era plants. Fossil fish from Driftwood Canyon in the Canadian Museum of Nature include specimens collected in the 1930s; however, the Driftwood Canyon (also known as Driftwood Creek beds) fossils have only been studied since the 1950s.

In 2010 the interpretive trail was redeveloped by BC Parks, in partnership with the Bulkley Valley Naturalists, and the Smithers Rotary Club and funded by the Canadian Federal Government, BC Parks, the Wetzin’kwa Community Forest, and the National Trails Coalition. A new bridge over Driftwood Creek was built, a new wheel-chair accessible trail constructed, and new signage put in place.

The new interpretive signs explain both the cultural heritage of the area, including Wet'suwet'en First Nation fishing and other cultural practices in the area, both traditional and present day, as well as the sub-boreal spruce forest of the area and the significance of the fossil resource. At the public fossil site at the trail terminus, signs describe some of the research findings of the site based on supplied testimony from paleontologists active at the site, and feature photos of some of the important fossils discovered there.

== Geology ==
A short interpretive trail leads visitors to a cliff-face exposure of Eocene shales that were deposited in an inter-montane lake. Interbedded within the shales are volcanic ash beds, the result of area volcanoes that were erupting throughout the life of the Eocene lake that produced the shales. Preserved within the shale formations are plant, animal and insect species that inhabited the area over 50 million years ago. Similar fossil beds in Eocene lake sediments are found at the McAbee Fossil Beds Heritage Site west of Kamloops in southern British Columbia. The Princeton Chert fossil beds in southern British Columbia are also Eocene, but primarily preserve an aquatic plant community.

== Paleontology ==
The Driftwood Canyon fossil beds are best known for the abundant and well-preserved insect and fish fossils (Amia, Amyzon, and Eosalmo). The insects are particularly diverse and well preserved, and include water striders (Gerridae), aphids (Aphididae), leaf hoppers (Cicadellidae), green lacewings (Neuroptera), spittle bugs (Cercopidae), march flies (Bibionidae), scorpionflies (Mecoptera), fungus gnats (Mycetophilidae), snout beetles (Curculionidae), and ichneumon wasps. A fossil species of green lacewing (Neuroptera, Chrysopidae) was in 2013 named Pseudochrysopa harveyi to honour the founder of the park, Gordon Harvey. Fossil feathers are sometimes found and rare rodent bones are sometimes found in fish coprolites. Most recently, fossil palm beetles (Bruchidae) were described from the beds, confirming the presence of palms (Arecaceae) in the local environment in the early Eocene.

Fossils of plant remains include up to 29 genera of plants. The most common plant fossils found are leafy shoots of the dawn redwood, Metasequoia, and the floating fern Azolla primaeva as mats of plants or as isolated fossils. Leaves of alder (Alnus sp.) are also found, as well as the leaves or needles and seeds of pines (Pinus sp.), the golden larch (Pseudolarix sp.), cedars (Chamaecyparis and/or Thuja spp.), redwood (Sequoia sp.), and rare Ginkgo and sassafras (Sassafras hesperia) leaves. A permineralized pine cone (Pinus driftwoodensis) and associated 2-needle foliage was described from the site in the 1980s. Rare flowers and the seeds of flowering plants have been collected, including Ulmus, Florissantia, and Dipteronia, a genus of trees related to maples (Acer. spp.) that today grows in eastern Asia. A fossil fern described from Driftwood Canyon is likely a Beech fern (Phegopteris connectilis group), a fern found in temperate climates across the Northern Hemisphere.

Initial attempts at radiometric dating of the Driftwood Creek beds were unsuccessful, however a volcanic ash exposed in the lake shale beds was radiometrically dated at 51.77 ± 0.34 million years ago.

Bird feathers are infrequently collected from the shales; however, 2 bird body fossils have been found. In 1968 a bird body fossil was collected by Pat Petley of Kamloops and donated in 2000 to the Thompson Rivers University (TRU) paleontology collections and is on display at Thompson Rivers University. A fossil bird complete with feathers collected from Driftwood Canyon Provincial Park in 1970 by German visitors Margret and Albrecht Klöckner, was repatriated to British Columbia and donated to the Royal British Columbia Museum/Victoria some 38 years later. Both bird fossils were described and identified in 2019 as a coliiform bird and a member of the Songziidae respectively.

In 2014 two fossil mammal jaws were reported from the Park, identifying an early tapir relative (cf. Heptodon) and hedgehog relative named Silvacola acares (which means small forest dweller), the first Eocene North American records of these animals outside of Ellesmere Island in the Canadian Arctic or Colorado and Wyoming.

Small collections of fossils are housed in the Bulkley Valley Museum in Smithers and by the BC Parks office in Smithers. Larger collections of fossils are in the Beaty Biodiversity Museum at UBC in Vancouver BC, the Royal BC Museum in Victoria BC, the Royal Ontario Museum (ROM), Canadian Museum of Nature (CMN), the Burke Museum of Natural History & Culture in Seattle WA, and university collections. Significant collections of fossils from Driftwood Canyon are in private ownership.

== Conservation ==
Limited personal fossil collecting was originally permitted in Driftwood Canyon Park, and the site is listed in several tourism and rock collection guides as a place to visit for this activity. However, in the past 5 or so years following recommendations to cease unrestricted public and commercial collection of fossils, BC Parks has ended fossil collecting by members of the public due to:

1. concerns over visitor safety as falling rocks from the shale cliff face may endanger visitors collecting fossils;
2. the loss of the palaeontological resource (also, fossil removal contravenes the Park Act);
3. as well as concerns that soil and rocks dislodged during fossil collecting will contribute to sediment in Driftwood Creek, potentially impacting downstream fish spawning habitat.

=== Management ===
The cessation of fossil collecting at Driftwood Canyon Provincial Park is consistent with British Columbia's new Fossil Management Framework which seeks to:

- clarify the rules governing the management and use of fossils;
- manage impacts on fossils from other activities;
- provide for the stewardship of significant fossil sites;
- raise internal and external awareness of the framework and the importance of fossils;
- build knowledge of the nature and extent of the resource in BC; and
- clarify the rights and obligations of the public, business, government and other stakeholders.

=== Access ===
A car park just off the road access leads to an interpretive sign and a bridge across Driftwood Creek.

== Gallery ==
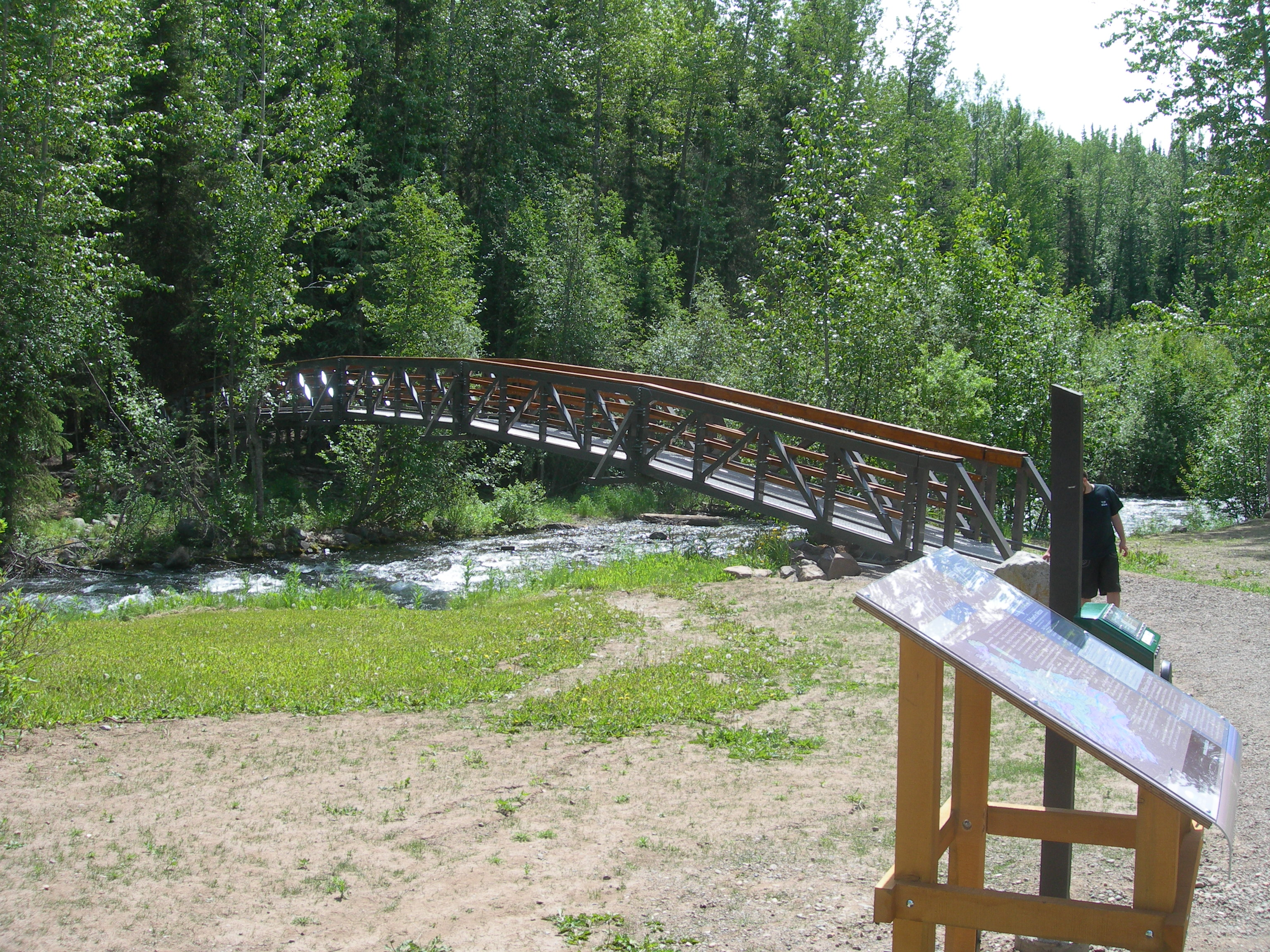
Bridge over Driftwood Creek at the start of the interpretive trail.

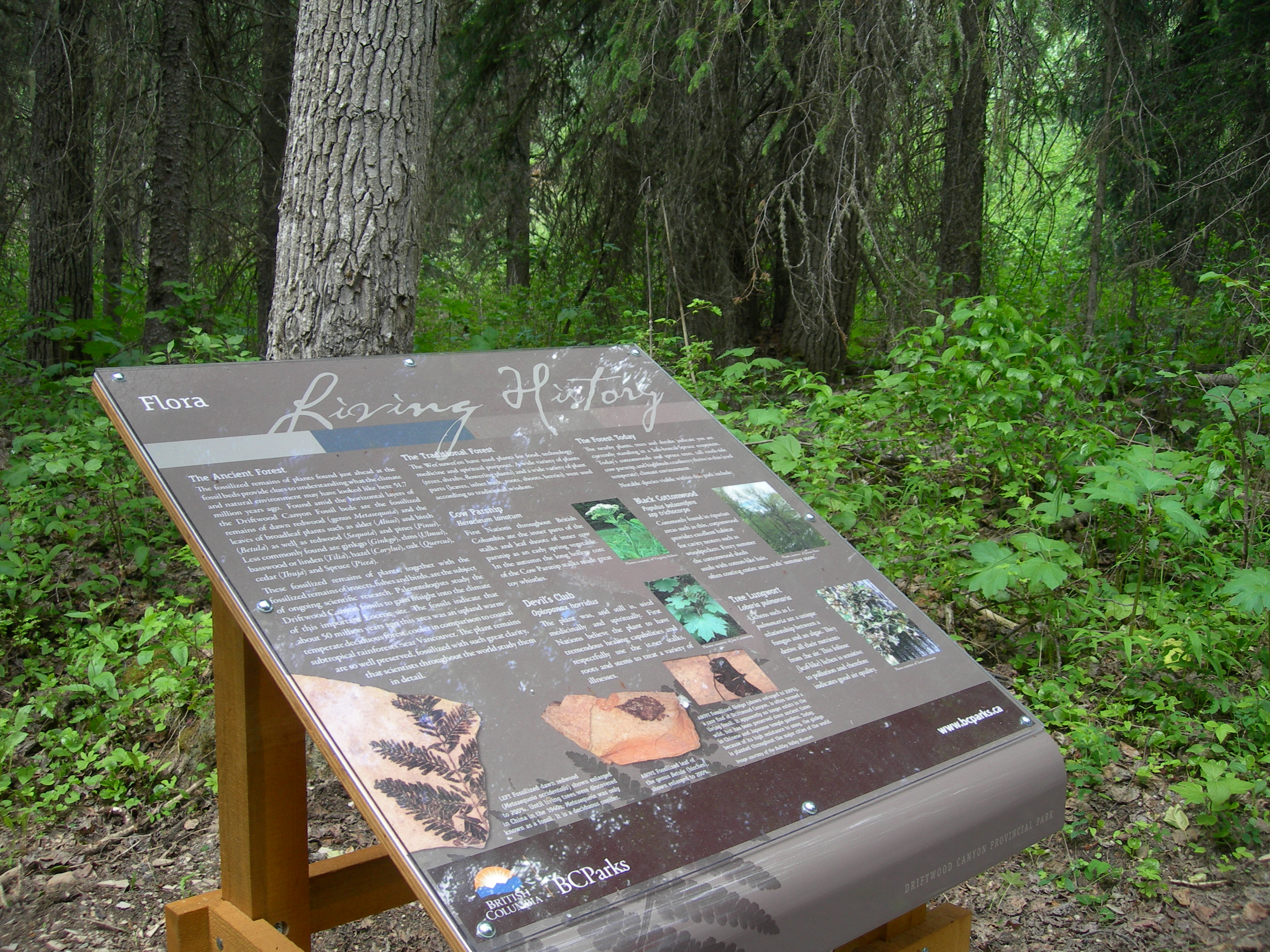
Interpretive sign on Driftwood Canyon trail.

== See also ==
- List of fossil sites
- List of fossil parks
- Tyhee Lake Provincial Park
