= Sivulliusalmo =

Sivulliusalmo Temporal range: Late Cretaceous, Campanian

Scientific classification
- Kingdom: Animalia
- Phylum: Chordata
- Class: Actinopterygii
- Order: Salmoniformes
- Family: Salmonidae
- Genus: †Sivulliusalmo; Murray, Brinkman, et al., 2025

Type species
- Sivulliusalmo alaskensis Murray, Brinkman, et al., 2025

Extinct genus of salmonid fish

Sivulliusalmo is an extinct genus of salmonid fish from the Late Cretaceous (Campanian) of North America. It contains a single species, Sivulliusalmo alaskensis. Described in 2025, it is recognized as the oldest and most basal member of the salmonid family.

== Taxonomy and discovery ==
The genus is known from fossils recovered from the Campanian-age deposits of the Prince Creek formation in Alaska. The description of the genus and species by Murray, Brinkman, and colleagues in 2025 established its position as the stem-most salmonid.

== Significance ==
Sivulliusalmo provides crucial insight into the early evolution of salmonids. Its anatomical features help to clarify the group's initial diversification and its presence in Campanian deposits of Alaska pushes back the confirmed fossil record of the family Salmonidae.
