= Tyhee Lake Provincial Park =

Provincial park in the Regional District of Bulkley-Nechako, British Columbia

- IUCN category II (national park)
- Location within British Columbia
- Interactive map of Tyhee Lake Provincial Park
- Location: British Columbia, Canada
- Nearest city: Smithers
- Coordinates: 54°42′26″N 127°02′18″W
- Area: 0.39 km^{2} (0.15 sq mi)
- Established: April 11, 1955
- Governing body: BC Parks

Tyhee Lake Provincial Park is a provincial park in British Columbia, Canada, located near the town of Smithers in the Bulkley Valley.

== History ==
On Trutch's 1871 map, it was labelled "McLean's Lake", but "Aldermere Lake" elsewhere. Aldermere was on the hill above Telkwa. The lake became known as "Tyee Lake", from the Chinook word, originally pronounced Die-yeeh, meaning "chief". The traditional name of the lake is Too-Kyoh-buhn, pronounced toh-kyoh-bun, meaning Big Water Lake. The lake was Station 11 on the Collins Overland Telegraph. Renamed "Maclure Lake" after a telegraph surveyor, this name was used as late as 1978. Since locals continued calling it Tyee, the name was officially changed to Tyhee, because Tyee had been assigned to a lake in the Cariboo.

Established on 11 April 1955, the 33-hectare Maclure Lake Park was renamed Tyhee Lake Park on 10 September 1981. On 19 May 2010, the area increased to approximately 39 hectares.
