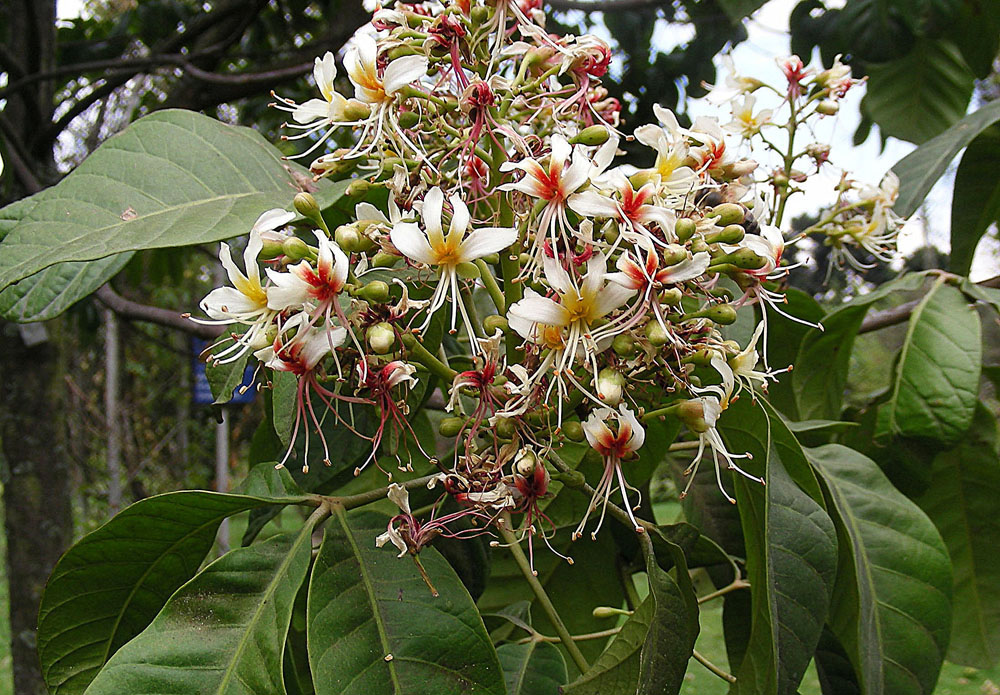
- Billia rosea

Scientific classification
- Kingdom: Plantae
- Clade: Tracheophytes
- Clade: Angiosperms
- Clade: Eudicots
- Clade: Rosids
- Order: Sapindales
- Family: Sapindaceae
- Subfamily: Hippocastanoideae
- Genus: Billia; Peyr.

Species
- Billia hippocastanum Billia rosea

= Billia =

Genus of flowering plants

Billia is a genus of trees in the family Sapindaceae and native to the Americas, from central Mexico to Ecuador. The wood is used in carpentry.

== Species ==
The following species are recognized:

- Billia hippocastanum
- Billia rosea
