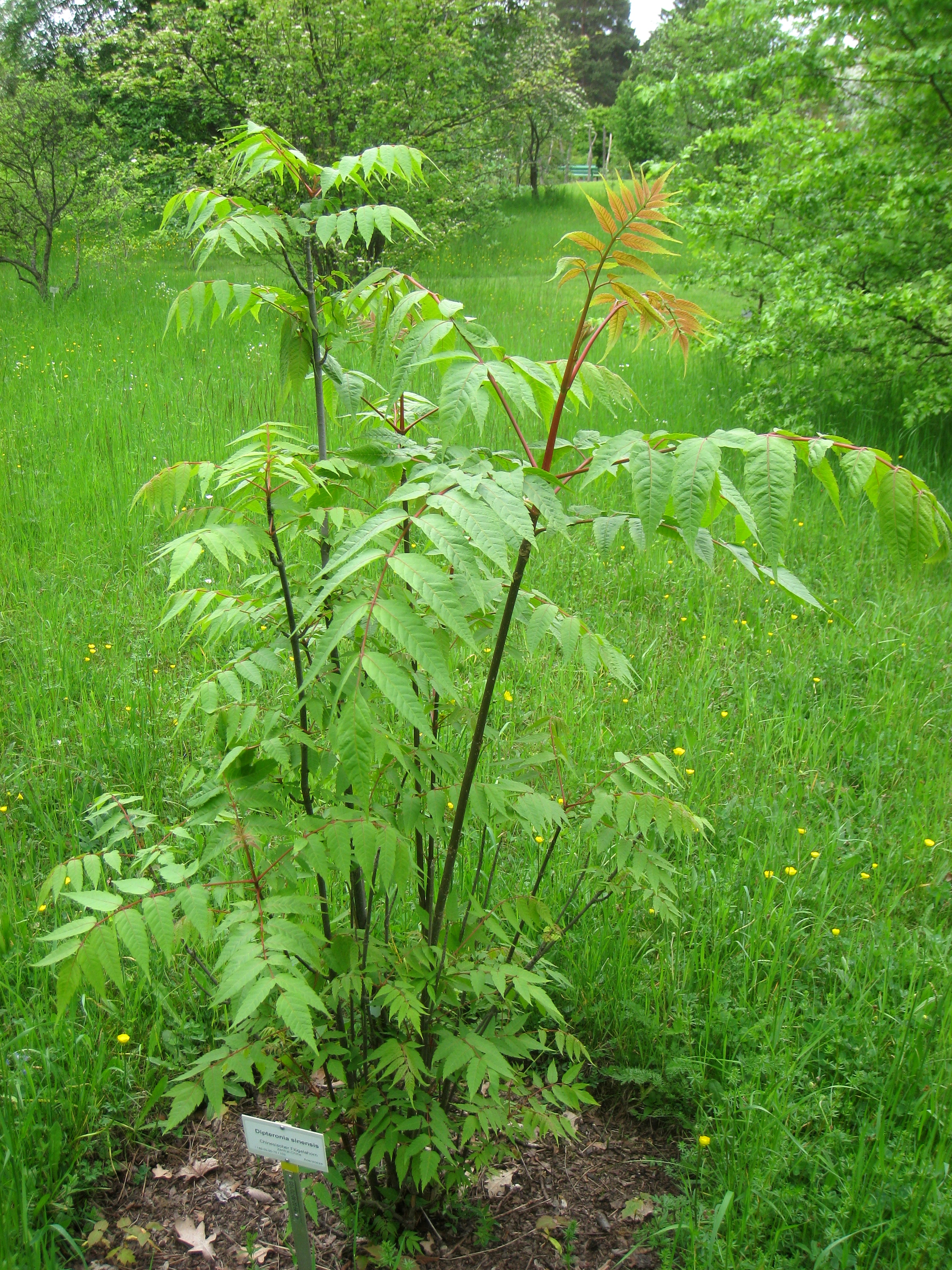

Conservation status
- Data Deficient (IUCN 3.1)

Scientific classification
- Kingdom: Plantae
- Clade: Tracheophytes
- Clade: Angiosperms
- Clade: Eudicots
- Clade: Rosids
- Order: Sapindales
- Family: Sapindaceae
- Genus: Dipteronia
- Species: D. sinensis

Binomial name
- Dipteronia sinensis Oliv.

= Dipteronia sinensis =

Species of flowering plant

Dipteronia sinensis is a plant species in the genus Dipteronia, endemic to mainland China, and regarded in the soapberry family Sapindaceae sensu lato after Angiosperm Phylogeny Group (APG I 1998, APG II 2003) and more recently (Harrington et al. 2005)), or traditionally by several authors in Aceraceae, related to the maples.

Dipteronia sinensis is a deciduous flowering shrub or small tree, reaching 10–15 m tall. The leaf arrangement is opposite and pinnate. The inflorescences are paniculate, terminal or axillary. The flowers have five sepals and petals; staminate flowers have eight stamens, and bisexual flowers have a two-celled ovary. The fruit is a rounded samara containing two compressed nutlets, flat, encircled by a broad wing which turns from light green to red with ripening.
