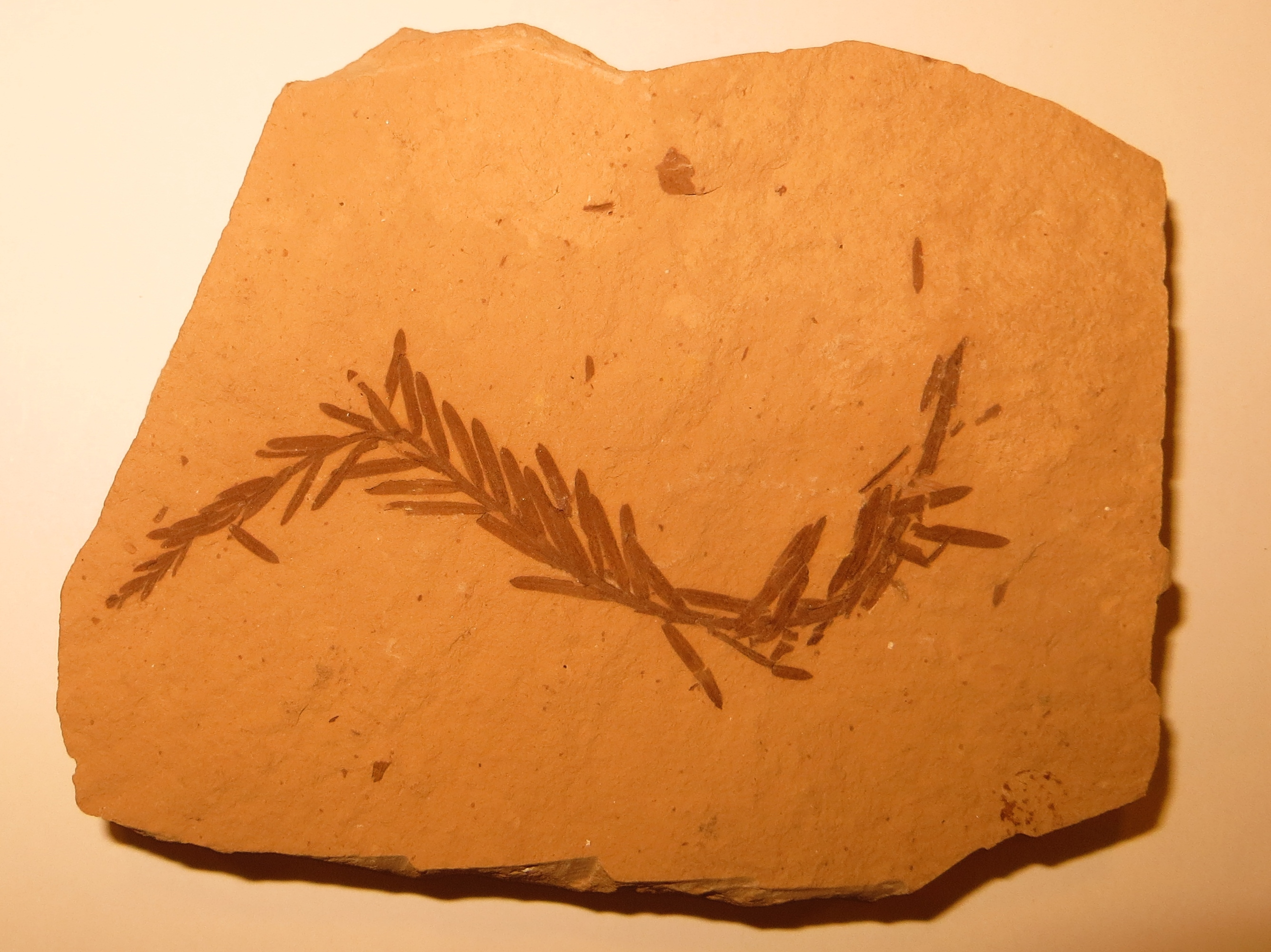
- Metasequoia heerii foliage; early Oligocene, John Day Basin, Painted Hills, Oregon

Scientific classification
- Kingdom: Plantae
- Clade: Tracheophytes
- Clade: Gymnospermae
- Division: Pinophyta
- Class: Pinopsida
- Order: Cupressales
- Family: Cupressaceae
- Genus: Metasequoia
- Species: †M. heerii

Binomial name
- †Metasequoia heerii (Hu) Cheng, 1948

= Metasequoia heerii =

Metasequoia heerii Temporal range: Late Cretaceous–Tertiary

Extinct species of conifer

Metasequoia heerii is an extinct redwood species of the family Cupressaceae that is found as fossils throughout the Northern Hemisphere. It is one of several proposed extinct species of Metasequoia that were previously referred to Sequoia.

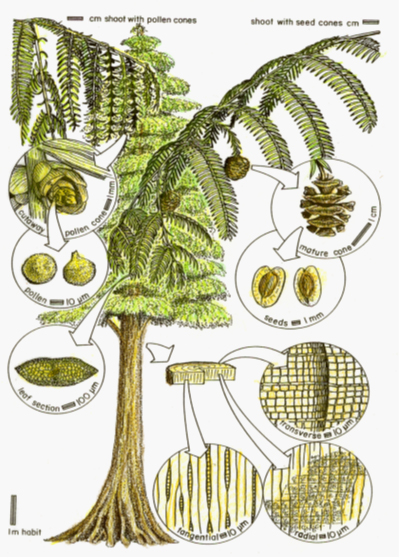
Metasequoia heerii reconstruction illustration; illustration by G. Retallack

== History ==
Many fossilized Metasequoia-like remains were noted in Europe and North America as long ago as the 1800s but were assigned to a variety of other genera such as Sequoia (redwoods) and Taxodium (bald cypresses). It wasn't until 1942 when living Metasequoia trees (Metasequoia glyptostroboides) were discovered and documented in a remote area of China. Once discovered it allowed for many Sequoia to be reviewed.

The species M. heerii was initially discovered in Sage Creek, Montana in 1872 by a French paleobotanist named Leo Lesquereux. Based on features of the specimens he collected he had established it as Sequoia heerii a new species. In 1948, when the announcement of the living Metasequoia trees was discovered in China, paleobotanist Wan-Chun Cheng and Hsen-Hsu Hu proposed several new fossil combinations involving species previously referred to Sequoia, including Seqouia heerii that was later changed to Metasequoia heerii.

== Description ==
Like living Metasequoia and similar to M. occidentalis, M. heerii was deciduous. The foliage consists of branchlets with oppositely arranged leaves. The leaves are ovate to linear in shape, ranging from 6–25 mm in length and .8–1 mm in width, with a petiolate base, a distinct mid-vein, and an acute to obtuse tip. The mature seed-bearing cones are small and near globose to ovoid in shape, 15–30 mm long and 10–20 mm wide, with decussately arranged triangular scales. The seeds have two wings, are ovoid to cordate in shape, and are up 4–5 mm long and 3 mm wide. The pollen-bearing cones are small, globose to ovoid, 1–4 mm long and 0.5–4 mm wide.

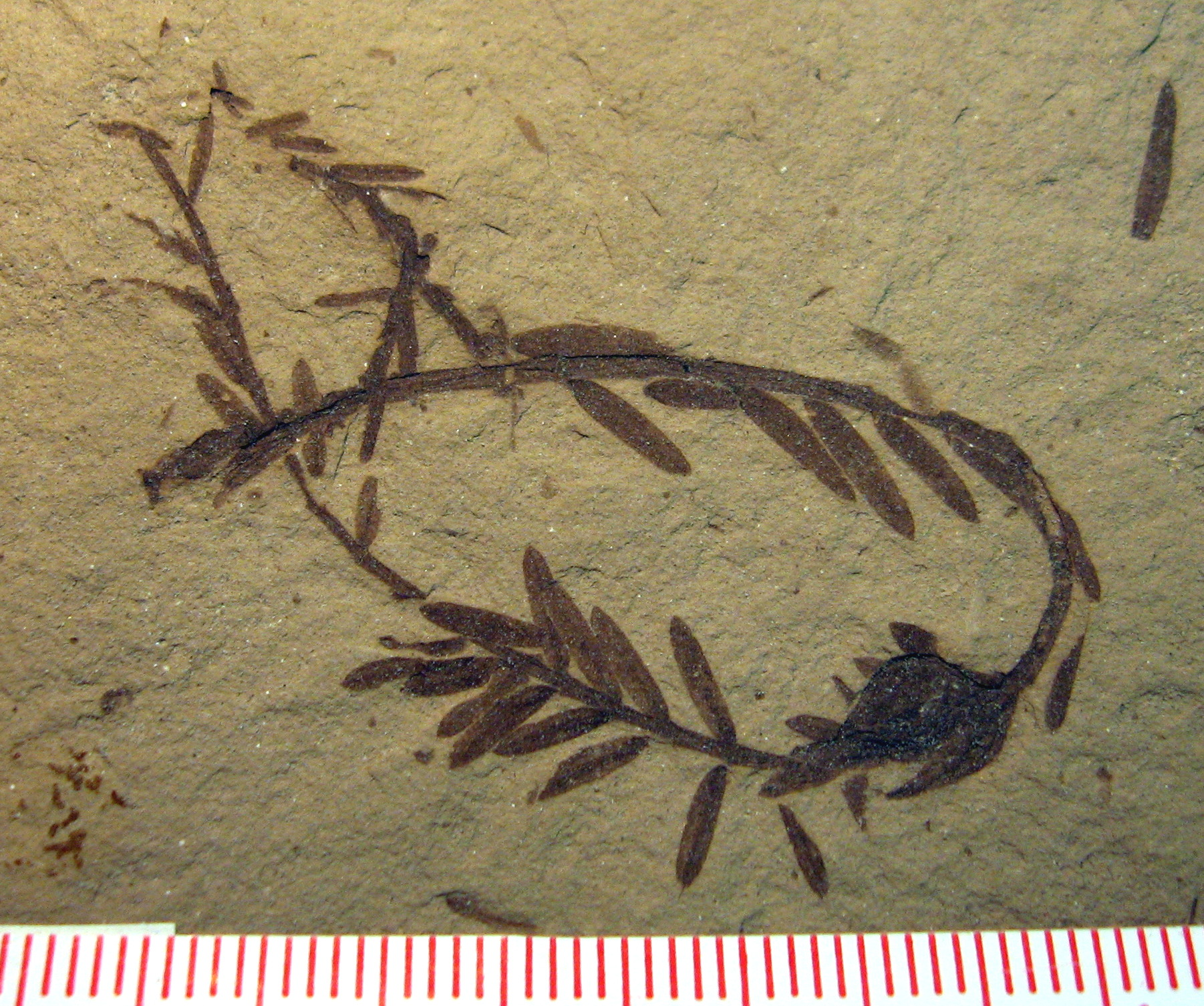
Metasequoia heeri fossil from Big Basin Member of the John Day Formation in the Painted Hills in Oregon

== Age and Distribution ==
Metasequoia heerii first appeared in the fossil record during the Late Cretaceous epoch and by the Miocene Metasequoia heerii had gone extinct. During the Tertiary period Metasequoia heerii had become a constituent of cool temperate lowland and swampy forests in the northern Pacific and polar regions. Fossils assignable to M. heerii have been reported in Western North America and China. Metasequoia appears to have been rare in much of Europe.
