= Metasequoia foxii =

Metasequoia foxii Temporal range: late Tiffanian Paleocene

Scientific classification
- Kingdom: Plantae
- Clade: Tracheophytes
- Clade: Gymnosperms
- Division: Pinophyta
- Class: Pinopsida
- Order: Cupressales
- Family: Cupressaceae
- Genus: Metasequoia
- Species: †M. foxii

Binomial name
- †Metasequoia foxii Stockey, Rothwell, & Falder, 2001

Extinct species of conifer

Metasequoia foxii is an extinct redwood species in the family Cupressaceae described from numerous fossils of varying growth stage. The species is solely known from the Paleocene sediments exposed in central Alberta, Canada. It is one of three extinct species belonging to the redwood genus Metasequoia.

== History and classification ==
The species is known from a very large number of attached and isolated plant sections ranging from new seedlings to a large upright partial stump, collected from two outcrops of the Paskapoo Formation exposed east of Red Deer in central Alberta. The formation is composed of medium-grain buff to light gray sandstones interbedded with finer sandstones and mudstones lying at an almost flat level. The outcrop at the Munce’s Hill location, also known as One Jaw Gap, is heavily fractured which resulted in difficulty removing the fossils for study. A number of the larger specimens were photographed prior to removal from the outcrop face to aid in study. Present at the Munce’s Hill location was one large upright stump which Stockey, Rothwell and Falder interpreted as being preserved in situ. The fossils of the formation are preserved as coalified compressions which have been oxidized.

Metasequoia foxii was described from a selection of 10,147 fossils. The group is composed of 3263 seeds, 1850 seedlings in various stages of development, the in situ trunk, 2536 branches and branchlets, 123 branchlets with pollen cones, and 2373 ovulate cones. The holotype specimen, number "UAPC-ALTA S28,476" is an isolated ovulate cone on a long stem. All the specimens studied are currently preserved in the paleobotanical collections housed at the University of Alberta. The specimens were studied by paleobotanists Ruth A. Stockey of the University of Alberta in Edmonton, Alberta, Canada with Gar W. Rothwell and Amy B. Falder of the Ohio University in Athens, Ohio, USA. Stockey, Rothwell, and Falder published their 2001 type description for M. foxii in the International Journal of Plant Sciences. The etymology of the chosen specific name foxii is in recognition of vertebrate paleontologist Richard C. Fox from the University of Alberta, who suggested several fossil localities to the authors for study including the Munce’s Hill 52°18′24″N 113°37′47″W and Gao mine sites.

M. foxii is one of three currently recognized extinct species in the genus Metasequoia, which is now represented by the single living species M. glyptostroboides. The species M. milleri is known only from the early Eocene Ypresian Allenby Formation near Princeton, British Columbia. Formerly up to 20 species of extinct Metasequoia were proposed, however the majority were synonymised into the form species M. occidentalis which is known from numerous sites in the northern hemisphere.

== Description ==
The cell structure of M. foxii is fairly well preserved in the large stump. Samples taken from the specimen show notably large rays up to 110 cells in height. The ray height for M. milleri is up to 80 cells and M. glyptostroboides has a ray of up to only 20 cells. As M. occidentalis is only known from compression fossils the ray size is unknown. While the overall height of M. foxii trees is not known, examination of the tracheid cells in conifers can be used to estimate the overall height of the tree. The diameter for tracheids in M. glyptostroboides is between 30–40 μm, while the diameter of tracheids in M. foxii is up to 55 μm. It is probable that M. foxii grew to be larger than the modern species which averages over 200 feet (61 m) in height. Unlike the other species of Metasequoia, the ovulate cones of M. foxii have five ranks of helically arranged cone scale complexes, which is in contrast to the normally decussately arranged group of four cone scale complexes of the other species. M. milleri can be distinguished from M. foxii by the structure of the mature pollen cones which in M. milleri have sporophylls that are separated by elongation of the bud scales and transition from a helical arrangement to a disorganized one with maturation.
