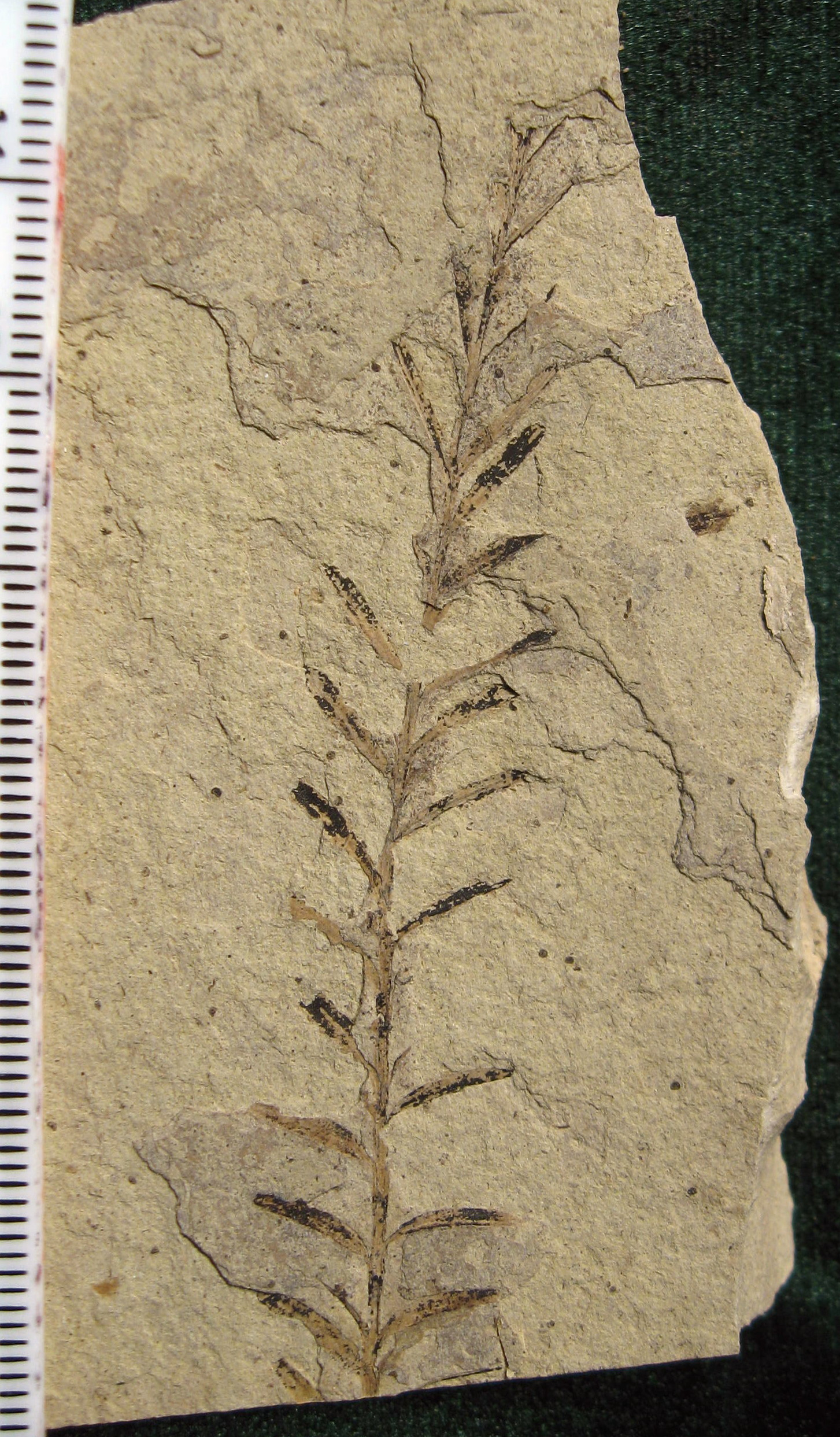
- A fossilized S. affinis branchlet, Eocene.

Scientific classification
- Kingdom: Plantae
- Clade: Embryophytes
- Clade: Tracheophytes
- Clade: Gymnosperms
- Division: Pinophyta
- Class: Pinopsida
- Order: Cupressales
- Family: Cupressaceae
- Genus: Sequoia
- Species: †S. affinis

Binomial name
- †Sequoia affinis Lesq.

= Sequoia affinis =

Extinct species of conifer

Sequoia affinis is an extinct species of conifer in the cypress family Cupressaceae.

The name Sequoia sometimes refers to the subfamily Sequoioideae, which includes the still-living Sequoia sempervirens along with Sequoiadendron (giant sequoia) and Metasequoia (dawn redwood). On its own, the term redwood usually refers to the coast redwood (Sequoia sempervirens), and not to species in the other genera.

There are many Sequoia fossils found at the Florissant fossil beds in Florissant, Colorado, including Sequoia affinis. A trio of Sequoia affinis fossilized stumps—believed to be three basal shoot clones of one original parent tree—has been reconstructed at this site.

Many branches of fossil Sequoia from Florissant have foliage with spreading leaves, which is also common in the modern Sequoia. The leaves in the fossil species, however, are usually thinner and more delicate. An example of the leaves of Sequoia affinis has been featured on a postcard in a series on "Tertiary Fossil Plants," issued by the British Museum of Natural History in the early 1920s. It has also been suggested that Sequoia affinis may be ancestral to both Sequoia sempervirens and Sequoiadendron giganteum (Sierra redwood).

Typically the female cones of Sequoia affinis are only 50-70% of the length of modern redwood cones. This information, paired with other differences in the wood, foliage, and pollen, show the distinction between Sequoia affinis and Sequoia sempervirens.

Fossilized Sequoia affinis pollen has been discovered in lake-sediment shale at the site in Florissant, Colorado.
