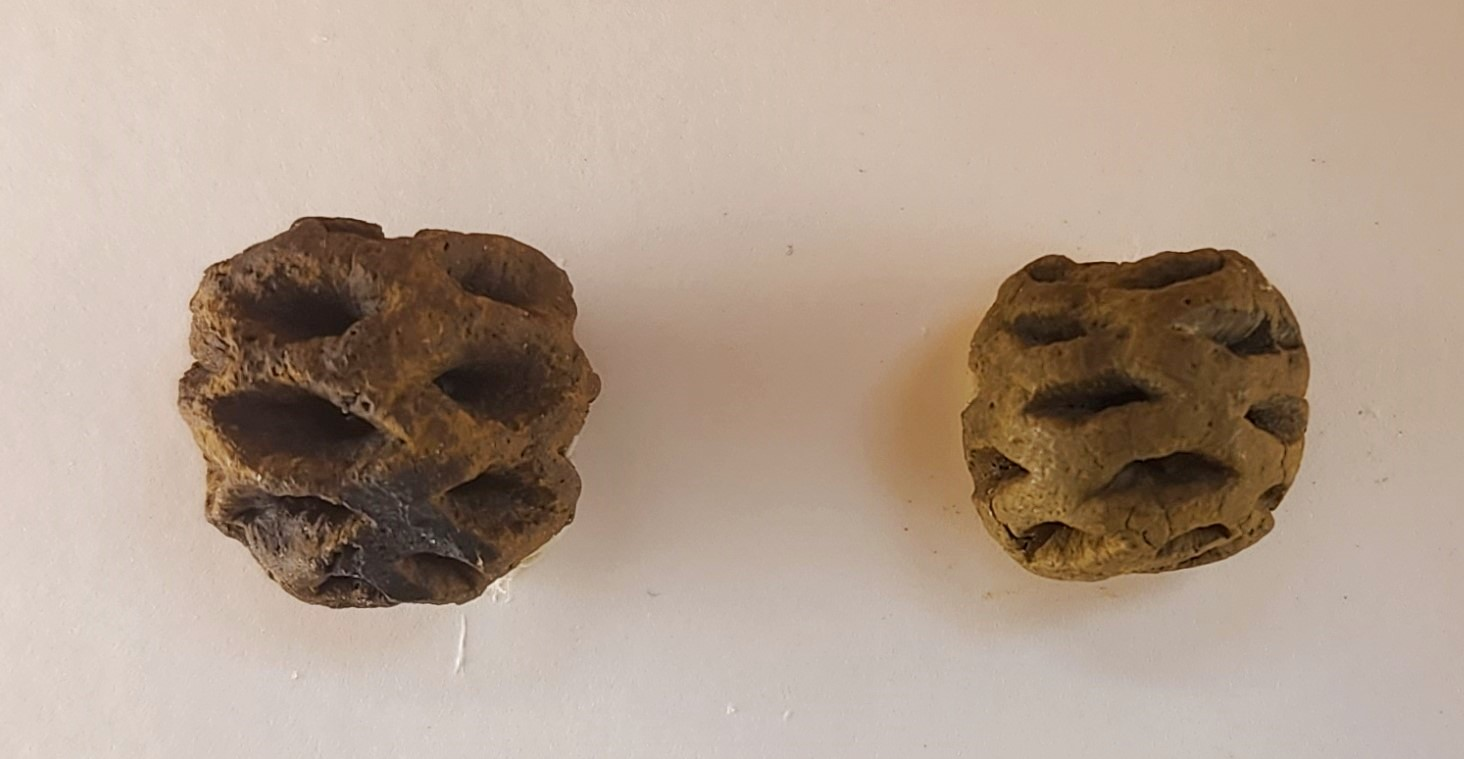
- Two Sequoites dakotensis cones

Scientific classification
- Kingdom: Plantae
- Clade: Tracheophytes
- Clade: Gymnosperms
- Division: Pinophyta
- Class: Pinopsida
- Order: Cupressales
- Family: Cupressaceae
- Genus: †Sequoites; Brongn.

Species
- †S. artus; †S. concinnus; †S. couttsiae; †S. dakotensis; †S. gardneri; †S. holstii; †S. langsdorfii; †S. polyanthes; †S. taxiformis; †S. woodwardii

= Sequoites =

Sequoites Temporal range: Aptian–Miocene

Genus of extinct redwood

Sequoites is an extinct genus of plant that existed from the Cretaceous until the Miocene across North America (Canada, Greenland and the United States) and Europe (Austria, Czechia, France, England, Germany and Sweden). Originally described as a coniferous tree in the genus Sequoia, it was later identified as a separate genus classified within Cupressaceae.

Ten species have been identified since the genus was named in 1849 by Adolphe-Théodore Brongniart.
