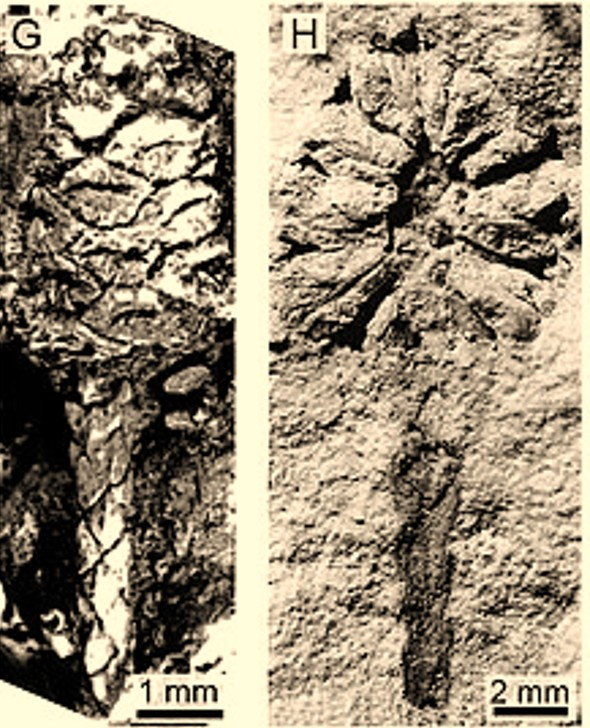

Scientific classification
- Kingdom: Plantae
- Clade: Tracheophytes
- Clade: Gymnospermae
- Division: Pinophyta
- Class: Pinopsida
- Order: Cupressales
- Family: Cupressaceae
- Subfamily: Sequoioideae
- Genus: †Austrosequoia; Peters & Christophel 1978

Type species
- Austrosequoia wintonensis

Species
- †Austrosequoia wintonensis; †Austrosequoia tasmanica; †Austrosequoia novae-zeelandiae

= Austrosequoia =

Austrosequoia Temporal range: 100–28.4 Ma Mid Cretaceous – Oligocene

Extinct genus of redwood trees

Austrosequoia was a genus of redwood that existed from the Cretaceous to Oligocene in what is now Australia and New Zealand. Fossils are known from the Winton Formation, the Little Rapid River in Tasmania and the Tupuangi Formation. While there have been doubts on its identity as a member of Sequoioideae, it does seem likely based on morphological similarity.

It is not the only evidence of Sequoioideae members in the Southern Hemisphere, as there is some evidence of a species of Sequoia (Sequoia chilensis) that once lived in the Miocene of Chile, though these specimens are questionable.

It is not known why Austrosequoia went extinct with the study that described the last species,A. tasmanica, stating that the decline of the conifers in Tasmania was clearly something rather complex which requires extensive study. Regardless, modern attempts in Oceania have managed to grow the extant Coastal Redwood (native to California) with remarkable success. A notable example of this is the Whakarewarewa forest in New Zealand.

== Morphology ==
Austrosequoia is known from cones and leaves. The ovulate cones are ellipsoidal with 29-49 scales. The cone axis is rather slender.
