= Metasequoia milleri =

Metasequoia milleri Temporal range: Early Eocene (Ypresian)51.3–49 Ma

Scientific classification
- Kingdom: Plantae
- Clade: Tracheophytes
- Clade: Gymnosperms
- Division: Pinophyta
- Class: Pinopsida
- Order: Cupressales
- Family: Cupressaceae
- Genus: Metasequoia
- Species: †M. milleri

Binomial name
- †Metasequoia milleri Rothwell & Basinger, 1979

Extinct species of conifer

Metasequoia milleri is an extinct redwood species in the family Cupressaceae described from numerous permineralized remains in the Princeton Chert of British Columbia, Canada. The species was initially described from isolated pollen cones, with further papers released on the leaves, ovulate cones, branches, and mycorrhizal root communities. The pollen cones are known from specimens attached to twigs, while the other organs are included in the species based on close fossil association only. The descriptive history of the species spans from 1977 to 2001 with five major papers. It is one of three extinct species belonging to the redwood genus Metasequoia.

== Distribution ==
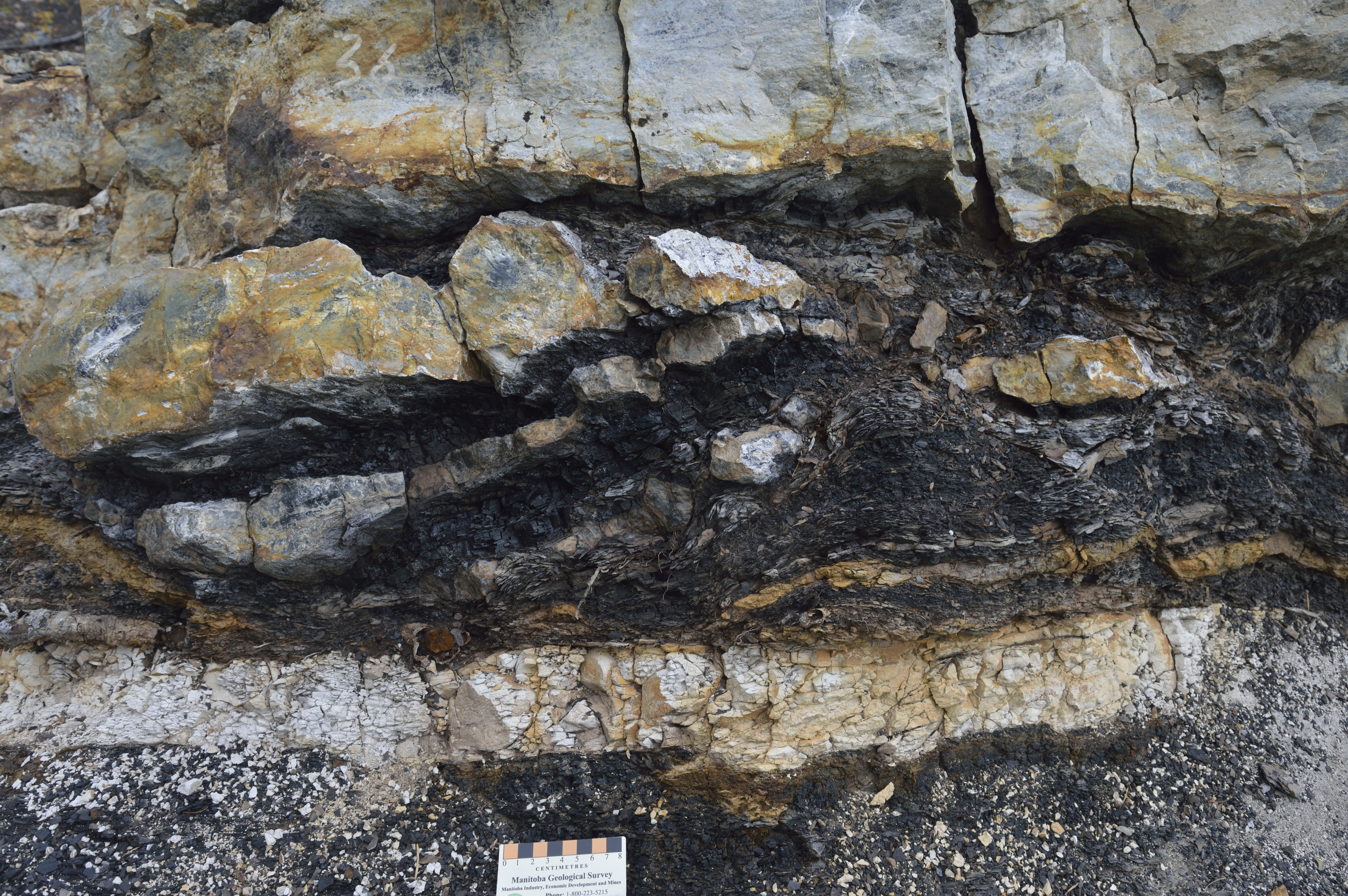
Close up of Princeton Chert outcrop showing volcanic ash (white layer at base), peaty coal (dark layer), and Chert layers (grey)

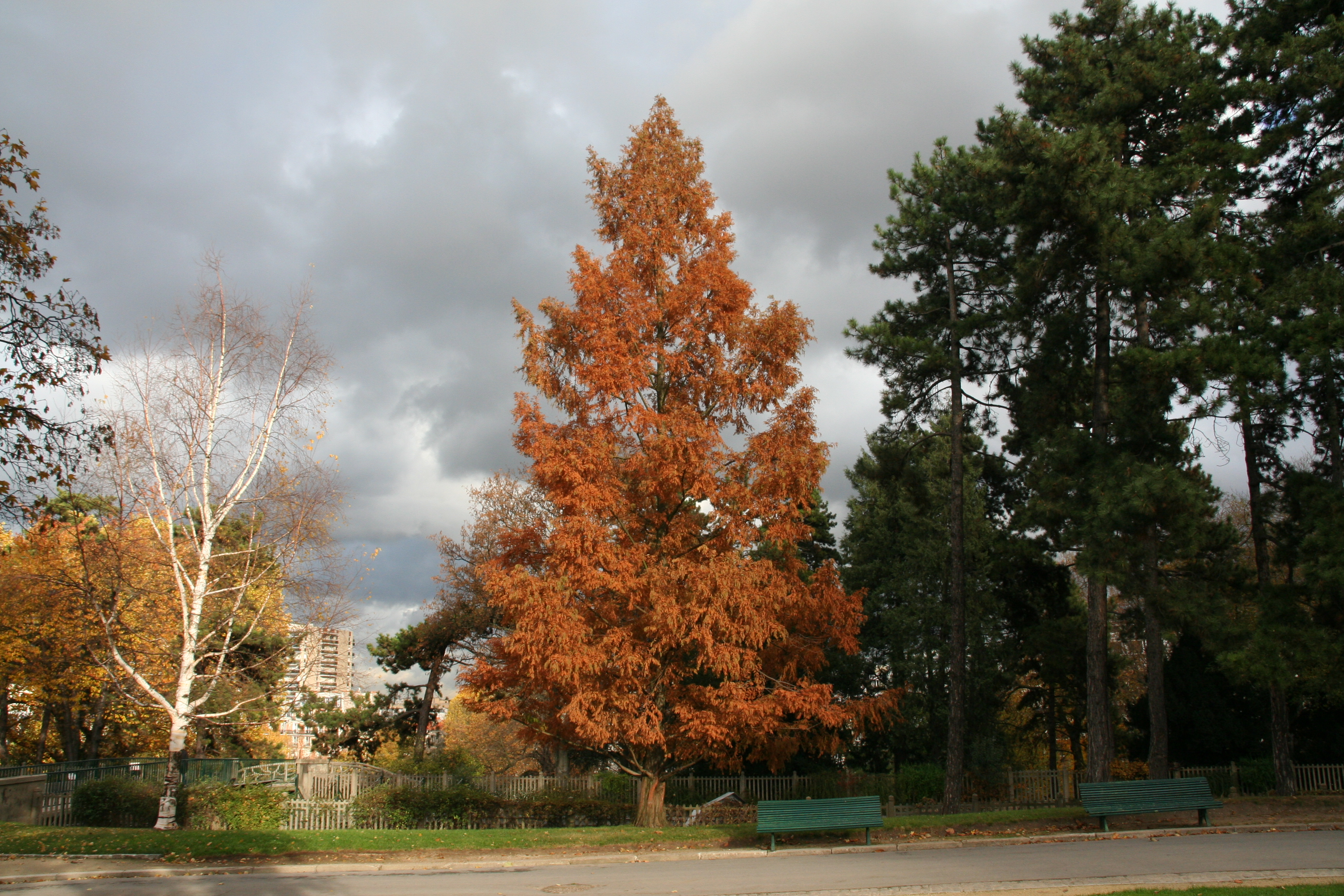
Fall foliage on Metasequoia glyptostroboides in Paris

Metasequoia milleri is known exclusively from the Princeton Chert, a fossil locality in British Columbia, Canada, which comprises an anatomically preserved flora of Eocene age, with rich species abundance and diversity. The chert is located in exposures of the Allenby Formation on the east bank of the Similkameen River, 8.5 km (5.3 mi) south of the town of Princeton, British Columbia.

Notable in conjunction with the coal seams of the Allenby Formation are sections of chert which formed during silica-rich periods. The rapid cyclical changes from coal to chert and back are not noted in any other fossil locality in the world. An estimated 49 coal-chert cycles are known, though the exact conditions for this process are not well understood. Silica-rich volcanic episodes in the region during deposition would have been needed for formation of the cherts, while slowly moving waters and gently subsiding terrains would be needed for the peats and fens to accumulate. Rates of organic deposition in swamps have been estimated at 0.5–1 mm (0.02–0.04 in) in modern temperate climates, this suggests the time needed for each 10–20 cm (4–8 in) chert layer would be at least 100 years or more, with the full sequence of cycles taking place over no more than 15,000 years.

The Allenby Formation is one of the southern-most in the Lagerstätten of the Eocene Okanagan Highlands, British Columbia, with the Canadian Penticton Group at the international border and the Klondike Mountain Formation of Republic, Washington, in northern Ferry County to the south. The highlands, including the Allenby Formation, have been described as one of the "Great Canadian Lagerstätten" based on the diversity, quality and unique nature of the biotas that are preserved. The Eocene Okanagan Highlands temperate-subtropical biome preserved across a large transect of lakes recorded many of the earliest appearances of modern genera, while also documenting the last stands of ancient lines.

== History and classification ==
In the early 1970s a series of papers were written noting the presence of permineralized plant fossils associated with the Allenby Formation south of Princeton, British Columbia. Paleobotanists Gar Rothwell and Jim Basinger reported the discovery of conifer pollen cones in the Princeton chert specimens via a 1977 paper in the Canadian Journal of Botany, identifying them as belonging to Metasequoia and Pinus. They noted the redwood pollen cones were often associated with woody axis, posited as from the same trees.

Over a year later Rothwell and Basinger published a full description of the redwood pollen cones based on a series of 52 specimens which had been isolated and examined from the chert blocks. Using a cellulose acetate peel modified with a hydrofloric acid component microscope slid mounts of the pollen cones were created, while sections of chert were subjected to maceration and the free pollen grains obtained mounted for study. The chert blocks and microscope slides created were accessioned into the University of Alberta palaeobotanical collections with block number "P1195D top" designated as containing the holotype cone. The blocks top surface exposes the pollen cone in oblique longitudinal view, and the slide series "5271-5289" provides a serial section though the cone. Three paratype bearing blocks were also designated in conjunction with slide series from each. Paratypes UAPC P1013B2 bot a, with slides 5110-5139 and P1013B2 bot 6 with slides SL5093-5109 plus SL5229-5254 both provide pollen cones presented in longitudinal serial section at different cut angles. The third paratype P1269A with slides SL5329-5344 presents a cone in cross section profile.

The formal description of the species from its pollen cones was published by Rothwell and Basinger (1979) in the Canadian Journal of Botany, with the species name milleri being chosen as a patronym honoring Charles N. Miller for his notable contributions to the understanding of confer evolution.

In 1981 Basinger published a follow-up paper in which the scope and botanical definitions of M. milleri were expanded beyond the original pollen cone description. Anatomic descriptions were given for both mature and immature woods associated with the described pollen cones. Additionally shoots and leaves were described in detail from associated unconnected fossils present in the chert blocks.

Three years later the species was again revisited by Basinger who documented associated seed cones from the chert. He noted that while the cones had not been found in full connection to other M. milleri organs, the consistent association of isolated parts and clear genus identity lead to placement in the same species. This outweighed what he ascribed as the usual caution which would be given to connecting plant organs not found in actual attachment under typical conditions.

Approximately 17 years later, a short paper was published by paleobotanist Ruth Stockey and coauthors documenting fungal association with the roots of M. milleri. Based on slide series from several rootlets they detailed the repeated presence of symbiotic arbuscular mycorrhiza in the fossils. The group extrapolates the possibility of a high degree of evolutionary stasis based on comparison to living M. glyptostroboides which shows very high similarity with the fossils.

== Description ==
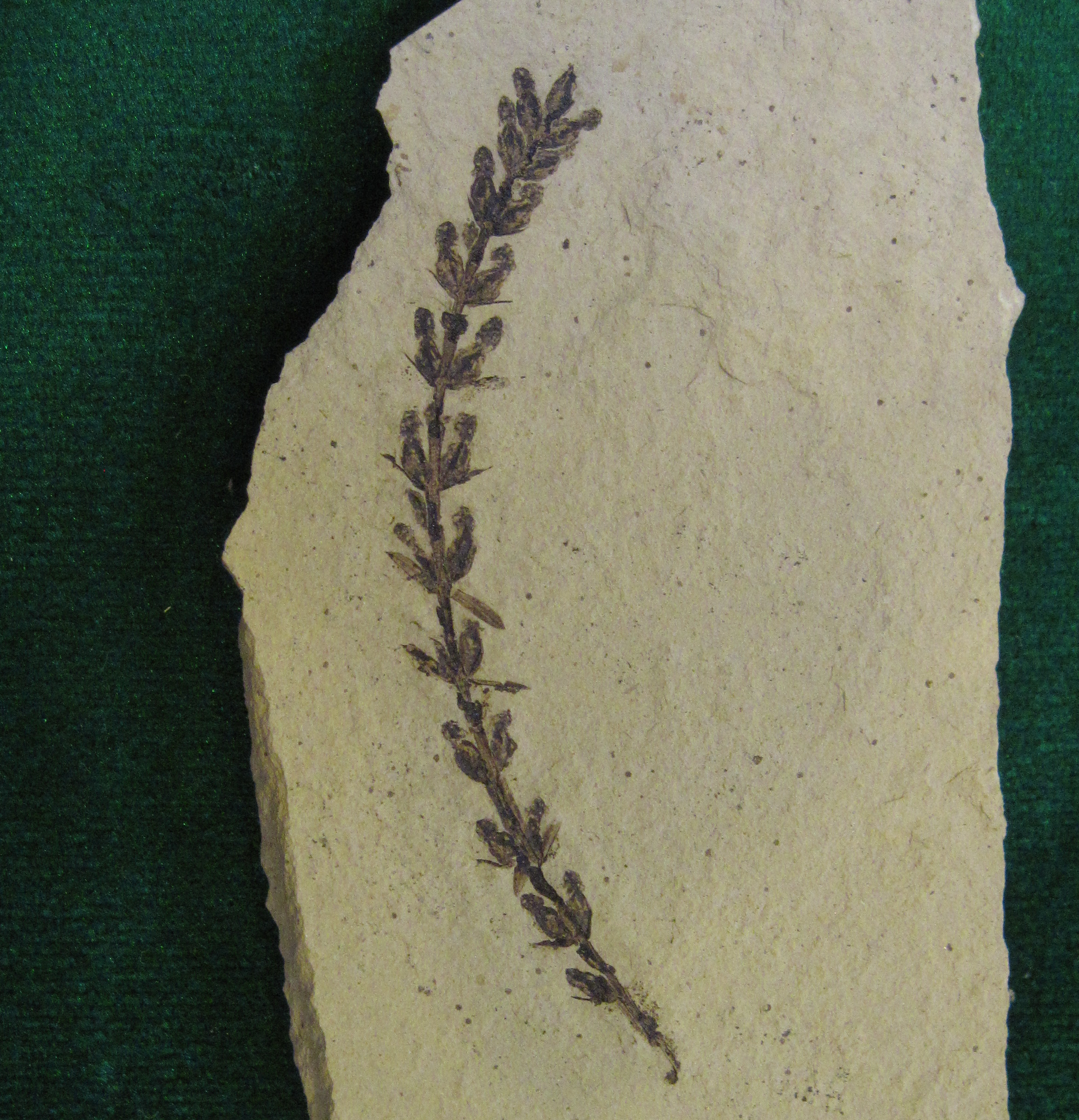
Metasequoia occidentalis male pollen cones on stem, Klondike Mountain Formation, Washington

The pollen cones range between 1.0–3.0 mm (0.039–0.118 in) long and between 1.2–2.9 mm (0.047–0.114 in) in diameter with each cone divided into a vegetative lower section and a reproductive terminal area. The vegetative section is between 0.9–2.5 mm (0.035–0.098 in) long with small scale like leaves at the base which gradually get larger and longer towards the center region of the cone, with the large upper leaves enclosing the sporophyll bearing section. The upper reproductive region involves approximately thirty sporophylls spirally born on the central axis each with three pollen sacs on the underside. Maturing and mature cones show a distinct elongation of the central axis over immature cones which are not close to reproductive maturity. Each of the sporophylls usually have a round basal attachment to the central axis which extends outward and then curves upwards towards the apex of the cone while flattening out into a spatula shape. The three sporangia are placed at the transition point between rounded base and flattened apical region, spouting on the underside of the structure. The mature sporangia are oblong and up to 0.8 mm (0.031 in) long and between 0.3–0.35 mm (0.012–0.014 in) wide.

A range of pollen development has been identified. With young immature pollen grains, the outer surface of each grain is a mostly smooth rounded sphere with little to no texturing. Grains closer to or at maturity have transitioned to being generally subspherical in outline, and have an outer surface that is papillate, coated with nob or nipple like projections. While the mature pollen are similar in size to modern M. glyptostroboides, the papillae are distinct, with an upright profile that has a flat to gently rounded top. M. glyptostroboides pollen has papillae which typically terminate in a bent to hooked tips.

The needles of M. milleri are narrower overall than living M. glyptostroboides with a smaller vascular diameter and overall smaller cross-sectional area. Conversely the needles are noted to be thicker overall, and have a larger resin canal diameter. The short shoots show an inflated stem base surrounded by small scale-like leaves that have no stomata. Needle-shapes foliage leaves are born further up the shoots at intervals averaging 1.5 mm (0.059 in) apart in pairs that then fan out from the shoot in a decussate manner. The leaves are between 0.7–1.5 mm (0.028–0.059 in) wide with a short petiole and a decurrent base which embraces the stem. Typically the needles are born in a flat plane to each side of the central stem. The needles have a central nerve bundle and one to two resin ducts.

The ovulate cones are born at the tip of a branchlet with very reduced to no scale leaves, the length of which is undetermined. The cone head is up to 25 mm (0.98 in) long with an ovoid to globular in outline. There are up to 30 cone scales arranged in decussate pairs on the central axis, the majority of scales are similar in size, but the apical and basal one to two pairs are smaller. Each scale is shield to peltate with a stalk attached to the underside which flairs out into an elliptical face. A horizontal groove crosses the front of the scale.

The rootlets of M. milleri show distinct symbiosis with fungal hyphae which have penetrated cortical cells of the roots. The hyphae show a paris type structuring, with the hyphae coiling within the root cells nearly filling each cell to capacity. The hyphae branch and spread between multiple cortical cells with the coils forking and sprouting tree like groupings of small hyphae called arbuscules. The arbuscules range between 20 and 70 µm in longest dimension and terminate in darkened swollen hyphae tips.

== Paleoecology and paleoenvironment ==
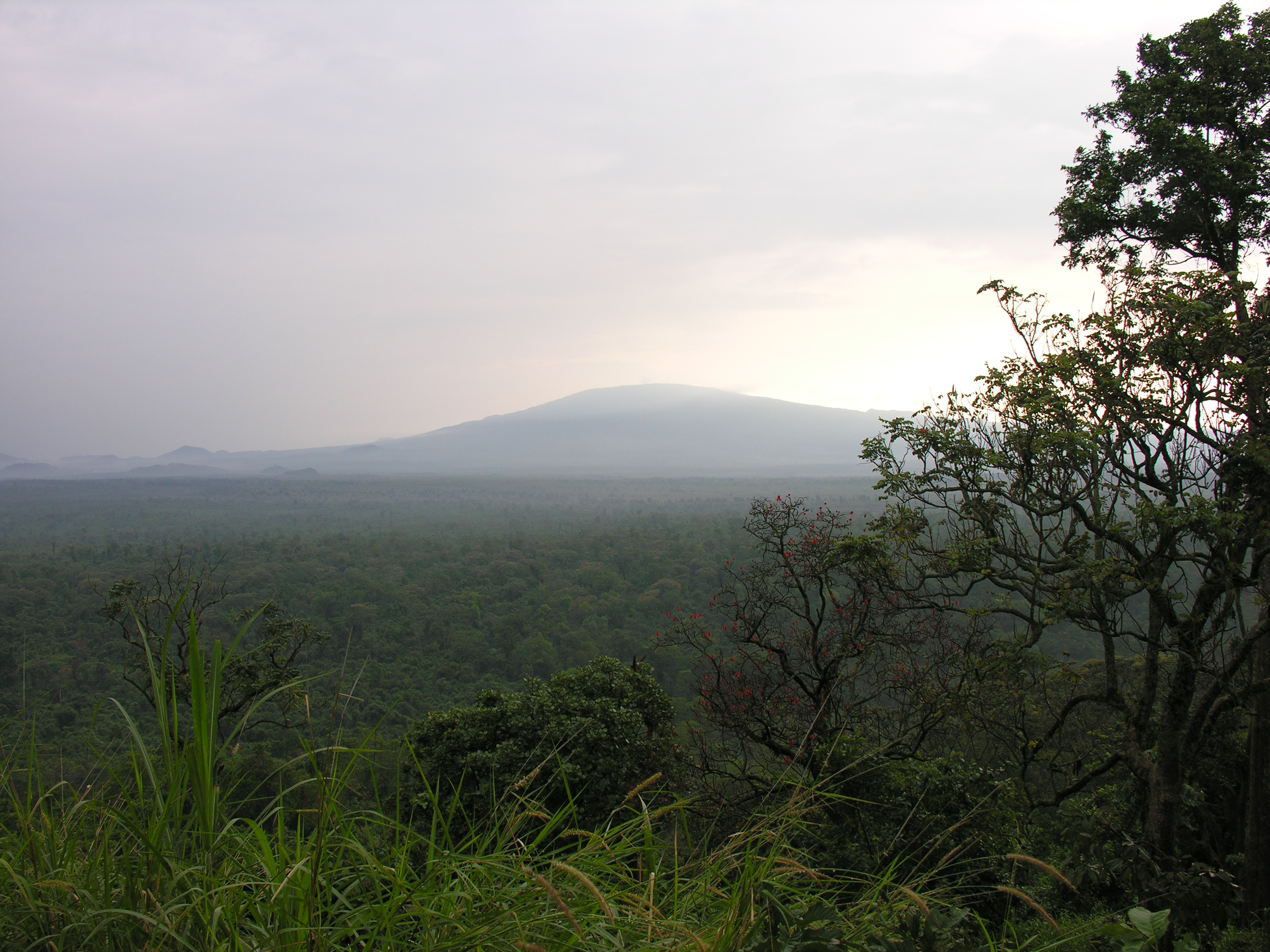
Virunga National Park, Albertine Rift, Africa

Study of Metasequoia milleri root material was reported by a paleobotanical team led by Ruth Stockey in 2001. Examination of the rootlets showed preserved mycorrhizal in many cells. The fungi were assigned to an unidentified member of glomalean affinities based on the high similarity to modern morphology and structure of glomalean mycorrhiza associated with M. glyptostroboides. Within the Princeton paleoenvironment, the trees were an integral part of the lowland wetlands environment, unlike modern M. glyptostroboides which is restricted to riparian lowlands alongside streams and rivers, but not in areas of constant standing water.

The Princeton chert preserves an aquatic system with silica rich slow moving waters which was likely a peat fen ecosystem. While other fossil producing areas of the Allenby Formation are likely the product of deep water deposition and diatomite sedimentation, the chert layers originate from shallow waters, as evidenced by plant and animal fossils. The Okanagan Highland sites, such as the Princeton chert represent upland lake systems that were surrounded by a warm temperate ecosystem with nearby volcanism. The highlands likely had a mesic upper microthermal to lower mesothermal climate, in which winter temperatures rarely dropped low enough for snow and which were seasonably equitable. The Okanagan Highlands paleoforest surrounding the lakes have been described as precursors to the modern temperate broadleaf and mixed forests of Eastern North America and Eastern Asia. Based on the fossil biotas, the lakes were higher and cooler than the coeval coastal forests preserved in the Puget Group and Chuckanut Formation of Western Washington, which are described as lowland tropical forest ecosystems. Estimates of the paleoelevation range between 0.7–1.2 km (0.43–0.75 mi) higher than the coastal forests. This is consistent with the paleoelevation estimates for the lake systems, which range between 1.1–2.9 km (0.68–1.80 mi), which is similar to the modern elevation of 0.8 km (0.50 mi) but higher.

Based on statistical comparison to living Metasequoia the climate tolerance for M. milleri has been calculated to have been relatively warmer on average, but with less seasonal temperature swings. This is in accordance with climatology estimates for the larger Allenby Formation. Estimates of the mean annual temperature have been derived from climate leaf analysis multivariate program (CLAMP) analysis and leaf margin analysis (LMA) of the Princeton paleoflora. The CLAMP results after multiple linear regressions for Princeton's gave a 5.1 °C (41.2 °F), and the LMA returned a mean annual temperature of 5.1 ± 2.2 °C (41.2 ± 4.0 °F). This is lower than the mean annual temperature estimates given for the coastal Puget Group, which is estimated to have been between 15–18.6 °C (59.0–65.5 °F). The bioclimatic analysis for Princeton suggest mean annual precipitation amount of 114 ± 42 cm (45 ± 17 in).

The warm temperate uplands floras of the Allenby Formation and greater highlands in association with downfaulted lacustrine basins and active volcanism are noted to have no exact modern equivalents. This is due to the more seasonally equitable conditions of the Early Eocene, resulting in much lower seasonal temperature shifts. However, the highlands have been compared to the upland ecological islands in the Virunga Mountains within the Albertine Rift of the African rift valley.
