= Sequoia jeholensis =

Sequoia jeholensis Temporal range: Middle Jurassic–Early Cretaceous

Scientific classification
- Kingdom: Plantae
- Clade: Embryophytes
- Clade: Tracheophytes
- Clade: Gymnosperms
- Division: Pinophyta
- Class: Pinopsida
- Order: Cupressales
- Family: Cupressaceae
- Genus: Sequoia
- Species: †S. jeholensis

Binomial name
- †Sequoia jeholensis Endo

Species of extinct redwood

Sequoia jeholensis is an extinct species of conifer that existed during Jurassic and Cretaceous periods from 174.7-118.9 MYA. The earlier fossils come from the Middle to Late Jurassic in what is now Liaoning Province, China. Remains dated the Early Cretaceous are known from Inner Mongolia. It is considered one of the earliest known representatives of the genus Sequoia. The discovery of S. jeholensis suggests that the genus Sequoia may have originated in Asia before spreading to other regions.

== Discovery and naming ==
The species was first described by Japanese paleobotanist Seido Endo in 1951 from fossils recovered in the Lycoptera beds of Lingyuan, Jehol (modern-day Liaoning, China). These Jurassic deposits are probably from the Haifanggou Formation (sometimes called the Jiulongshan Formation). The fossil material, consisting of a well-preserved branchlet, was recognized for its close resemblance to the foliage of the modern coast redwood (Sequoia sempervirens). The discovery extended the known evolutionary history of Sequoia back to the Jurassic, significantly earlier than the previous oldest records, which were from the Cretaceous.

Another specimen was found in the Jiufotang Formation in Inner Mongolia.

== Description ==
The holotype consists of a branchlet approximately 15 cm long and 1 cm wide. Ordinary leaves are spirally arranged in two lines, linear to lance-shaped, with a decurrent base and a slightly furrowed midrib. The scaly leaves are present in early spring growth and at the base of lateral shoots.

== See also ==
- Sequoia dakotensis
