= Sequoia condita =

Sequoia condita Temporal range: Early Cretaceous

Scientific classification
- Kingdom: Plantae
- Clade: Embryophytes
- Clade: Tracheophytes
- Clade: Gymnosperms
- Division: Pinophyta
- Class: Pinopsida
- Order: Cupressales
- Family: Cupressaceae
- Genus: Sequoia
- Species: †S. condita

Binomial name
- †Sequoia condita Lesquereux

Species of extinct redwood

Sequoia condita is an extinct species of conifer from the Early Cretaceous. Fossils have been found in Canada (British Columbia, Alberta) and the United States (Kansas).
