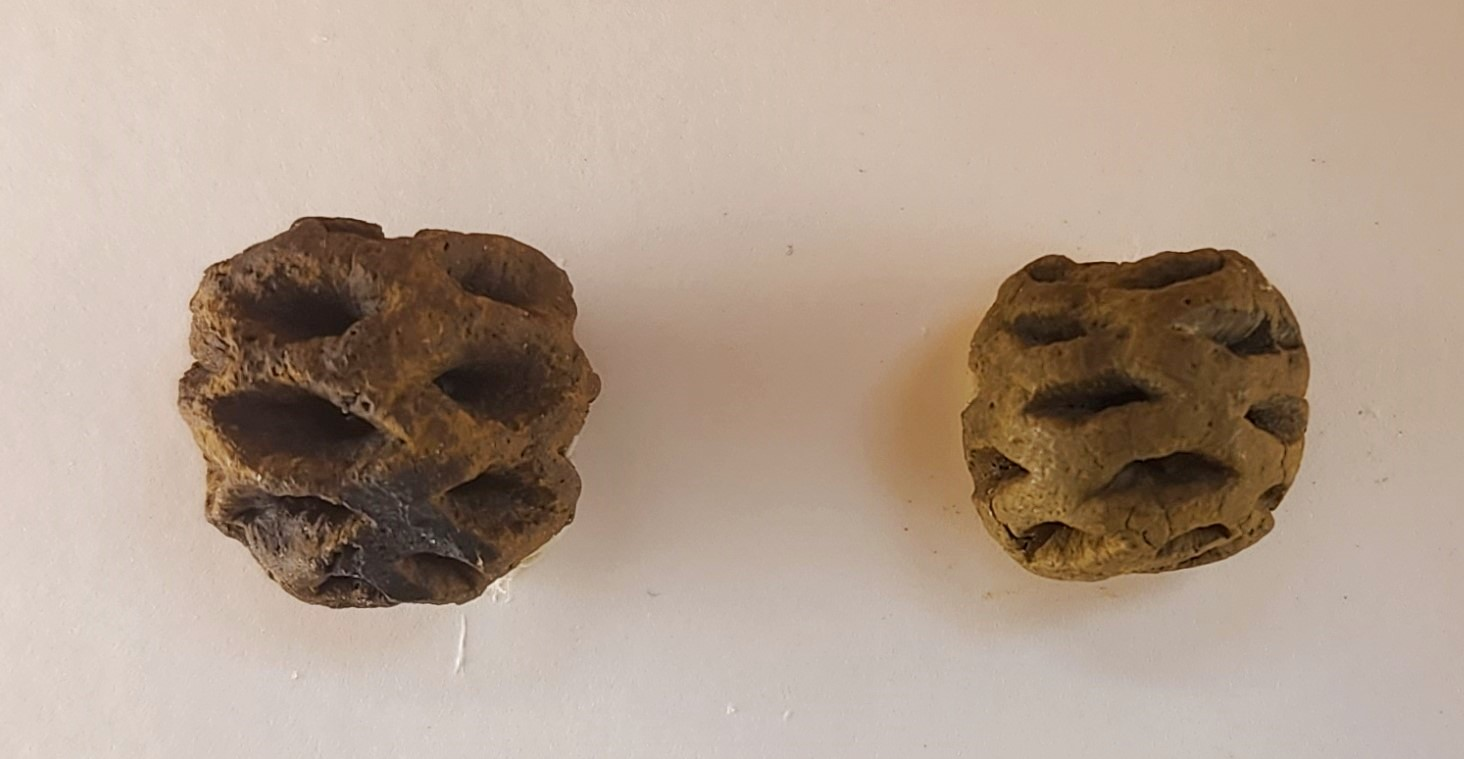
- Two Sequoites dakotensis cones

Scientific classification
- Kingdom: Plantae
- Clade: Tracheophytes
- Clade: Gymnospermae
- Division: Pinophyta
- Class: Pinopsida
- Order: Cupressales
- Family: Cupressaceae
- Genus: †Sequoites
- Species: †S. dakotensis

Binomial name
- †Sequoites dakotensis (R.W. Br.) Bell

Synonyms
- Sequoiites artus; Sequoia dakotensis

= Sequoites dakotensis =

Sequoites dakotensis Temporal range: Late Cretaceous

Species of extinct redwood

Sequoites dakotensis, previously known as Sequoia dakotensis, was a species of plant that existed during the end of the Cretaceous. Originally described as a coniferous tree in the genus Sequoia from fossils found in the U.S. state of North Dakota, further discoveries in the Canadian province of Saskatchewan indicate that it may have instead belonged to the genus Parataxodium. The species was first described by the paleobotanist Roland W. Brown in 1935 from fossilized cones found in the Hell Creek Formation along the Cannonball River in North Dakota. The cones had no natural connection to foliage, meaning no description of the species's foliage could be given; this was not unusual among Sequoia species described from fossils.

In 1949, the paleobotanist Walter A. Bell renamed the species, moving it to the cupressaceous fossil taxon Sequoites dakotensis, based on cone fossils found near Edmonton. In 2002, a posthumously published paper by Elisabeth E. McIver recorded fossils featuring cones aligned with S. dakotensis but instead demonstrating deciduous foliage. McIver believed the plant likely to belong to the extinct genus Parataxodium, a position reaffirmed by Kevin Aulenback in his 2009 review of the Horseshoe Canyon Formation flora.

== Description ==
Sequoites dakotensis is an extinct species originally described as a coniferous tree in the genus Sequoia that lived during the Upper Cretaceous. The species possessed cones that were between 1.5–4 cm (0.59–1.57 in) long with diameters between 1.2–3 cm (0.47–1.18 in). Each cone featured about 30 scales arranged in two spirals around the central axis. Brown described the scale arrangement in terms of rows grouped perpendicular to the central cone axis, stating the "more flat-angled" scales were in three rows and the "more steep-angled" grouped in 5 rows. The surface of these scales were smooth or occasionally slightly wrinkled. While the scale peduncle narrows to a wedge shape at the cone axis. Later discoveries of fossils of foliage – including leaves and seeds – alongside cones matching those described as S. dakotensis instead suggest that the species was part of the genus Parataxodium. This would make the species instead deciduous.

== Taxonomy ==
The paleobotanist Roland W. Brown first described the species Sequoia dakotensis in a 1935 article in The Journal of the Washington Academy of Sciences. His description relied upon "ferruginous [rusty] mud casts" of the cavities left when the original cones decayed. The type locality is the Hell Creek Formation at locality 6600 on the Cannonball River in North Dakota. A syntype is held in the collections of the Smithsonian Institution.

Brown described S. dakotensis as a new species based on specimens of cones lacking natural attachment to any foliage. At the time of this initial description of S. dakotensis, there were approximately 50 accepted species of Sequoia that had been described from American fossils dating from between the Lower Cretaceous and the Pleistocene. Of these, only a few were described based on wood rather than cones or foliage. Brown said there were limitations in identifying a species based on foliage alone, saying that foliage was "extremely variable and therefore not reliably diagnostic". Because of this, the foliage associated with this species could not be determined.

Paleontologist Walter A. Bell, writing for a paper published by the Canadian Department of Mines and Resources in 1949, renamed the species as Sequoiites dakotensis moving Brown's species to the extinct cupressaceous genus Sequoiites. Bell was utilizing cones from near Edmonton to make this description. In 2002, a posthumously published article in Canadian Journal of Earth Sciences by paleobotanist Elisabeth E. McIver described fossilized cones matching Brown's description of S. dakotensis in the Frenchman Formation southeast of Eastend, Saskatchewan. Associated with these cones were fossils of leaves and seeds that indicated the plant was not part of the genera Sequoia or Metasequoia, but instead more aligned with Parataxodium, a genus that favored lowland forests and swamps.

The affinity of the fossil cones with Parataxodium was reaffirmed by Kevin Aulenback in his review of the Cretaceous Horseshoe Canyon Formation flora surrounding Drumheller, Alberta, Canada. He agreed with McIlver's assessment of the cone and foliage arrangement matching Parataxodium and not Sequoia or Sequoites. Additionally, Aulenback identified the pollen branchlet species Juniperites gracilis of Bell (1949) Drumhellera kurmanniae of Rudolph Serbet and Ruth Stockey (1991) as also belonging to the same plant. Aulenback also included the foliage species Elatocladus intermedius (Hollick) (Bell 1949), where needles are born on the branchlet in a single plane, and Sequoites artus (Bell 1949), where the needles are helically arranged as also belonging to the same plant. While connecting the various form taxa into a larger whole plant concept, Aulenback did not take the formal taxonomic nomenclature steps to synonymize the various species into a whole.

== Distribution ==
Instances of cones associated with Sequoites dakotensis were found in the Upper Cretaceous sediments near Marmarth and later along the Cannonball River in North Dakota. These sites are now recognized as coming from Hell Creek Formation sediments. In his original description, Brown said a fossilized Sequoia cone described by Frank Knowlton from near Wild Horse Lake in Alberta aligned with the characteristics of S. dakotensis. Fossil cones identified as S. dakotensis and found in association with unattached Torreyites branchlets were reported by Peter Dodson (1971) from riverine deposits in the Oldman Formation outcropping in Dinosaur Provincial Park, Alberta.

Fossil cones potentially conspecific with S. dakotensis were observed from several Cretaceous formations in central Canada including the Edmonton Formation and Wapiti Group in Alberta and the Frenchman Formation in Saskatchewan. McIver identified cones matching the species' description in a Cretaceous-era formation southeast of Eastend, Saskatchewan. McIver believed that the associated foliage indicated that the species was "deciduous, occupying such environments as lowland forests and back swamps".
