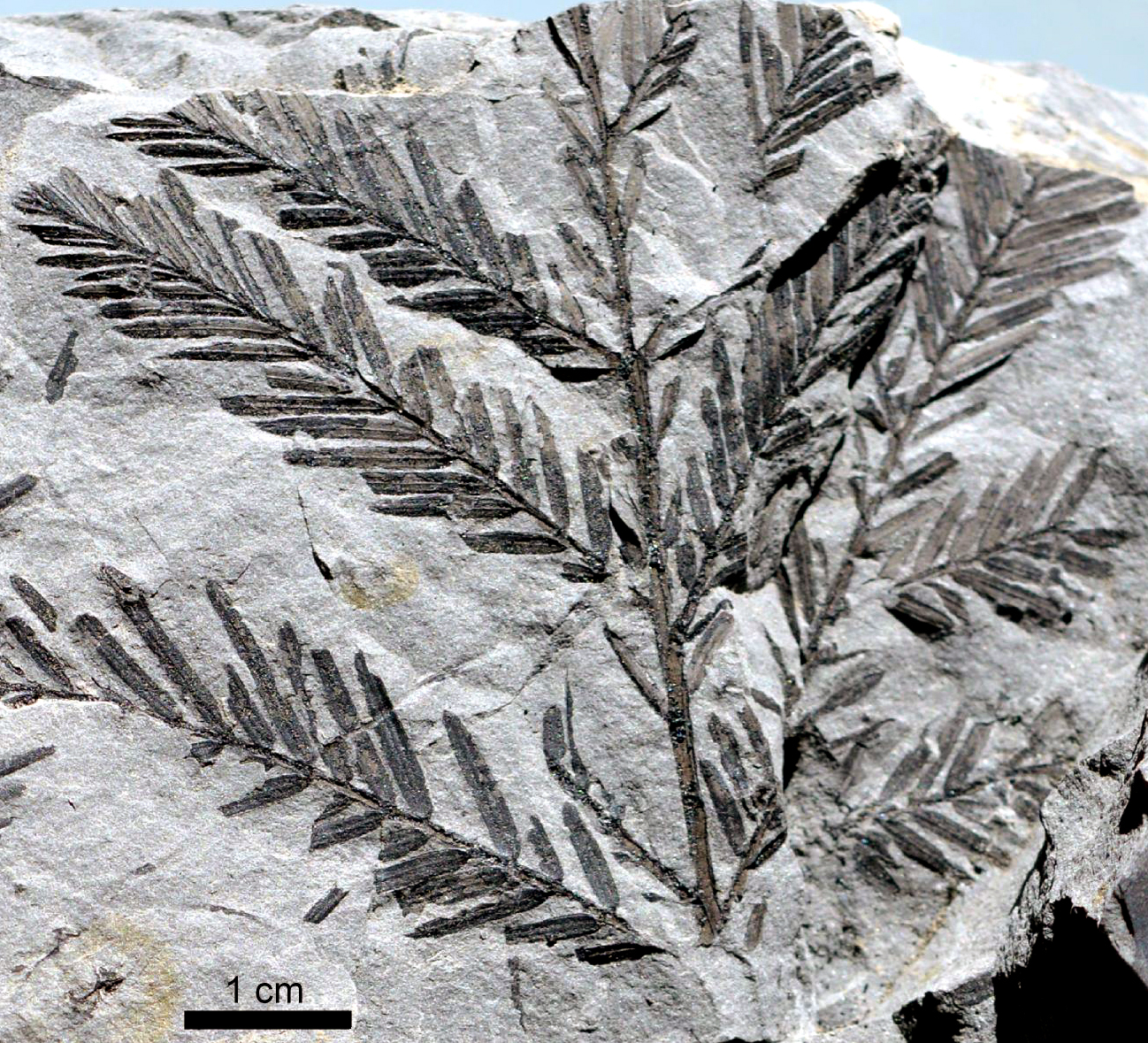
- Metasequoia occidentalis foliage; early Paleocene, Alberta, Canada

Scientific classification
- Kingdom: Plantae
- Clade: Embryophytes
- Clade: Tracheophytes
- Clade: Spermatophytes
- Clade: Gymnospermae
- Division: Pinophyta
- Class: Pinopsida
- Order: Cupressales
- Family: Cupressaceae
- Genus: Metasequoia
- Species: †M. occidentalis

Binomial name
- †Metasequoia occidentalis (J.S. Newberry) Chaney, 1951

Synonyms
- Taxodium occidentaleJ.S. Newberry, 1863; M. japonica(Endo) Miki

= Metasequoia occidentalis =

Metasequoia occidentalis Temporal range: Late Cretaceous–Pliocene

Extinct species of conifer

Metasequoia occidentalis is an extinct redwood species of the family Cupressaceae that is found as fossils throughout the Northern Hemisphere. It is one of three extinct species of Metasequoia that are currently recognized as valid.

== History ==
The species was first described in 1863 from fossils found in the outcrops of the Late Paleocene-Middle Eocene Chuckanut Formation around Birch Bay, Washington. The species was originally described as Taxodium occidentale by John Strong Newberry. Fossilized Metasequoia-like remains were noted in Europe and North America from the 1800s on, but were assigned to the cupressaceous genera Sequoia (redwoods) and Taxodium (bald cypresses). It was not until the living species Metasequoia glyptostroboides was discovered and described from a remote area of China during the 1940s, that the affinity of many of the fossils became apparent. In 1951, the species was reassigned to Metasequoia as M. occidentalis by Ralph Works Chaney based on the close resemblance to living Metasequoia. With a few notable exceptions, it has been claimed that the majority of the fossils documented in the literature show that M. occidentalis was indistinguishable from living M. glyptostroboides due to the quality of the compression preservation reported up to the 1980's.

== Description ==
Like living Metasequoia, M. occidentalis was deciduous. The foliage consists of branchlets with oppositely arranged leaves. The leaves are ovate to linear in shape, ranging from 6–25 mm (0.24–0.98 in) in length and 1–2 mm (0.039–0.079 in) in width, with a distinct midvein, a petiolate base, and an acute tip. The seed-bearing cones are globose to ovoid, 11–40 mm (0.43–1.57 in) long and 6–34 mm (0.24–1.34 in) wide, with decussately arranged triangular scales, and are borne on long, leafless stalks. The seeds have two wings, are ovoid to cordate in shape, and are up to 5 mm (0.20 in) long and 4 mm (0.16 in) wide. The pollen-bearing cones are small, globose to ovoid, 1–5 mm (0.039–0.197 in) long and 0.5–4 mm (0.020–0.157 in) wide, and oppositely arranged on specialized stalks with one terminal cone.

== Age and distribution ==
Metasequoia occidentalis appeared in fossil record during the Late Cretaceous epoch (Cenomanian stage). By the Tertiary period, it had become a major constituent of lowland and swampy forests in the northern circum-Pacific and polar regions, where it commonly coexisted with Glyptostrobus europaeus. Fossils assignable to M. occidentalis have been reported from parts of the United States, Canada, Russia, China, Japan, Greenland and Svalbard, but Metasequoia appears to have been rare or absent in much of Europe.

M. occidentalis cones
Klondike Mountain Formation

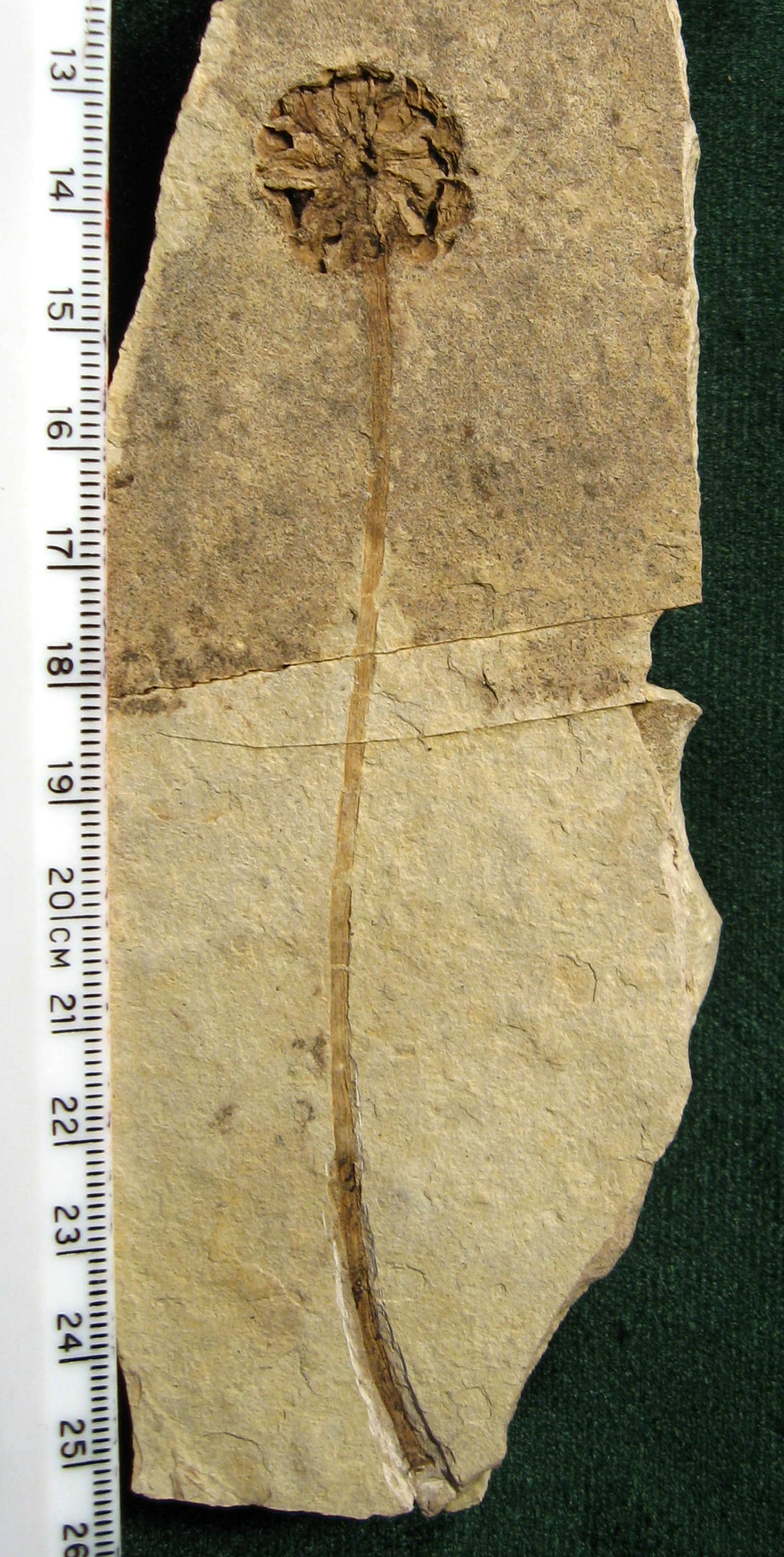
ovulate

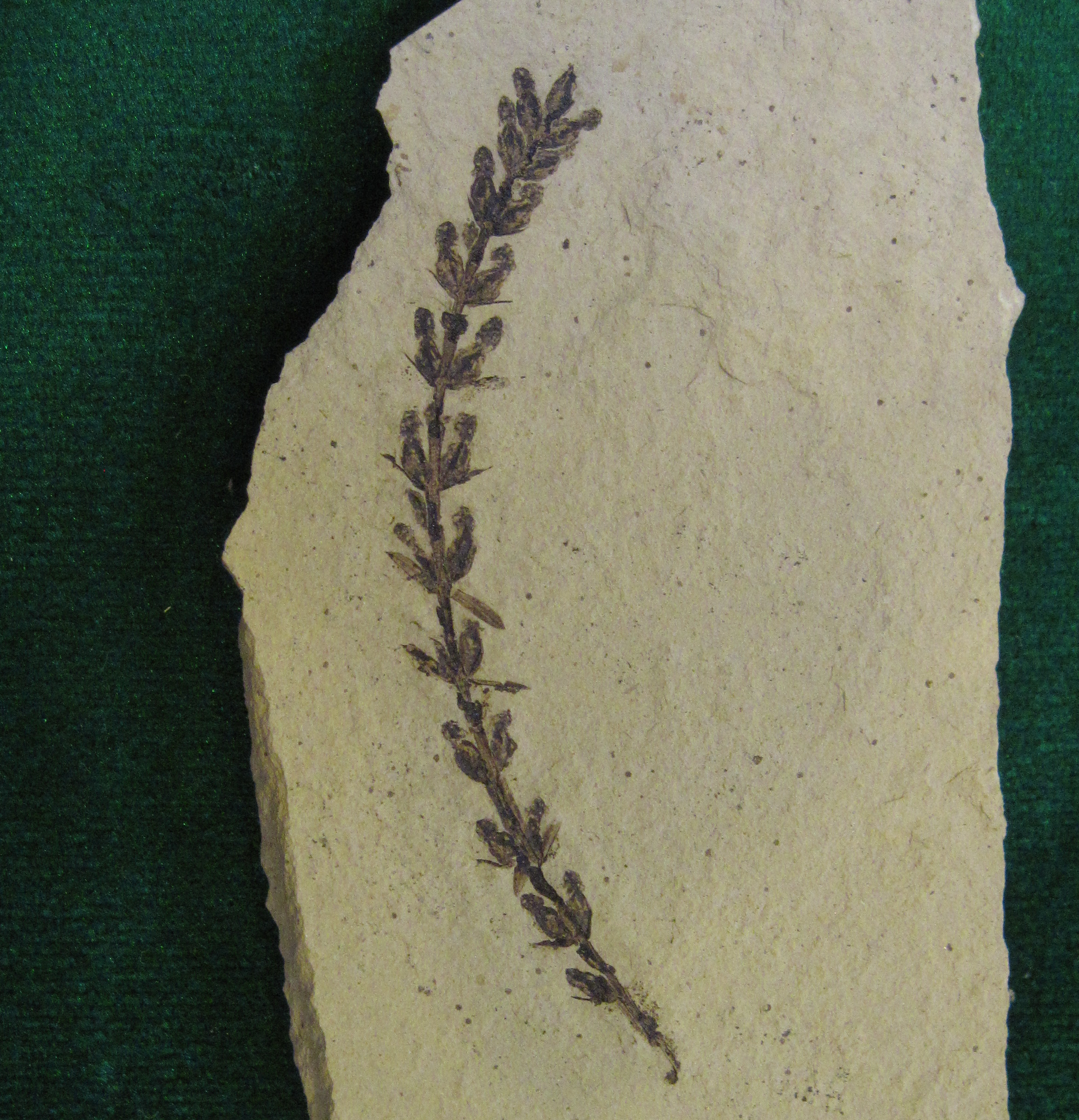
pollen
