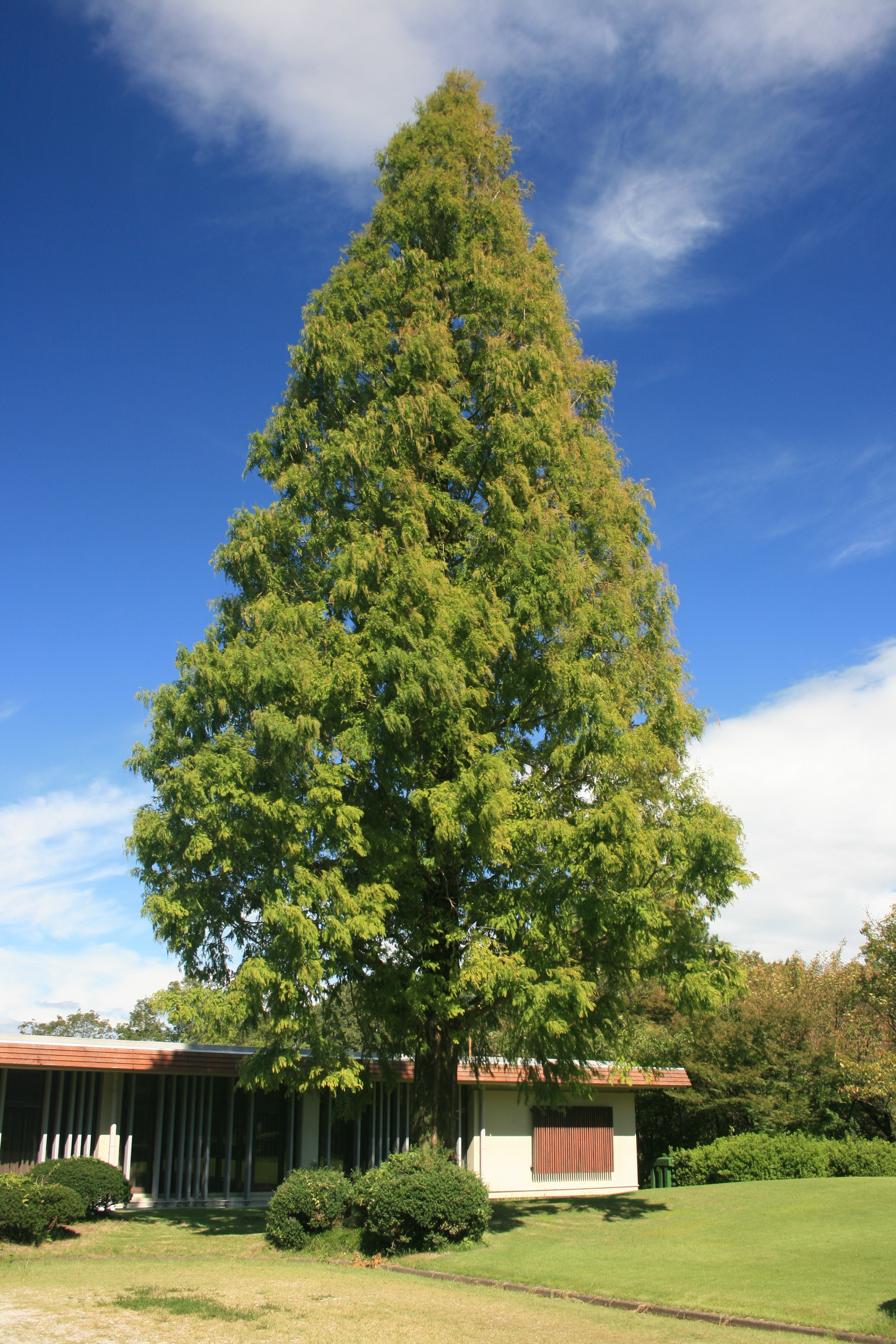
- Metasequoia glyptostroboides

Scientific classification
- Kingdom: Plantae
- Clade: Tracheophytes
- Clade: Gymnosperms
- Division: Pinophyta
- Class: Pinopsida
- Order: Cupressales
- Family: Cupressaceae
- Subfamily: Sequoioideae
- Genus: Metasequoia; Hu & Cheng

Type species
- Metasequoia glyptostroboides Hu & Cheng

Species
- †M. disticha; †M. foxii; M. glyptostroboides; †M. heerii; †M. milleri; †M. occidentalis

= Metasequoia =

Metasequoia Temporal range: Late Cretaceous–Present

Genus of conifers

Metasequoia, or dawn redwood, is a genus of fast-growing coniferous trees. It contains one extant (living) species, Metasequoia glyptostroboides, which is one of three extant species of conifers known as redwoods in the world. Metasequoia glyptostroboides is native to Lichuan county in Hubei, China. Although the shortest of the redwoods, it grows to at least 165 feet (50 meters) in height. Local villagers refer to the original tree from which most others derive as Shuǐshān (水杉), or "water fir", which is part of a local shrine. Since its rediscovery in 1944, the dawn redwood has become a popular ornamental, with examples found in various parks in a variety of countries.

Together with Sequoia sempervirens (coast redwood) and Sequoiadendron giganteum (giant sequoia) of California, Metasequoia is classified in the Cupressaceae subfamily Sequoioideae. M. glyptostroboides is the only living species in its genus, but three fossil species are known. Sequoioideae and several other genera have been transferred from the former family Taxodiaceae to Cupressaceae based on DNA analysis.

== Paleontology ==
Metasequoia redwood fossils are known from many areas in the Northern Hemisphere; more than 20 fossil species have been named (some were even identified as the genus Sequoia), but are considered as just three species, M. foxii, M. milleri, and M. occidentalis. Fossils are known from the Cenomanian onwards. During the Paleocene and Eocene, extensive forests of Metasequoia occurred as far north as Strathcona Fiord on Ellesmere Island and sites on Axel Heiberg Island (northern Canada) at around 80° N latitude. Metasequoia was likely deciduous by this time. Given that the high latitudes in this period were warm and tropical, it is hypothesized that the deciduous trait evolved in response to the unusual light availability patterns, not to major seasonal variations in temperature. During three months in the summer, the sun would shine continuously, while three months of the winter would be complete darkness. It is also hypothesized that the change from evergreen to deciduous trait occurred before colonizing the high latitudes and was the reason Metasequoia was dominant in the north.

Large petrified trunks and stumps of the extinct Metasequoia occidentalis (formerly identified as Sequoia occidentalis) also make up the major portion of Tertiary fossil plant material in the badlands of western North Dakota.

The trees are well known from late Cretaceous to Miocene strata, but no fossils are known after that. Before its discovery, the taxon was presumed to have become extinct during the Miocene; when it was discovered extant, it was heralded as a "living fossil".

== Appearance ==
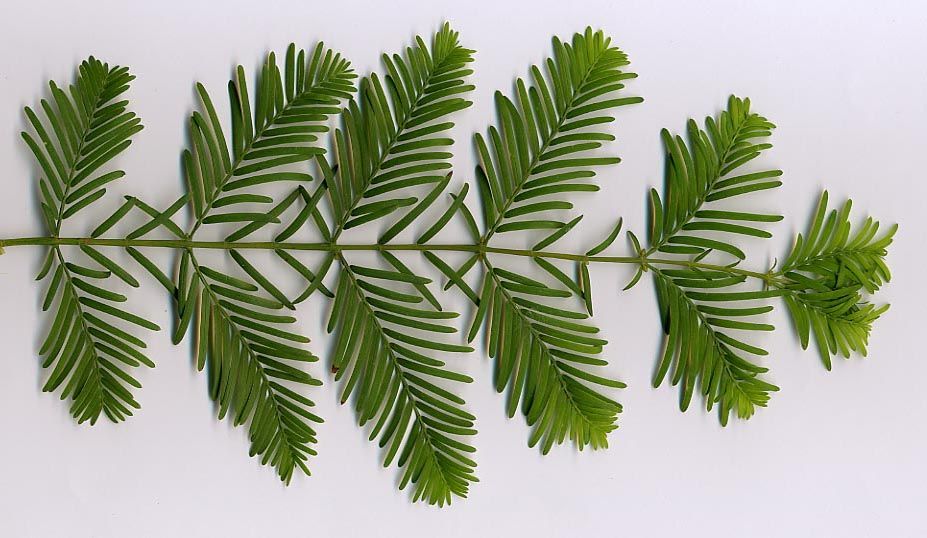
Dawn redwood foliage – note opposite arrangement

The bark and foliage are similar to Sequoia, but Metasequoia is deciduous like Taxodium distichum (bald cypress), and, similarly, older specimens form wide buttresses on the lower trunk. It is a fast-growing tree to 130–150 feet (40–45 m) tall and 6 feet (2 m) in trunk diameter in cultivation so far (with the potential to grow even higher).

The leaves are opposite, 0.4–1.25 inches (1–3 cm.) long, and bright fresh green, turning foxy red-brown in fall. The pollen cones are 0.25 inch (6 mm) long, produced on long spikes in early spring; they are only produced on trees growing in regions with hot summers. The cones are globose to ovoid, 0.6–1.0 inches (1.5–2.5 cm.) in diameter with 16–28 scales, arranged in opposite pairs in four rows, each pair at right angles to the adjacent pair; they mature in about 8–9 months after pollination.

Metasequoia has experienced morphological stasis for the past 66 million years: the modern Metasequoia glyptostroboides appears identical to its late Cretaceous ancestors.

== History ==
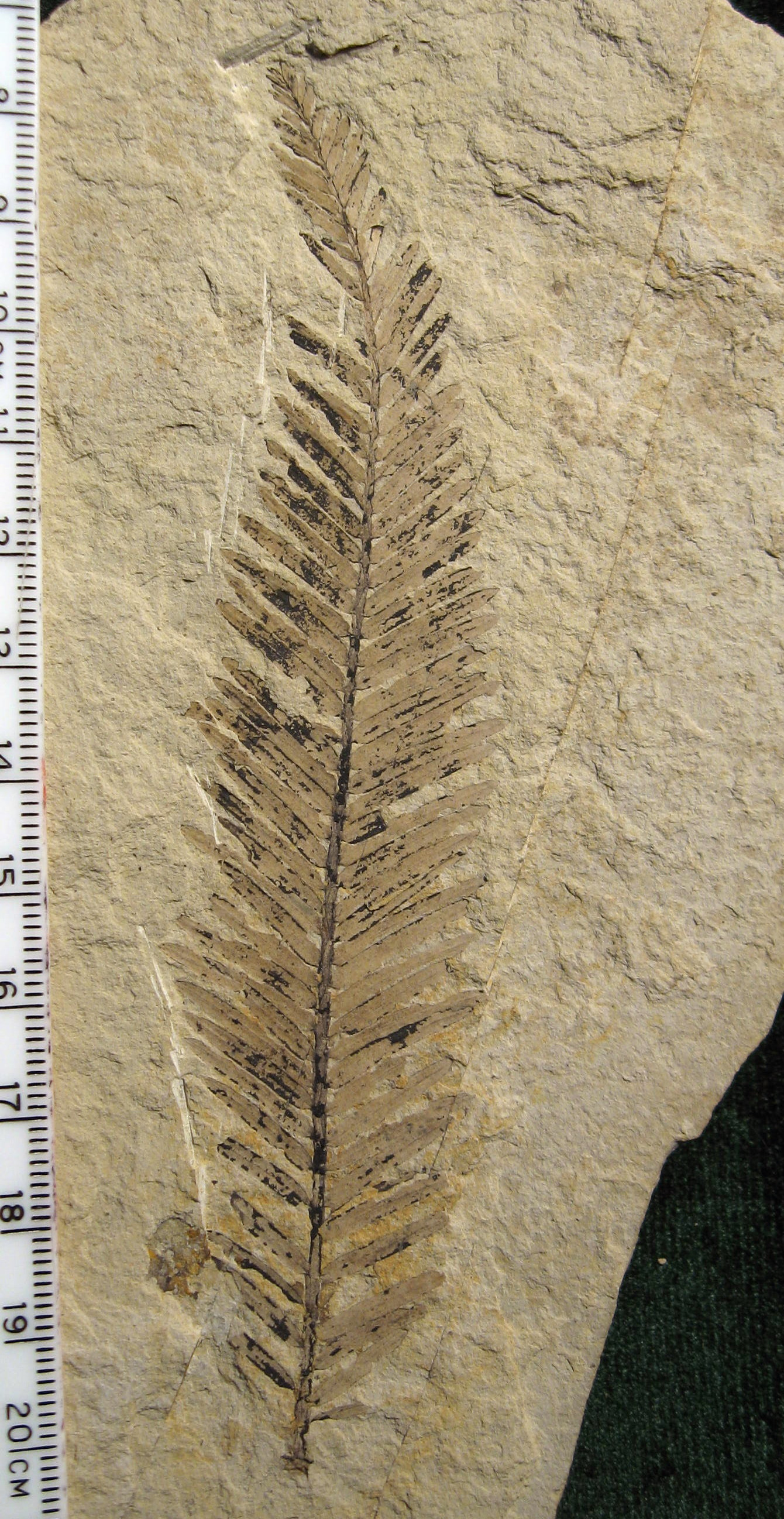
Eocene (Ypresian) age M. occidentalis branchlet

The fossil of this genus was discovered by Shigeru Miki in 1939. In 1941, Miki published the description of the fossil plant which he gave the name "Metasequoia". In the winter of the same year, a Chinese botanist Toh Gan (干铎) discovered an unusual big tree in Modaoxi (磨刀溪; presently, Moudao (谋道), in Lichuan County, Hubei). The locals called this tree shui-sha (水桫). Because it was winter, the tree already lost all its leaves, so no specimens were collected by Mr. Gan. In 1942, another botanist, Mr. Zhan Wang (王战) visited Modaoxi and collected living specimens. Mr. Wang thought this tree belonged to a known species Glyptostrobus pensilis (水松) and filed the specimens away. In 1945, Mr. Wang showed the specimens to botanist Wan Chun Cheng (郑万钧). Mr. Cheng determined that the tree did not belong to Glyptostrobus pensilis, but was a new species. Mr. Cheng then sent a specimen to prominent botanist Hu Xiansu, the director of Fan Memorial Institute of Biology. Hu, despite the chaos of war between China and Japan, was still keeping track of international botanic literature. Hu recognized the living specimen was of the same genus of Miki's fossil genus ''Metasequoia''. After more study, Hu and Cheng published the new species Metasequoia glyptostroboides (Hu et Cheng) in May 1948 in the Bulletin of Fan Memorial Institute of Biology. The discovery of a "living fossil" instantly attracted attention from botanists around the world. It was widely regarded as "the greatest discovery of botany in 20th century". In 1948, the Arnold Arboretum of Harvard University, through the help of Hu and Cheng, funded an expedition by Chinese collectors to collect seeds. Soon after, seeds were distributed to various universities and arboreta worldwide for growth trials.

Presently, a number of natural Metasequoia populations exist in the hills and wetlands of Hubei's Lichuan County. Most of them are small, with fewer than 30 trees each; however, the largest of them, in Xiaohe Valley, is estimated to consist of around 5,400 trees. A few trees are also said to exist in neighboring Hunan.

== Metasequoia in gardens, parks and streets ==
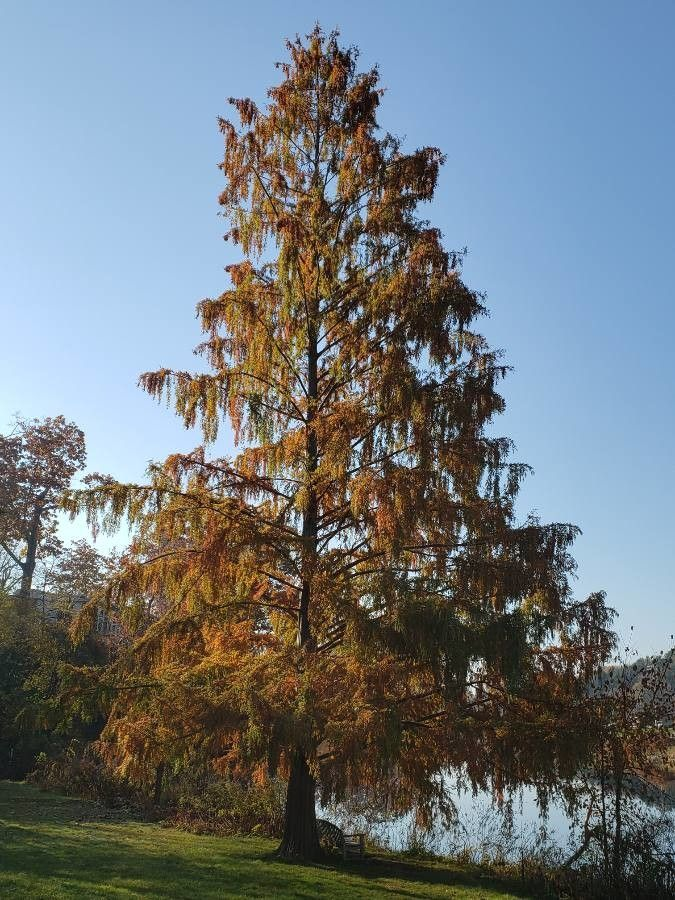
Mature tree in autumn

Dawn redwoods are fast-growing trees. They sometimes grow too large in smaller gardens under favorable conditions, but they can be a good choice for a wide range of larger gardens and parks. Although they live in wet sites in their native habitat they will also tolerate dry soils. Unlike most conifers, their deciduous habit means they do not cast much shade in winter. They are grown as street trees in London and elsewhere.

Strawberry Fields is a landscaped section in New York City's Central Park dedicated to Beatle John Lennon. At the northern end of the lawns are three dawn redwood trees. There are several other dawn redwood trees in New York City, including one in the Liz Christy Garden, planted by Liz Christy herself in the 1970s, and a grove in the Brooklyn Botanical Garden.
