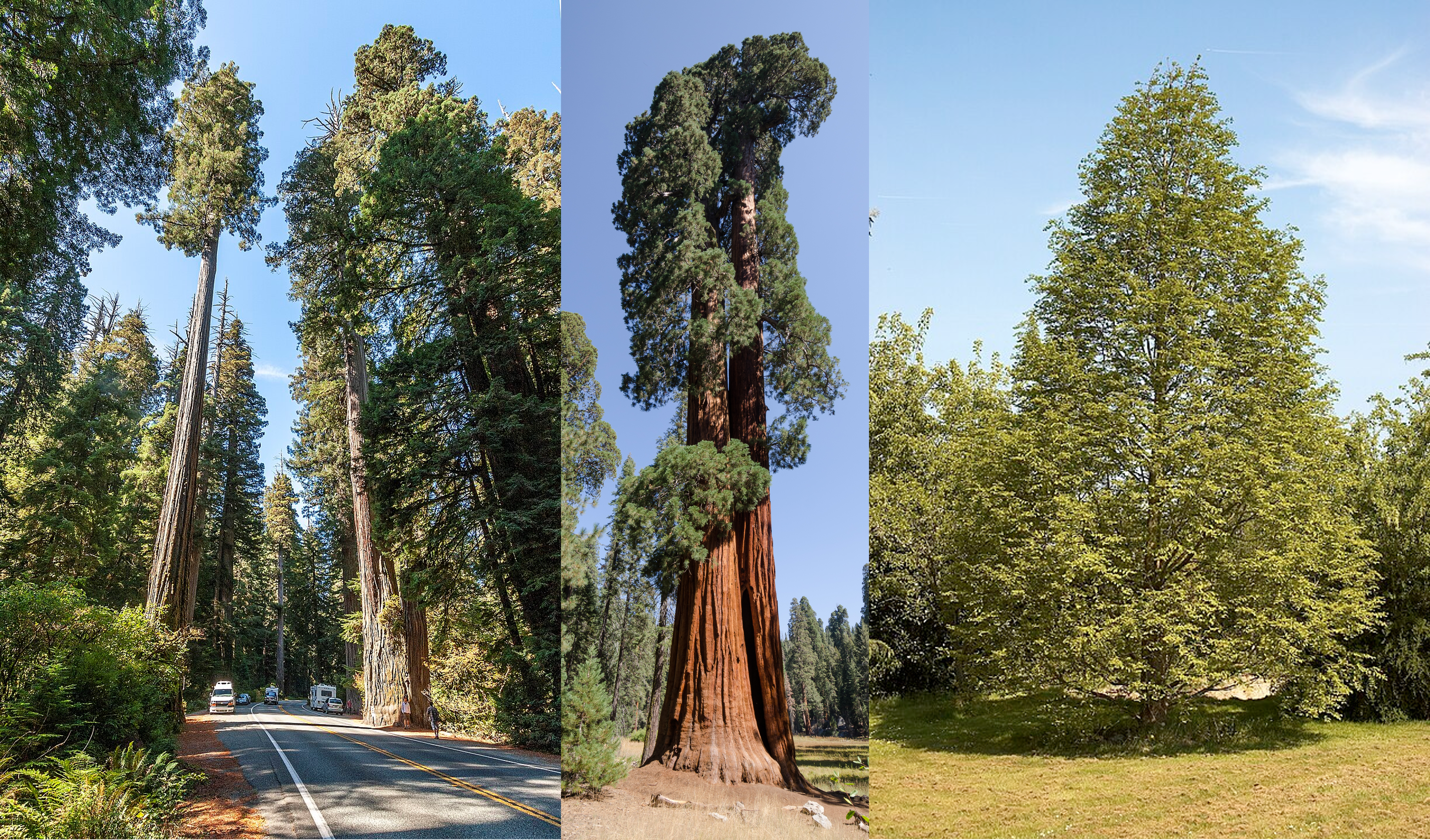
- Sequoia sempervirens (left), Sequoiadendron giganteum (middle), Metasequoia glyptostroboides (right)

Scientific classification
- Kingdom: Plantae
- Clade: Tracheophytes
- Clade: Gymnosperms
- Division: Pinophyta
- Class: Pinopsida
- Order: Cupressales
- Family: Cupressaceae
- Subfamily: Sequoioideae

Genera
- Sequoia; Sequoiadendron; Metasequoia; †Austrosequoia?; †Quasisequoia

= Sequoioideae =

Sequoioideae Temporal range: Middle Jurassic–Present

Subfamily of coniferous trees (redwoods)

Sequoioideae, commonly referred to as redwoods, is a subfamily of coniferous trees within the family Cupressaceae that range in the northern hemisphere. It includes the largest and tallest trees in the world. The trees in the subfamily are amongst the most distinctive trees in the world and are common ornamental trees. The subfamily reached its peak of diversity during the early Cenozoic. They are fast-growing trees that live in temperate climates such as Mediterranean and humid subtropical climates. Three living species are known, the coast redwood (Sequoia sempervirens), the giant redwood (Sequoiadendron giganteum) and the dawn redwood (Metasequoia glyptostroboides). While the coast redwood and the giant redwood are found in the western United States, the dawn redwood is known from China.

== Description ==
The three redwood subfamily genera are Sequoia from coastal California and Oregon, Sequoiadendron from California's Sierra Nevada, and Metasequoia in China. The redwood subfamily contains the largest and tallest trees in the world. The trees can live for thousands of years. Threats include logging, fire suppression, and burl poaching.

Only two of the genera, Sequoia and Sequoiadendron, are known for massive trees. Sequoia sempervirens and Sequoiadendron giganteum are evergreen species. Trees of Metasequoia, from the single living species Metasequoia glyptostroboides, are deciduous, grow much smaller (although are still large compared to most other trees) and can live in colder climates.

== Taxonomy and evolution ==
Multiple studies of both morphological and molecular characters have strongly supported the assertion that the Sequoioideae are monophyletic. Most modern phylogenies place Sequoia as sister to Sequoiadendron and Metasequoia as the out-group. However, Yang et al. went on to investigate the origin of a peculiar genetic component in Sequoioideae, the polyploidy of Sequoia—and generated a notable exception that calls into question the specifics of this relative consensus.

=== Cladistic tree ===
A 2006 paper based on non-molecular evidence suggested the following relationship among extant species:

- - Sequoioideae
    - - Metasequoia
        - M. glyptostroboides (dawn redwood)
      - - Sequoia
          - S. sempervirens (coast redwood)
        - Sequoiadendron
          - S. giganteum (giant sequoia)
  - Taxodioideae

A 2021 study using molecular evidence found the same relationships among Sequoioideae species, but found Sequoioideae to be the sister group to the Athrotaxidoideae (a superfamily presently known only from Tasmania) rather than to Taxodioideae. Sequoioideae and Athrotaxidoideae are thought to have diverged from each other during the Jurassic.

=== Possible reticulate evolution in Sequoioideae ===
Reticulate evolution refers to the origination of a taxon through the merging of ancestor lineages. Polyploidy has come to be understood as quite common in plants—with estimates ranging from 47% to 100% of flowering plants and extant ferns having derived from ancient polyploidy. Within the gymnosperms however it is quite rare. Sequoia sempervirens is hexaploid (2n= 6x= 66). To investigate the origins of this polyploidy Yang et al. used two single copy nuclear genes, LFY and NLY, to generate phylogenetic trees. Other researchers have had success with these genes in similar studies on different taxa.

Several hypotheses have been proposed to explain the origin of Sequoia's polyploidy: allopolyploidy by hybridization between Metasequoia and some probably extinct taxodiaceous plant; Metasequoia and Sequoiadendron, or ancestors of the two genera, as the parental species of Sequoia; and autohexaploidy, autoallohexaploidy, or segmental allohexaploidy.

Yang et al. found that Sequoia was clustered with Metasequoia in the tree generated using the LFY gene but with Sequoiadendron in the tree generated with the NLY gene. Further analysis strongly supported the hypothesis that Sequoia was the result of a hybridization event involving Metasequoia and Sequoiadendron. Thus, Yang et al. hypothesize that the inconsistent relationships among Metasequoia, Sequoia, and Sequoiadendron could be a sign of reticulate evolution by hybrid speciation (in which two species hybridize and give rise to a third) among the three genera. However, the long evolutionary history of the three genera (the earliest fossil remains being from the Jurassic) make resolving the specifics of when and how Sequoia originated once and for all a difficult matter—especially since it in part depends on an incomplete fossil record.

== Extant species ==
- Metasequoia glyptostroboides Hu & W.C.Cheng - Dawn redwood; south-central China.
- Sequoiadendron giganteum (Lindl.) J.Buchh. - Giant sequoia, Giant redwood; western slopes of the Sierra Nevadas; California.
- Sequoia sempervirens (D.Don) Endl. - Coastal Redwood, California redwood; Northern California coast and extreme Southern Oregon.

== Paleontology ==
Sequoioideae is an ancient taxon, with the oldest described Sequoioideae species, Sequoia jeholensis, recovered from Jurassic deposits. The fossil wood Medulloprotaxodioxylon, reported from the late Triassic of China, resembles Sequoiadendron giganteum and may represent an ancestral form of the Sequoioideae; this supports the idea of a Late Triassic Norian origin for this subfamily.

The fossil record shows a massive expansion of range in the Cretaceous and dominance of the Arcto-Tertiary Geoflora, especially in northern latitudes. Genera of Sequoioideae were found in the Arctic Circle, Europe, North America, and throughout Asia and Japan. A general cooling trend beginning in the late Eocene and Oligocene reduced the northern ranges of the Sequoioideae, as did subsequent ice ages. Evolutionary adaptations to ancient environments persist in all three species despite changing climate, distribution, and associated flora, especially the specific demands of their reproduction ecology that ultimately forced each of the species into refugial ranges where they could survive.

The extinct genus Austrosequoia, known from the Late Cretaceous-Oligocene of the Southern Hemisphere, including Australia and New Zealand, has been suggested as a member of the subfamily.

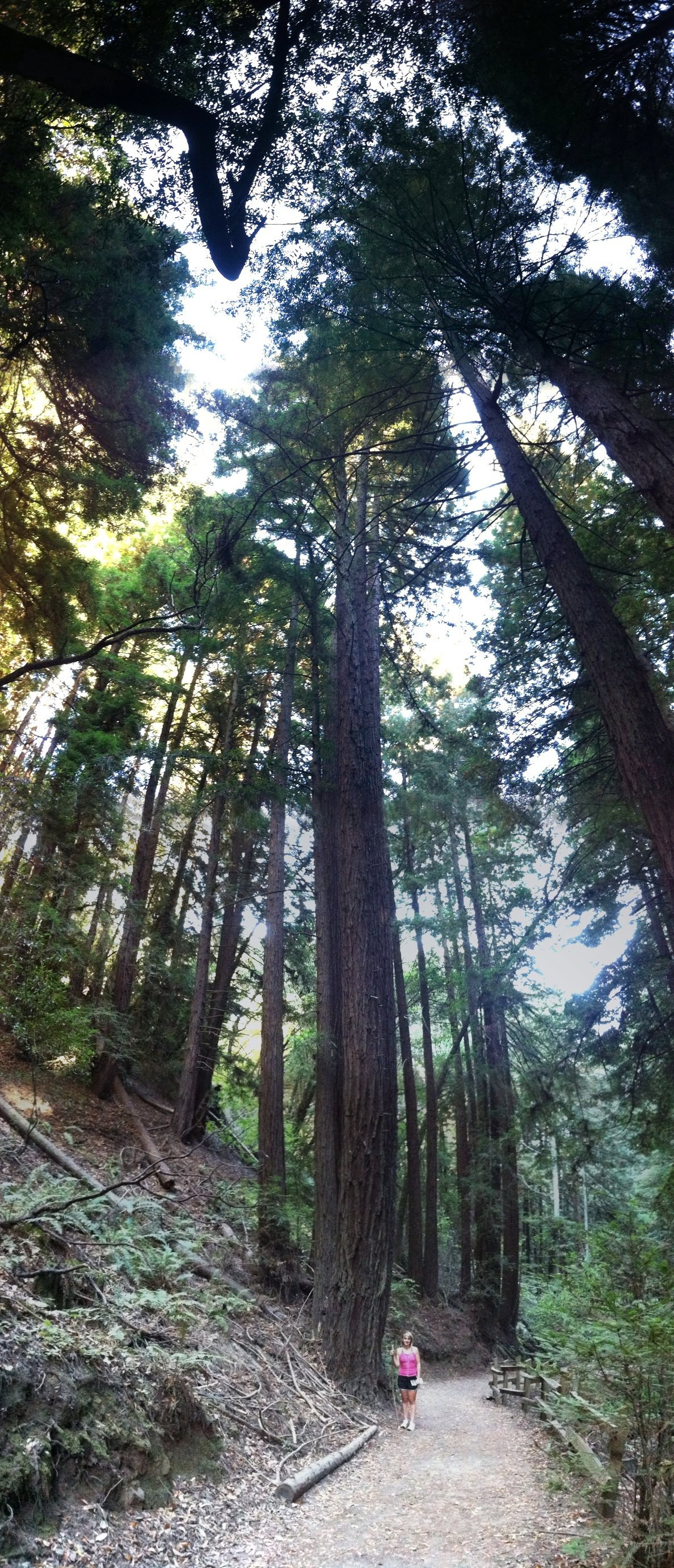
Young but already tall redwood trees (Sequoia sempervirens) in Oakland, California

== Conservation ==
The entire subfamily is endangered. The IUCN Red List Category & Criteria assesses Sequoia sempervirens as Endangered (A2acd), Sequoiadendron giganteum as Endangered (B2ab) and Metasequoia glyptostroboides as Endangered (B1ab).

In 2024 it was reported that over a period of two years about one-fifth of all giant sequoias were killed by extreme wildfires in California. It is hypothesized that human intervention disrupting regular forest fires may have exacerbated modern fire intensity. The giant sequoia's lifecycle is connected to wildfires. There is ongoing debate over whether replanting seedlings should be actively pursued or if the landscape should be left completely to natural processes.

In 2024, it was estimated that there were about 500,000 redwoods in Britain, mostly brought as seeds and seedlings from the US in the Victorian era.

== See also ==
- Temperate cloud forest of North American west coast (Sequoia forests)

== Bibliography and links ==
- "About the trees". National Park Service.
- "A few basic facts about Redwoods, and Parks". National Park Service.
- "Calaveras Big Trees Association".
- Hanks, Doug (2005). "Crescent Ridge Dawn Redwood Preserve".
- de:Liste der dicksten Mammutbäume in Deutschland. List of Large Giant Redwoods in Germany
- IUCN 2013. IUCN Red List of Threatened Species. Version 2013.2. Downloaded on 10 January 2014.
- James Donald, John Rubin (directors) (2009). Climbing Redwood Giants (film). National Geographic. Archived from the original on 12 April 2013.
- "Big trees". Notes from the Field tv. 6 minutes in. PBS.
