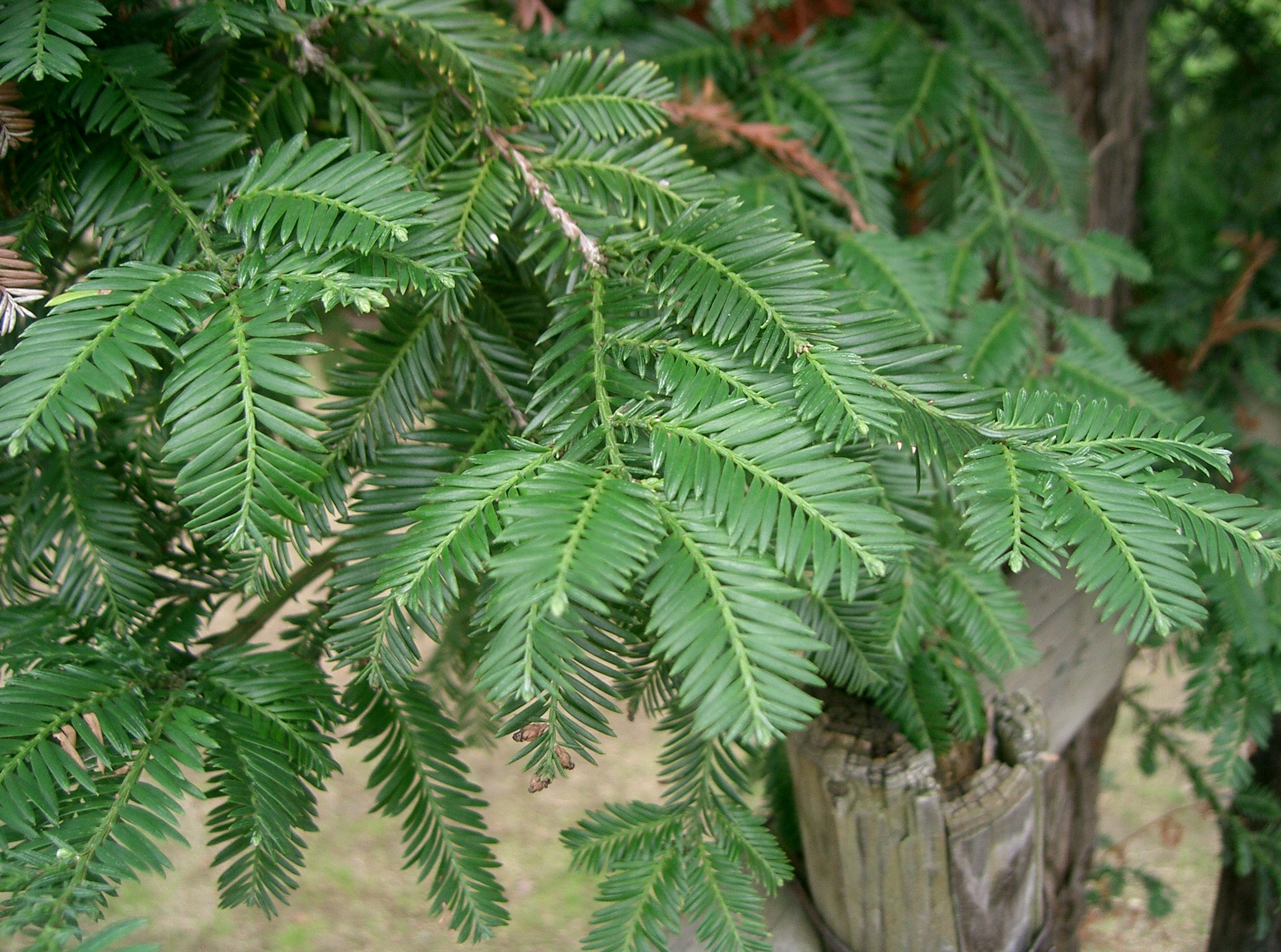
- Sequoia sempervirens

Scientific classification
- Kingdom: Plantae
- Clade: Embryophytes
- Clade: Tracheophytes
- Clade: Gymnosperms
- Division: Pinophyta
- Class: Pinopsida
- Order: Cupressales
- Family: Cupressaceae
- Subfamily: Sequoioideae
- Genus: Sequoia; Endl. nom. cons.

Type species
- Sequoia sempervirens Endl.

Species
- S. sempervirens; †S. affinis; †S.condita?; †S. jeholensis; †S. magnifica; †S. portlandica?
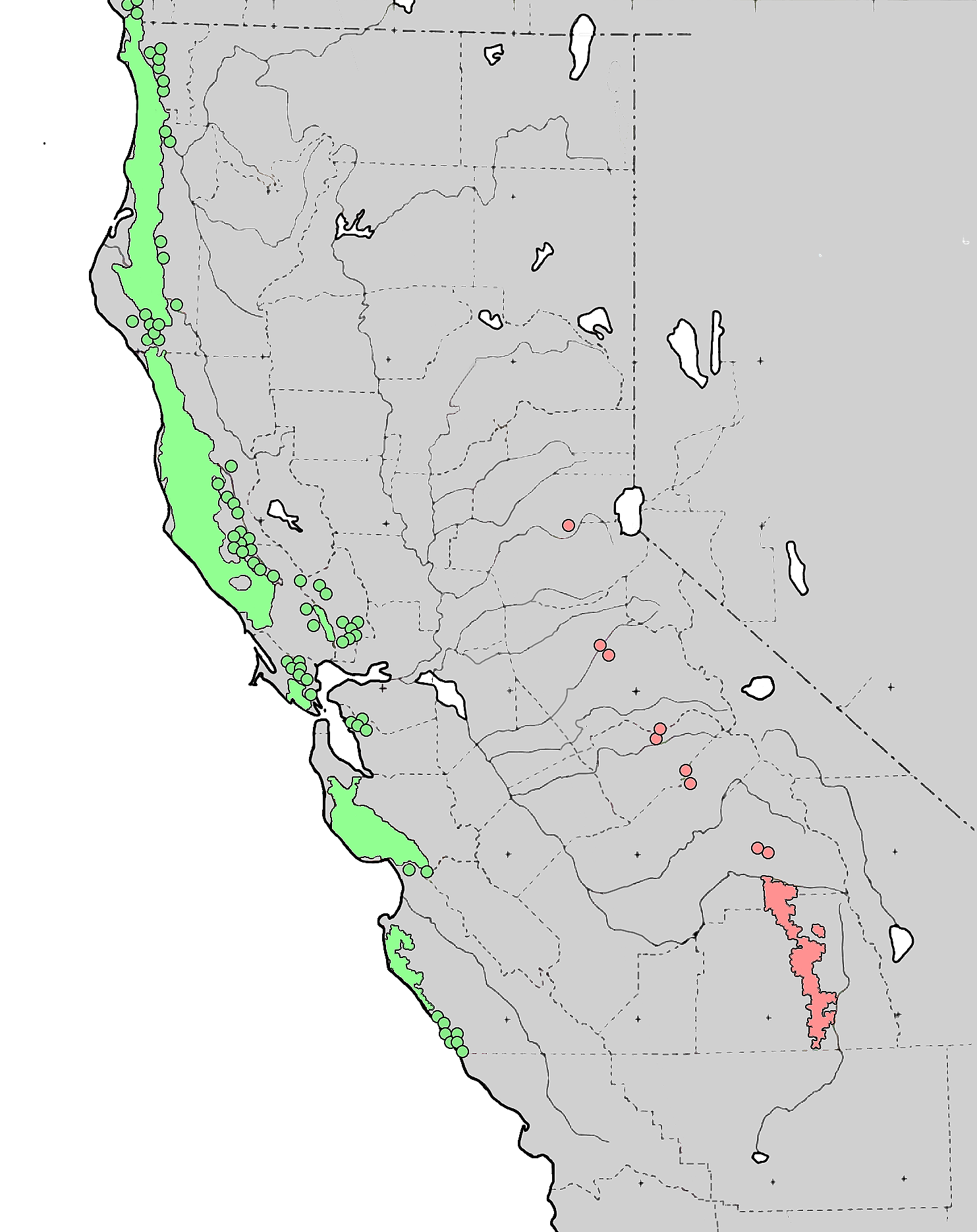
- Natural ranges of Sequoia and Sequiodendron green – Sequoia sempervirens red – Sequoiadendron giganteum

Synonyms
- Condylocarpus Salisb. ex Lamb.; Gigantabies J.Nelson

= Sequoia (genus) =

Sequoia Temporal range: Middle Jurassic – Present

Genus of coniferous trees

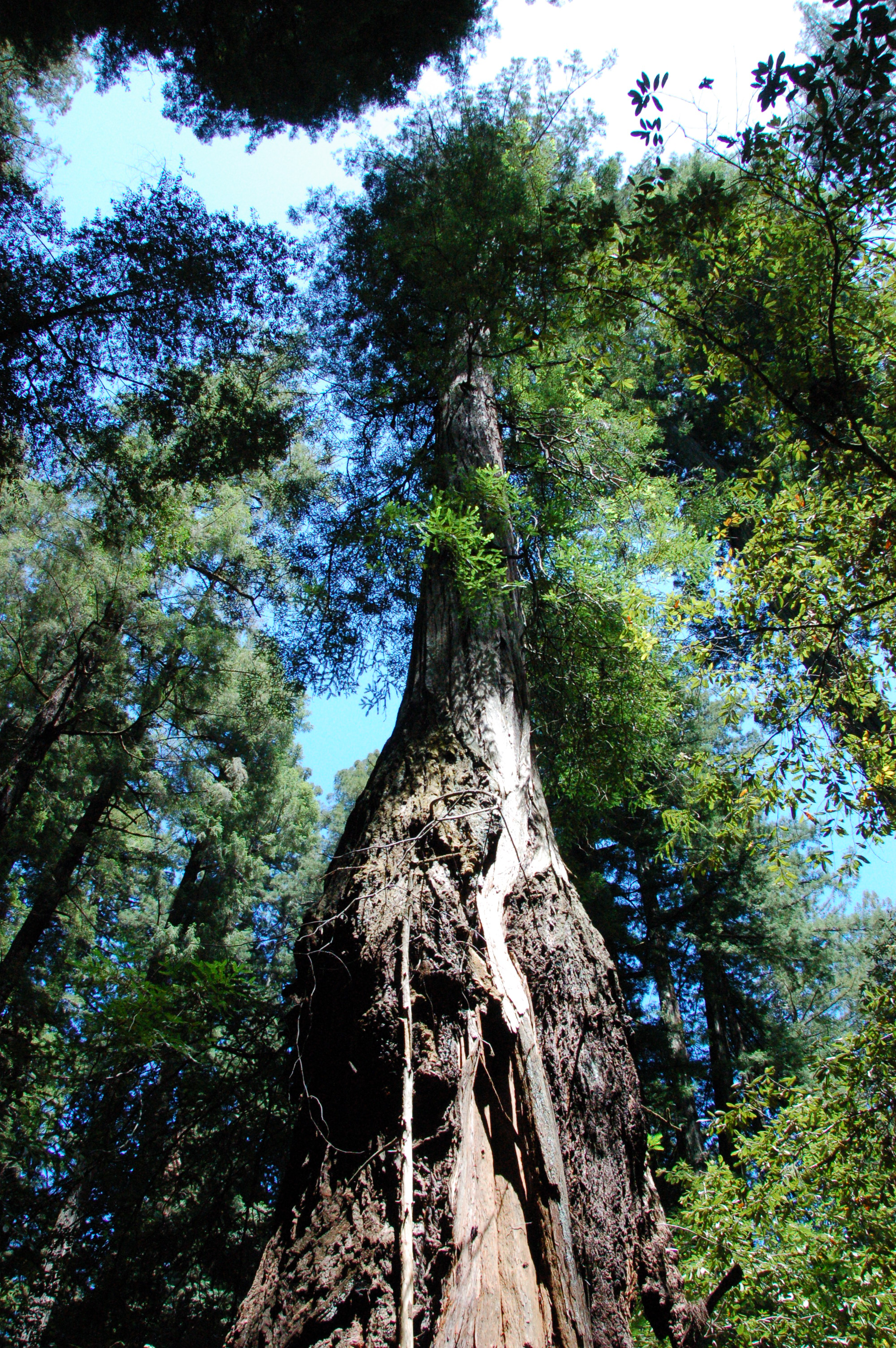
"Icicle Tree" showing burling of the trunk

Sequoia is a genus of redwood coniferous trees in the subfamily Sequoioideae of the family Cupressaceae. The only extant species of the genus is Sequoia sempervirens in the Northern California coastal forests ecoregion of Northern California and Southwestern Oregon in the United States. The two other genera in the subfamily Sequoioideae, Sequoiadendron and Metasequoia, are closely related to Sequoia. It includes the tallest trees, as well as the heaviest, in the world.

Several extinct species have been named from fossils, including Sequoia affinis (Western North America) and Sequoia magnifica (petrified wood from the Yellowstone National Park area).

== Etymology ==
The name Sequoia was first published as a genus name by the Austrian botanist Stephan Endlicher in 1847. However, he left no specific reasons for choosing that name, and there is no record of anyone else speaking to him about its origin.

Beginning in the 1860s, it was suggested that the name is a derivation from the Latin word for "sequence", since the species was thought to be a follower or remnant of massive ancient, extinct species, and thus the next in a sequence.

However, in a 2012 article, author Gary Lowe argues that Endlicher would not have had the knowledge to conceive of Sequoia sempervirens as the successor to a fossil sequence, and that he more likely saw it, within the framework of his taxonomic arrangements, as completing a morphological sequence of species in regards to the number of seeds per cone scale.

In 2017, Nancy Muleady-Mecham of Northern Arizona University, after extensive research with original documents in Austria, claimed to find a positive link to the person Sequoyah (the inventor of the Cherokee writing system) and Endlicher, as well as information that the use of the Latin sequor would not have been correct. However there are debilitating limitations to the arguments presented in the 2017 article. The alleged positive link is based on a similarity in pronunciation of the words "Sequoyah" and "Sequoia": valid to persons who think in English, but not those that think in German or Latin. Endlicher could not have known how Sequoyah's name was pronounced in Cherokee since he did not have the opportunity to hear spoken Cherokee. The claimed use of Latin ignores Endlicher's philological background and familiarity with the Latin of the ancient manuscripts in the royal library on which he extensively published. Endlicher's Botanical Latin prefix in the genus name Sequoia was probably derived from the Latin verb sequor, and was not a conjugation of the verb.

== Paleontology ==
Sequoia jeholensis is the oldest recorded member of the genus Sequoia (along with Sequoia portlandica, but this name is a nomen dubium), known from the Jiufotang Formation (Lower Cretaceous) and the Jiulongshan Formation (Middle Jurassic) of China. By the late Cretaceous the ancestral sequoias were established in Europe, parts of China, and western North America. Comparisons among fossils and modern organisms suggest that by this period Sequoia ancestors had already evolved a greater tracheid diameter that allowed it to reach the great heights characteristic of the modern Sequoia sempervirens (coast redwood) and Sequoiadendron giganteum (giant sequoia).

Sequoia ancestors were not dominant in the tropical high northern latitudes, like Metasequoia, a redwood whose deciduous habit gave it a significant adaptive advantage in an environment with 3 months of continuous darkness. However, there still was possibly prolonged range overlap between Sequoia and Metasequoia which could have led to hybridization events that created the modern hexaploid Sequoia sempervirens. See also the metastudy of the geologic history of the giant sequoia and the coast redwood.

A general cooling trend by the late Eocene and Oligocene reduced the northern ranges of ancestral Sequoia. By the end of the Miocene and beginning of the Pliocene, Sequoia fossils were morphologically identical to the modern Sequoia sempervirens. Continued cooling in the Pliocene meant that Sequoia, which is extremely intolerant to frost due to the high water content of its tissues, also became locally extinct in response to the extreme cooling of Europe and Asia. Pollen sampling of sediments found in Hungary indicates the local extinction of genus Sequoia approximately 2.7 million years ago in the first part of the Pliocene. In western North America it continued to move south through coastal Oregon and California, surviving due to the abundant rainfall and mild seasons. The Sierra Nevada orogeny further isolated Sequoia because the snowy mountain peaks prevented eastward expansion. The Pleistocene and Holocene distributions are likely nearly identical to the modern S. sempervirens distributions.

A number of fossil taxa originally named as Sequoia species have subsequently been reidentified into other genera.

- †Sequoia chinensis China – Moved to Metasequoia chinensis
- †Sequoia couttsiae Europe – Moved to Quasisequoia couttsiae
- †Sequoia dakotensis South Dakota (Maastrichtian) – Moved to Sequoites dakotensis (possibly a species of Metasequoia)
- †Sequoia langsdorfii Europe – Moved to Metasequoia langsdorfii
- †Sequoia reichenbachi Europe – Moved to Metasequoia reichenbachii

== See also ==
- Muir Woods National Monument
- Pacific temperate rain forests
- Redwood National and State Parks
- macOS Sequoia
