= 1998 in paleontology =

Paleontology or palaeontology is the study of prehistoric life forms on Earth through the examination of plant and animal fossils. This includes the study of body fossils, tracks (ichnites), burrows, cast-off parts, fossilised feces (coprolites), palynomorphs and chemical residues. Because humans have encountered fossils for millennia, paleontology has a long history both before and after becoming formalized as a science. This article records significant discoveries and events related to paleontology that occurred or were published in the year 1998.

== Flora ==
=== Lycophytes ===
==== Lycophyte research ====
- Wehr (1998) reports, without description, Selaginella species spikemoss fossils occurring in the Eocene Okanagan Highlands Klondike Mountain Formation.

=== Angiosperms ===
Name	Novelty	Status	Authors	Age	Type locality	Location	Notes	Images
Palaeocarpinus pacifica	Sp nov	Valid	Manchester & Chen	Paleocene; Danian	Malo-Mikhailovka Formation	Russia	A betulaceous fruit	

== Fungi ==
Name	Novelty	Status	Authors	Age	Type locality	Country	Notes	Images
Cryptodidymosphaerites	Gen et sp nov	valid	Currah, Stockey, & LePage	Eocene; Ypresian	Allenby Formation; Princeton Chert	Canada; British Columbia	A hyperparasitic pleosporalean fungus of uncertain family affinity. The type species is C. princetonensis Its hosted by the phyllachoralean fungus Palaeoserenomyces allenbyensis	
Palaeoserenomyces	Gen et sp nov	valid	Currah, Stockey, & LePage	Eocene; Ypresian	Allenby Formation; Princeton Chert	Canada; British Columbia	A parasitic phyllachoralean fungus of uncertain family affinity. The type species is P. allenbyensis Its hosted by the fan palm Uhlia allenbyensis. Its hyperparasitized by Cryptodidymosphaerites princetonensis	

=== Fungal research ===
- Currah, Stockey, & LePage (1998) describe the a phyllachoralean "tar spot" parasitizing Uhlia palm leaves, and host for a hyperparasitic pleosporalean fungus. They note them to be one of the first occurrences of hyperparasitic relationships in the fossil record.

== Arthropods ==
=== Newly named crustaceans ===
Name	Novelty	Status	Authors	Age	Unit	Location	Notes	Images
Ursquilla	Gen nov	Valid	Hof	Late Cretaceous (Campanian)	Mishash Formation; Amman Silicified Limestone Formation	Israel Jordan	A mantis shrimp, type species is U. yehoachi (originally named as Eryon yehoachi in 1955).	
Tyrannophontes acanthocercus	Sp nov	Jr synonym	Jenner, Hof & Schram	Serpukhovian	Bear Gulch Limestone	USA	A mantis shrimp, moved to the genus Daidal (2007)	

=== Newly named insects ===
Name	Novelty	Status	Authors	Age	Unit	Location	Notes	Images
Acanthostichus hispaniolicus	Sp. nov	Valid	De Andrade	Burdigalian	Dominican amber	Dominican Republic	A Dorylinae ant	Acanthostichus hispaniolicus
Aquarius lunpolaensis	Comb nov.	valid	(Lin) Andersen	Miocene	Lunpola Basin	China	A water strider Moved from Gerris lunpolaensis	
Carabus neli	Sp nov.	valid	Deuve	Turolian	Montagne d'Andance	France	A ground beetle	Carabus neli
Cylindromyrmex antillanus	Sp. nov	Valid	De Andrade	Burdigalian	Dominican amber	Dominican Republic	A Dorylinae ant	Cylindromyrmex antillanus
Daniavelia	Gen et sp nov.	valid	Andersen	Eocene; Ypresian	MØclay; Fur Formation	Denmark	A macroveliid water strider The type species is D. morsensis	
Electrovelia	Gen et sp nov.	valid	Andersen	Eocene; Lutetian	Baltic Amber	Denmark	A riffle bug The type species is P. baltica	
Eocenometra longicomis	Sp nov.	valid	Andersen	Eocene; Ypresian	MØclay; 0lst/Fur Formations	Denmark	A marsh treader	
Ledouxnebria	Gen et sp nov.	valid	Deuve	Turolian	Montagne d'Andance	France	A ground beetle	Ledouxnebria brisaci
Limnoporus wilsoni	Sp nov.	valid	Andersen	Eocene; Ypresian	Okanagan Highlands; Driftwood shales	Canada; British Columbia	A water strider	
Palaeogerris	Gen et 3 sp nov.	valid	Andersen	Eocene; Ypresian	MØ clay 0lst/Fur Formations	Denmark	A water strider The type species is P. furensis Also includes P. grandis & P. mikkelseni	
Palaeometra	Gen et sp nov.	valid	Andersen	Eocene; Ypresian	Fur Formation	Denmark	A limnobatodine water strider The type species is P. madseni	
Telmatrechus defunctus	Comb nov.	valid	(Handlirsch) Andersen	Eocene; Ypresian	Okanagan Highlands; Quilchena site	Canada; British Columbia	A water strider Moved from Gerris defuncta (1910)	

== Brachiopods ==
Name	Novelty	Status	Authors	Age	Type locality	Country	Notes	Images
Iridistrophia aliciae	Sp nov	valid	Herrera, Salas & Giolitti	Early Devonian	Talacasto Formation	Argentina	A species of Iridistrophia	
Iridistrophia dominans	Sp nov	valid	Herrera, Salas & Giolitti	Early Devonian	Talacasto Formation	Argentina	A species of Iridistrophia	
Iridistrophia magna	Sp nov	valid	Herrera, Salas & Giolitti	Early Devonian	Talacasto Formation	Argentina	A species of Iridistrophia	
Iridistrophia prima	Sp nov	valid	Herrera, Salas & Giolitti	Early Devonian	Talacasto Formation	Argentina	A species of Iridistrophia	
Eoschuchertella delicata	Sp nov	valid	Herrera, Salas & Giolitti	Early Devonian	Talacasto Formation	Argentina	A species of Eoschuchertella	

== Molluscs ==
=== Bivalves ===
Name	Novelty	Status	Authors	Age	Unit	Location	Notes	Images
Pojetaia sarhroensis	sp nov	Valid	Geyer & Streng	Early Cambrian	Anti-Atlas mountains	Morocco	Early Cambrian Fordillidae bivalve	

== Echinoderms ==
Name	Novelty	Status	Authors	Age	Unit	Location	Notes	Images
Alkaidia	Gen et sp nov	Valid	Blake & Reid	Early Cretaceous (Albian)	Del Rio Formation; Paw Paw Formation; Main Street Formation; Grayson Formation	USA (Texas)	A starfish, type species is A. sumralli.	
Altairia	Gen et comb nov	Valid	Blake & Reid	Early Cretaceous (Albian)	Paw Paw Formation	USA (Texas)	A starfish, type species is A. wintoni, originally named as Comptonia wintoni in 1920.	
Betelgeusia	Gen et sp nov	Valid	Blake & Reid	Early Cretaceous (Albian)	Del Rio Formation; Paw Paw Formation; Grayson Formation	USA (Texas)	A starfish, type species is B. reidi.	
Capellia	Gen et sp nov	Valid	Blake & Reid	Early Cretaceous (Albian)	Paw Paw Formation	USA (Texas)	A starfish, type species is C. mauricei.	
Crateraster texensis	Comb nov	Valid	Blake & Reid	Early Cretaceous (Albian)	Paw Paw Formation; Weno Formation	USA (Texas)	A starfish, originally named as Pentagonaster texensis in 1920.	
Denebia	Gen et comb nov	Valid	Blake & Reid	Early Cretaceous (Albian)	Paw Paw Formation; Weno Formation	USA (Texas)	A starfish, type species is D. americana, originally named as Pentaceros americanus in 1920.	
Fomalhautia	Gen et comb nov	Valid	Blake & Reid	Early Cretaceous (Albian)	Paw Paw Formation	USA (Texas)	A starfish, type species is F. hortensae, originally named as Metopaster hortensae in 1920.	

== Amphibians ==
=== newly named anurans ===
Name	Novelty	Status	Authors	Age	Unit	Location	Notes	Images
Rhadinosteus	Gen et sp nov	Valid	Henrici	Kimmeridgian	Morrison Formation	USA	A possible Rhinophrynidae frog	

== Archosauromorpha ==
=== Dinosaurs ===
- A paper in the journal Nature is published by Karen Chin and others announcing the earlier discovery of a "king-sized coprolite" attributed to Tyrannosaurus rex.
- Lourinhasaurus gastroliths documented.
- Cedarosaurus gastroliths documented.
- Caudipteryx gastroliths documented.
- Volunteers from the Denver Museum of Natural History discovered Tony's Bone Bed in the Cedar Mountain Formation's Poison Strip Member.

Data courtesy of George Olshevsky's dinosaur genera list.

Name	Status	Authors		Location	Notes	Images
Altirhinus	Valid taxon	David Norman		Mongolia		Caudipteryx Cristatusaurus Gargoyleosaurus Gastonia Lourinhanosaurus Megaraptor Rahonavis Scipionyx Shuvuuia Suchomimus Tianzhenosaurus Variraptor Zuniceratops
''Augustia''	Preoccupied	Bonaparte; Zariquiey				Caudipteryx Cristatusaurus Gargoyleosaurus Gastonia Lourinhanosaurus Megaraptor Rahonavis Scipionyx Shuvuuia Suchomimus Tianzhenosaurus Variraptor Zuniceratops
Camposaurus	Valid taxon	Hunt, Lucas, Heckert,	Sullivan, and; Lockley			Caudipteryx Cristatusaurus Gargoyleosaurus Gastonia Lourinhanosaurus Megaraptor Rahonavis Scipionyx Shuvuuia Suchomimus Tianzhenosaurus Variraptor Zuniceratops
Caseosaurus	Valid taxon	Hunt, Lucas, Heckert,	Sullivan, and; Lockley	USA (New Mexico and Texas)		Caudipteryx Cristatusaurus Gargoyleosaurus Gastonia Lourinhanosaurus Megaraptor Rahonavis Scipionyx Shuvuuia Suchomimus Tianzhenosaurus Variraptor Zuniceratops
Caudipteryx	Valid taxon	Ji Q., Phillip Currie,	Mark Norell and; Ji S.	China		Caudipteryx Cristatusaurus Gargoyleosaurus Gastonia Lourinhanosaurus Megaraptor Rahonavis Scipionyx Shuvuuia Suchomimus Tianzhenosaurus Variraptor Zuniceratops
Cristatusaurus	Valid taxon	Philippe Taquet	Dale A. Russell			Caudipteryx Cristatusaurus Gargoyleosaurus Gastonia Lourinhanosaurus Megaraptor Rahonavis Scipionyx Shuvuuia Suchomimus Tianzhenosaurus Variraptor Zuniceratops
Eobrontosaurus	Valid taxon. Now Synonym of Brontosaurus	Robert Bakker				Caudipteryx Cristatusaurus Gargoyleosaurus Gastonia Lourinhanosaurus Megaraptor Rahonavis Scipionyx Shuvuuia Suchomimus Tianzhenosaurus Variraptor Zuniceratops
Eolambia	Valid taxon	James Kirkland		USA (Utah)		Caudipteryx Cristatusaurus Gargoyleosaurus Gastonia Lourinhanosaurus Megaraptor Rahonavis Scipionyx Shuvuuia Suchomimus Tianzhenosaurus Variraptor Zuniceratops
Gargoyleosaurus	Valid taxon	Kenneth Carpenter; Miles	Cloward	USA (Wyoming)		Caudipteryx Cristatusaurus Gargoyleosaurus Gastonia Lourinhanosaurus Megaraptor Rahonavis Scipionyx Shuvuuia Suchomimus Tianzhenosaurus Variraptor Zuniceratops
Gastonia	Valid taxon	James Kirkland		USA (Utah)		Caudipteryx Cristatusaurus Gargoyleosaurus Gastonia Lourinhanosaurus Megaraptor Rahonavis Scipionyx Shuvuuia Suchomimus Tianzhenosaurus Variraptor Zuniceratops
Gongxianosaurus	Valid taxon	He, Wang C., Liu S., Zhou F.,	Liu T., Cai and; Dai	China		Caudipteryx Cristatusaurus Gargoyleosaurus Gastonia Lourinhanosaurus Megaraptor Rahonavis Scipionyx Shuvuuia Suchomimus Tianzhenosaurus Variraptor Zuniceratops
Histriasaurus	Valid taxon	Dalla Vecchia		Croatia		Caudipteryx Cristatusaurus Gargoyleosaurus Gastonia Lourinhanosaurus Megaraptor Rahonavis Scipionyx Shuvuuia Suchomimus Tianzhenosaurus Variraptor Zuniceratops
Lourinhanosaurus	Valid taxon	Mateus		Portugal		Caudipteryx Cristatusaurus Gargoyleosaurus Gastonia Lourinhanosaurus Megaraptor Rahonavis Scipionyx Shuvuuia Suchomimus Tianzhenosaurus Variraptor Zuniceratops
Lourinhasaurus	Valid taxon	Dantas, Sanz, Da Silva,	Ortega, Dos Santos and; Cachao	Portugal		Caudipteryx Cristatusaurus Gargoyleosaurus Gastonia Lourinhanosaurus Megaraptor Rahonavis Scipionyx Shuvuuia Suchomimus Tianzhenosaurus Variraptor Zuniceratops
Megaraptor	Valid taxon	Novas		Argentina		Caudipteryx Cristatusaurus Gargoyleosaurus Gastonia Lourinhanosaurus Megaraptor Rahonavis Scipionyx Shuvuuia Suchomimus Tianzhenosaurus Variraptor Zuniceratops
Nedcolbertia	Valid taxon	James Kirkland, Britt, Whittle,	S. K. Madsen and; Burge	USA (Utah)		Caudipteryx Cristatusaurus Gargoyleosaurus Gastonia Lourinhanosaurus Megaraptor Rahonavis Scipionyx Shuvuuia Suchomimus Tianzhenosaurus Variraptor Zuniceratops
Notohypsilophodon	Valid taxon	Martínez		Argentina		Caudipteryx Cristatusaurus Gargoyleosaurus Gastonia Lourinhanosaurus Megaraptor Rahonavis Scipionyx Shuvuuia Suchomimus Tianzhenosaurus Variraptor Zuniceratops
Ozraptor	Valid taxon	J. A. Long and	Ralph Molnar	Australia		Caudipteryx Cristatusaurus Gargoyleosaurus Gastonia Lourinhanosaurus Megaraptor Rahonavis Scipionyx Shuvuuia Suchomimus Tianzhenosaurus Variraptor Zuniceratops
Protohadros	Valid taxon	Head		USA (Texas)		Caudipteryx Cristatusaurus Gargoyleosaurus Gastonia Lourinhanosaurus Megaraptor Rahonavis Scipionyx Shuvuuia Suchomimus Tianzhenosaurus Variraptor Zuniceratops
''Rahona''	Preoccupied	Forster; Sampson	Luis M. Chiappe and; Krause			Caudipteryx Cristatusaurus Gargoyleosaurus Gastonia Lourinhanosaurus Megaraptor Rahonavis Scipionyx Shuvuuia Suchomimus Tianzhenosaurus Variraptor Zuniceratops
Rahonavis	Valid taxon	Forster, Sampson,	Luis M. Chiappe and; Krause	Madagascar		Caudipteryx Cristatusaurus Gargoyleosaurus Gastonia Lourinhanosaurus Megaraptor Rahonavis Scipionyx Shuvuuia Suchomimus Tianzhenosaurus Variraptor Zuniceratops
Scipionyx	Valid taxon	Dal Sasso and	Signore	Italy		Caudipteryx Cristatusaurus Gargoyleosaurus Gastonia Lourinhanosaurus Megaraptor Rahonavis Scipionyx Shuvuuia Suchomimus Tianzhenosaurus Variraptor Zuniceratops
Shanxia	Valid taxon	Barrett, You,	Upchurch and; Burton	China		Caudipteryx Cristatusaurus Gargoyleosaurus Gastonia Lourinhanosaurus Megaraptor Rahonavis Scipionyx Shuvuuia Suchomimus Tianzhenosaurus Variraptor Zuniceratops
Shuvuuia	Valid taxon	Luis M. Chiappe, Mark Norell and	Clark	Mongolia		Caudipteryx Cristatusaurus Gargoyleosaurus Gastonia Lourinhanosaurus Megaraptor Rahonavis Scipionyx Shuvuuia Suchomimus Tianzhenosaurus Variraptor Zuniceratops
Sonorasaurus	Valid taxon	Ratkevich, Sidor, Varricchio,	G. P. Wilson and; Jeffrey A. Wilson.	USA (Arizona)		Caudipteryx Cristatusaurus Gargoyleosaurus Gastonia Lourinhanosaurus Megaraptor Rahonavis Scipionyx Shuvuuia Suchomimus Tianzhenosaurus Variraptor Zuniceratops
Suchomimus	Valid taxon	An African spinosaurs	Sereno et al. 1998	Niger		Caudipteryx Cristatusaurus Gargoyleosaurus Gastonia Lourinhanosaurus Megaraptor Rahonavis Scipionyx Shuvuuia Suchomimus Tianzhenosaurus Variraptor Zuniceratops
Tianzhenosaurus	Valid taxon	Pang and	Cheng Z.	China		Caudipteryx Cristatusaurus Gargoyleosaurus Gastonia Lourinhanosaurus Megaraptor Rahonavis Scipionyx Shuvuuia Suchomimus Tianzhenosaurus Variraptor Zuniceratops
Variraptor	Valid taxon	Le Loeuff and	Buffetaut	France		Caudipteryx Cristatusaurus Gargoyleosaurus Gastonia Lourinhanosaurus Megaraptor Rahonavis Scipionyx Shuvuuia Suchomimus Tianzhenosaurus Variraptor Zuniceratops
Zuniceratops	Valid taxon	Wolfe and	James Kirkland	USA (New Mexico)		Caudipteryx Cristatusaurus Gargoyleosaurus Gastonia Lourinhanosaurus Megaraptor Rahonavis Scipionyx Shuvuuia Suchomimus Tianzhenosaurus Variraptor Zuniceratops

=== Newly named birds ===
Name	Novelty	Status	Authors	Age	Unit	Location	Notes	Images
Abavornis bonapartei	Gen. nov. et Sp. nov.	Valid	Andrei V. Panteleyev	Late Cretaceous	Coniacian, Bissekty Formation	Uzbekistan	An Alexornithidae Brodkorb, 1976, this is the type species of the new genus.	
Actitis balcanica	Sp. nov.	Valid ?	Zlatozar N. Boev	Late Pliocene	MN 17	Bulgaria	A Scolopacidae?, the holotypical tarsometatarsus looks more like a Charadriidae.	
Aizenogyps toomeyae	Gen. nov. et Sp. nov.	Valid	Steven D. Emslie	Late Pliocene	Late Blancan	USA: Florida	A Cathartidae, this is the type species of the new genus.	
Anhinga beckeri	Sp. nov.	Valid	Steven D. Emslie	Early Pliocene	Late-Early Irvingtonian	USA: Florida	An Anhingidae.	
Basityto rummeli	Gen. nov. et Sp. nov.	Valid	Jiří Mlíkovský	Early Miocene	MN 2-3	Germany: Bavaria	A Gruidae, transferred to the genus Balearica by Mourer-Chauviré in 2001, this is the type species of the new genus.	
Buteo sanya	Sp. nov.	Valid	Hou Lianhai	Late Pleistocene	Cave Deposits	China	An Accipitridae.	
Buteo spassovi	Sp. nov.	Valid	Zlatozar N. Boev	Late Miocene	MN 11-12	Bulgaria	An Accipitridae.	
Catenoleimus anachoretus	Gen. nov. et Sp. nov.	Valid	Andrei V. Panteleyev	Late Cretaceous	Coniacian	Uzbekistan	An Enantiornithes Walker, 1981, Euenantiornithes Incertae Sedis, this is the type species of the new genus.	
Chloephaga robusta	Sp. nov.	Valid	Claudia P. Tambussi	Middle-Late Pliocene	Irene Formation	Argentina	An Anatidae.	
Coccothraustes balcanicus	Sp. nov.	Valid	Zlatozar N. Boev	Late Pliocene	MN 18	Bulgaria	A Fringillidae.	
Coccothraustes simeonovi	Sp. nov.	Valid	Zlatozar N. Boev	Late Pliocene	MN 17	Bulgaria	A Fringillidae.	
Diamantornis spaggiarii	Sp. nov.	Valid	Brigitte Senut Yannicke Dauphin Martin Pickford	Early Middle Miocene	Karingarab	Namibia	A Struthionidae, eggshells.	
Explorornis nessovi	Gen. nov. et Sp. nov.	Valid	Andrei V. Panteleyev	Late Cretaceous	Coniacian, Bissekty Formation	Uzbekistan	An Alexornithidae Brodkorb, 1976, this is the type species of the new genus.	
Gargantuavis philoinos	Gen. nov. et Sp. nov.	Valid	Eric Buffetaut Jean Le Loeuff	Late Cretaceous	Late Campanian-Early Maastrichtian, Marnes de la Maurine Formation	France	An Ornithothoraces, this is the type species of the new genus.	
Gavia schultzi	Sp. nov.	Valid	Jiří Mlíkovský	Middle Miocene	MN 7	Austria: Burgenland	A Gaviidae.	
Geronticus balcanicus	Sp. nov.	Valid	Zlatozar N. Boev	Late Pliocene, MN 18	Slivnica	Bulgaria	A Threskiornithidae.	
Glaucidium explorator	Sp. nov.	Valid	Steven D. Emslie	Late Pliocene	Florida	USA: Florida	A Strigidae.	
Gracilitarsus mirabilis	Gen. nov. et Sp. nov.	Valid	Gerald Mayr	Middle Eocene	Messel pit, MP 11	Germany: Hessen	A Piciformes, Gracilitarsidae G. Mayr, 2001, this is the type species of the new genus.	
Hassiavis laticauda	Gen. nov. et Sp. nov.	Valid	Gerald Mayr	Middle Eocene	Messel pit, MP 11	Germany: Hessen	An Apodiformes, ?Archaeotrogonidae Mourer-Chauviré, 1980, this is the type species of the new genus.	
Incolornis silvae	Gen. nov. et Sp. nov.	Valid	Andrei V. Panteleyev	Late Cretaceous	Coniacian, Bissekty Formation	Uzbekistan	An Alexornithidae Brodkorb, 1976, this is the type species of the new genus.	
Intulula tinnipara	Gen. nov. et Sp. nov.	Valid	Jirí Mlíkovský	Early Miocene	MN 2a	Czech Republic; Germany: Bavaria	A Strigidae, this is the type species of the new genus.	
Masillacolius brevidactylus	Gen. nov. et Sp. nov.	Valid	Gerald Mayr Dieter S. Peters	Middle Eocene	Messel pit, MP 11	Germany: Hessen	A Coliidae, this is the type species of the new genus.	
Messelirrisor halcyrostris	Sp. nov.	Valid	Gerald Mayr	Middle Eocene	Messel pit, MP 11	Germany: Hessen	An Upupiformes, Laurillardiidae Harrison, 1979.	
Messelirrisor parvus	Gen. nov. et Sp. nov.	Valid	Gerald Mayr	Middle Eocene	Messel pit, MP 11	Germany: Hessen	An Upupiformes, Laurillardiidae Harrison, 1979, this is the type species of the new genus.	
Mioglaux debellatrix	Gen. nov. et Sp. nov.	Valid	Jirí Mlíkovský	Early Miocene	MN 3	Czech Republic	A Strigidae, this is the type species of the new genus.	
Miopico benimellalensis	Gen. nov. et Sp. nov.	Valid	Gerald Mayr	Middle Miocene	Beni Mellal	Morocco	A Miopiconidae G. Mayr, 1998, this is the type species of the new genus.	
Palaelodus pledgei	Sp. nov.	Valid	Robert F. Baird Patricia Vickers Rich	Late Oligocene - Middle Miocene	Etadunna Formation	Australia: South Australia	A Phoenicopteriformes, Palaelodidae Stejneger, 1885.	
Palaelodus wilsoni	Sp. nov.	Valid	Robert F. Baird Patricia Vickers Rich	Late Oligocene - Middle Miocene	Etadunna Formation	Australia: South Australia	A Phoenicopteriformes, Palaelodidae Stejneger, 1885.	
?Primozygodactylus ballmanni	Sp. nov.	Valid	Gerald Mayr	Middle Eocene	Messel pit, MP 11	Germany: Hessen	A Zygodactylidae Brodkorb, 1971, not surely a Primozygodactylus.	
Primozygodactylus danielsi	Gen. nov. et Sp. nov.	Valid	Gerald Mayr	Middle Eocene	Messel pit, MP 11	Germany: Hessen	A Zygodactylidae Brodkorb, 1971, this is the type species of the new genus.	
Primozygodactylus major	Sp. nov.	Valid	Gerald Mayr	Middle Eocene	Messel pit, MP 11	Germany: Hessen	A Zygodactylidae Brodkorb, 1971.	
Pseudastur macrocephalus	Gen. nov. et Sp. nov.	Valid	Gerald Mayr	Middle Eocene	Messel pit, MP 11	Germany: Hessen	A Halcyornithidae Harrison et Walker, 1972. The genus Pseudastur is preoccupied and replaced by Pseudasturides Mayr, 2004, this is the type species of both genera.	
Psittacopes lepidus	Gen. nov. et Sp. nov.	Valid	Gerald Mayr ppMichael Daniels	Middle Eocene	Messel pit, MP 11	Germany: Hessen	A stem Psittaciformes, this is the type species of the new genus.	
Quasisyndactylus longibrachis	Gen. nov. et Sp. nov.	Valid	Gerald Mayr	Middle Eocene	Messel pit, MP 11	Germany: Hessen	An Alcediniformes Incertae Sedis, this is the type species of the new genus.	
Rostratula pulia	Sp. nov.	Valid	Jíří Mlíkovský	Early Miocene	MN 4b	Czech Republic	A Rostratulidae.	
Scolopax hutchensi	Sp. nov.	Valid	Steven D. Emslie	Late Pliocene	Florida	USA: Florida	A Scolopacidae.	
Struthio karingarabensis	Sp. nov.	Valid	Brigitte Senut Yannicke Dauphin Martin Pickford	Early Miocene	Karingarab	Namibia	A Struthionidae, eggshells.	
Tetrao rhodopensis	Sp. nov.	Valid	Zlatozar N. Boev	Early Pliocene	MN 14	Bulgaria	A Phasianidae.	
Xenopsitta fejfari	Gen. nov. et Sp. nov.	Valid	Jiří Mlíkovský	Early Miocene	MN 3	Czech Republic	A Psittacidae, this is the type species of the new genus.	

== Pterosaurs ==
=== New taxa ===
Name	Status	Authors	Notes
"Dendrorhynchus"	Valid	Ji S.-A. Ji Q.	
Normannognathus	Valid	Buffetaut Lepage, J.-J. Lepage, G.	
