= Quatsinoporites =

Quatsinoporites Temporal range: Barremian

Scientific classification
- Kingdom: Fungi
- Division: Basidiomycota
- Class: Agaricomycetes
- Order: Hymenochaetales
- Family: Hymenochaetaceae
- Genus: †Quatsinoporites; S.Y.Smith, Currah & Stockey (2004)
- Species: †Q. cranhamii

Binomial name
- †Quatsinoporites cranhamii S.Y.Smith, Currah & Stockey (2004)

Extinct genus of fungi

Quatsinoporites is an extinct monotypic genus of agaricomycete fungus in the Agaricomycetes family Hymenochaetaceae. At present it contains the single species Quatsinoporites cranhamii.

The genus is solely known from the Barremian aged, Apple Bay deposits of northwestern Vancouver Island. Quatsinoporites is one of only three known fossil fungus species found on Vancouver Island and the only to be described from the Apple Bay strata. The agaricomycete Appianoporites vancouverensis was described from an Eocene fossil at the same time as Quatsinoporites , while a third fungus, Margaretbarromyces dictyosporus, was described three years later.

== History and classification ==
The genus is known only from the single holotype, a partial bracket fungus fruiting body, or "conk." The specimen, P13021 E, is currently residing in the paleobotanical collections housed by the University of Alberta, Edmonton, Alberta, Canada. The specimen was collected in Apple Bay, near Quatsino Sound on the northwestern shore of Vancouver Island, British Columbia, Canada. The partial conk was preserved in a calcareous nodule recovered from a Greywacke sandstone matrix equivalent in age to the Longarm Formation. The nodules formed in a shallow marine environment along with abundant plant material.

It was first studied by a group of researchers consisting of Selena Smith, Randolph Currah and Ruth Stockey, all from the University of Alberta. Smith and colleagues published their 2004 type description in the journal Mycologia volume 96. The generic epithet Quatsinoporites coined from a combination of Quatsino in reference to the nearness of the type locality to Quatsino Sound and "porites" to reflect that it is a polypore fungus. The specific epithet "cranhamii" chosen in honor of Gerald Cranham in recognition of his contribution of a number of Vancouver Island plant fossils to the University of Alberta for study.

When first described Quatsinoporites cranhamii was the first fungus species to be described from Vancouver Island and the third from British Columbia. Cryptodidymosphaerites princetonensis and Palaeoserenomyces allenbyensis were the first fossil fungi to be described from British Columbia, known only from the Early Eocene Allenby Formation near Princeton, B.C. Appianoporites vancouverensis, an Eocene age agaricomycete, was described in the same paper from deposits along Appian Way on the eastern shore of Vancouver Island. Three years later the ascomycete Margaretbarromyces dictyosporus was also described from the Appian Way site.

== Description ==
The holotype of Quatsinoporites is a lone fragment of fruiting body 5.0 millimetres (0.20 in) by 2.0 millimetres (0.079 in) and 3.0 millimetres (0.12 in) deep, which was abraded by water transport before preservation in a calcareous nodule. The conk section has an average of three, 130 to 540 μm diameter tubes per millimeter. The fungus is composed of monomitic hyphae. Due to the abraded nature of the specimen the basidia and basidiospores are both unknown at this time. The specimen was studied by cutting the calcareous nodule into slices with a rock saw and using the cellulose acetate peel technique to create slides that were examined under stereo microscope.

Quatsinoporites is placed in Hymenochaetaceae based on the structure of the poroid hymenophore, the presence of setae and monomitic hyphal system lacking clamp connections. This placement is tentative due to limited characters available in the fossil the lack of diagnostic features such as the basidiospores.
