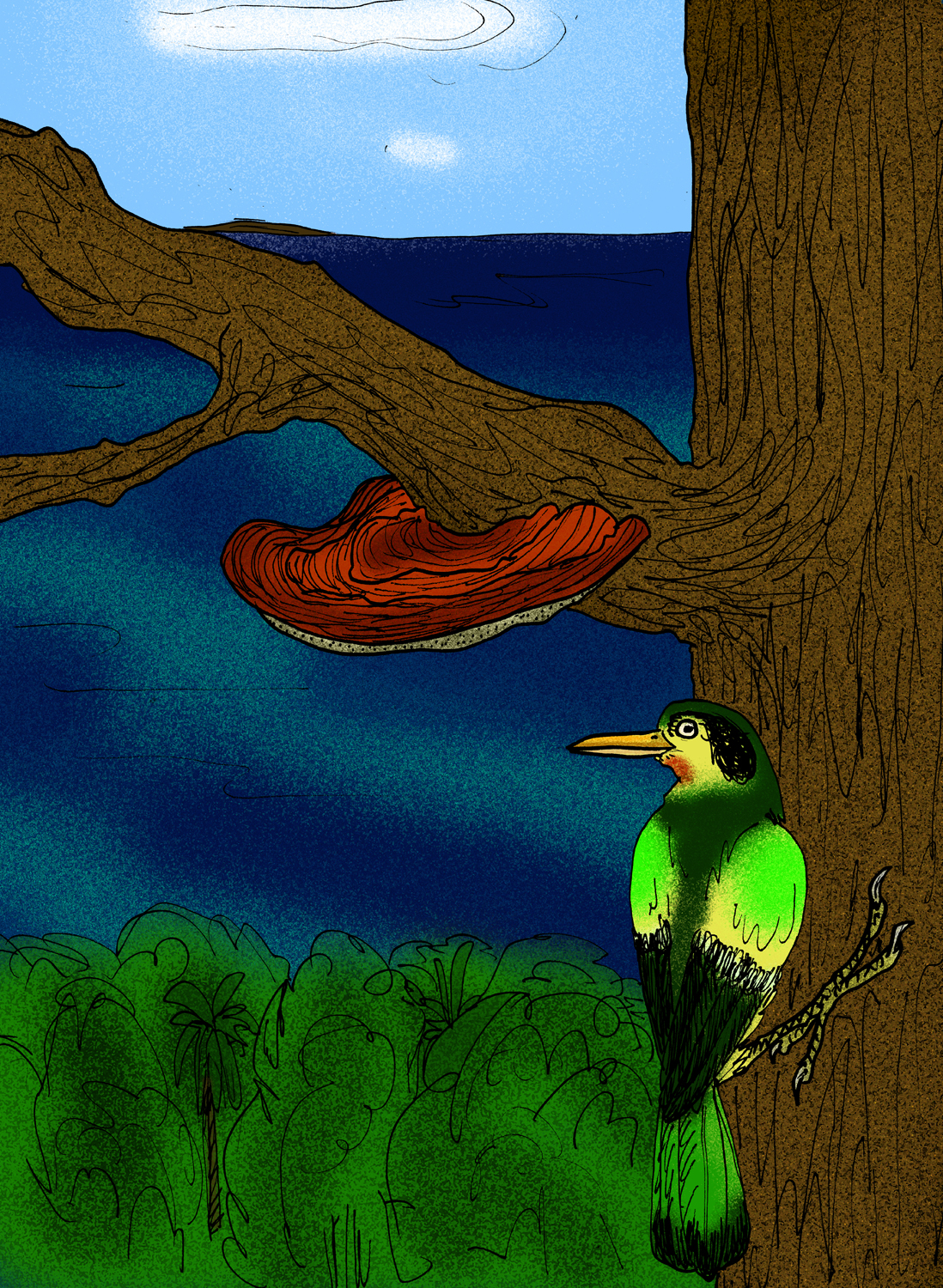
- Restoration of A. vancouverensis

Scientific classification
- Domain: Eukaryota
- Kingdom: Fungi
- Division: Basidiomycota
- Class: Agaricomycetes
- Order: Hymenochaetales
- Family: Hymenochaetaceae
- Genus: †Appianoporites; Smith, Currah & Stockey, 2004
- Species: †A. vancouverensis

Binomial name
- †Appianoporites vancouverensis Smith, Currah & Stockey, 2004

= Appianoporites =

Appianoporites Temporal range: Eocene

Extinct genus of fungi

Appianoporites is an extinct monotypic genus of fungus in the Agaricomycetes family Hymenochaetaceae. At present it contains the single species Appianoporites vancouverensis.

The genus is solely known from the Eocene Appian Way deposits on Vancouver Island. Appianoporites, the first fossil fungus species to be described from the Appian Way strata, is one of only three found on Vancouver Island, British Columbia: the agaricomycete Quatsinoporites cranhamii was described from a Cretaceous fossil at the same time as Appianoporites, while a third fungus, Margaretbarromyces dictyosporus was described three years later.

== History and classification ==
The genus is known only from the single holotype, a partial bracket fungus fruiting body, or conk. The specimen, AW 104 D top, is currently residing in the collections housed by the Royal British Columbia Museum, Victoria. The specimen was collected south of the Campbell River on the eastern shore of Vancouver Island. The partial conk was preserved in a calcareous nodule recovered from a silty mudstone matrix. The nodules formed in a shallow marine environment along with abundant plant material.

It was first studied by a group of researchers consisting of Selena Smith, Randolph Currah and Ruth Stockey, all from the University of Alberta. Smith and colleagues published their 2004 type description in the journal Mycologia volume 96. The generic epithet Appianoporites was coined from a combination of Appian in reference to the type locality and "porites" to reflect that it is a polypore fungus. The specific epithet "vancouverensis" was proposed in recognition of Vancouver Island, where the fossil deposits are.

When first described Appianoporites vancouverensis was the second fungus species to be described from Vancouver Island and the fourth species to be described from British Columbia. Cryptodidymosphaerites princetonensis and Palaeoserenomyces allenbyensis were the first fossil fungi to be described from British Columbia, known only from the Early Eocene Allenby Formation near Princeton, B.C. Quatsinoporites cranhamii, a Cretaceous age agaricomycete, was described in the same paper from deposits along the western shore of Vancouver Island. Three years later the ascomycete Margaretbarromyces dictyosporus was described from the Appian Way site.

== Description ==
The holotype of Appianoporites is a lone fragment of fruiting body 7.0 millimetres (0.28 in) by 2.5 millimetres (0.098 in) and 3.3 millimetres (0.13 in) deep, which was abraded by water transport before preservation in a calcareous nodule. The conk section has an average of six 130 to 163 μm diameter tubes per millimeter. The fungus is composed of monomitic hyphae. Due to the abraded nature of the specimen the basidia and basidiospores are both unknown at this time. The specimen was studied by cutting the calcareous nodule into slices with a rock saw and using the cellulose acetate peel technique to create slides that were examined under stereo microscope.

Though a number of polypore fungi groups Appianoporites is placed in Hymenochaetaceae based on the structure of the poroid hymenophore, the presence of setae and monomitic hyphal system lacking clamp connections. This placement is tentative due to limited characters available in the fossil including the lack of diagnostic features such as the basidiospores.
