= Margaretbarromyces =

Margaretbarromyces Temporal range: Eocene

Scientific classification
- Domain: Eukaryota
- Kingdom: Fungi
- Division: Ascomycota
- Class: Dothideomycetes
- Order: Pleosporales
- Family: incertae sedis
- Genus: †Margaretbarromyces; Mindell, Stockey, Beard, & Currah, 2007
- Species: †M. dictyosporus

Binomial name
- †Margaretbarromyces dictyosporus Mindell, Stockey, Beard, & Currah, 2007

Extinct genus of fungi

Margaretbarromyces is an extinct monotypic genus of pleosporale fungus of uncertain family placement. At present it contains the single species Margaretbarromyces dictyosporus.

The genus is solely known from the Eocene aged, Appian Way deposits on Vancouver Island. Margaretbarromyces is one of only three known fossil fungus species found on Vancouver Island and the most recent to be described from the Appian Way strata. The agaricomycete Quatsinoporites cranhamii was described from a Cretaceous fossil and Appianoporites vancouverensis, from the same deposits as Margaretbarromyces were jointly described in a 2004 research paper.

== History and classification ==
The genus Margaretbarromyces is known only from the single holotype, a complete ascoma like fungus fruiting body. The specimen, AW 400 Htop 0-12, is currently residing in the paleobotanical collections housed by the University of Alberta, Edmonton, Alberta, Canada. The specimen was collected south of the Campbell River on the eastern shore of Vancouver Island, British Columbia, Canada. The fungus specimen was preserved in a calcareous nodule recovered from a silty mudstone matrix. The nodules formed in a shallow marine environment along with abundant plant material.

It was first studied by a group of researchers consisting of Randal Mindell, Randolph Currah and Ruth Stockey, from the University of Alberta and Graham Beard of the Vancouver Island Paleontology Museum, Qualicum Beach, British Columbia. Mindell and colleagues published their 2007 type description in the journal Mycological Research volume 111. The generic epithet Margaretbarromyces was coined from a recognition of Margaret Barr for here research on the loculoascomycete fungi and "myces" to reflect that it is a fungus. The specific epithet "dictyosporus" was coined to reflect the condition of the ascospores.

When first described Margaretbarromyces dictyosporus was the most recent fungus species to be described from Vancouver Island. Cryptodidymosphaerites princetonensis and Palaeoserenomyces allenbyensis were the first fossil fungi to be described from British Columbia, known only from the Early Eocene Allenby Formation near Princeton, B.C. Quatsinoporites cranhamii a Cretaceous age agaricomycete from the western coast of Vancouver Island and Appianoporites vancouverensis, also from the Appian Way site, were described in the same 2004 paper. With its publication three years later, Margaretbarromyces was the fifth fossil fungus described from British Columbia.

== Description ==
The holotype of Margaretbarromyces is a lone ascoma like fruiting body 390 μm in diameter by 420 μm in height in bark of an unidentified seed plant, which was transported by water before preservation in a calcareous nodule. The ascoma is composed of high branching and complex anastomosed hyphae. The interior chamber of the ascoma, filled with calcite, preserves several asci and a number of ascospores. Though the asci are faint the groupings of ascospores are well preserved showing the placement of the asci to be basal. Each ascospore is between 55 and 90 μm and dictyosporous. The specimen was studied by cutting the calcareous nodule into slices with a rock saw and using the cellulose acetate peel technique to create slides that were examined under stereo microscope.

With its distinct basal asci placement and dictyosporous ascospores, combined with the ascoma growing within existing tissues, Margaretbarromyces distinct from known genera. Though several other fungal orders have some similar characters the particular grouping found in Margaretbarromyces is closest to members of the Pleosporales. Placement at the family level is uncertain due to the fluctuating nature of the family descriptions.
