= Acanthostichus bentoni =

Scientific classification
- Kingdom: Animalia
- Phylum: Arthropoda
- Class: Insecta
- Order: Hymenoptera
- Family: Formicidae
- Genus: Acanthostichus
- Species: A. bentoni

Binomial name
- Acanthostichus bentoni Mackay, W.P., 1996

Species of ant

Acanthostichus bentoni is a species of ant belonging to the genus Acanthostichus. It was described by Mackay in 1996. These ants are distributed in Brazil.
