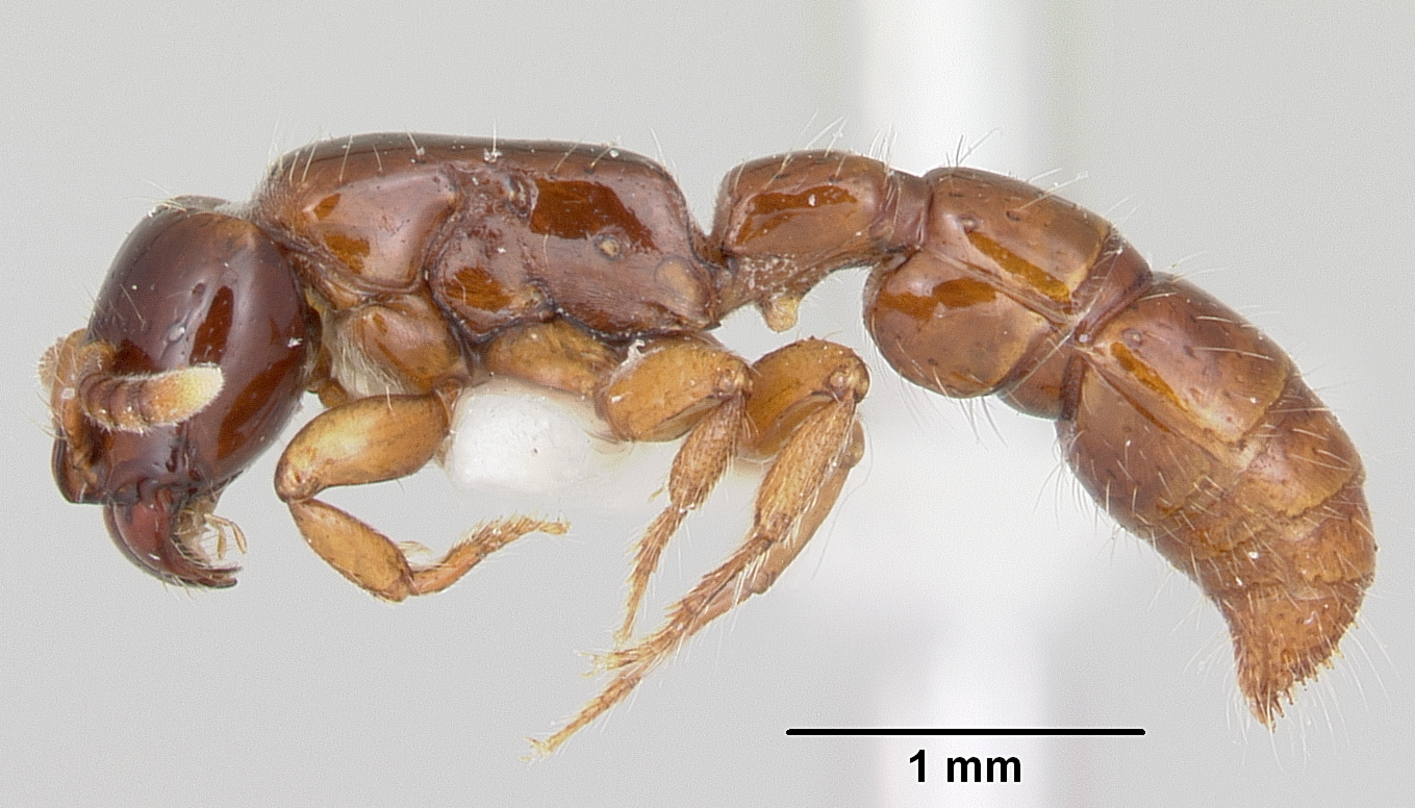
- A. texanus worker from Mexico

Scientific classification
- Domain: Eukaryota
- Kingdom: Animalia
- Phylum: Arthropoda
- Class: Insecta
- Order: Hymenoptera
- Family: Formicidae
- Subfamily: Dorylinae
- Genus: Acanthostichus; Mayr, 1887

Type species
- Typhlopone serratula

Diversity
- 24 species

Synonyms
- Ctenopyga Ashmead, 1906

= Acanthostichus =

Acanthostichus Temporal range: Burdigalian? - Recent

Genus of ants

Acanthostichus is a predatory and predominantly subterranean genus of ant in the subfamily Dorylinae. They are found in the New World, from the southern United States to Uruguay, Paraguay and northern Argentina. They are probably common, but due to their subterranean nature, they are seldom collected or seen.

Most species are very similar; the petiole is the most important feature in identifying species. Many are known only from a few collections, or even single specimen, which makes it hard to determine variability within species. For this reason, many described members of this genus may be synonyms.

== Species ==
The genus currently contains 24 species:

- Acanthostichus arizonensis MacKay, 1996
- Acanthostichus bentoni MacKay, 1996
- Acanthostichus brevicornis Emery, 1894
- Acanthostichus brevinodis MacKay, 1996
- Acanthostichus concavinodis MacKay, 1996
- Acanthostichus davisi (Smith, 1942)
- Acanthostichus emmae MacKay, 1996
- Acanthostichus femoralis Kusnezov, 1962
- Acanthostichus flexuosus MacKay, 1996
- Acanthostichus fuscipennis Emery, 1895
- †Acanthostichus hispaniolicus De Andrade, 1998
- Acanthostichus kirbyi Emery, 1895
- Acanthostichus laevigatus MacKay, 1996
- Acanthostichus laticornis Forel, 1908
- Acanthostichus lattkei MacKay, 1996
- Acanthostichus longinodis Mackay, 2004
- Acanthostichus punctiscapus MacKay, 1996
- Acanthostichus quadratus Emery, 1895
- Acanthostichus quirozi MacKay, 1996
- Acanthostichus sanchezorum MacKay, 1985
- Acanthostichus serratulus (Smith, 1858)
- Acanthostichus skwarrae Wheeler, 1934
- Acanthostichus texanus Forel, 1904
- Acanthostichus truncatus MacKay, 1996
