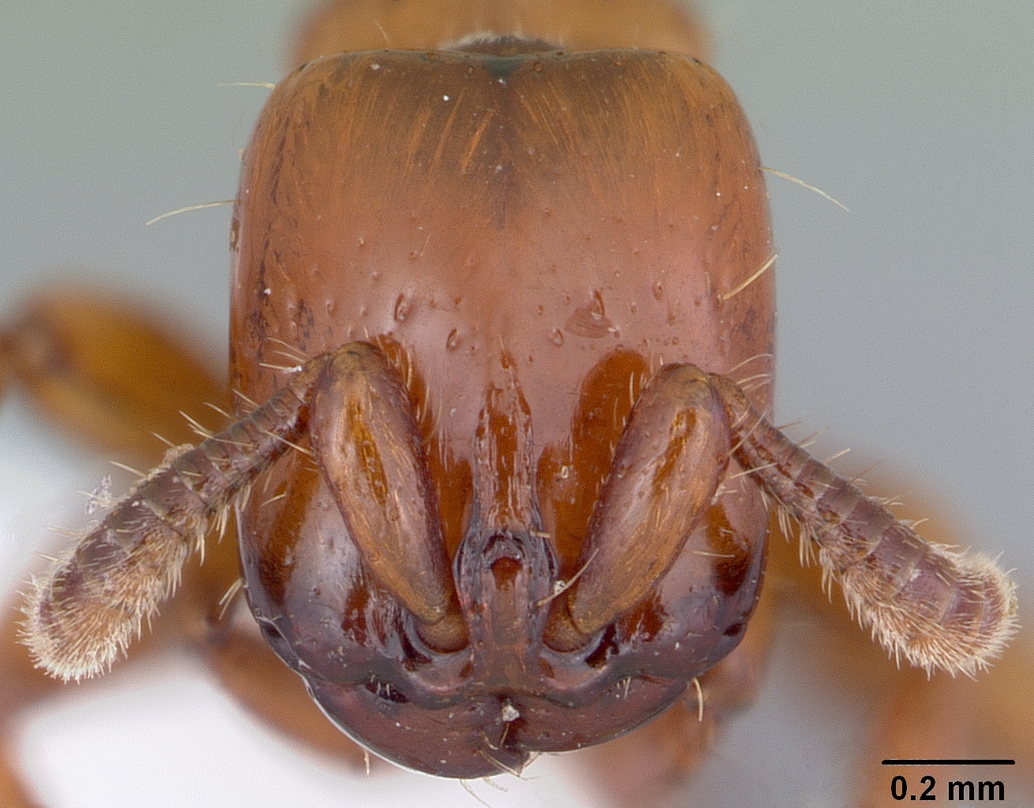
- Head view of an A. arizonensis worker

Scientific classification
- Domain: Eukaryota
- Kingdom: Animalia
- Phylum: Arthropoda
- Class: Insecta
- Order: Hymenoptera
- Family: Formicidae
- Genus: Acanthostichus
- Species: A. arizonensis

Binomial name
- Acanthostichus arizonensis Mackay, W.P., 1996

= Acanthostichus arizonensis =

Species of ant

Acanthostichus arizonensis is a species of ant belonging to the genus Acanthostichus. It was described by Mackay in 1996. These ants are distributed in the United States and Mexico.
