= Uhlia =

Uhlia Temporal range: Ypresian

Scientific classification
- Kingdom: Plantae
- Clade: Tracheophytes
- Clade: Angiosperms
- Clade: Monocots
- Clade: Commelinids
- Order: Arecales
- Family: Arecaceae
- Subfamily: Coryphoideae
- Tribe: Trachycarpeae
- Genus: †Uhlia; Erwin & Stockey
- Species: †U. allenbyensis

Binomial name
- †Uhlia allenbyensis Erwin & Stockey

Extinct monotypic genus of coryphoid palm

Uhlia is an extinct genus of coryphoid palm containing a single species Uhlia allenbyensis. The species is known from permineralized remains recovered from the Princeton Chert in British Columbia, Canada. Leaves of Uhlia have "tar spot"-like fungal infections of the extinct ascomycete Paleoserenomyces, which in turn are hyperparasitized by the ascomycete Cryptodidymosphaerites.

== Distribution ==
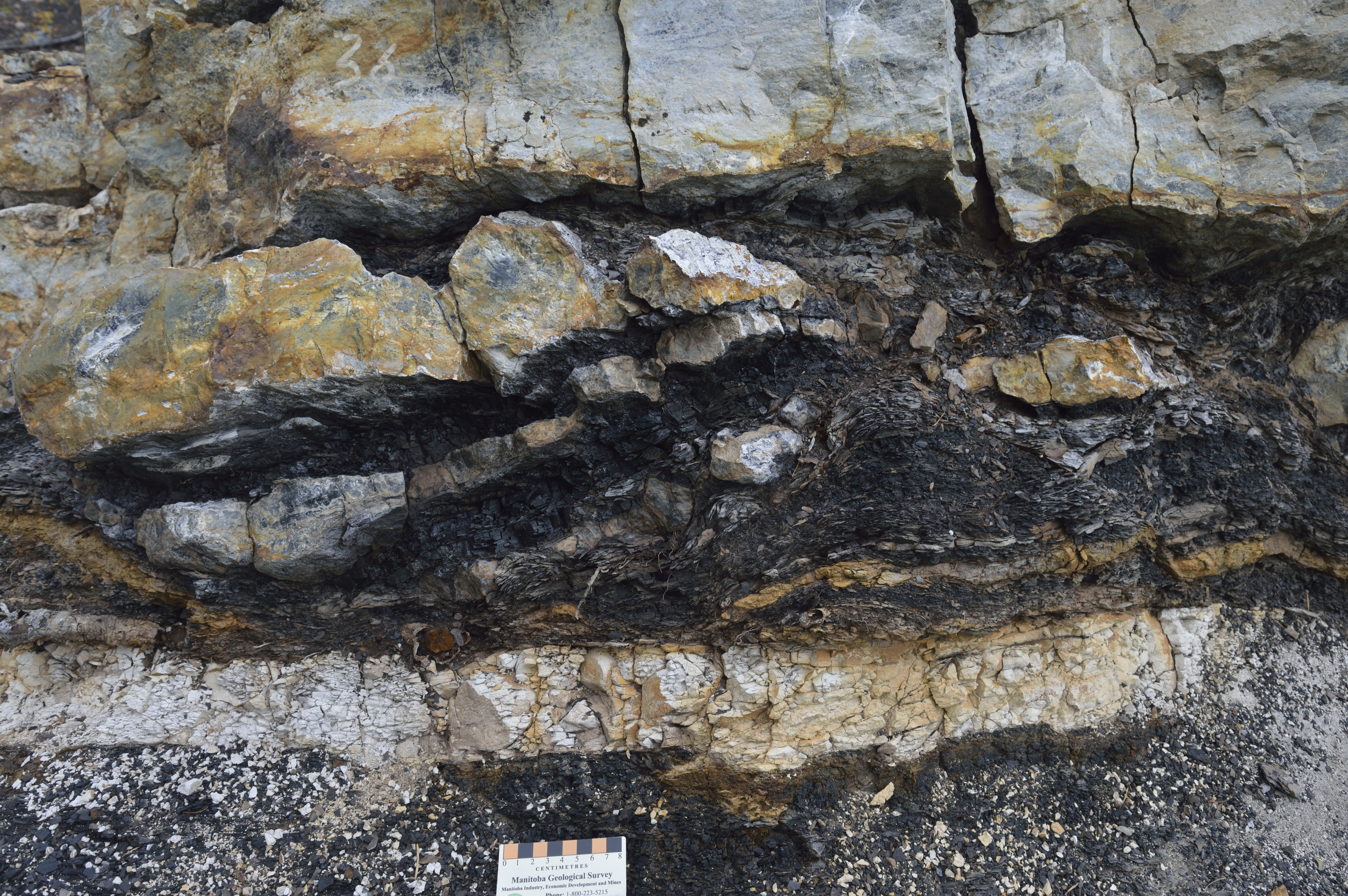
Close up of Princeton Chert outcrop showing volcanic ash (white layer at base), peaty coal (dark layer), and Chert layers (grey). Layer 36 is labelled.

Uhlia allenbyensis is known exclusively from the Princeton Chert, a fossil locality in British Columbia, Canada, which comprises an anatomically preserved flora of Eocene Epoch age, with rich species abundance and diversity. The chert is located in exposures of the Allenby Formation on the east bank of the Similkameen River, 8.5 km (5.3 mi) south of the town of Princeton, British Columbia.

Notable in conjunction with the coal seams of the Allenby Formation are sections of chert which formed during silica-rich periods. The rapid cyclical changes from coal to chert and back are not noted in any other fossil locality in the world. An estimated 49 coal/chert cycles are known, though the exact conditions for this process are not well understood. Silica-rich volcanic episodes in the region during deposition would have been needed for formation of the cherts, while slowly moving waters and gently subsiding terrains would be needed for the peats and fens to accumulate. Rates of organic deposition in swamps have been estimated at approximately 0.5–1 mm (0.020–0.039 in) in modern temperate climates, this suggests the time needed for each 10–20 cm (3.9–7.9 in) chert layer would be at least 100 years or more, with the full sequence of cycles taking place over no more than 15,000 years.

The Allenby Formation is one of the southernmost of the Eocene Okanagan Highlands lakes in British Columbia and second most southern site after the Klondike Mountain Formation of Republic, Washington, in northern Ferry County. In British Columbia, the formation is coeval to the Tranquille Formation, known from the McAbee Fossil Beds and Falkland site, the Coldwater Beds, known from the Quilchena site, and Driftwood Canyon Provincial Park. The highlands, including the Allenby Formation, have been described as one of the "Great Canadian Lagerstätten" based on the diversity, quality and unique nature of the biotas that are preserved. The highlands temperate biome preserved across a large transect of lakes recorded many of the earliest appearances of modern genera, while also documenting the last stands of ancient lines.

== History and classification ==
The chert palm fossils were first briefly described in 1976 by James Basinger as part of his PhD thesis; however, due to the isolated nature of the leaf and petiole specimens known at that time, the fossils were not given specific taxonomic treatment. Additional collecting and examination of recovered chert blocks over the next decade and a half included additional palm fossils and allowed for in-depth study by paleobotanists Diane Erwin and Ruth Stockey in the early 1990s. Erwin and Stockey used cellulose acetate peels with hydrofluoric acid to create serial thin sections of the fossils for anatomical and cellular study. The microscope slides were accessioned into the University of Alberta palaeobotanical collections. The formal description of the new genus and species was published by Erwin and Stockey (1994) in the journal Palaeontographica Abteilung B, with the genus name Uhlia being chosen as a matronym honoring palm systematist Natalie Uhl in recognition of her work on palm taxonomy and the specific name allenbyensis coined from Allenby, British Columbia, the ghost town that the Allenby Formation takes its name from.

In the type description, U. allenbyensis was assigned to the palm subfamily Coryphoideae and tribe Corypheae based on the similarity in leaf and stem anatomy to the living genera Brahea, Rhapidophyllum, and Serenoa. Subsequently phylogenetic evaluation of Coryphoideae has led to tribe Corypheae being restricted to only the type genus, with all other former members being placed on other tribes, Cryosophileae or Trachycarpeae.

== Description ==
Uhlia allenbyensis was a rhizomatous palm, with roots growing from the lower side of stems and leaves from the upper side. The roots range between 4–10 mm (0.16–0.39 in) wide with a central stele. The root cortex displays a narrow innermost layer of cells, and a middle cortex with a aerenchymous structure. The stems show a periderm-like layer of cells having irregular to rectangular shape and organized into vertical rows. Underlying the periderm-like layer the stem tissues are grouped into three major zones. The innermost zone, the central region, extends from the stem center to the boundary point with the "B zone". The peripheral area of the central region displays both leaf traces and vascular groupings which were interpreted as inflorescence traces.

== Paleoecology ==
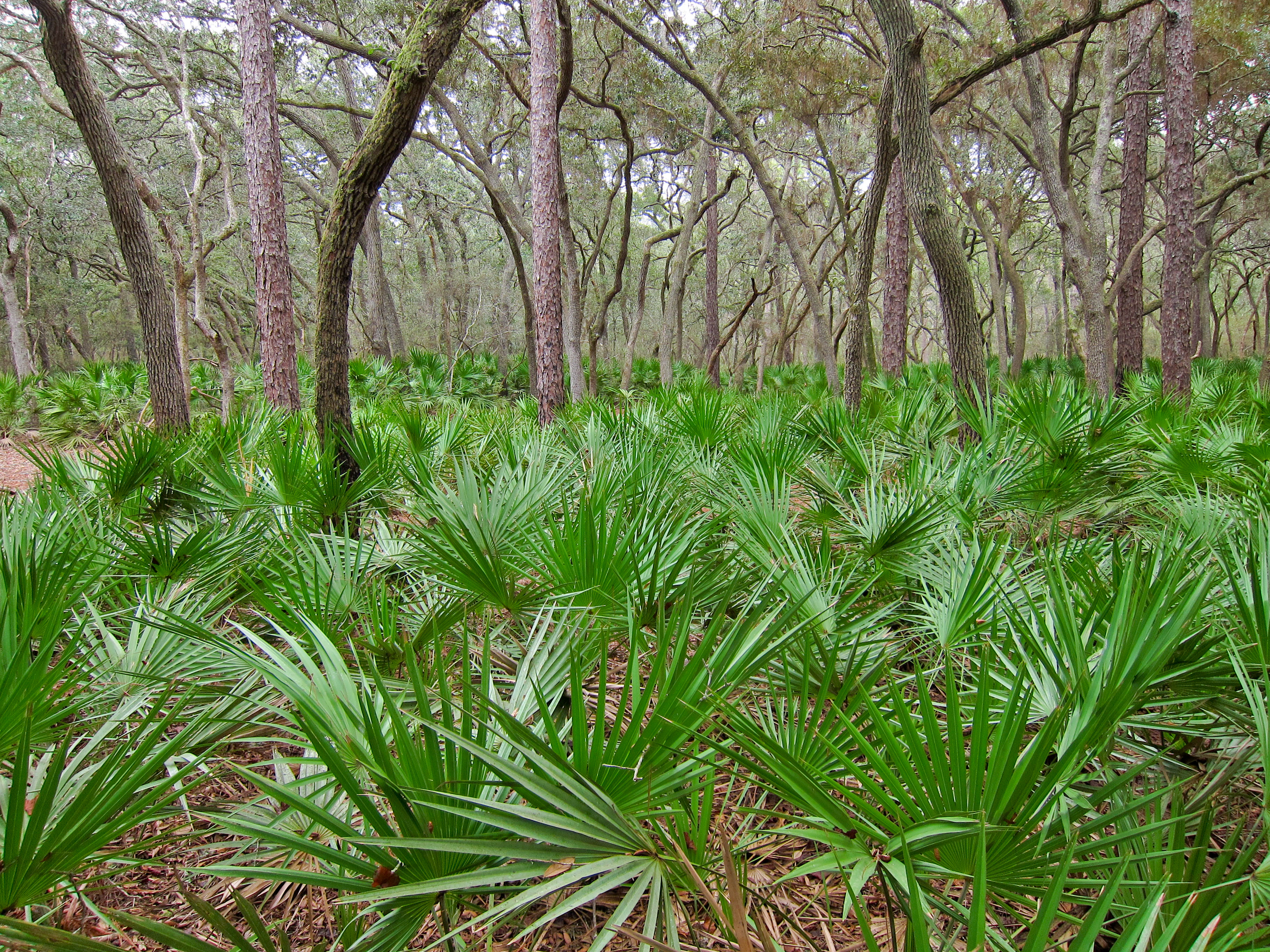
Modern saw palmettos in Georgia, USA

Leaves of Uhlia allenbyensis show parasitism by the parasitic fungus Paleoserenomyces allenbyensis which invaded the leaf surface cells. These parasitized areas have been described as similar to modern "tar spot" infections on leaves. In some cells of P. allenbyensis the hyperparasitic fungus Cryptodidymosphaerites princetonensis was preserved, providing a firm fossil record for fungal hyperparasitism.

The low stature of U. allenbyensis has been likened to that of the modern saw palmetto Serenoa repens, a morphology consistent with its tribal placement. Palm beetle fossils are also found in the greater Okanagan highlands, both in the Tranquille Formation north of Princeton and in the Klondike Mountain Formation to the south. The beetles have been assigned to the Caryobruchus – Speciomerus genus group and are obligate parasites of palms in the tribes Cocoaceae, Coryphaea, Hyphorbeae, and Phoeniceae.

== Paleoenvironment ==
The Princeton chert preserves an aquatic system with silica rich slow moving waters which was likely a peat fen ecosystem. While other fossil producing areas of the Allenby Formation are likely the product of deep water deposition and diatomite sedimentation, the chert layers originate from shallow waters, as evidenced by plant and animal fossils. The Okanagan Highland sites, such as the Princeton chert represent upland lake systems that were surrounded by a warm temperate ecosystem with nearby volcanism. The highlands likely had a mesic upper microthermal to lower mesothermal climate, in which winter temperatures rarely dropped low enough for snow and which were seasonably equitable. The Okanagan Highlands paleoforest surrounding the lakes have been described as precursors to the modern temperate broadleaf and mixed forests of Eastern North America and Eastern Asia. Based on the fossil biotas, the lakes were higher and cooler than the coeval coastal forests preserved in the Puget Group and Chuckanut Formation of Western Washington, which are described as lowland tropical forest ecosystems. Estimates of the paleoelevation range between 0.7–1.2 km (0.43–0.75 mi) higher than the coastal forests. This is consistent with the paleoelevation estimates for the lake systems, which range between 1.1–2.9 km (1,100–2,900 m), which is similar to the modern elevation of 0.8 km (0.50 mi) but higher.

Estimates of the mean annual temperature have been derived from climate leaf analysis multivariate program (CLAMP) analysis and leaf margin analysis (LMA) of the Princeton paleoflora. The CLAMP results after multiple linear regressions for Princeton's gave a 5.1 °C (41.2 °F), and the LMA returned a mean annual temperature of 5.1 ± 2.2 °C (41.2 ± 4.0 °F). This is lower than the mean annual temperature estimates given for the coastal Puget Group, which is estimated to have been between 15–18.6 °C (59.0–65.5 °F). The bioclimatic analysis for Princeton suggest mean annual precipitation amount of 114 ± 42 cm (45 ± 17 in).

The warm temperate uplands floras of the Allenby Formation and greater highlands in association with downfaulted lacustrine basins and active volcanism are noted to have no exact modern equivalents. This is due to the more seasonally equitable conditions of the Early Eocene, resulting in much lower seasonal temperature shifts. However, the highlands have been compared to the upland ecological islands in the Virunga Mountains within the Albertine Rift of the African rift valley.
