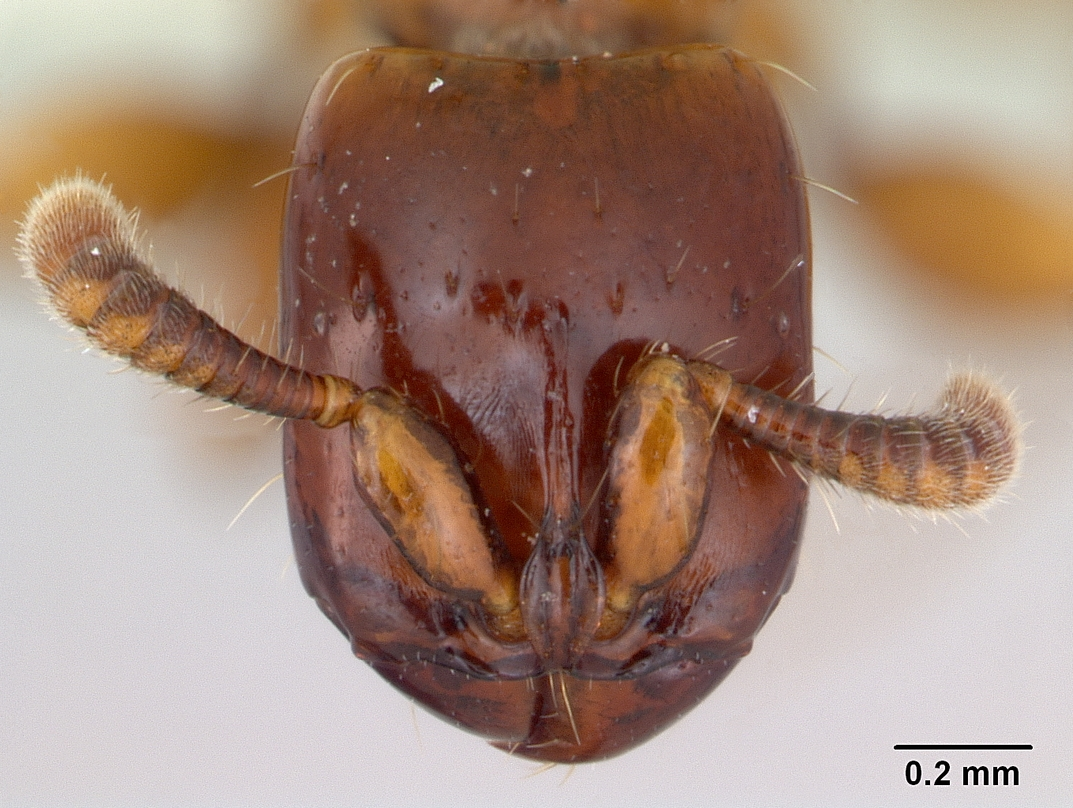
- Head view of a worker

Scientific classification
- Domain: Eukaryota
- Kingdom: Animalia
- Phylum: Arthropoda
- Class: Insecta
- Order: Hymenoptera
- Family: Formicidae
- Genus: Acanthostichus
- Species: A. brevicornis

Binomial name
- Acanthostichus brevicornis Emery, 1894

Synonyms
- Acanthostichus ramosmexiae Bruch, 1924

= Acanthostichus brevicornis =

Species of ant

Acanthostichus brevicornis is a species of ant belonging to the genus Acanthostichus. Emery first described the species in 1894, and a synonym was given by Bruch in 1924. Their distribution is in South America, in the countries of Argentina, Brazil, Guyana, Paraguay and Suriname.
