= Princeton Chert =

Fossilized Flora

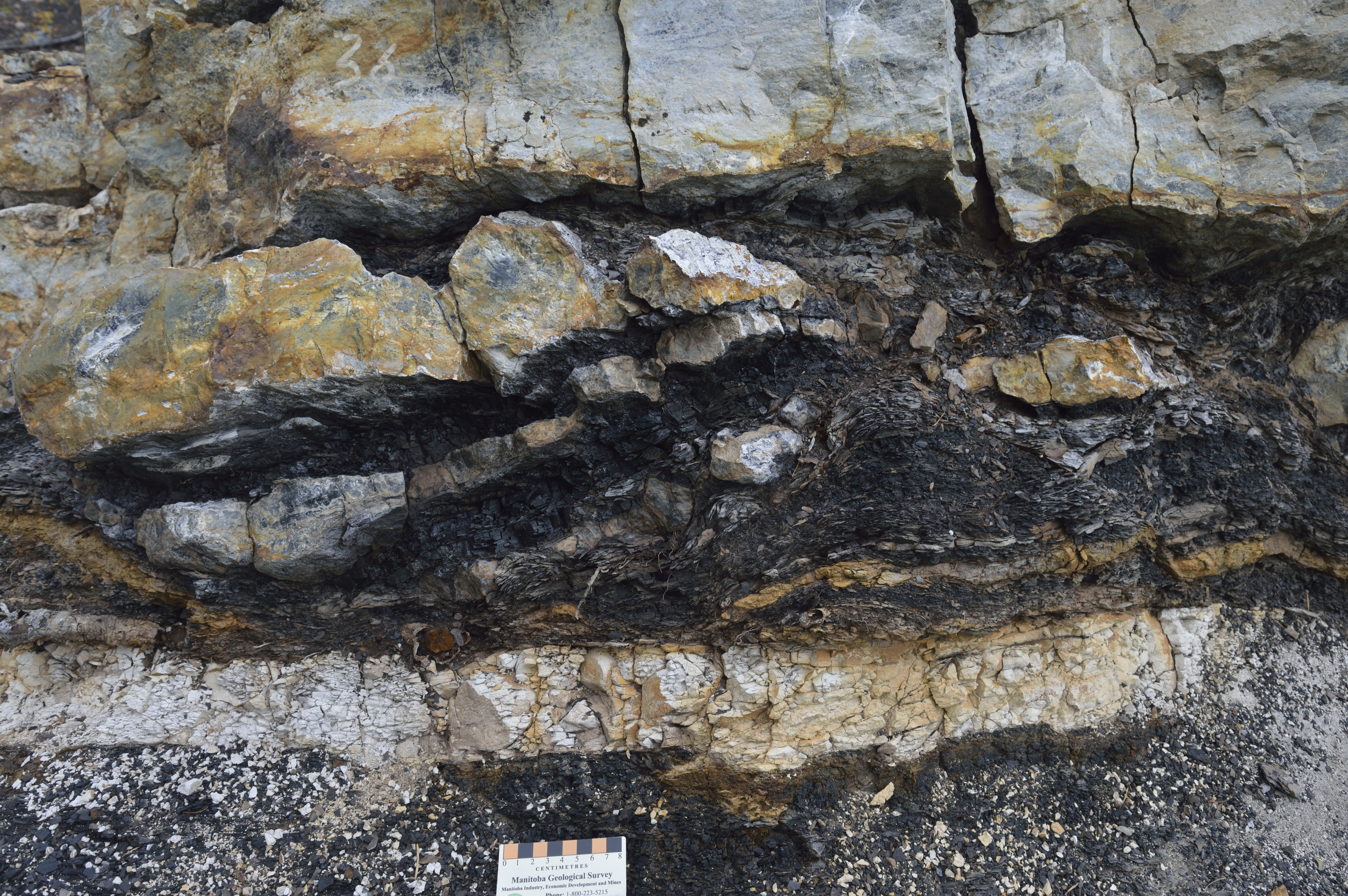
Close up of Princeton Chert outcrop showing volcanic ash (white layer at base), peaty coal (dark layer), and Chert layers (grey). Layer 36 is labelled.

The Princeton Chert is a fossil locality in British Columbia, Canada, which comprises an anatomically preserved flora of Eocene Epoch age, with rich species abundance and diversity. It is located in exposures of the Allenby Formation on the east bank of the Similkameen River, 8.5 km (5.3 mi) south of the town of Princeton, British Columbia.

== History ==
The Princeton Chert (Ashnola shale in older sources) and its fossils have been known since the 1950s, but have attracted increased attention in the late 1970 and on. This may be due to the rare type of silica permineralized fossil Lagerstätten found, which has preserved plants and animals in minute 3D detail, with exceptional internal cellular detail. This has meant anatomical descriptions and reconstruction of whole plants from isolated parts has been possible in many species. Few plant fossils elsewhere in the world exhibit such excellence in both preservation and diversity. Similar aged fossil beds in Eocene lake sediments are found elsewhere in British Columbia, including in Driftwood Canyon Provincial Park near Smithers in northern British Columbia, the McAbee Fossil Beds west of Kamloops, about 160 km (160,000 m) NNW of the Princeton Chert beds, and the Klondike Mountain Formation around Republic, Washington, south of Princeton.

== Location and geologic setting ==
The Princeton Chert is an interbedded sequence consisting of coal, shale, volcanic ash, and chert in the Allenby Formation. 49 chert layers, ranging in thickness from 1 to 55 cm (0.39 to 21.65 in) have been recognized and described, though each is not unique in organisms preserved. Despite this, trends are evident throughout the outcrop, with certain taxa appearing and disappearing with time.

The Princeton Chert was originally considered to be Middle Eocene based on data from mammals, freshwater fish, and potassium-argon dates. Recently, more accurate radiometric techniques provided a date of 48.7 mya, placing the Princeton Chert in the Ypresian stage (47.8–56.0 mya), consistent with the whole Allenby Formation being now dated radiometrically as being Early Eocene.

The climate at this time was warm; it had reached a maximum during a series of warming events during the Early Eocene with the Princeton Chert likely deposited after the Eocene Thermal Maximum 2 and during the Early Eocene Climatic Optimum. During this time the sea warmed approximately 4 °C and terrestrial temperatures were several degrees warmer than today, meaning little or no ice was present at the poles. The temperature difference between poles and equator was small. This long term warmth is thought to be due to increased greenhouse gases, particularly CO_{2} trapping more heat. The reason for this sudden increase in CO_{2} is unknown, but it is hypothesised that it was due to an increase in ocean floor being recycled via volcanic arcs and metamorphic decarbonation reactions. This happened because the ocean between India and Asia was disappearing and being replaced by the Himalayas and the Tibetan Plateau due to the collision of tectonic plates. Also at the time, Australia, which was joined to Antarctica, was beginning to move northwards.

The Princeton Chert fossils indicate that the area was an aquatic ecosystem, growing in tropical to subtropical conditions. More recent analysis of the fossil flora, however reconstructs for the Princeton Chert flora a moist warm temperate climate with mean annual temperature 13.1 ± 3.1 °C, with mild winters (cold month mean temperature 5.3 ± 2.8 °C), and mean annual precipitation 114 ± 42 cm per year. Several of the smaller chert layers are separated by volcanic ash layers, indicating nearby volcanic activity. It is thought that fossils were pervaded with silicic acid due to this volcanic activity. Subsequently, water charged with minerals flowed from springs or geysers into the low lying basin where the Princeton chert was located. Here, the water surrounded organisms as they grew, along with plant debris which had been accumulated. Many organisms were preserved in situ, in the lake or small pond environment in which they lived. The preservation must have been rapid, due to the minute cellular detail which has been conserved. This sequence of events is thought to have been replicated up to 50 times, as the basin allowed peat to re-accumulate each time, producing the multiple layers.

== Known biota ==
Sampling into the Princeton Chert has been carried out, but presently the data has not been analysed in detail. Across the outcrop, trends in taxa can be seen; in the topmost layers fossil organs of Metasequoia milleri cease to be represented, yet Pinus (pine) and monocotyledons increase in number. There is a huge increase in ferns, such as Dennstaedtiopsis, after a huge ash fall, though few angiosperms occur in these layers. A large number of angiosperms have been found along with several types of conifers, ferns, and several unidentified fossils from various families.

=== In situ lacustrine fossils ===
The array of floral and faunal fossils found in the Princeton Chert has offered unequivocal evidence that it was a lacustrine or lake environment. The plant fossils found show many structural and anatomical adaptations to an aquatic environment, including a reduced vascular system, aerenchyma in tissues (air spaces to provide buoyancy), and protoxylem lacunae surrounded by a ring of cells with thickened inner walls. Further evidence is provided by the fossils’ clear affinities with modern aquatic angiosperms. Many extant plants show these adaptations and are similar to the organisms found in the chert. For example, water lilies (Allenbya, Nymphaeaceae), water plantains (Alismataceae), arums (Keratosperma, Araceae) and rushes and sedges (Ethela, Juncaceae/Cyperaceae) are just some of the angiosperms found both today and in the Princeton Chert. Seeds have also been found which share adaptations with living aquatics. On the other hand, terrestrial fossils have rarely been found. The few that are, are represented mainly by seeds, some of which may have been transported by birds.

Additional support for the aquatic nature of the Princeton Chert deposits comes from animal fossils. Several fossils of a freshwater fish, Amia (bowfin), have been found in the shale overlying the plant deposits, along with remains of the freshwater fishes Amyzon and Libotonius, plus a soft-shelled turtle.

=== Fungi ===
Pathogenic fungi have been recorded on the leaves and other organs of some vascular plants. Fossil Uhlia palms have tar spot fungi on their leaves described as Paleoserenomyces, which is in turn parasitized by a mycoparasite, Cryptodidymosphaerites princetonensis. Symbiotic mycorrhizal relationships have also been preserved in roots of Pinus and Metasequoia milleri. In Metasequoia these associations have been compared to extant mycorrhizae, and found to be very similar. The mycorrhizal relationship with Pinus was the first documentation of ectomycorrhizae from the fossil record, with the fungi suggested as close to the modern pine symbiotics Rhizopogon and Suillus

=== Paleofauna ===
| Family | Genus | species | Notes | Images |
|---|---|---|---|---|
| Undescribed | Undescribed | Undescribed | A lepidopteran forewing Not described to family/genus/species | |
| Undescribed | Undescribed | undescribed | A turtle, Bones preserved in the Princeton Chert | |

=== Paleoflora ===
==== Pteridophytes ====
| Family | Genus | species | Notes | Images |
|---|---|---|---|---|
| Athyriaceae | †Dickwhitea | †Dickwhitea allenbyensis | An athyriaceous fern | |
| Athyriaceae | †Makotopteris | †Makotopteris princetonensis | An athyriaceous fern | |
| Blechnaceae | †Trawetsia | †Trawetsia princetonensis | A blechnacious fern | |
| Blechnaceae | †Dennstaedtiopsis | †Dennstaedtiopsis aerenchymata | A dennstaedtioid fern | |
| Osmundaceae | Osmunda | Undescribed | An osmundaceous fern Not identified to species | |

==== Conifers ====
| Family | Genus | Species | Notes | Images |
|---|---|---|---|---|
| Cupressaceae | Metasequoia | †Metasequoia milleri | A dawn redwood | |
| Pinaceae | Pinus | †Pinus allisonii | A 2-needled Pine | |
| Pinaceae | Pinus | †Pinus andersonii | A 3-needled Pine | |
| Pinaceae | Pinus | †Pinus arnoldii | A basal Pine, First described for ovulate cones A whole plant reconstruction includes the synonymized P. similkameenensis. | |
| Pinaceae | Pinus | †Pinus princetonensis | A pinaceous cone | |

==== Angiosperms ====
| Family | Genus | Species | Notes | Images |
|---|---|---|---|---|
| Alismataceae | †Heleophyton | †Heleophyton helobieoides | An aquatic or emergent water-plantain | |
| Aponogetonaceae | Aponogeton | †Aponogeton longispinosum | A Cape-pondweed pollen | |
| Araceae | †Keratosperma | †Keratosperma allenbyensis | A lasioid arum family seed genus | |
| Arecaceae | †Uhlia | Uhlia allenbyensis | A Coryphoid palm | |
| Grossulariaceae | Ribes | Undescribed | A current fruit Not described | |
| Cf. Iridaceae | †Pararisteapollis | †Pararisteapollis stockeyi | A possible iridaceous pollen morphotype | |
| Lauraceae | Undescribed | Undescribed | A lauraceous fruit. Briefly described by Little et al (2009) but not named | |
| Lythraceae | Decodon | †Decodon allenbyensis | A swamp loosestrife Initially described from seeds Little & Stockey (2003) provided a whole plant reconstruction | |
| Magnoliaceae | †Liriodendroxylon | †Liriodendroxylon princetonensis | A Liriodendron-like wood. | |
| Myrtaceae | †Paleomyrtinaea | †Paleomyrtinaea princetonensis | A Myrtaceous fruit | |
| Nymphaeaceae | †Allenbya | †Allenbya collinsonae | A waterlily relative. Not to be confused with the odonate Allenbya | |
| Nyssaceae | Diplopanax | †Diplopanax eydei | A tuplo relative. | |
| Rosaceae | †Paleorosa | †Paleorosa similkameenensis | A rose family flower | |
| Rosaceae | Prunus | †Prunus allenbyensis | A prunoid wood. | |
| Rosaceae | Prunus | "Princeton chert species 1" | A prunoid seed. Not described to species | |
| Rosaceae | Prunus | "Princeton chert species 2" | A prunoid seed. Not described to species | |
| Rosaceae | Prunus | "Princeton chert species 3" | A prunoid seed. Not described to species | |
| Sapindaceae | †Wehrwolfea | †Wehrwolfea striata | A possible dodonaecous soapberry family flower | |
| Saururaceae | Saururus | †Saururus tuckerae | A lizard's-tail species | |
| Vitaceae | Ampelocissus | †"Ampelocissus" similkameenensis | A grape family fruit of uncertain generic placement | |
| Vitaceae | incertae sedis | "Type 1" | A grape family fruit of uncertain generic placement Not described | |
| Vitaceae | incertae sedis | "Type 2" | A grape family fruit of uncertain generic placement Not described | |
| incertae sedis | †Eorhiza | †Eorhiza arnoldii | A semi-aquatic dicot of uncertain affinity. | |
| incertae sedis | †Ethela | †Ethela sargentiana | A cyperaceous or juncaceous poalean monocot | |
| incertae sedis | †Princetonia | †Princetonia allenbyensis | A possibly aquatic magnoliopsid flower of uncertain affiliation. | |
| incertae sedis | †Soleredera | †Soleredera rhizomorpha | A lilialean genus of uncertain placement | |

=== Fungi ===
| Order | Genus | species | Notes | Images |
|---|---|---|---|---|
| Dothideales | †Palaeoserenomyces | †Palaeoserenomyces allenbyensis | An ascomycetan fungus on the host palm Uhlia allenbyensis | |
| Jahnulales | Xylomyces | undescribed | A jahnulalean fungi. Noted to be similar to Xylomyces giganteus. In situ decomposer of Eorhiza arnoldii | |
| Microascales | Culcitalna | undescribed | A microascalean fungi. Noted to be similar to Culcitalna achraspora. In situ decomposer of Eorhiza arnoldii | |
| Microascales | Thielaviopsis | undescribed | A microascalean fungi. Noted to be similar to Thielaviopsis basicola. In situ decomposer of Eorhiza arnoldii | |
| Pleosporales | †Cryptodidymosphaerites | †Cryptodidymosphaerites princetonensis | An ascomycetan fungus hosted on Uhlia allenbyensis | |
| Pleosporales | †Monodictysporites | †Monodictysporites princetonensis | An ascomycotan fungus hosted on Dennstaedtiopsis aerenchymata | |
| Undescribed | Undescribed | Ectomycorrhizae fungi associated with Pinus roots similar to Rhizopogon and Suillus; Not described to genus or species | | |

== See also ==
- Allenby Formation
- Paleoflora of the Eocene Okanagan Highlands
