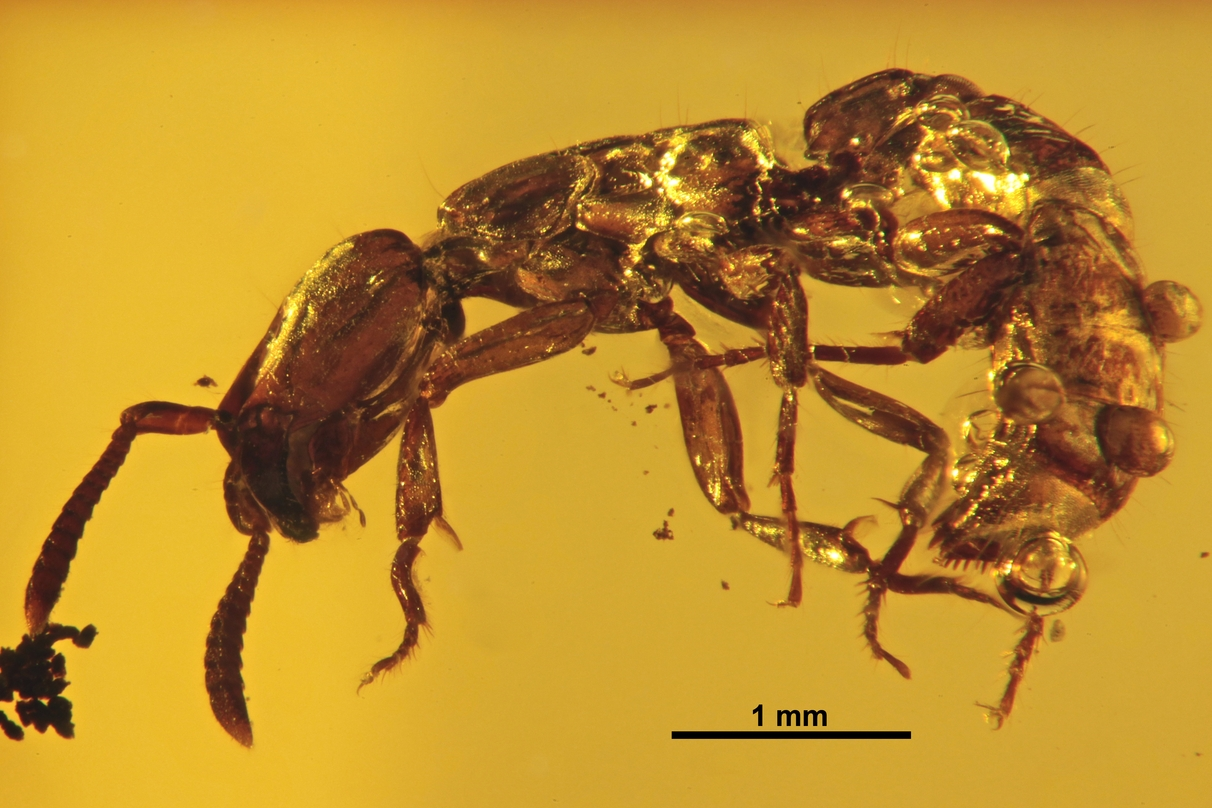
- Acanthostichus hispaniolicus holotype

Scientific classification
- Kingdom: Animalia
- Phylum: Arthropoda
- Clade: Pancrustacea
- Class: Insecta
- Order: Hymenoptera
- Family: Formicidae
- Genus: Acanthostichus
- Species: †A. hispaniolicus

Binomial name
- †Acanthostichus hispaniolicus De Andrade, 1998

= Acanthostichus hispaniolicus =

Acanthostichus hispaniolicus Temporal range: Burdigalian?

Extinct species of ant

Acanthostichus hispaniolicus is an extinct species of ant in the subfamily Dorylinae known from a group of possibly Miocene fossils found on the Caribbean island of Hispaniola. A. hispaniolicus is the first species of the ant genus Acanthostichus to have been described from fossils found in Dominican amber, and is the only species of Acanthostichus found in the West Indies.

== History and classification ==
Acanthostichus hispaniolicus is known from four fossils insects which are inclusions in a single, transparent chunk of Dominican amber. The amber was produced by the extinct Hymenaea protera, which formerly grew on Hispaniola, across northern South America and up to southern Mexico. The amber specimens, numbers Do-5205-1, Do-5205-2, Do-5205-3, and Do-5205-4; which entomb the holotype and three paratypes, are currently preserved in the Division of Invertebrate Zoology collections at the Staatliches Museum für Naturkunde Stuttgart in Stuttgart, Germany. The holotype and paratype fossils are composed of complete adult workers which were originally preserved in the same amber specimen along with a number of other insects. The specimen, now cut into smaller pieces, was collected from an undetermined amber mine, in fossil bearing rocks of the Cordillera Septentrional mountains, northern Dominican Republic. The amber dates from at least the Burdigalian stage of the Miocene, based on studying the associated fossil foraminifera and may be as old as the Middle Eocene, based on the associated fossil coccoliths. This age range is due to the host rock being secondary deposits for the amber, and the Miocene the age range is only the youngest that it might be.

The fossils were first studied by paleoentomologist Maria De Andrade of the University of Basel. De Andrade's 1998 type description of the new species was published in the Swiss journal Mitteilungen der Schweizerischen Entomologischen Gesellschaft. The specific epithet hispaniolicus is in reference island of Hispaniola where the fossil was found.

== Description ==
The Acanthostichus hispaniolicus specimens are well preserved, though each of the four show some distortion from the amber moving after entombment. The specimens have estimated body lengths between 5.72–6.64 millimetres (0.225–0.261 in). The overall coloration of A. hispaniolicus is a light orange-brown, with some darkening on the mandibles, the tarsomeres and the tarsi. The mandibles have between 6 and 8 minute teeth followed by a preapical tooth a short gap, and the apical tooth. The mouth is bracketed by a pair of three segmented labial palps and a pair of two segmented maxillary palps. The bodies have a flattened appearance in side view with a smooth and shining appearance and minute reticulation on portions of the gaster. The sting is noted to be well developed and long.
