= Cryptodidymosphaerites =

Cryptodidymosphaerites Temporal range: Ypresian–Ypresian

Scientific classification
- Kingdom: Fungi
- Division: Ascomycota
- Class: Dothideomycetes
- Order: Pleosporales
- Family: incertae sedis
- Genus: †Cryptodidymosphaerites; Currah, Stockey & LePage 1998
- Species: †C. princetonensis

Binomial name
- †Cryptodidymosphaerites princetonensis Currah, Stockey & LePage 1998

Extinct genus of fungus

Cryptodidymosphaerites is an extinct monotypic genus of pleosporale fungus of uncertain family placement. When described it contained the single species Cryptodidymosphaerites princetonensis. The genus is solely known from the Early Eocene, Ypresian aged, Princeton Chert deposit of the Allenby Formation. Cryptodidymosphaerites is one of only three described fossil fungus species found in the Princeton Chert, and is a hyperparasite of Palaeoserenomyces allenbyensis, itself a tar spot-like parasite of the fossil palm Uhlia.

== Distribution ==
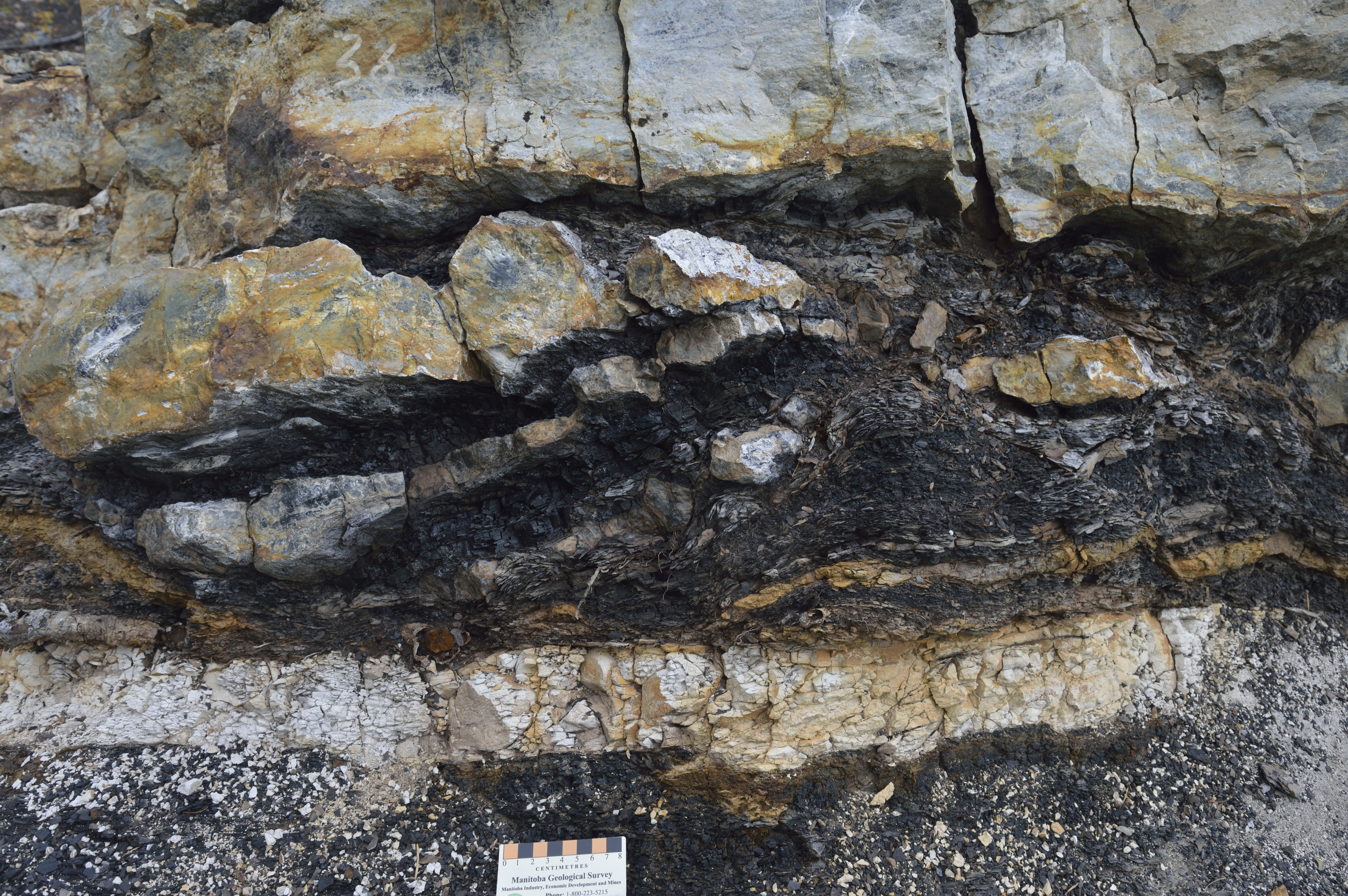
Close up of Princeton Chert outcrop showing volcanic ash (white layer at base), peaty coal (dark layer), and Chert layers (grey). Layer 36 is labelled.

Cryptodidymosphaerites princetonensis is known exclusively from the Princeton Chert, a fossil locality in British Columbia, Canada, which comprises an anatomically preserved flora of Eocene Epoch age, with rich species abundance and diversity. The chert is located in exposures of the Allenby Formation on the east bank of the Similkameen River, 8.5 km (5.3 mi) south of the town of Princeton, British Columbia.

Notable in conjunction with the coal seams of the Allenby Formation are sections of chert which formed during silica rich periods. The rapid cyclical changes from coal to chert and back are not noted in any other fossil locality in the world. An estimated 49 coal-chert cycles are known, though the exact conditions for this process are not well understood. Silica rich volcanic episodes in the region during deposition would have been needed for formation of the cherts, while slowly moving waters and gently subsiding terrains would be needed for the peats and fens to accumulate. Rates of organic deposition in swamps have been estimated at 0.5–1 mm (0.020–0.039 in) in modern temperate climates, this suggests the time needed for each 10–20 cm (3.9–7.9 in) chert layer would be at least 100 years or more, with the full sequence of cycles taking place over no more than 15,000 years.

The Allenby Formation is the southern-most of the Eocene Okanagan Highlands lakes in British Columbia, and second most southern site after the Klondike Mountain Formation of Republic, Washington in northern Ferry County. The highlands, including the Allenby Formation, have been described as one of the "Great Canadian Lagerstätten" based on the diversity, quality and unique nature of the floral and faunal biotas that are preserved. The highlands temperate biome preserved across a large transect of lakes recorded many of the earliest appearances of modern genera, while also documenting the last stands of ancient lines.

== History & classification ==
Specimens of Cryptodidymosphaerites princetonensis were first identified in serial thin section cellulose acetate peels of Uhlia allenbyensis fossils. The peels were made with hydrofluoric acid and mounted in Eukitt mounting material, than affixed to microscope slides using double sided tape. The holotype, microscope slide UAPC-ALTA P1231 B, was accessioned into the University of Alberta palaeobotanical collections. The formal description of the new genus and species was published by Randolph Currah, Ruth Stockey and Ben LePage (1998) in the journal Mycologia. Currah et al formed the genus name as a modification of the name Cryptodidymosphaeria, a synonym of the modern mycoparasitic Didymosphaeria conoidea, plus the suffix -ites denoting its status as a fossil. They chose the specific epithet princetonensis as a reference to the type locality.

The family affiliation of C. princetonensis is undetermined, with Currah, Stockey, and LePage (1998) only assigning to the order "Melanommatales". This placement is used with some fungal databases, Melanommatales now being considered a synonym of Pleosporales, while other databases only place the genus to the division Ascomycota.

== Description ==
The ascomata of Cryptodidymosphaerites princetonensis are globular in shape, ranging between 50–120 μm (0.0020–0.0047 in) in diameter. The walls of each ascocarp consist of prosenchymatous hyphae built up in several layers. Within the ascomata are 6 μm (0.00024 in) wide by 35–50 μm (0.0014–0.0020 in) long asci, each with eight ascospores. The ascospores are uniseriate and have a club shaped outline with a constriction near the equatorial septum wall.

== Paleoecology ==
Cryptodidymosphaerites princetonensis was a hyperparasite of Paleoserenomyces allenbeyensis, invading the tissue and developing in the locules of the P. allenbeyensis stromata. P. allenbeyensis is itself a parasite, invading the surface cells of Uhlia allenbyensis palm leaves resulting in areas considered to be similar to modern "tar spot" infections on leaves. The layered parasitic symbiosis of the palm and fungi suggests the relation between certain palms and tar spot forming Phyllachorales existed from at least 50 million years ago.

== Paleoenvironment ==
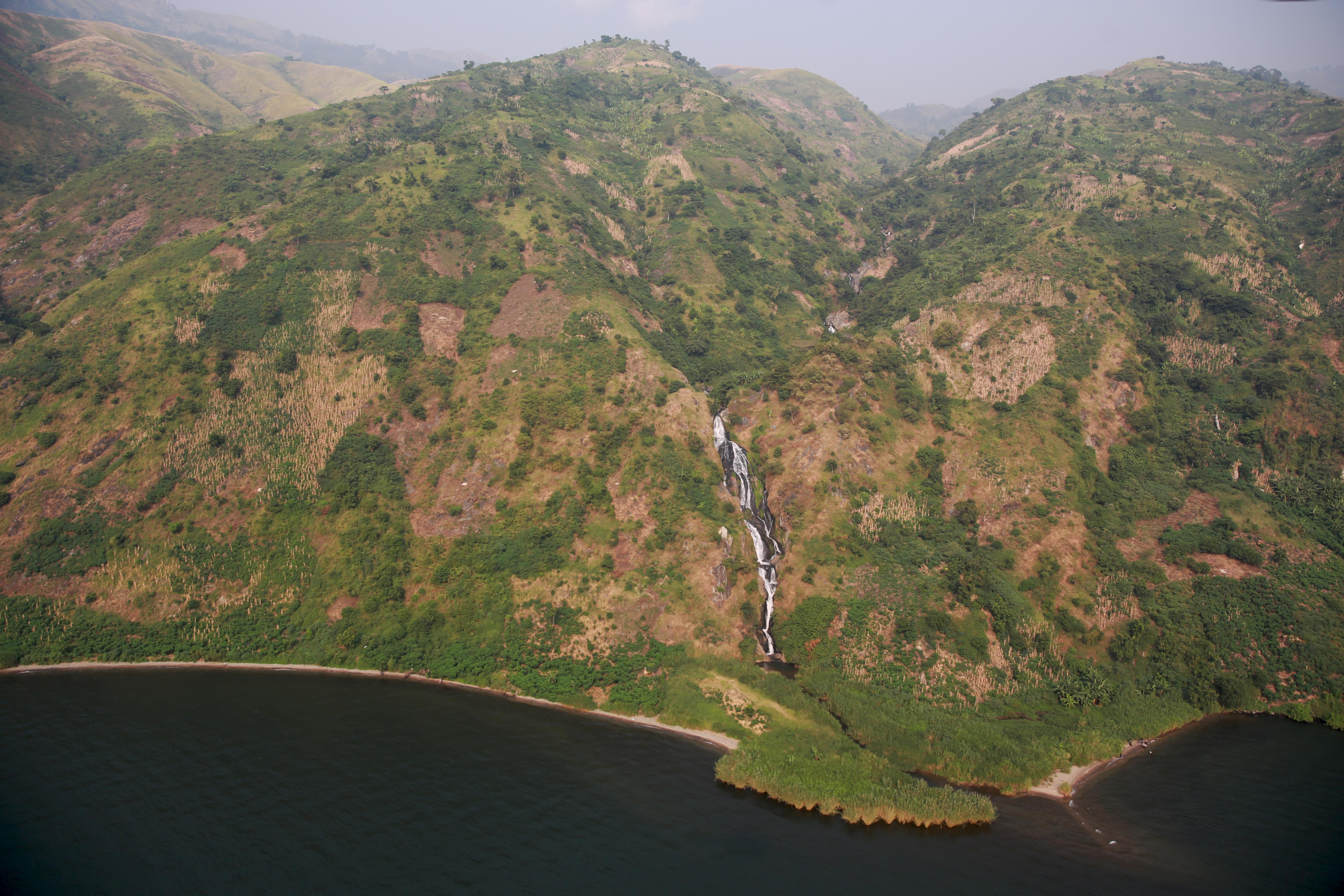
Virunga Mountains over Lake Edward

The Princeton chert preserves an aquatic system with silica rich slow moving waters which was likely a peat fen ecosystem. While other fossil producing areas of the Allenby Formation are likely the product of deep water deposition and diatomite sedimentation, the chert layers originate from shallow waters, as evidenced by plant and animal fossils. The Okanagan Highland sites, such as the Princeton chert represent upland lake systems that were surrounded by a warm temperate ecosystem with nearby volcanism. The highlands likely had a mesic upper microthermal to lower mesothermal climate, in which winter temperatures rarely dropped low enough for snow, and which were seasonably equitable. The Okanagan Highlands paleoforest surrounding the lakes have been described as precursors to the modern temperate broadleaf and mixed forests of Eastern North America and Eastern Asia. Based on the fossil biotas the lakes were higher and cooler than the coeval coastal forests preserved in the Puget Group and Chuckanut Formation of Western Washington, which are described as lowland tropical forest ecosystems. Estimates of the paleoelevation range between 0.7–1.2 km (0.43–0.75 mi) higher than the coastal forests. This is consistent with the paleoelevation estimates for the lake systems, which range between 1.1–2.9 km (1,100–2,900 m), which is similar to the modern elevation 0.8 km (0.50 mi), but higher.

Estimates of the mean annual temperature have been derived from climate leaf analysis multivariate program (CLAMP) analysis and leaf margin analysis (LMA) the Princeton paleoflora. The CLAMP results after multiple linear regressions for Princeton's gave a 5.1 °C (41.2 °F), and the LMA returned a mean annual temperature of 5.1 ± 2.2 °C (41.2 ± 4.0 °F). This is lower than the mean annual temperature estimates given for the coastal Puget Group, which is estimated to have been between 15–18.6 °C (59.0–65.5 °F). The bioclimatic analysis for Princeton suggest mean annual precipitation amount of 114 ± 42 cm (45 ± 17 in). The warm temperate uplands floras of the Allenby Formation and greater highlands in association with downfaulted lacustrine basins and active volcanism are noted to have no exact modern equivalents. This is due to the more seasonally equitable conditions of the Early Eocene, resulting in much lower seasonal temperature shifts. However, the highlands have been compared to the upland ecological islands in the Virunga Mountains within the Albertine Rift of the African rift valley.
