= Paleoserenomyces =

Scientific classification
- Domain: Eukaryota
- Kingdom: Fungi
- Division: Ascomycota
- Class: Sordariomycetes
- Order: Phyllachorales
- Family: incertae sedis
- Genus: †Paleoserenomyces; Currah, Stockey & LePage 1998
- Species: †P. allenbyensis

Binomial name
- †Paleoserenomyces allenbyensis Currah, Stockey & LePage 1998

Genus of fossil fungi

Paleoserenomyces is an extinct monotypic genus of pleosporale fungus of uncertain family placement. When described it contained the single species Paleoserenomyces allenbyensis. The genus is solely known from the Early Eocene, Ypresian aged, Princeton Chert deposit of the Allenby Formation. Palaeoserenomyces is one of only three described fossil fungus species found in the Princeton Chert, being a tar spot like parasite of the fossil palm Uhlia allenbyensis, and is host for the hyperparasite Cryptodidymosphaerites princetonensis.

== History and classification ==
The type series of fossils were first identified in serial thin section cellulose acetate peels of Uhlia allenbyensis fossils. The peels were made with hydrofluoric acid and mounted in Eukitt mounting material, than affixed to microscope slides using double sided tape. The holotype and paratype microscope slides were accessioned into the University of Alberta palaeobotanical collections and the formal description of the new genus and species was published by Randolph Currah, Ruth Stockey, and Ben LePage (1998) in the journal Mycologia. The researchers formed the genus name as combination of the name Serenomyces, a modern genus of phaeochoraceous sac fungi, plus the prefix paleo- denoting its status as a fossil. They chose the specific epithet allenbyensis as a reference to the mining ghost town of Allenby in Canada that is also the namesake of the type locality's parent formation.

The family affiliation of P. allenbyensis is undetermined, with Currah, Stockey, and LePage (1998) only assigning to the order Phyllachorales a placement which is used by some fungal databases while other databases only place the genus to the division Ascomycota.

== Description ==
Paleoserenomyces allenbyensis stromata are darker in coloration than the Uhlia allenbyensis host cells, from which the infections can be present on either the upper or lower leaf surface. The individual stomata are around 3 mm (0.12 in) thick and up to 13 cm (5.1 in) long. Stromata cell walls comprise an inner layer of column shaped cells, round in cross-section, and an outer layer of infected leaf epidermal tissue. They are polyloculate, with the 240–480 μm (0.0094–0.0189 in) around by 180–240 μm (0.0071–0.0094 in)-thick locules formed in a layer within the stromata. Each locule has an aperture formed on the tip of a round umbo, and the locule walls are formed of two to four layers of hyphae. None of the described fossil material had any sexual or asexual cells present, possibly dues to parasitization of the locules by Cryptodidymosphaerites princetonensis.

== Distribution ==
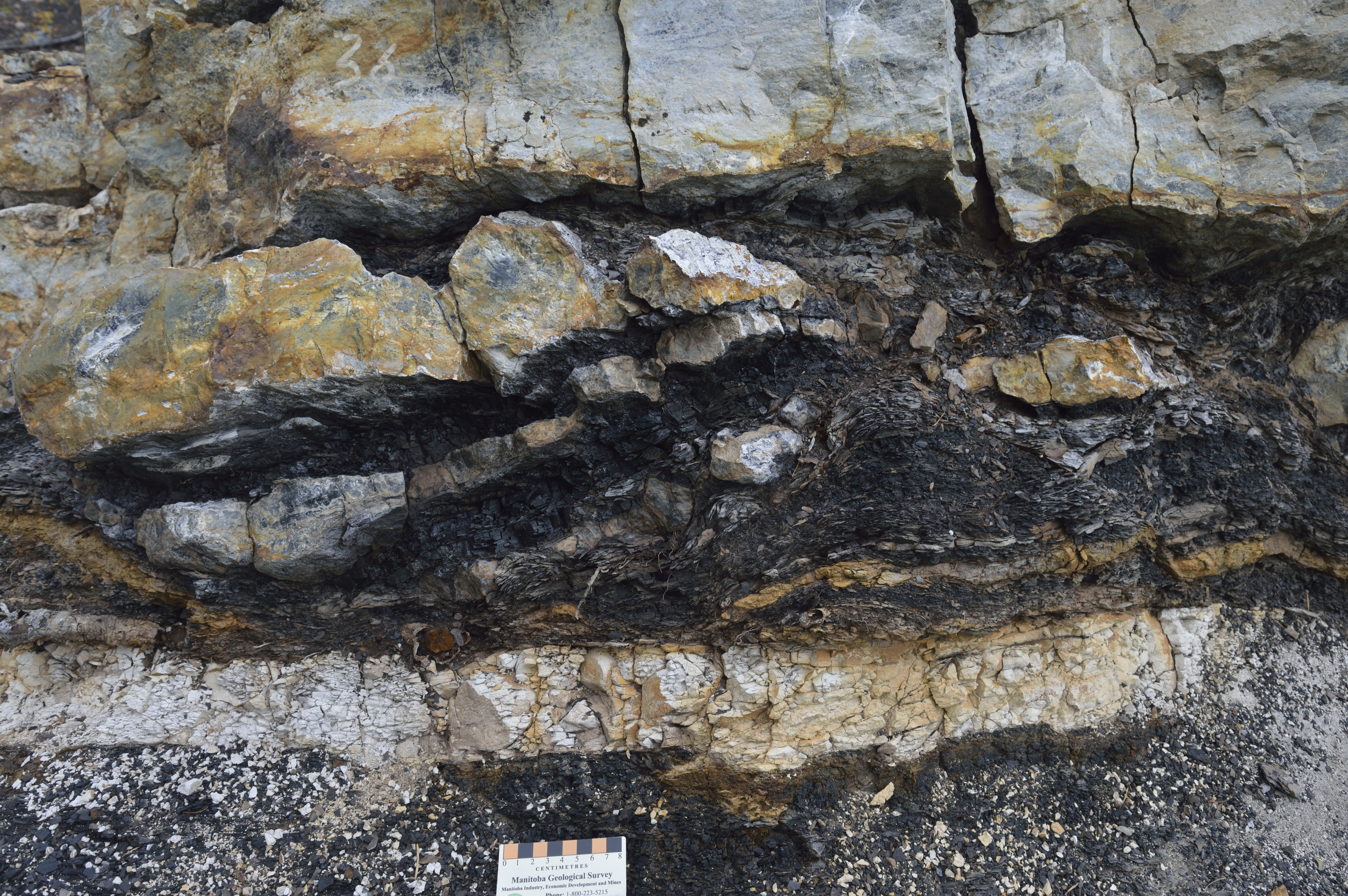
Close up of Princeton Chert outcrop showing volcanic ash (white layer at base), peaty coal (dark layer), and Chert layers (grey). Layer 36 is labelled.

Paleoserenomyces is known exclusively from the Princeton Chert, a fossil locality in British Columbia, Canada, which comprises an anatomically preserved flora of Eocene Epoch age, with rich species abundance and diversity. The chert is located in exposures of the Allenby Formation on the east bank of the Similkameen River, 8.5 km (5.3 mi) south of the town of Princeton, British Columbia.

Notable in conjunction with the coal seams of the Allenby Formation are sections of chert which formed during silica-rich periods. The rapid cyclical changes from coal to chert and back are not noted in any other fossil locality in the world. An estimated 49 coal-chert cycles are known, though the exact conditions for this process are not well understood. Silica-rich volcanic episodes in the region during deposition would have been needed for formation of the cherts, while slowly moving waters and gently subsiding terrains would be needed for the peats and fens to accumulate. Rates of organic deposition in swamps have been estimated at approximately 0.5–1 mm (0.02–0.04 in) in modern temperate climates, this suggests the time needed for each 10–20 cm (4–8 in) chert layer would be at least 100 years or more, with the full sequence of cycles taking place over no more than 15,000 years.

The Allenby Formation is one of the southern-most of the Eocene Okanagan Highlands Lagerstätten in British Columbia, with the Canadian Penticton Group at the international border and the Klondike Mountain Formation of Republic, Washington in northern Ferry County to the south. The highlands, including the Allenby Formation, have been described as one of the "Great Canadian Lagerstätten" based on the diversity, quality and unique nature of the biotas that are preserved. The Eocene Okanagan Highlands temperate-subtropical biome preserved across a large transect of lakes recorded many of the earliest appearances of modern genera, while also documenting the last stands of ancient lines.

== Paleoecology ==
Paleoserenomyces allenbeyensis was a parasitic fungus, invading the surface cells of Uhlia allenbyensis palm leaves resulting in areas considered to be similar to modern "tar spot" infections on leaves. Within the tissues of P. allenbeyensis, the hyperparasitic fungus, Cryptodidymosphaerites princetonensis would invade cells and develop within the stromata locules. The layered parasitic symbiosis of the palm and fungus suggests the relation between certain palms and tar spot forming Phyllachorales existed from at least 50 million years ago.

== Paleoenvironment ==
The Princeton chert preserves an aquatic system with silica rich slow moving waters which was likely a peat–fen ecosystem. While other fossil producing areas of the Allenby Formation are likely the product of deep water deposition and diatomite sedimentation, the chert layers originate from shallow waters, as evidenced by plant and animal fossils. The Okanagan Highland sites, such as the Princeton chert represent upland lake systems that were surrounded by a warm temperate ecosystem with nearby volcanism. The highlands likely had a mesic upper microthermal to lower mesothermal climate, in which winter temperatures rarely dropped low enough for snow, and which were seasonably equitable. The Okanagan Highlands paleoforest surrounding the lakes have been described as precursors to the modern temperate broadleaf and mixed forests of Eastern North America and Eastern Asia. Based on the fossil biotas the lakes were higher and cooler than the coeval coastal forests preserved in the Puget Group and Chuckanut Formation of Western Washington, which are described as lowland tropical forest ecosystems. Estimates of the paleoelevation range between 0.7–1.2 km (0.43–0.75 mi) higher than the coastal forests. This is consistent with the paleoelevation estimates for the lake systems, which range between 1.1–2.9 km (1,100–2,900 m), which is similar to the modern elevation 0.8 km (0.50 mi), but higher.

Estimates of the mean annual temperature have been derived from climate leaf analysis multivariate program (CLAMP) analysis and leaf margin analysis (LMA) the Princeton paleoflora. The CLAMP results after multiple linear regressions for Princeton's gave a 5.1 °C (41.2 °F), and the LMA returned a mean annual temperature of 5.1 ± 2.2 °C (41.2 ± 4.0 °F). This is lower than the mean annual temperature estimates given for the coastal Puget Group, which is estimated to have been between 15–18.6 °C (59.0–65.5 °F). The bioclimatic analysis for Princeton suggest mean annual precipitation amount of 114 ± 42 cm (45 ± 17 in). The warm temperate uplands floras of the Allenby Formation and greater highlands in association with downfaulted lacustrine basins and active volcanism are noted to have no exact modern equivalents. This is due to the more seasonally equitable conditions of the Early Eocene, resulting in much lower seasonal temperature shifts. The highlands, however, have been compared to the upland ecological islands in the Virunga Mountains within the Albertine Rift of the African rift valley.
