= Tar spot =

Tar spot may refer to:

- Phyllachora maydis, a fungus species that cause tar spot disease of maize
- Rhytisma acerinum, a fungus species that causes tar spot disease of maples
