= Paleobiota of the Latah Formation =

Organic elements preserved in Washington and Idaho lakes

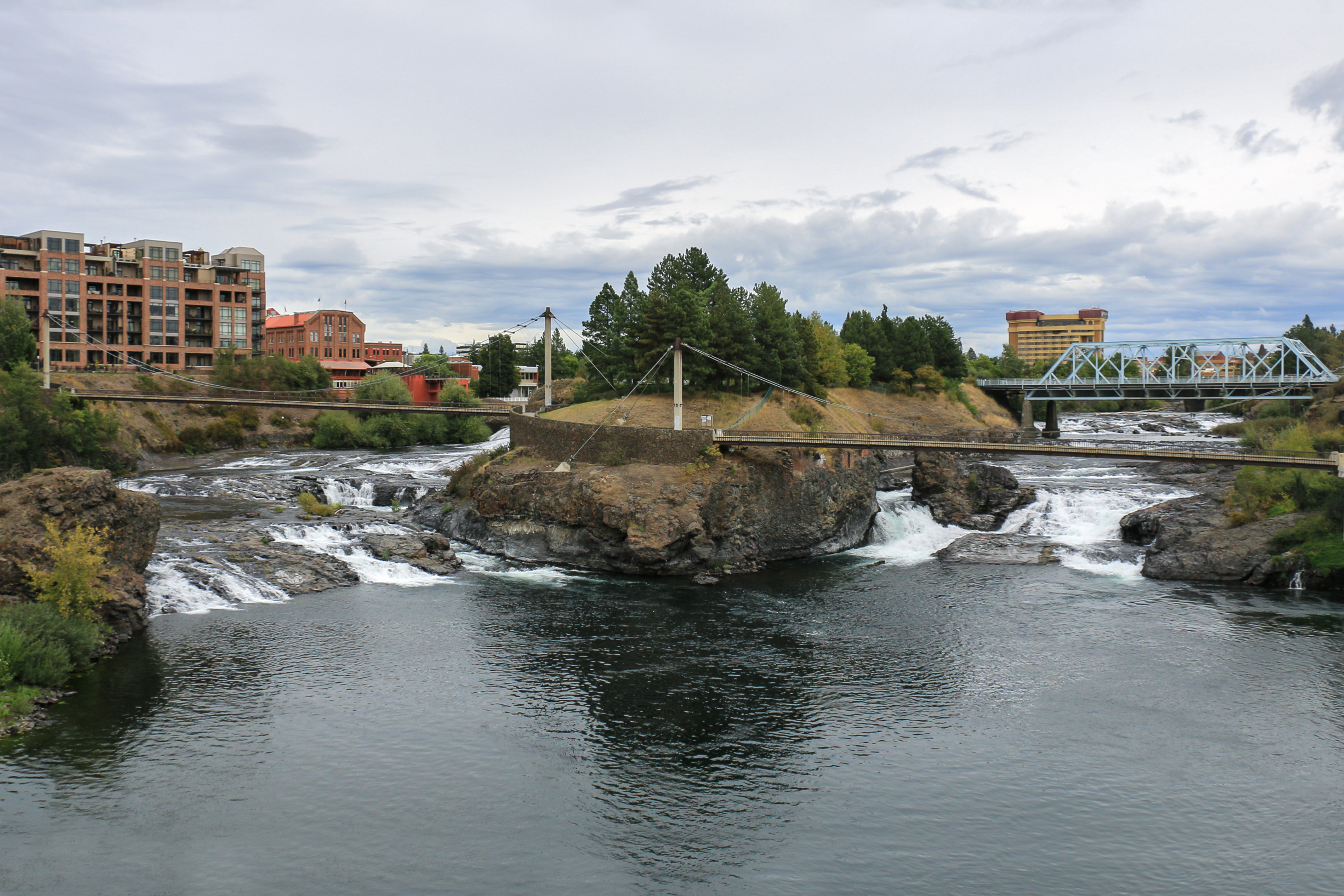
Spokane Falls, Spokane

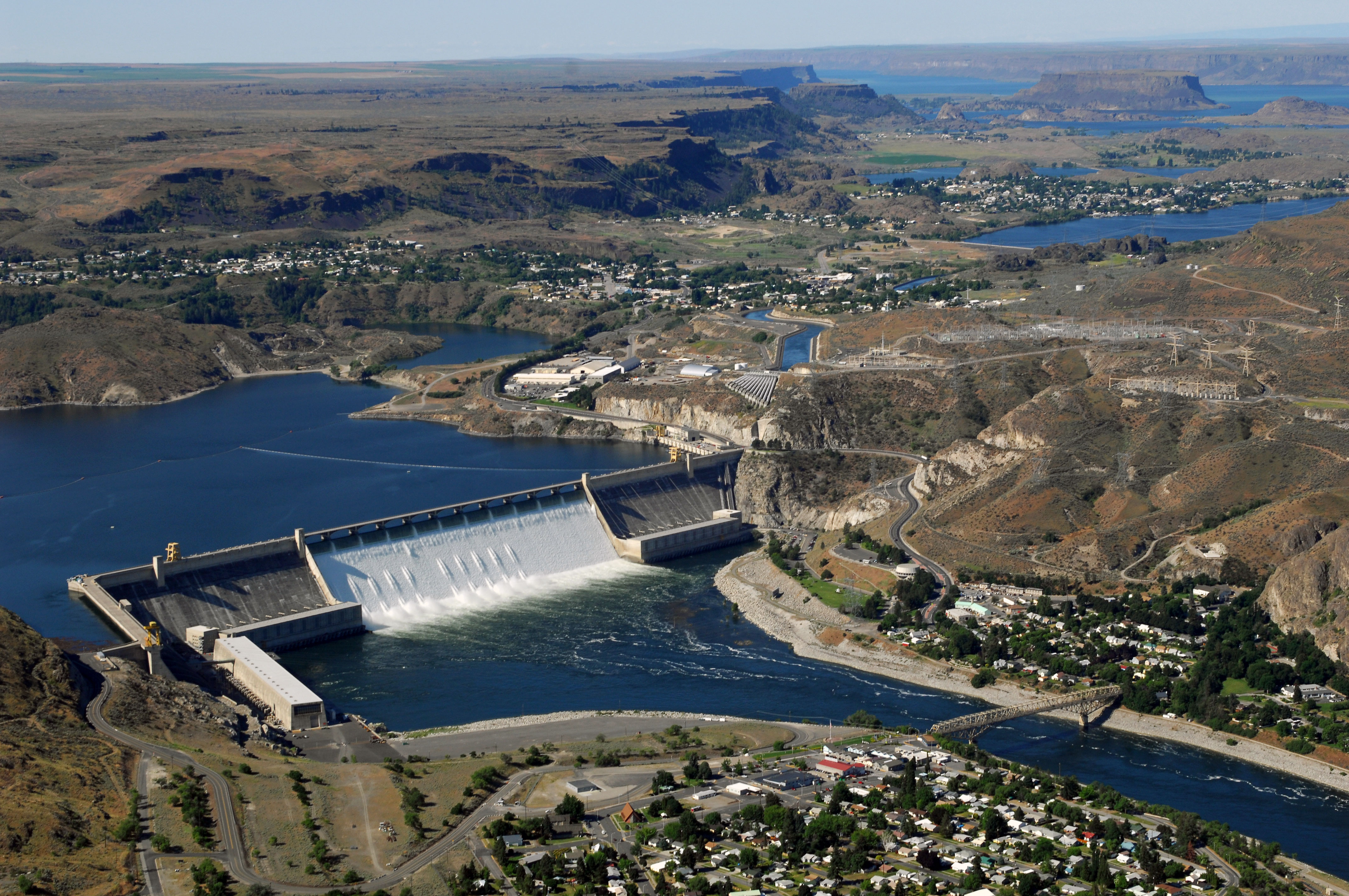
Grand Coulee Dam & Electric City

The paleobiota of the Latah Formation encompasses both floral and faunal elements preserved in temporary lacustrine environments formed between eruptive phases of the Columbia River Basalts in central to east Eastern Washington and central to north Idaho. The Latah Formation is centered around the greater Spokane area, with a western extent outcropping at Grand Coulee and the eastern margins as far southeast as the area of White Bird, Idaho. Dating of the core Spokane sites is based on the host Grande Ronde Basalts which give an age range of 16.5 to 16.1 million years ago. The Clarkia fossil beds lagerstätte site are slightly younger, being interbedded in the Wanapum Basalts Priest Rapids Member with an age constraint of 16.1 to 15.9 million years ago, or Early Barstovian in age.

The intermittent lakes were surrounded by a temperate ecosystem that was mesophytic in nature, and hosting a diverse flora with plants that are still native to the region and others now restricted to other areas of the globe. There is a small element of the flora that consists of fully extinct genera that are unique to the time and region. Based on work from sampling around Mica, Washington a diverse assembly of diatoms and algae lived in the Spokane area lakes though water conditions for growth were not ideal. The known fauna of the formation is smaller than the flora, with most taxa being insect species though one unnamed Sciuridae fossil was described in 2018, and fish belonging to the salmonid, cyprinid, and centrarchid groups are known. Preservation varies from carbonized compressions at most sites to exceptional organic preservations in some parts of the Clarkia area localities where original organic material is preserved down to living coloration and possible ancient DNA fragments. Upper layers of the Clarkia deposits have been recorded with modern fungi actively feeding on the ancient organic material of the fossils as a food source.

== Plants ==
The initial taxonomic work on the flora was undertaken by Frank Knowlton with assistance from diatom specialist Albert Mann and bryologist Elizabeth Britton. Their combined work was published as a supplemental chapter to the initial 1926 descriptive work by Joseph Pardee and Kirk Bryan. After Knowlton's death in November 1926, his revision of the Latah flora was taken over by Edward W. Berry who also erroneously included strata of the much older Klondike Mountain Formation around Republic, Washington. This error was noted and corrected in later works by Roland W. Brown. Ralph W. Cheney and Daniel I. Axelrod broke the Latah into four major florules, Grand Coulee and Spokane in Washington plus Coeur d'Alene and White Bird in Idaho, while noting several "miscellaneous" sites as well. Modern works have concentrated more on single taxa and certain florules.

=== Mosses ===
Family	Genus	Species	Author/year	Florule	Notes	Synonyms	Images
Polytrichaceae	†Polytrichites	†Polytrichites spokanensis	Britton	Spokane	A possible polytrichaceous moss		Polytrichites spokanensis
incertae sedis	†Hypnites	†Hypnites brittoniae	(Steere) Miller	Spokane	A moss of uncertain affiliation.	Archaeomnium brittoniae (1952); "Moss, genus and species (?)" of Knowlton, 1926; Paleohypnum brittoniae (1946)	Hypnites brittoniae
incertae sedis	†Hypnites	†Hypnites patens	(Britton) Miller	Spokane	A moss of uncertain affiliation	Archaeomnium patens (1926); Palaeohypnum patens (1946)	Hypnites patens

=== Lycopods ===
Family	Genus	Species	Author/year	Florule	Notes	Images
Lycopodiaceae	Lycopodium	†Lycopodium hesperium	Knowlton	Coeur d'Alene	A possible lycopod clubmoss Treated as a plant of uncertain affinity by Chaney & Axelrod 1959	Lycopodium hesperium

=== Ferns ===
Family	Genus	Species	Author/year	Florule	Notes	Synonyms	Images
Blechnaceae	Woodwardia	†Woodwardia praeradicans	Berry	Spokane	A chain fern species		Woodwardia praeradicans
Equisetaceae	Equisetum	†Equisetum alexanderi	Brown	Spokane	A horsetail species		
Dennstaedtiaceae	Pteridium	†Pteridium calabazensis	(Dorf) Graham	Misc - Alkali Creek	A Pteridium fern species	Dryopteris idahoensis (of Berry, 1934); Pteris idahoensis (1959)	
Osmundaceae	Osmunda	†Osmunda occidentalis	(Berry) Brown	Spokane	A royal fern species Not to be confused with Asplenium occidentale Knowlton (1917)	Asplenium occidentale Berry (1929); Pteris sp. Berry (1929); "Fern, fragment" of Knowlton, 1926	Osmunda occidentale
Woodsiaceae	Woodsia	†Woodsia bonseri	Berry	Spokane	A cliff fern species		Woodsia bonseri

=== Ginkgos ===
Family	Genus	Species	Author/year	Florule	Notes	Images
Ginkgoaceae	Ginkgo	†Ginkgo adiantoides	(Unger) Heer	Clarkia; Grand Coulee; Spokane	A ginkgo species	Ginkgo adiantoides

=== Conifers ===
Family	Genus	Species	Author	Florule	Notes	Synonyms	Images
Cupressaceae	Juniperus	†Juniperus sabinoides	Ashlee	White Bird	A juniper species		
Cupressaceae	Metasequoia	†Metasequoia occidentalis		Clarkia	A dawn redwood species.		
Cupressaceae	Taxodium	†Taxodium dubium	(Sternberg) Heer	Clarkia; Coeur d'Alene; Grand Coulee; Spokane; White Bird; Misc locals	A bald-cypress.	Glyptotrobus aments of Berry, 1929; Sequoia langsdorfii of Knowlton, 1926; Sequoia langsdorfii of Berry, 1929; Sequoia langsdorfii of Berry, 1931	Taxodium dubium
Cupressaceae	Tetraclinis	†Tetraclinis salicornioides var. praedecurrens	(Knowlton) Kvaček & Manchester	Clarkia; Grand Coulee; Misc-Potlatch (Julietta); Spokane; White Bird	A Tetraclinis species.	Callitris potlatchensis (1935); Fokienia praedecurrens (1959); Fokieniopsis praedecurrens (1997).; Libocedrus praedecurrens (1926); Tetraclinis potlachensis (1997)	Tetraclinis salicornioides var. praedecurrens
Cupressaceae	Thuja	†Thuja dimorpha	(Oliver) Chaney & Axelrod	Spokane			
Pinaceae	Keteleeria	†Keteleeria heterophylloides	(Berry) Brown	Spokane; Misc-Clearwater River	A Keteleeria species.	Potamogeton heterophylloides (1929)	Keteleeria heterophylloides
Pinaceae	Pinus	†Pinus harneyana	Chaney & Axelrod 1959	Spokane	A pine		Pinus harneyana
Pinaceae	Pinus	†Pinus wheeleri	Cockerell	Spokane; White Bird	A pine	Pinus monticolensis p.p.(not Republic specimens)	
Pinaceae	Tsuga	†"Tsuga latahensis"	Berry	Grand Coulee; Spokane	First described as a hemlock conescale. Suggested to be a bud scale in 1937. Treated as an incertae sedis plant by Chaney & Axelrod (1959).		Tsuga latahensis
Taxaceae	Cephalotaxus	†Cephalotaxus bonseri	(Knowlton) Cheney & Axelrod	Spokane	A yew	Torreya bonseri (1926); Tumion bonseri (1952)	Cephalotaxus bonseri

=== Basal dicots ===
Family	Genus	Species	Author	Florule	Notes	Images
Nymphaeaceae	Nymphaea	Unidentified.		Clarkia	A Nymphaea species leaf Not describable to species	

=== Monocots ===
Family	Genus	Species	Author	Florule	Notes	Synonyms	Images
Araceae	Arisaema	†Arisaema hesperia	Knowlton	Coeur d'Alene	An Arisaema species. Has been suggested as a synonym of Liquidambar pachyphyllum		Arisaema hesperia
Araceae	Lysichiton	†"Lysichiton washingtonense"	Berry	Grand Coulee	First described as a skunk cabbage. Later treated as a species of uncertain affinity.		Lysichiton washingtonense
Smilacaceae	Smilax	†Smilax magna	Chaney	Spokane; White Bird	A green briar species	Aristolochia White Birdensis Ashlee (1932); Smilax lamarensis non Knowlton nec Berry (1929)	Smilax magna
Smilacaceae	Smilax	†Smilax praelaurifolia	Ashlee	Misc	A green briar species		
Typhaceae	Typha	†Typha lesquereuxi	Cockerell	Spokane; Misc - Arrow Junct.	A cattail species	Typha sp. of Knowlton, 1926	Typha lesquereuxi
Unidentified	Unidentified	Unidentified		Spokane	A poaceous like leaf. Knowlton did not consider Latah Formation leaves as name-able.		unnamed "Grass" leaf
Unidentified	Unidentified	Unidentified		Spokane	Possibly a poalean plant Suggested to be a low-growing "grass"		Grass?, genus? of Knowlton 1926

=== Magnoliids ===
Family	Genus	Species	Author	Florule	Notes	Synonyms	Images
Lauraceae	Machilus	†Machilus americana	Brown	Spokane	A Machilus species		
Lauraceae	Machilus	†Machilus asiminoides	Brown	Spokane	A Machilus species		
Lauraceae	Persea	†Persea lanceolata	(Berry) Brown	Grand Coulee; Misc-Clearwater River; Misc-Juliaetta; Spokane; White Bird	An avocado species	Laurus similis (non-typic); Umbellularia lanceolata (1929)	Persea lanceolata
Lauraceae	Umbellularia	Umbellularia saliciformis	(Knowlton & Cockerell) LaMotte	Grand Coulee; Spokane	A pepperwood species.	Laurus similis non Knowlton nec Berry, (1929); Leguminosites bonseri Berry, 1929 (1929); Quercus simulata non Knowlton nec Berry, (1929); Umbellularia dayana non Knowlton nec Brown (1937)	Umbellularia saliciformis
Magnoliaceae	Liriodendron	†Liriodendron hesperia	Berry	Clarkia; Spokane; White Bird	A tulip tree species		Liriodendron hesperia
Magnoliaceae	Magnolia	†Magnolia dayana	Cockerell	Grand Coulee; Misc-Juliaetta; Misc-St Maries; Spokane; White Bird	A magnolia species	Hicoria washingtoniana (1931); Laurus grandis of Knowlton, 1926; Laurus grandis of Berry, 1929; Laurus grandis of Berry, 1934; Laurus princeps of Knowlton, 1926	Magnolia dayana
Magnoliaceae	Magnolia	†Magnolia latahensis	(Berry) Brown	Spokane	A magnolia species	Apocynophyllum latahense (1929); Magnolia californica of Berry, 1929	Magnolia latahensis

=== Ceratophyllales ===
Family	Genus	Species	Author	Florule	Notes	Images
Ceratophyllaceae	Ceratophyllum	†"Ceratophyllum praedemersum"	Ashlee	Spokane	First described as a Ceratophyllum; Reidentified as a possible immature platanaceous fruiting axis.	

=== Basal eudicots ===
Family	Genus	Species	Author	Florule	Notes	Synonyms	Images
Berberidaceae	Mahonia	†Mahonia simplex	(Newberry) Arnold	Misc-Elk River; Misc-Weiser	An oregon grape species.	Ilex latahensis (1932); Odostemon simplex of Berry, 1934	
Platanaceae	Platanus	†Platanus dissecta	Lesquereux	Clarkia; Coeur d'Alene; Grand Coulee; Misc-Alkali Creek; Misc-Linson Valley; Misc-St. Maries; Spokane; White Bird	A Platanus subg. Platanus sycamore leaf species.	Acer merriami of Berry, 1929 & 1934	Platanus dissecta
Platanaceae	Platanus	†Platanus emryi	Huegele, Spielbauer, & Manchester	Emerald Creek	A Platanus subg. Platanus sycamore fruit species.	Platanus sp fruit of Ashlee, 1932	
Trochodendraceae	Trochodendron	†Trochodendron rosayi	Manchester, Pigg, & DeVore	Emerald Creek	A Trochodendron fruit species.		
?Trochodendraceae	†Nordenskioldia	†Nordenskioldia interglacialis	(Hollick) Manchester, Crane, & Dilcher	Clarkia; Grand Coulee; Spokane; White Bird	A stem-group trochodendralean fruit species. Likely fruits of the leaf species Zizyphoides auriculata	Carpites interglacialis (1952); Carpites menthoides (1926); "Equisetum underground stems" (1926); Malva? hesperia (1926); Phyllites amplexicaulis (1926)	Nordenskioldia interglacialis
?Trochodendraceae	†Zizyphoides	†Zizyphoides auriculata	(Heer) Manchester, Crane, & Dilcher	Clarkia; Grand Coulee; Misc-Arrow Junction; Misc-Clearwater River; Misc-Juliaetta; Misc-St Marie; Spokane; White Bird	A stem-group trochodendralean leaf species. Likely fruits of the fruit species Nordenskioldia interglacialis	Cebatha heteromorpha (1926); Cocculus heteromorpha (1946); Populus heteromorpha (1926); Populus fairii (1926)	Zizyphoides auriculata

=== Superasterids - basal ===
Family	Genus	Species	Author	Florule	Notes	Synonyms	Images
Cornaceae	Cornus	†Cornus becki	Berry	Grand Coulee	A dogwood species.		
Cornaceae	Cornus	†Cornus latahense	Chaney and Axelrod	Spokane	A dogwood species.	Cornus ovalis of Brown, 1937	
Ebenaceae	Diospyros	†Diospyros oregoniana	(Lesquereux) Chaney & Axelrod	Grand Coulee; Spokane; White Bird	A persimmon species	Diospyros andersonae (1926)	Diospyros oregoniana
Ebenaceae	†Remberella	†Remberella microcalyx	(Knowlton) Manchester & Judd, 2024	Clarkia; Emerald Creek; Spokane; Misc-Oviatt Creek	A probable ebenaceous flower.	Porana microcalyx (1929); Diospyros? microcalyx (1926)	Remberella microcalyx
Ericaceae	Arctostaphylos	†Arctostaphylos spatulata	Berry	Spokane	A manzanita species Deemed incertae sedis without commentary (1959)		Arctostaphylos spatulata
Ericaceae	Gaultheria	†Gaultheria pacifica	Brown	Spokane-Brickyard	A Gaultheria species		
Ericaceae	†Juddicarpon	†Juddicarpon benewahensis	Smith & Manchester	Clarkia	A vaccinioid fruit.		
Ericaceae	Kalmia?	†Kalmia (?) elongata	Ashlee	Misc-Elk River	A Kalmia species		
Ericaceae	Rhododendron	†Rhododendron knowltoni	Berry	Spokane	A Rhododendron species	Menziesia knowltoni (1929)	Rhododendron knowltoni
Ericaceae	Vaccinium	†Vaccinium bonseri	Berry	Spokane	A Vaccinium species One named subspecies/variety V. b. serrulatum		Vaccinium bonseri
Ericaceae	Vaccinium	†Vaccinium sophoroides	Knowlton	Coeur d'Alene	First named as a huckleberry leaf species Synonymized into Vaccinium americanum (1929); Resurrected as incertae sedis (1959)		Vaccinium salicoides
Ericaceae	Vaccinium	†Vaccinium sophoroides	(Knowlton) Brown	Coeur d'Alene; Misc-Juliaetta; Spokane	A Vaccinium species	Arctostaphylos knowltoni (1929); Cassia sophoroides (1929); Diospyros princetoniana of Berry, 1929; Phyllites sophoroides (1926); Salix perplexa p. p.	Vaccinium sophoroides
Hydrangeaceae	Hydrangea	†Hydrangea knowltoni	(Berry) Chaney & Axelrod	Grand Coulee; Spokane; White Bird	A hydrangea species	Euonymus knowltoni (1929); Hydrangea bendirei of Knowlton, 1926, Berry, 1929, Brown, 1937; Gordonia hesperia p. p.; Ternstroemites idahoensis of Berry, 1929	Hydrangea knowltoni
Hydrangeaceae	Philadelphus	†Philadelphus pardeei	(Knowlton) Brown	Spokane	A mock-orange species	Phyllites pardeei (1926); Phyllites peculiaris (1926)	Philadelphus pardeei
Loasaceae	Mentzelia	†Mentzelia occidentalis	(Berry) Brown	Spokane; Misc-Julietta; Misc-Potlatch River; White Bird	A stickleaf species	Hibiscus? occidentalis (1929)	Mentzelia occidentalis
Nyssaceae	Nyssa	†Nyssa hesperia	Berry	Grand Coulee; Misc-Linson Valley; Spokane; White Bird	A tuplo species of the N. sylvatica complex.	Magnolia spectabilis of Brown, 1938	
Nyssaceae	Nyssa	†Nyssa magnifica	(Knowlton) Berry	Grand Coulee; Spokane	A tuplo species of the N. javanica complex.	Carpites magnifica (1926)	Nyssa magnifica
Oleaceae	Fraxinus	†Fraxinus dayana	Chaney & Axelrod	White Bird	An ash species.		
Oleaceae	Fraxinus	†Fraxinus idahoensis	Brown	Misc-Potltach Creek; White Bird	A ash species.	Fraxinus? sp. of Berry, 1934	
Styracaceae	Halesia	†Halesia columbiana	Brown	Spokane-Brickyard	A silverbell fruit species		
Theaceae	Gordonia	†Gordonia idahoensis	(Knowlton) Berry	Grand Coulee; misc-juliaetta; Spokane; White Bird	A Gordonia species.	Arbutus idahoensis (1937); Carpites paulownia (1926); Celastrus spokanensis (1929); Gordonia hesperia (1929) p. p.; Laurus grandis of Knowlton 1926 p. p.; Laurus princeps of Berry 1929; Myrica? idahoensis (1898); Myrica lanceolata p. p.	Gordonia idahoensis

=== Superasterids ===
Family	Genus	Species	Author	Florule	Notes	Synonyms	Images
Viburnaceae	Viburnum	†Viburnum fernquisti	Berry	Coeur d'Alene; Grand Coulee; Spokane	A Viburnum seed morphospecies.		Viburnum fernquisti
Viburnaceae	Viburnum	†Viburnum lantanafolium	Berry	Spokane	A Viburnum species.	Aesculus hesperia (1929); Rhamnus idahoensis p. p.	Viburnum lantanafolium
Viburnaceae	Viburnum	†Viburnum ribesiforme	LaMotte	Coeur d'Alene; Grand Coulee; Spokane	A Viburnum species.	Ribes fernquisti (1929); Viburnum fernquisti of Brown 1937	Viburnum ribesiforme
Apiaceae	†Umbelliferospermum	†Umbelliferospermum latahense	Berry	Spokane	An apiaceous winged fruit morphogenus.		Umbelliferospermum latahense
Aquifoliaceae	Ilex	†Ilex fulva	MacGinitie	Spokane	A holly species.		

=== Superrosids - Basal ===
Family	Genus	Species	Author	Florule	Notes	Synonyms	Images
Altingiaceae	Liquidambar	†Liquidambar pachyphyllum	Knowlton	Grand Coulee; Misc-Arrow Junction; Spokane; White Bird	A sweet gum species.	Arisaema hesperia (1926)?	Liquidambar pachyphyllum
Hamamelidaceae	Exbucklandia	†Exbucklandia oregonensis	(Chaney) Brown	Coeur d'Alene; Grand Coulee; Misc-Cove; Spokane; White Bird	An Exbucklandia species	Cercus spokanensis non Knowlton nec Brown (1937) p.p.; Ficus washingtonensis Knowlton (1926); Meibomites lucens Knowlton (1926); Meibomites knowltoni Berry (1929)	Exbucklandia oregonensis
Vitaceae	Vitis	†Vitis bonseri	Berry	Coeur d'Alene; Grand Coulee; Misc-Arrow Junct.; Misc-Juliaetta; White Bird	A grape species.		
Vitaceae	Vitis	†Vitis washingtonensis	(Knowlton) Brown	Coeur d'Alene; Grand Coulee; Spokane; White Bird; Misc-Oviat Creek	A grape species.	Acer merriami p. p.; Cercis idahoensis p. p.; Cercis sp. of Ashlee, 1932; Menispermites latahensis (1929); Populus lindgreni p. p.; Populus washingtonensis (1926)	Vitis washingtonensis

=== Superrosids - Fabids ===
Family	Genus	Species	Author	Florule	Notes	Synonyms	Images
Betulaceae	Alnus	†Alnus fairii	(Knowlton) Wolfe	Coeur d'Alene; Grand Coulee; Misc-Arrow Junct.; Spokane; White Bird	An alder.	Betula bryani (1937); Betula nanoides (1934); Betula fairii (1926); Betula heteromorpha of Berry, 1931; Betula heteromorpha of Berry, 1934; Betula largei of Berry, 1931	Betula fairii
Betulaceae	Alnus	†Alnus largei	(Knowlton) Wolfe	Coeur d'Alene; Grand Coulee; Misc-Clearwater River; Misc-St Maries; Spokane; White Bird	A birch	Betula heteromorpha of Berry, 1931; Betula largei (1966)	Alnus largei
Betulaceae	Alnus	†Alnus hollandiana	Jennings	Coeur d'Alene; Spokane	An alder	Alnus prerhombifolia; Prunus rustii p. p.	Alnus hollandiana
Betulaceae	Alnus	†Alnus relatus	(Knowlton) Brown	Coeur d'Alene; Grand Coulee; Spokane; White Bird	An alder	Phyllites relatus (1926); Prunus rustii non Knowlton nec. Berry (1929)	Alnus relatus
Betulaceae	Betula	†Betula thor	Knowlton	Spokane	A birch		Betula thor
Betulaceae	Betula	†Betula vera	Brown	Spokane	A birch		
Betulaceae	Ostrya	†Ostrya oregoniana	Chaney	Spokane	A hophornbeam		
Celastraceae	Euonymus	†Euonymus pacificus	Brown	Spokane	A wintercreeper species		
Fabaceae	Caesalpinia	†Caesalpinia spokanensis	(Knowlton) Herendeen & Dilcher	Clarkia; Coeur d'Alene; Spokane; White Bird; Misc - Elk River	A Caesalpinia fruit Possibly the fruits belonging to Sophora spokanensis	Cercis? spokanensis (1926); Cercis idahoensis (1930); Cercidium hesperium (1932); Gleditsia praeaquatica (1932)	Caesalpinia spokanensis
Fabaceae	Cercis	Unnamed	Brown	Spokane	Leaves first placed as Cercis spokanensis In need of redescription and renaming	Cercis spokanensis of Brown, 1937	
Fabaceae	†Leguminosites	†Leguminosites alexanderi	Berry	Spokane	A fabaceous fruit species		Leguminosites alexanderi
Fabaceae	Robinia?	†Robinia (?) idahoensis	Ashlee	Misc-Grangerville Mtn	A fabaceous fruit species		
Fabaceae	Sophora	†Sophora spokanensis	Knowlton	Coeur d'Alene; Grand Coulee; Misc-Juliaetta; Spokane; White Bird	A Sophora species. Possibly the leaves belonging to Caesalpinia spokanensis	Cassia spokanensis; Quercus treleasi; Sophora alexanderi (1926)	Sophora spokanensis
Fagaceae	Castanea	†Castanea spokanensis	(Knowlton) Chaney & Axelrod	Grand Coulee; Misc-St Maries; Spokane; White Bird	A Chestnut species	Castanea castaneaefolia of Knowlton, 1926; Castanea castaneaefolia of Berry, 1931; Castanea castaneaefolia of Berry, 1934; Quercus spokanensis	Castanea spokanensis
Fagaceae	Castanopsis	†Castanopsis perplexa	(Knowlton) Brown	Coeur d'Alene	A Chestnut species		Castanopsis perplexa
Fagaceae	Castanopsis	†Castanopsis spokanensis	(Brown) Chaney & Axelrod	Spokane	A chinquapin species	Tetracera spokanensis	
Fagaceae	Fagus	†Fagus pacifica	Chaney	Misc-Moscow; Misc-E. of Lewiston; White Bird	A Beech species Specimens in need of confirmation.		
Fagaceae	Fagus	†Fagus washoensis	LaMotte	Grand Coulee; Misc-Arrow junct.; Misc-Linson Valley; Spokane; White Bird	A Beech species	Amygdalus alexanderi (1929); Ostrya oregoniana of Berry, 1934; Quercus spokanensis of Berry, 1938; Ulmus speciosa of Berry, 1934	
Fagaceae	†Pseudofagus	†Pseudofagus idahoensis	Smiley & Huggins	Clarkia	A fagaceous genus		
Fagaceae	Quercus	†Quercus axelrodi	Brown	Spokane	An oak.		
Fagaceae	Quercus	†Quercus bretzi	Chaney	Spokane	An oak.		
Fagaceae	Quercus	†Quercus columbiana	Chaney	Misc ID Potlach Creek Poorman Creek	An oak.		
Fagaceae	Quercus	†Quercus dayana	Knowlton	Spokane	An oak.		
Fagaceae	Quercus	†Quercus eoprinus	Smith	Misc-Montour	An oak.	Quercus spokanensis gracilis (1934)	
Fagaceae	Quercus	†Quercus mccanni	Berry	Grand Coulee	An oak.		Quercus mccanni
Fagaceae	Quercus	†Quercus payettensis	Knowlton	Coeur d'Alene; Grand Coulee; Misc-Clearwater River; Misc-E. of Lewiston; Misc-Julietta; Spokane; White Bird	An oak.	Quercus cognatus (1926); Quercus obtusa (1926); Quercus praenigra (1926); Quercus rustii (1926)	Quercus payettensis
Fagaceae	Quercus	†Quercus pseudolyrata	Lesquereux	Grand Coulee; Misc-Moscow; Misc-Potlatch Creek; Spokane	An oak.		
Fagaceae	Quercus	†Quercus simulata	Knowlton	Coeur d'Alene; Grand Coulee; Misc-Arrow junct.; Misc-Clearwater River; Misc-E. of Lewiston; Misc-Juliaetta; Misc-Moscow; Spokane; White Bird	An oak species	Laurus princeps p. p.; Phyllites crustacea (1926); Quercus idahoensis (1898); Quercus chaneyi (1926)	Quercus simulata
Fagaceae	Quercus	Quercus sp.		Coeur d'Alene; Spokane; White Bird	Isolated acorn nuts Not described to species		Quercus sp. acorn
Fagaceae	Quercus	Quercus sp.		Coeur d'Alene; Spokane	Isolated acorn cupules Not described to species		Quercus sp. cupule
Juglandaceae	Carya	†Carya bendirei	(Lesquereux) Chaney & Axelrod	Grand Coulee; Misc-Thorn Creek; White Bird	A hickory species	Juglans egregia p.p.	Carya bendirei
Juglandaceae	†Palaeocarya	†Palaeocarya olsonii	(Brown) Manchester	Misc	A Palaeocarya species	Engelhardia olsoni	
Juglandaceae	Pterocarya	†Pterocarya mixta	(Knowlton) Brown	Spokane	A wingnut species		
Malpighiaceae	Hiraea	†Hiraea knowltoni	(Berry) Graham	Spokane	A Hiraea species.	Nyssa knowltoni of Brown, 1937	
Myricaceae	Comptonia	†Comptonia hesperia	Berry	Spokane	A sweet fern		
Myricaceae	Myrica	†Myrica ashleei	LaMotte	Misc-Elk River	A Myrica species.	Myrica idahoensis of Ashlee, 1932	
Rhamnaceae	Paliurus	†Paliurus hesperius	Berry	Clarkia?; Misc-Clearwater River; Grand Coulee; Spokane	A Paliurus species Suggested to be possible syn of †Paliurus favonii That synonymy questioned.		Paliurus hesperius
Rhamnaceae	Rhamnus	†Rhamnus columbiana	Chaney & Axelrod	Misc - Moscow	A buckthorn species		
Rosaceae	Amelanchier	†Amelanchier couleeana	(Berry) Brown	Grand Coulee; Misc-Moscow; Spokane	A service berry species	Amelanchier dignatus of Brown, 1935 p. p.; Amelanchier scudderi of Berry, 1929; Phyllites couleeanus (1931)	Amelanchier couleeana
Rosaceae	Cercocarpus	†Cercocarpus praeledifolius	Berry	Spokane	A mountain mahogany species Placement deemed incertae sedis (1959)		Cercocarpus praeledifolius
Rosaceae	Crataegus	†Crataegus latahensis	Ashlee	White Bird	A hawthorn species		
Rosaceae	Rubus	†Rubus idahoensis	Ashlee	Misc-Grangeville Mtn	A bramble species		
Salicaceae	Populus	†Populus eotremuloides	Knowlton	Misc-Arrow Junct.	A cottonwood species		
Salicaceae	Populus	†Populus lindgreni	Knowlton	Spokane-Vera; Misc-Orofino	A cottonwood species		
Salicaceae	Populus	†Populus voyana	Chaney & Axelrod	Coeur d'Alene; Spokane - Veradale	A cottonwood species		
Salicaceae	Populus	Unnamed	Berry	Spokane - Brickyard	Unnamed cottonwood species flower bracts		Populus sp.
Salicaceae	Salix	†Salix hesperia	(Knowlton) Condit	Grand Coulee; Misc-Clearwater River; Misc-Juliaetta; Misc-Moscow; Spokane; White Bird	A willow species	Cassia idahoensis (1919); Populus lesquereuxi of Berry, 1931; Quercus simulata of Berry, 1929 p.p.; Rhus typhinoides of Knowlton, 1926; Salix florissanti of Berry, 1929; Salix florissanti of Berry, 1934; Salix inquirenda (1926); Salix inquirenda of Berry, 1934; Salix remotidens (1926)	Salix hesperia
Salicaceae	Salix	†Salix kempffii	Ashlee	Misc-Elk River	A willow species		
Salicaceae	Salix	†Salix knowltoni	Berry	Misc-Clearwater River	A willow species		
Salicaceae	Salix	†Salix spokanensis	(Berry) Brown	Spokane	A willow species	Rhamnus spokanensis (1929); Robinia? sp. (1926); Phyllites sp. (1926); Quercus sp. (1929); Vaccinium spokanense (1929)	Salix spokanensis
Salicaceae	Salix	Unnamed	Berry	Spokane - Brickyard	Unnamed willow species stipules		Salix sp.
Ulmaceae	†Cedrelospermum	†Cedrelospermum lineatum	(Lesquereux) Manchester	Misc-Juliaetta	An ulmaceous species.	Ulmus brownelli of Berry, 1934	
Ulmaceae	Ulmus	†Ulmus newberryi	Knowlton	Spokane	Elm species fruits. Not reassessed by Tanai & Wolfe (1977)	Ulmus sp. (fruits) (1929)	Ulmus newberryi
Ulmaceae	Ulmus	†Ulmus moorei	Chaney & Elias	Misc-N of Weiser	An Elm species	Fagopsis longifolia of Berry, 1934	
Ulmaceae	Ulmus	†Ulmus speciosa	Newberry	Grand Coulee; Spokane; White Bird; Misc-Arrow junction	An Elm species		Ulmus speciosa
Ulmaceae	Zelkova	†Zelkova browni	Tanai & Wolfe	Spokane	An Elm species	Fagopsis longifolia of Berry, 1929; Ulmus fernquisti (1926); Zelkova oregoniana (1937)	Zelkova browni

=== Superrosids - Malvids ===
Family	Genus	Species	Author	Florule	Notes	Synonyms	Images
Lythraceae	Trapa	†Trapa americana	Knowlton	Juliaetta		A water caltrop species	Trapa americana
Malvaceae	†Florissantia	†Florissantia speirii	(Lesquereux) MacGinitie	Spokane	A malvalean flower.		
Malvaceae	Tilia	†Tilia aspera	(Newberry) LaMotte	Misc-Arrow junction; Spokane	A linden species	Platanus aspera (1883); Tilia hesperia (1929)	Tilia aspera
Meliaceae	Cedrela	†Cedrela pteraformis	(Berry) Brown	Coeur d'Alene; Grand Coulee; Misc-Juliaetta; Spokane; White Bird	A Cedrela.	synonymy: Carpolithes pteraformis (1929); Cassia spokanensis (1929); Gordonia pteraformis (1929); Rhus merrilli of Berry, 1934; Sapindus armstrongi (1929); Umbellularia dayana of Berry (1929)	Cedrela pteraformis
Rutaceae	Ptelea	†Ptelea miocenica	Berry	Grand Coulee; Spokane; White Bird	A Ptelea species	Nyssa knowltoni (1929)	Ptelea miocenica
Sapindaceae	Acer	†Acer browni	Wolfe & Tanai	Spokane - Veradale	An Acer species		
Sapindaceae	Acer	†Acer busamarum subsp. fingerrockense	Wolfe & Tanai	Clarkia	An Acer species		
Sapindaceae	Acer	†Acer chaneyi	Knowlton	Clarkia; Coeur d'Alene; Misc-Juliaetta; Grand Coulee; Spokane - Veradale	An Acer leaf morphospecies Most likely the leaves belonging to Acer gigas	Acer bendirei p.p.; Acer glabroides p.p.; Acer merriami of Berry, 1931; Quercus pseudolyrata of Knowlton, 1926	Acer chaneyi
Sapindaceae	Acer	†Acer gigas	Knowlton	Clarkia	An Acer fruit morphospecies Most likely the fruits belonging to Acer chaneyi		Acer gigas
Sapindaceae	Acer	†Acer knolli	Wolfe & Tanai	Spokane	An Acer species	Acer oregonianum of Berry, 1929	Acer knolli
Sapindaceae	Acer	†Acer latahense	Wolfe & Tanai	Spokane - Veradale	An Acer species	Acer glabroides p.p.	
Sapindaceae	Acer	†Acer medianum	Knowlton	Grand Coulee; Spokane	An Acer species	Acer bolanderi p.p.	
Sapindaceae	Acer	†Acer niklasi	Wolfe & Tanai	Clarkia; Spokane	An Acer species		
Sapindaceae	Acer	†Acer smileyi	Wolfe & Tanai	Clarkia	An Acer species		
Sapindaceae	Acer	†Acer tigilense	Chelebaeva	Spokane	An Acer species	Acer bendirei p.p.; Acer glabroides p.p.; Acer minor of Berry, 1929	Acer tigilense
Sapindaceae	Acer	†Acer whitebirdense	(Ashlee) Wolfe & Tanai	Grand Coulee; Misc-Juliaetta; Spokane; White Bird	An Acer species	Viburnum whitebirdensis (1932); Acer florissanti of Berry, 1934; Acer oregonianum of Berry, 1934; Acer osmonti of Brown, 1937; Platanus dissectaBerry, 1934; Acer glabroides p.p.	Acer whitebirdense
Sapindaceae	Dilodendron	†Dilodendron boreale	Brown	Spokane	A Dilodendron species		

=== incertae sedis ===
Family	Genus	Species	Author	Florule	Notes	Synonyms	Images
Incertae sedis	†Carpites	†Carpites boraginoides	Knowlton	Coeur d'Alene; Grand Coulee; Spokane; White Bird	Seeds or nutlets of uncertain affinity Possibly boraginaceous or malvaceous?	Carpolithes hibiscoides (1935)	Carpites boraginoides
Incertae sedis	†Carpites	†Carpites ginkgoides	Knowlton	Grand Coulee; Spokane	A fruit/seed on a "fleshy" axis Strongly similar to modern Ginkgo biloba fruits.		Carpites ginkgoides
Incertae sedis	†Carpites	†Carpites polygonoides	Knowlton	Spokane	Possible seeds or fruits Reminiscent of Rumex fruits		Carpites polygonoides
Incertae sedis	†Carpites	†Carpites spokanensis	Knowlton	Grand Coulee; Spokane	A seed or other reproductive organ Brown suggested as bud scales		Carpites spokanensis
Incertae sedis	†Ozakia	†Ozakia emryi	Manchester & Uemura	Misc - Emerald Creek	A winged fruit An eudicot of uncertain affinity		

== Fungi ==
The Clarkia outcrops is noted for exceptionally good palynological preservation, with a number of fungal palynomorphs preserved at the sites.

Order	Family	Genus	Species	Florule	Notes	Images
Amphisphaeriales	Cf. Apiosporaceae	indeterminate	indeterminate	Clarkia		Cf. Apiosporaceae
Chaetosphaeriales	Chaetosphaeriaceae	Cf. Catenularia	indeterminate	Clarkia		Cf. Catenularia sp.
Coronophorales	incertae sedis	Sphaerodes	indeterminate	Clarkia		Sphaerodes sp.
Dothideomycetes	incertae sedis	Bactrodesmium	Aff. B. abruptum	Clarkia		Bactrodesmium aff. abruptum
Dothideomycetes	incertae sedis	Bactrodesmium	indeterminate	Clarkia		Bactrodesmium sp.
Helotiales	Helotiaceae	Bispora	indeterminate	Clarkia		Bispora sp.
Hysteriales	Hysteriaceae	Cf. Acrogenospora	indeterminate	Clarkia		Cf. Acrogenospora sp.
Minutisphaerales	Minutisphaeraceae	Minutisphaera	indeterminate	Clarkia		Minutisphaera sp.
Pleosporales	Dictyosporiaceae	Dictyocheirospora	indeterminate	Clarkia		Dictyocheirospora sp.
Pleosporales	Didymosphaeriaceae	Cf. Didymosphaeria	indeterminate	Clarkia		Cf. Didymosphaeria sp.
Pleosporales	Roussoellaceae	Neoroussoella	indeterminate	Clarkia		Neoroussoella sp.
Savoryellales	Savoryellaceae	Cf. Helicoon	indeterminate	Clarkia		Cf. Helicoon sp.
Sordariales	Chaetomiaceae	Chaetomium	indeterminate	Clarkia		Chaetomium sp.
Sordariales	Chaetomiaceae	Trichocladium	indeterminate	Clarkia		Trichocladium sp.
Sordariales	Lasiosphaeriaceae	Cf. Bombardioidea	indeterminate	Clarkia		Cf. Bombardioidea sp.
Sordariales	Naviculisporaceae	Naviculispora	indeterminate	Clarkia		Naviculispora sp.
Sordariales	Neoschizotheciaceae	Cf. Cercophora	indeterminate	Clarkia		Cf. Cercophora sp.
Sordariales	Podosporaceae	Podospora	indeterminate	Clarkia		Podospora sp.
Sordariales	incertae sedis	Brachysporiella	indeterminate	Clarkia		Brachysporiella sp.
Cf. Sordariales	indeterminate	indeterminate	indeterminate	Clarkia		Cf. Sordariales
Tubeufiales	Tubeufiaceae	Pendulispora	indeterminate	Clarkia		Pendulispora sp.
Xenospadicoidales	Xenospadicoidaceae	Spadicoides	S. sp. 1.	Clarkia		Spadicoides sp. 1
Xenospadicoidales	Xenospadicoidaceae	Spadicoides	S. sp. 2.	Clarkia		Spadicoides sp. 2
Xylariales	Xylariaceae	Cf. Rosellinia	indeterminate	Clarkia		Cf. Rosellinia sp.
Xylariales	Xylariaceae	indeterminate	indeterminate	Clarkia		Xylariaceae sp.
incertae sedis	Diporothecaceae	Diporotheca	Aff. D. rhizophila	Clarkia		Diporotheca aff. rhizophila
incertae sedis	incertae sedis	Acarocybiopsis	indeterminate	Clarkia		Acarocybiopsis sp.
incertae sedis	incertae sedis	Cf. Brachydesmiella	indeterminate	Clarkia		Cf. Brachydesmiella sp.
incertae sedis	incertae sedis	Desertella	indeterminate	Clarkia		Desertella sp.
incertae sedis	incertae sedis	Endophragmia	indeterminate	Clarkia		Endophragmia sp.
incertae sedis	incertae sedis	Endophragmiopsis	indeterminate	Clarkia		Endophragmiopsis sp.
incertae sedis	incertae sedis	Endophragmiella	indeterminate	Clarkia		Endophragmiella sp.
incertae sedis	incertae sedis	Helensiella	indeterminate	Clarkia		Helensiella sp.
incertae sedis	incertae sedis	Cf. Hermatomyces	indeterminate	Clarkia		Cf. Hermatomyces sp.
incertae sedis	incertae sedis	Hughesinia	indeterminate	Clarkia		Hughesinia sp.
incertae sedis	incertae sedis	Cf. Lemkea	indeterminate	Clarkia		Cf. Lemkea sp.
incertae sedis	incertae sedis	Melanocephala	indeterminate	Clarkia		Melanocephala sp.
incertae sedis	incertae sedis	Cf. Melanographium	indeterminate	Clarkia		Cf. Melanographium sp.
incertae sedis	incertae sedis	Phragmocephala	indeterminate	Clarkia		Phragmocephala sp.
incertae sedis	incertae sedis	Cf. Polytretophora	indeterminate	Clarkia		Cf. Polytretophora sp.
incertae sedis	incertae sedis	Seychellomyces	indeterminate	Clarkia		Seychellomyces sp.

== Insects ==
Order	Family	Genus	Species	Author/year	Florule	Notes	Images
Blattodea	Hodotermitidae	†Ulmeriella	†Ulmeriella latahensis	Snyder, 1949	Spokane	A harvester termite	
Blattodea	Kalotermitidae	Eotermes	Indeterminate	1990	Misc-Juliaetta	drywood termite Not described to species	
Blattodea	Stylotermitidae	†Parastylotermes	†Parastylotermes washingtonensis	(Snyder, 1931)	Spokane	A Stylotermitid termite First named as Stylotermes washingtonensis	
Coleoptera	Anthribidae	Unidentified	Unidentified	"Smiley et al. 1975"	Clarkia	Two partial adults	
Coleoptera	Carabidae	Calosoma	†Calosoma fernquisti	Cockerell, 1925	Spokane-Deep Creek	A carabid ground beetle	Calosoma fernquisti
Coleoptera	Carabidae	Pterostichus	†Pterostichus fernquisti	Wickham, 1931	Spokane	A carabid ground beetle	
Coleoptera	Dascillidae	Dascillus?	†Dascillus? latahensis	Lewis, 1973	Spokane	A possible soft bodied plant beetle species.	
Coleoptera	Dytiscidae	Dytiscus	†Dytiscus latahensis	Wickham, 1931	Spokane	A predaceous diving beetle	
Coleoptera	Elateridae	Unidentified	Unidentified	"Smiley et al. 1975"	Clarkia	Two partial adults	
Coleoptera	Scarabaeidae	Unidentified	Unidentified	"Smiley et al. 1975"	Clarkia	A single whole adult.	
Diptera	Anisopodidae	Sylvicola	†Sylvicola carolae	(Lewis) Evenhuis, 1994	Misc-Juliaetta	A wood gnat First described as Anisopus carolae (1969)	
Diptera	Bombyliidae	Incertae sedis	†"Anthrax" dentoni	Lewis, 1969	Spokane	First identified as an Anthrax species bee fly Redescribed as Bombyliidae incertae sedis (2015)	
Diptera	Bibionidae	Bibio	†Bibio latahensis	Lewis, 1969	Misc-Juliaetta	A march fly	
Diptera	Bibionidae	Bibio	†Bibio testeus	Lewis, 1969	Misc-Juliaetta	A march fly	
Diptera	Bibionidae	Bibio	Indeterminate	1969	Spokane	An unidentified march fly	
Diptera	Bolitophilidae?	Bolitophila?	†Bolitophila pulveris	Lewis, 1969	Misc-Juliaetta	A bolitophilid gnat Considered nomen dubium	
Diptera	Mycetophilidae	Boletina	Indeterminate	1990	Misc-Juliaetta	An exechian fungus gnat	
Diptera	Mycetophilidae	Exechia	†Exechia juliaetta	Lewis, 1969	Misc-Juliaetta	An exechian fungus gnat	
Diptera	Mycetophilidae	Rymosia	†Rymosia miocenica	Lewis, 1969	Misc-Juliaetta	A rymosian fungus gnat	
Diptera	Mycetophilidae	Indeterminate	Indeterminate	1990	Misc-Juliaetta	Unidentified mycetophiline and mycetophilid fugus gnats	
Diptera	Sciaridae	Sciara	†Sciara sepulta	Lewis, 1969	Misc-Juliaetta	A sciarid fungus gnat	
Diptera	Tipulidae	Tipula	†Tipula latahensis	Lewis, 1969	Spokane	A Tipulid cranefly	
Hemiptera	Pentatomidae	Hymenarcys	†Hymenarcys cridlandi	Lewis, 1969	Spokane	A pentatomid shield bug	
Hemiptera	Saldidae	Propentacora	†Propentacora froeschneri	(Lewis) Polhemus, 1985	Misc-Juliaetta	A shore bug First described as Oreokora froeschneri (1969)	
Hemiptera	Tessaratomidae	†Latahcoris	†Latahcoris spectatus	Cockerell, 1931	Spokane	A tessaratomid giant stink bug	
Hymenoptera	Apidae	Bombus	†Bombus proavus	Cockerell, 1931	Spokane; Misc-Juliaetta	A Bumblebee	
Hymenoptera	Formicidae	Camponotus	Indeterminate	1990	Misc-Juliaetta	Unidentified carpenter ants	
Hymenoptera	Formicidae	Dolichoderus	Indeterminate	1990	Misc-Juliaetta	Unidentified Dolichoderus species ants	
Hymenoptera	Formicidae	Lasius	Indeterminate	1990	Misc-Juliaetta	Unidentified Lasius species ants	
Hymenoptera	Formicidae	Messor ?	Indeterminate	1990	Misc-Juliaetta	Unidentified possible Messor species ants	
Hymenoptera	Formicidae	Indeterminate	Indeterminate	1931	Spokane	Unidentified ants	
Hymenoptera	Ichneumonidae	Periope	†Periope ivesi	Lewis, 1969	Spokane	A metopiine ichneumonid wasp	
Hymenoptera	Ichneumonidae	Sphecophaga	Indeterminate	1990	Misc-Juliaetta	A metopiine ichneumonid wasp	
Hymenoptera	Ichneumonidae	Indeterminate	Indeterminate	1990	Misc-Juliaetta	Unidentified cryptine ichneumonid wasps	
Hymenoptera	Ichneumonidae	Indeterminate	Indeterminate	1990	Misc-Juliaetta	Unidentified pimpline ichneumonid wasps	
Hymenoptera	Megachilidae	Indeterminate	Indeterminate	1990	Misc-Juliaetta	Unidentified megachiline carpenter bees	
Hymenoptera	Tenthredinidae	Macrophya	†Macrophya adventitia	Lewis, 1969	Misc-Juliaetta	A tenthredinidae sawfly	
Lepidoptera	Nepticulidae	Indeterminate	Indeterminate	1969	"Not stated"	A pigmy moth larva blotch-mine trace fossil Hosted on an oak leaf.	
Odonata	Corduliidae	†Miocordulia	†Miocordulia latipennis	Kennedy, 1931	Spokane	A corduliid dragonfly	
Odonata	Macromiidae	Epophthalmia	†Epophthalmia biordinata	Lewis, 1969	Spokane	A macromiid skimmer Possibly a species of Macromia	
Odonata	indeterminate	Indeterminate	Indeterminate	1990	Misc-Juliaetta	Unidentified dragonflies	
Orthoptera	Tettigoniidae	Undescribed	Undescribed	"Smiley et al. 1975"	Clarkia	Partial katydid specimens	
Plecoptera	Leuctridae	Megaleuctra	†Megaleuctra jewetti	Lewis, 1969	Misc-Juliaetta	A rolled-wing stonefly	
Trichoptera	Limnephilidae	Limnephilus	Indeterminate	1990	Misc-Juliaetta	An unidentified northern caddisfly	
Trichoptera	Limnephilidae	†Miopsyche	†Miopsyche alexanderi	Carpenter, 1931	Spokane	A northern caddisfly	
Trichoptera	Limnephilidae	†Miopsyche	†Miopsyche martynovi	Carpenter, 1931	Spokane	A northern caddisfly	
Trichoptera	Limnephilidae	†Miopsyche	Indeterminate	1990	Clarkia; Misc-Juliaetta	An unidentified northern caddisfly	
Trichoptera	Phryganeidae	†Folindusia	†Folindusia miocenica	Berry, 1928	Spokane	A phryganeid giant caddisfly larval case indusispecies	Folindusia miocenica
Trichoptera	Phryganeidae	†Folindusia	†Folindusia sp.	1970	Misc-Juliaetta; Spokane	A phryganeid giant caddisfly larval case indusispecies	
Trichoptera	Phryganeidae	Phryganea	†Phryganea spokanensis	Carpenter, 1931	Spokane	A giant caddisfly	
Trichoptera	Phryganeidae	Phryganea	Indeterminate	1990	Misc-Juliaetta	An unidentified giant caddisfly	

== Fish ==
Family	Genus	Species	Author/year	Florule	Notes	Images
Centrarchidae	Archoplites	†Archoplites clarki	Smith & Miller, 1985	Clarkia	A sun fish	
Leuciscidae	Gila	Unnamed		Clarkia	Possibly 2 species of western chub	
Salmonidae	Cf. Hucho	Unnamed		Clarkia	An unnamed salmonid First described as a taimen, later noted to be similar to but not in Hucho	
Unidentified	Unidentified	Unidentified		Spokane?; Misc-Weiser; Misc-Juliaetta; Misc-N of Lewiston	Isolated scales and vertebrae Suggested to be Leuciscus possibly the same as Leuciscus turneri	"fish scales"

== Mammals ==
Family	Genus	Species	Author/year	Florule	Notes	Images
Sciuridae	incertae sedis	incertae sedis	"2018"	Clarkia	The first tetrapod from Clarkia	Clarkia Sciuridae specimen Burke Museum #UWBM 113209

== Algae ==
An initial survey of Latah Formation diatoms was conduced by Albert Mann at the behest of Frank Hall Knowlton. Based on sample material recovered from a well 0.25 mi (0.40 km) west of Mica, Washington, itself southeast of Spokane, Mann identified a large number of diatomaceous species, including 10 new species. Mann noted the diatoms appear to have lived under stressed conditions caused by caustic water, with many of the specimens showing malformed shapes or blurred ornamentations. The typical cause of this in diatoms is a high concentration of dissolved mineral salts in the water body.

Family	Genus	Species	Author/year	Florule	Notes	Synonyms	Images
Amphipleuraceae	Amphipleura	Amphipleura oregonica	Grunow	Spokane	An amphipleuraceous diatom	Amphipleura pellucida var. oregonica	
Amphipleuraceae	Frustulia	Frustulia rhomboides	(Ehrenberg) De Toni	Spokane	An amphipleuraceous diatom		Frustulia rhomboides
Aulacoseiraceae	Aulacoseira	†Aulacoseira distans	(Ehrenberg) Simonsen	Spokane	A aulacoseiraceous diatom	Melosira distans	
Aulacoseiraceae	Aulacoseira	Aulacoseira granulata	(Ehrenberg) Simonsen	Spokane	A aulacoseiraceous diatom	Melosira granulata	
Cavinulaceae	Cavinula	Cavinula scutiformis	(Grunow ex A.Schmidt) D.G.Mann & A.J.Stickle	Spokane	A cavinulaceous diatom	Navicula scutiformis	
Coscinodiscaceae	Coscinodiscus	Coscinodiscus subaulacodiscoidalis	Rattray	Spokane	A coscinodiscaceous diatom		Coscinodiscus subaulacodiscoidalis
Cymbellaceae	Cymbella	Cymbella americana	A.W.F.Schmidt	Spokane	A cymbellaceous diatom		Cymbella americana
Cymbellaceae	Cymbella	Cymbella amphicephala	Näegeli	Spokane	A cymbellaceous diatom		
Cymbellaceae	Cymbella	Cymbella flexella	Kützing	Spokane	A cymbellaceous diatom	Achnanthes (Achnanthidium) flexella	
Cymbellaceae	Cymbella	Cymbella lunula	(Ehrenberg) Rabenhorst	Spokane	A cymbellaceous diatom		
Cymbellaceae	Cymbella	Cymbella partita	Mann	Spokane	A cymbellaceous diatom		Cymbella partita
Cymbellaceae	Cymbella	Cymbella sagittarius	Mann	Spokane	A cymbellaceous diatom		Cymbella sagittarius
Eunotiaceae	Actinella	Actinella brasiliensis	Grunow	Spokane	A eunotiaceous diatom		
Eunotiaceae	Desmogonium	Desmogonium rabenhorstianum	Grunow	Spokane	A eunotiaceous diatom		
Eunotiaceae	Eunotia	Eunotia incisa	Grunow	Spokane	A eunotiaceous diatom		
Eunotiaceae	Eunotia	Eunotia parallela	Ehrenberg	Spokane	A eunotiaceous diatom		
Eunotiaceae	Eunotia	Eunotia pectinalis	(Kuetzing) Rabenhorst	Spokane	A eunotiaceous diatom		
Eunotiaceae	Eunotia	Eunotia robusta	Ralfs	Spokane	A eunotiaceous diatom Varieties E. r. var. diadema & E. r. var. papilio		
Fragilariaceae	Fragilaria	Fragilaria constricta	(A.Cleve) Hustedt	Spokane	A fragilariaceous diatom Form Fragilaria constricta f. stricta	Fragilaria undata	
Fragilariaceae	Fragilaria	Fragilaria binalis	Ehrenberg	Spokane	A fragilariaceous diatom	Tabellaria binalis	
Gomphonemataceae	Gomphonema	Gomphonema acuminatum	Ehrenberg	Spokane	A gomphonemataceous diatom		
Gomphonemataceae	Gomphonema	Gomphonema gracile	Ehrenberg	Spokane	A gomphonemataceous diatom		
Gomphonemataceae	Gomphonema	Gomphonema parvulum	(Kützing) Kützing	Spokane	A gomphonemataceous diatom		
Melosiraceae	Melosira	Melosira biseriata	(Ehrenberg) Schmidt	Spokane	A melosiraceous diatom		
Melosiraceae	Melosira	Melosira lyrata	Ehrenberg	Spokane	A melosiraceous diatom		
Melosiraceae	Melosira	Melosira teres	Brun	Spokane	A melosiraceous diatom		
Melosiraceae	Melosira	Melosira undulata	(Ehrenberg) Kützing	Spokane	A melosiraceous diatom		
Naviculaceae	Caloneis	Caloneis westii	(W.Smith) Hendey	Spokane	A naviculaceous diatom	Navicula formosa	
Naviculaceae	Navicula	Navicula americana	F.W. Mills	Spokane	A naviculaceous diatom		
Naviculaceae	Navicula	Navicula angusta	Grunow	Spokane	A naviculaceous diatom		
Naviculaceae	Navicula	Navicula bacillum	Ehrenberg	Spokane	A naviculaceous diatom		
Naviculaceae	Navicula	Navicula commutata	Grunow ex A.Schmidt	Spokane	A naviculaceous diatom		
Naviculaceae	Navicula	†Navicula contendens	Mann	Spokane	A naviculaceous diatom		Navicula contendens
Naviculaceae	Navicula	Navicula elegans	Grunow	Spokane	A naviculaceous diatom		
Naviculaceae	Navicula	Navicula instabilis	A.Schmidt	Spokane	A naviculaceous diatom		
Naviculaceae	Navicula	†Navicula pauper	Mann	Spokane	A naviculaceous diatom		Navicula pauper
Naviculaceae	Navicula	Navicula placentula	Pantocsek	Spokane	A naviculaceous diatom		
Naviculaceae	Navicula	†Navicula pontifica	Mann	Spokane	A naviculaceous diatom		Navicula pontifica
Naviculaceae	Navicula	†Navicula protrudens	Mann	Spokane	A naviculaceous diatom		Navicula protrudens
Naviculaceae	Navicula	†Navicula pseudoaffinis	Mann	Spokane	A naviculaceous diatom		Navicula pseudoaffinis
Naviculaceae	Navicula	Navicula pseudobacillum	Grunow	Spokane	A naviculaceous diatom		
Naviculaceae	Navicula	Navicula pusilla	Donkin	Spokane	A naviculaceous diatom		
Naviculaceae	Navicula	Navicula radiosa	Kützing	Spokane	A naviculaceous diatom		
Naviculaceae	Navicula	†Navicula reversa	Mann	Spokane	A naviculaceous diatom		Navicula reversa
Naviculaceae	Navicula	Navicula stauroptera	Schumann	Spokane	A naviculaceous diatom		
Naviculaceae	Navicula	Navicula subacuta	(Ehrenberg) Ralfs	Spokane	A naviculaceous diatom		
Naviculaceae	Navicula	†Navicula substauroneis	Mann	Spokane	A naviculaceous diatom		Navicula substauroneis
Naviculaceae	Navicula	Navicula tabellaria	(Ehrenberg) Kützing	Spokane	A naviculaceous diatom		
Naviculaceae	Navicula	Navicula transversa	A.Schmidt	Spokane	A naviculaceous diatom		
Naviculaceae	Navicula	Navicula viridis	(Nitzsch) Kutzing	Spokane	A naviculaceous diatom		
Neidiaceae	Neidium	Neidium dubium	(Ehrenberg) Cleve	Spokane	A neidiaceous diatom		
Neidiaceae	Neidium	Neidium iridescens	(Mann) VanLandingham	Spokane	A naviculaceous diatom	Navicula iridescens	Neidium iridescens
Neidiaceae	Neidium	Neidium iridis	(Ehrenberg) Cleve	Spokane	A neidiaceous diatom	Navicula iridis	
Pinnulariaceae	Pinnularia	Pinnularia gibba	Ehrenberg	Spokane	A pinnulariaceous diatom	Navicula gibba	
Pinnulariaceae	Pinnularia	Pinnularia gracillima	W.Gregory	Spokane	A pinnulariaceous diatom	Navicula gracillima	Pinnularia gracillima
Pinnulariaceae	Pinnularia	Pinnularia major	(Kützing) Rabenhorst	Spokane	A pinnulariaceous diatom	Navicula major	
Pinnulariaceae	Pinnularia	Pinnularia mesotyla	Ehrenberg	Spokane	A pinnulariaceous diatom	Navicula mesotyla	
Pinnulariaceae	Pinnularia	Pinnularia nodosa	(Ehrenberg) W.Smith	Spokane	A pinnulariaceous diatom	Navicula nodosa	
Pinnulariaceae	Pinnularia	Pinnularia rupestris	Hantzsch	Spokane	A pinnulariaceous diatom	Navicula rupestris	
Pinnulariaceae	Pinnularia	Pinnularia subcapitata	W.Gregory	Spokane	A pinnulariaceous diatom	Navicula hilseana	
Stauroneidaceae	Stauroneis	†Stauroneis acutissima	Mann	Spokane	A stauroneidaceous diatom		Stauroneis acutissima
Stauroneidaceae	Stauroneis	Stauroneis anceps	Ehrenberg	Spokane	A stauroneidaceous diatom		Stauroneis anceps
Stauroneidaceae	Stauroneis	Stauroneis phoenicenteron	(Nitzsch) Ehrenberg	Spokane	A stauroneidaceous diatom		Stauroneis phoenicenteron
Surirellaceae	Surirella	Surirella bifrons	Ehrenberg	Spokane	A surirellaceous diatom		
Surirellaceae	Surirella	Surirella inducta	A.W.F.Schmidt	Spokane	A surirellaceous diatom		
Surirellaceae	Surirella	Surirella striatula	Turpin	Spokane	A surirellaceous diatom		
Tabellariaceae	Tabellaria	Tabellaria fenestrata	(Lyngbye) Kützing	Spokane	A tabellariaceous diatom		
Tabellariaceae	Tabellaria	Tabellaria flocculosa	(Roth) Kützing	Spokane	A tabellariaceous diatom		
Tabellariaceae	Tetracyclus	Tetracyclus ellipticus	(Ehrenberg) Grunow	Spokane	A tabellariaceous diatom		
Tetracyclus lacustris	Tetracyclus	Ralfs	Spokane	A tabellariaceous diatom			
incertae sedis	Diatoma	Diatoma grande	W. Smith	Spokane	A diatom of uncertain familial affiliation		
incertae sedis	Diatoma	Diatoma tenue var. hybrida	Grunow	Spokane	A diatom of uncertain familial affiliation		
incertae sedis	Diatoma	Diatoma vulgaris	Bory de Saint-Vincent	Spokane	A diatom of uncertain familial affiliation	Diatoma vulgare	
incertae sedis	Gomphogramma	Gomphogramma rupestre	(Kützing) Braun in Rabenhorst	Spokane	A bacillariophyceopus diatom of uncertain affiliation	Tetracyclus rupestris	
incertae sedis	Himantidium	Himantidium faba	Ehrenberg	Spokane	A diatom of uncertain familial affiliation	Eunotia faba	
incertae sedis	Himantidium	Himantidium gracile	Ehrenberg	Spokane	A diatom of uncertain familial affiliation	Eunotia gracilis	Himantidium gracile
incertae sedis	Himantidium	Himantidium minus	Kützing	Spokane	A diatom of uncertain familial affiliation	Eunotia minus	
