= E. frontalis =

E. frontalis may refer to:

- Eoscatophagus frontalis, a fossil fish species from the Eocene of Northern Italy
- Epophthalmia frontalis, a dragonfly species in the genus Epophthalmia

== See also ==
- Frontalis (disambiguation)
