= Halamphora coffeiformis =

Scientific classification
- Domain: Eukaryota
- Clade: Sar
- Clade: Stramenopiles
- Division: Ochrophyta
- Clade: Bacillariophyta
- Class: Bacillariophyceae
- Order: Surirellales
- Family: Surirellaceae
- Genus: Halamphora
- Species: H. coffeiformis

Binomial name
- Halamphora coffeiformis (C.Agardh) Mereschkowsky 1903

Species of single-celled organism

Halamphora coffeiformis is a species of diatoms belonging to the family Amphipleuraceae.

Synonyms:

- Amphora coffeiformis (C.Agardh) Kützing 1844
- Amphora coffeaeformis (C.Agardh) Kützing, 1844
