= Eunotia elegans =

Scientific classification
- Domain: Eukaryota
- Clade: Diaphoretickes
- Clade: SAR
- Clade: Stramenopiles
- Phylum: Gyrista
- Subphylum: Ochrophytina
- Class: Bacillariophyceae
- Order: Eunotiales
- Family: Eunotiaceae
- Genus: Eunotia
- Species: E. elegans

Binomial name
- Eunotia elegans Østrup, 1910

Species of single-celled organism

Eunotia elegans is a species of diatom. It is found in Denmark.
