= Euodia =

Euodia may refer to:

- Euodia (diatom), a genus in the family Eunotiaceae
- Euodia (plant), a plant genus in the family Rutaceae
  - Tetradium, related genus known in cultivation in English-speaking countries as Euodia
- Euodia (New Testament), a woman mentioned in the New Testament book of Philippians

== See also ==
- Evodius, an Early Christian bishop of Antioch
