= Sphaerodes =

Sphaerodes may refer to:

- Sphoerodes, a ground beetle genus in the tribe Oodini
- Sphaerodes (fungus), a fungus genus in the family Ceratostomataceae
