= List of Ascomycota families incertae sedis =

The following fungal families have not been taxonomically classified in any of the classes or orders accepted in the current classification of the Ascomycota with a high degree of probability (incertae sedis):

- Alinaceae Boonmee & K.D. Hyde
- Amorphothecaceae
- Aphanopsidaceae
- Aspidotheliaceae
- Batistiaceae
- Coniocybaceae
- Diporothecaceae
- Eoterfeziaceae
- Epigloeaceae
- Hispidicarpomycetaceae
- Koralionastetaceae
- Lautosporaceae
- Mucomassariaceae
- Phyllobatheliaceae
- Pleurotremataceae
- Pseudeurotiaceae
- Saccardiaceae
- Seuratiaceae
- Strangosporaceae
- Thelocarpaceae
- Xanthopyreniaceae
