= Brachydesmiella obclavata =

Scientific classification
- Kingdom: Fungi
- Division: Ascomycota
- Class: incertae sedis
- Order: incertae sedis
- Family: incertae sedis
- Genus: Brachydesmiella
- Species: B. obclavata

Binomial name
- Brachydesmiella obclavata Ruiz et al., 2006

Species of fungus

Brachydesmiella obclavata is a fungus first found in decaying pods of unidentified Leguminosae in Bahia State, Brazil. The species is distinguished by obclavate, rostrate, 1-euseptate, pale brown, smooth-walled conidia.
