= Hispidicarpomycetaceae =

Scientific classification
- Kingdom: Fungi
- Division: Ascomycota
- Class: incertae sedis
- Order: incertae sedis
- Family: Hispidicarpomycetaceae; Nakagiri

Type genus
- Hispidicarpomyces Nakagiri

Family of fungi

The Hispidicarpomycetaceae are a family of fungi in the Ascomycota division. This family can not yet be taxonomically classified in any of the ascomycetous classes and orders with any degree of certainty (incertae sedis). It contains the single genus Hispidicarpomyces.

== See also ==
- List of Ascomycota families incertae sedis
