= Eoterfeziaceae =

Scientific classification
- Kingdom: Fungi
- Division: Ascomycota
- Class: incertae sedis
- Order: incertae sedis
- Family: Eoterfeziaceae; G.F. Atk.

Type genus
- Eoterfezia G.F. Atk.

Genera
- Acanthogymnomyces; Eoterfezia

Family of fungi

The Eoterfeziaceae are a family of fungi in the Ascomycota division. This family can not yet be taxonomically classified in any of the ascomycetous classes and orders with any degree of certainty (incertae sedis).

== See also ==
- List of Ascomycota families incertae sedis
