= Pterandra isthmica =

Conservation status
- Endangered (IUCN 2.3)

Scientific classification
- Kingdom: Plantae
- Clade: Tracheophytes
- Clade: Angiosperms
- Clade: Eudicots
- Clade: Rosids
- Order: Malpighiales
- Family: Malpighiaceae
- Genus: Pterandra
- Species: P. isthmica

Binomial name
- Pterandra isthmica Cuatr. & Croat

Species of flowering plant

Pterandra isthmica is a species of plant in the Malpighiaceae family. It is endemic to Panama. It is threatened by habitat loss.
