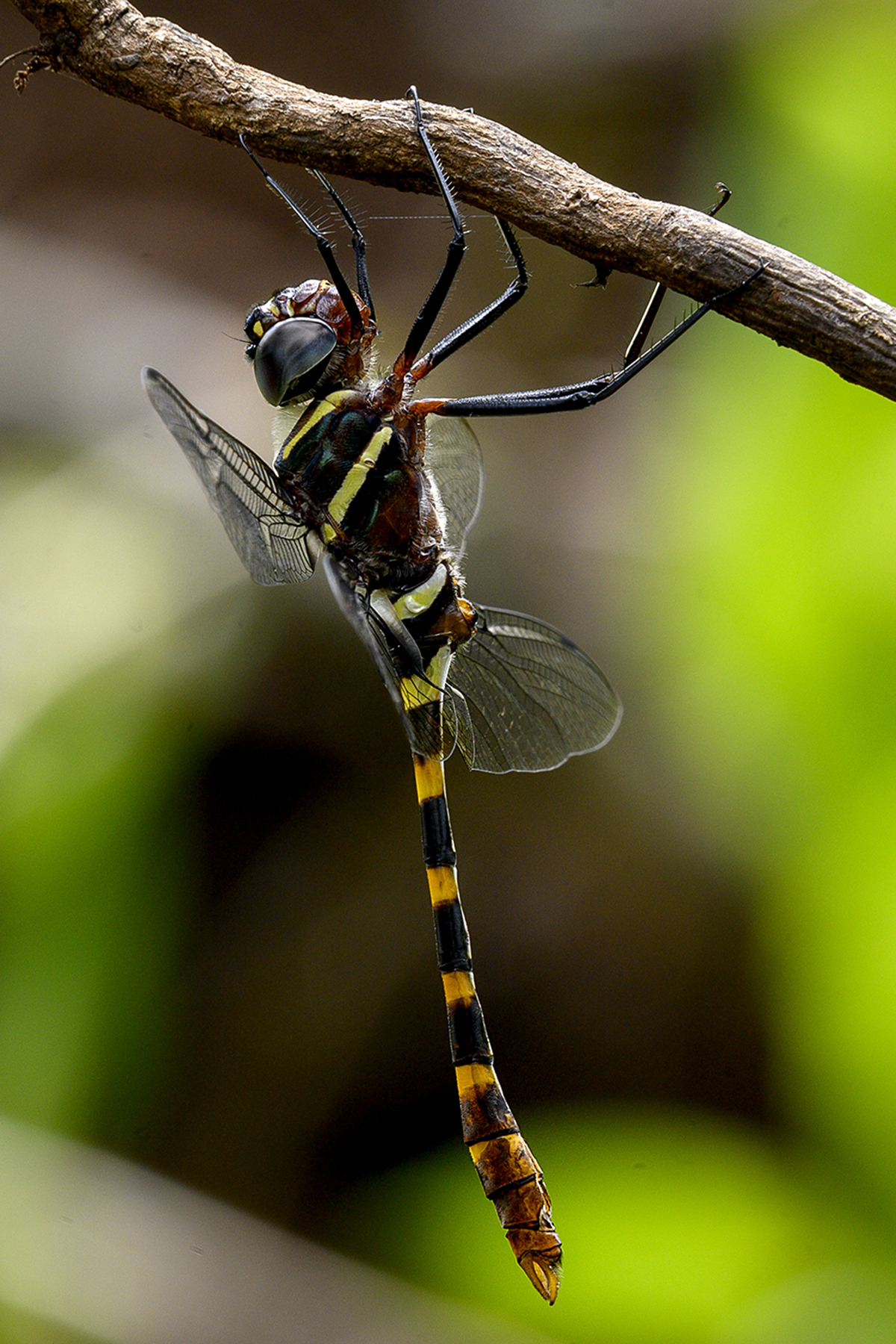
- Male

Conservation status
- Least Concern (IUCN 3.1)

Scientific classification
- Kingdom: Animalia
- Phylum: Arthropoda
- Class: Insecta
- Order: Odonata
- Infraorder: Anisoptera
- Family: Macromiidae
- Genus: Epophthalmia
- Species: E. frontalis

Binomial name
- Epophthalmia frontalis Selys, 1871

Synonyms
- Macromia binocellata Fraser, 1924; Epopththalmia frontalis malabarensis Fraser, 1935

= Epophthalmia frontalis =

Species of dragonfly

Epophthalmia frontalis is a species of dragonfly in the family Macromiidae. It is found in India, Nepal, Thailand, and other southeast Asian countries.

== Description ==
It is a large dragonfly with bluish-green eyes. Its thorax is dark reddish-brown with a dark green metallic reflex, marked with yellow. There is a narrow antehumeral stripe, and an oblique narrow stripe on each side; the two stripes meeting over the dorsum between the wings. Abdomen is black, changing to dark reddish-brown at the terminal segments, ringed with bright ochreous yellow. The base of segment 1 is yellow. Segment 2 has a narrow ring as in Epophthalmia vittata. Segment 3 has a complete broad ring occupying the apical two-thirds of the segment. Segments 4 to 7 have a broad basal ring. Segment 8 has a broad basal triangle of yellow. Segment 10 has a basal vestige of yellow. Segment 10 is entirely yellow. Anal appendages are reddish-brown.

== See also ==
- List of odonates of India
- List of odonata of Kerala
