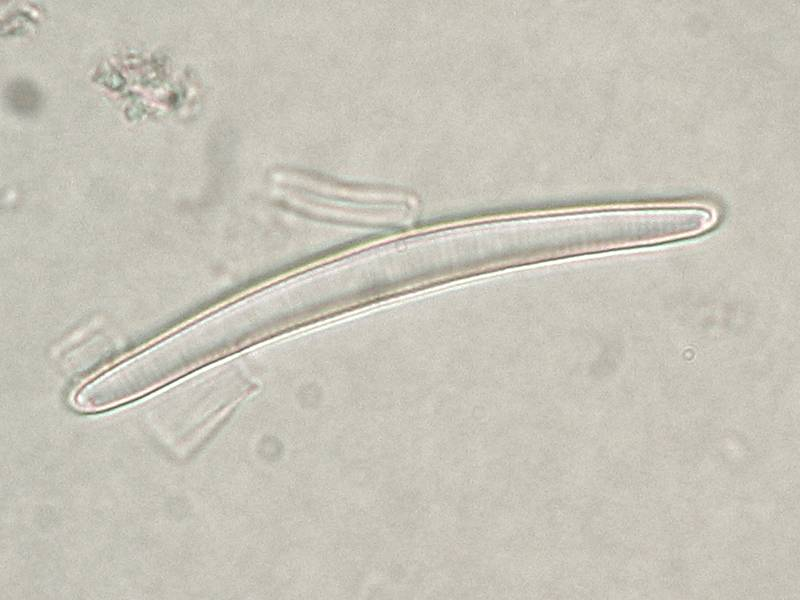
- Eunotia sp.

Scientific classification
- Domain: Eukaryota
- Clade: Sar
- Clade: Stramenopiles
- Phylum: Ochrophyta
- Clade: Diatomeae
- Subphylum: Bacillariophytina
- Class: Bacillariophyceae
- Subclass: Bacillariophycidae
- Superorder: Eunotiophycanae
- Order: Eunotiales; P. C. Silva, 1962

Families
- Eunotiaceae; Peroniaceae

= Eunotiales =

Proposed order of diatoms

Eunotiales is a proposed order of diatoms, which belongs to superoder Eunotiophycanae.
