= Mucomassariaceae =

Scientific classification
- Kingdom: Fungi
- Division: Ascomycota
- Class: incertae sedis
- Order: incertae sedis
- Family: Mucomassariaceae; Petr.

Type genus
- Mucomassaria Petr. & Cif.

Family of fungi

The Mucomassariaceae are a family of fungi in the Ascomycota division. This family can not yet be taxonomically classified in any of the ascomycetous classes and orders with any degree of certainty (incertae sedis). It contains the single genus Mucomassaria

== See also ==
- List of Ascomycota families incertae sedis
