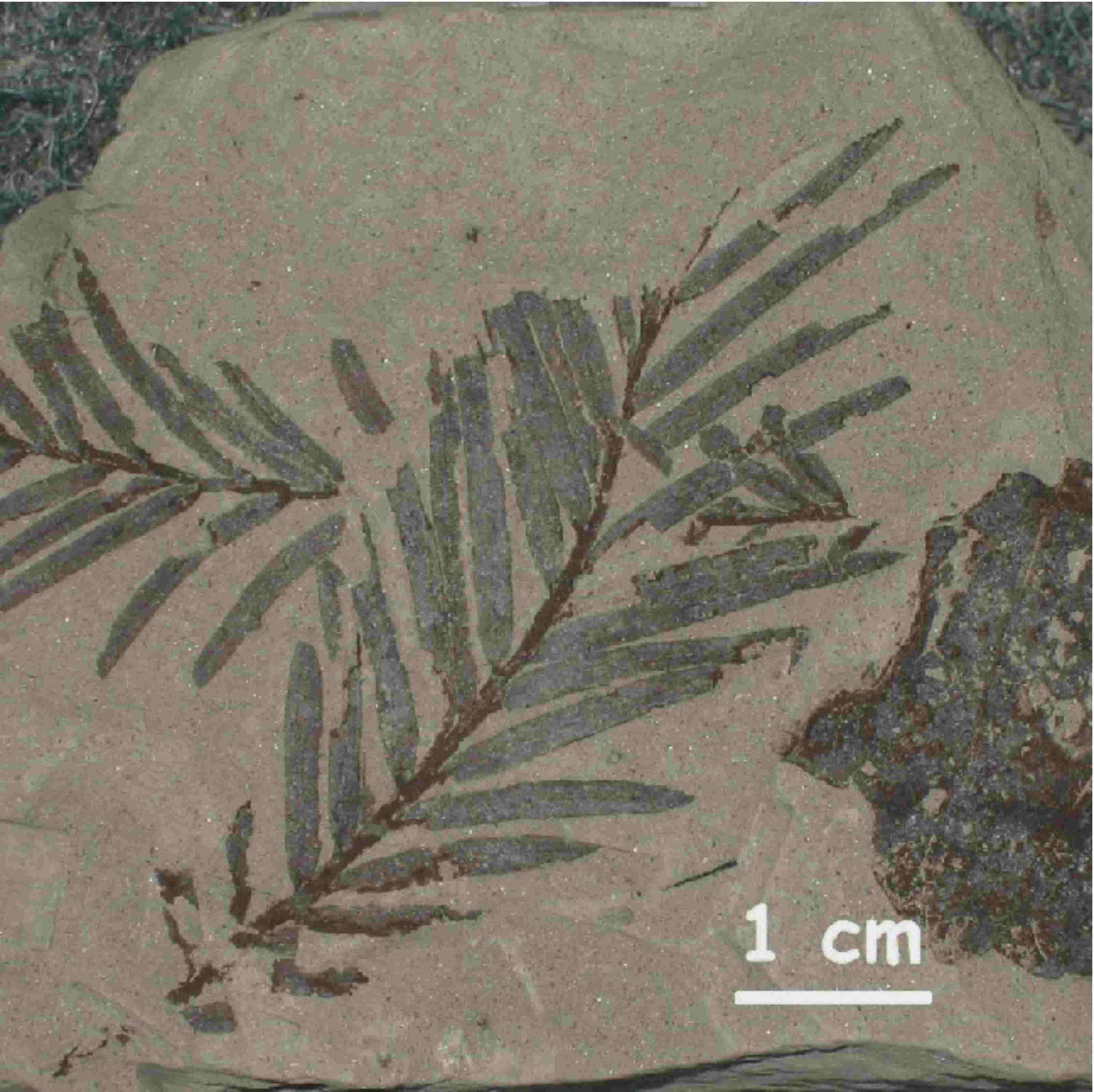
- Fossil branchlets from Germany

Scientific classification
- Kingdom: Plantae
- Clade: Embryophytes
- Clade: Tracheophytes
- Clade: Gymnosperms
- Division: Pinophyta
- Class: Pinopsida
- Order: Cupressales
- Family: Cupressaceae
- Genus: Taxodium
- Species: †T. dubium

Binomial name
- †Taxodium dubium (Sternb.) Heer

Synonyms
- Phyllites dubius Sternberg (type); T. crassum Hollick; T. distichum miocenicum Heer; T. dubium longifolium Massalongo

= Taxodium dubium =

Taxodium dubium Temporal range: Paleocene–Pliocene

Extinct species of conifer

Taxodium dubium is an extinct species of baldcypress in the genus Taxodium in the family Cupressaceae which lived from the Late Paleocene to the Pliocene in North America, Europe and Asia. The species was first described in 1823 by Kaspar Maria von Sternberg.

== Distribution ==
The oldest North American occurrences date to the Paleocene of St. Lawrence Island off the west coast of Alaska and to the Denali National Park and Preserve in central Alaska. By the early Eocene the species had spread south along British Columbia to North and Central Washington state. Ypresian age Okanagan highlands fossils have been found in the British Columbia interior at Quilchena and in Princetons Allenby Formation along with in the Klondike Mountain Formation around Republic and Northern Ferry County, Washington. Coeval lowland coastal swamp and flood plain fossils are found in the Fraser River valley of British Columbia, the Chuckanut Formation of northern Washington, and the Puget Group in the Puget Sound lowlands. The species continued to expand south and by the Middle Eocene was present from the John Day Formation of Oregon south to the Weaverville, California, and in the Miocene had spread east to the Elko Formation, Nevada and the Clarkia fossil beds in Idaho. T. dubium was one of the notable components of the Grand Coulee and Latah floras which interbed with the Columbia River basalts during the middle to late Miocene. By the end of the Miocene and the beginning of the Pliocene, the species was restricted to California, with fossils known from the Corral Hollow and Pittsburg.

The oldest European occurrences are on the island of Spitsbergen, where the species was first described from in 1823. By the late Eocene the species had spread across Europe, with fossils found in Germany, Russia, and the Czech Republic. The latest occurrences in the Atlantic Boreal regions of Europe date to the Late Miocene, while it survived into the late Pliocene in the Paratethys region.

== Description ==
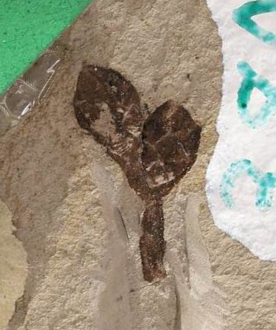
Staminate cones Miocene Latah Formation North America

Taxodium dubuim leaves are noted to be dimorphic, with scaly needles present on immature short shoots, and acicular needles on mature short and long shoots. The immature scaly needles are spirally attached around the branchlet, while mature longer needles curve off the branchlets into a flat plane on each side of the shoot. The acicular needles have a pointed apex and a sharply rounded base where a short petiole curves to meet the branchlet. At the longest, needles are up to 1.2 cm (0.47 in).

The short shoots are up to 8 cm (3.1 in) long, and have up to sixty needles that are longest near the center point of the branchlet, getting progressively sorter toward the shoot apex and base. Short shoots sprout in alternating pattern from the older long shoots, which have more widely spaced needles which are also spirally attached but rotated into a flat spray to either side of the shoot.

Mature seed cones of T. dubium range up to 2.5 cm (1 in) in diameter, though the cone scales are deciduous, and are shed after cone maturity, which results in full seed cone fossils being rarely preserved. The cone scales are spirally attached to the center axis with up to twelve scales completing a full cone. The scales are shield shaped in outline, with a roughly square to slightly rectangular length to width ratio. The cones were born directly on the branches, with no attaching stem. The central area of each scale is slightly concave, to hold the maturing wing seeds prior to dispersal.

The pollen cones are produced singly or spirally on a panicled branchlet, which is often shed from the tree after pollen dispersal. Individual pollen cones are up to approximately 1 mm (0.04 in) in diameter, with a globular to ovoid outline. The cone scales are indistinct in the fossils, but are suggested to be spirally attached to the center stem.
