= Hiraea perplexa =

Conservation status
- Vulnerable (IUCN 3.1)

Scientific classification
- Kingdom: Plantae
- Clade: Tracheophytes
- Clade: Angiosperms
- Clade: Eudicots
- Clade: Rosids
- Order: Malpighiales
- Family: Malpighiaceae
- Genus: Hiraea
- Species: H. perplexa

Binomial name
- Hiraea perplexa W.R.Anderson

Species of flowering plant

Hiraea perplexa is a species of plant in the Malpighiaceae family and is endemic to Ecuador. Its natural habitat is subtropical or tropical moist lowland forests.
