= Brachydesmiella brasiliensis =

Scientific classification
- Domain: Eukaryota
- Kingdom: Fungi
- Division: Ascomycota
- Class: incertae sedis
- Order: incertae sedis
- Family: incertae sedis
- Genus: Brachydesmiella
- Species: B. brasiliensis

Binomial name
- Brachydesmiella brasiliensis R.F.Castañeda, Gusmão & Heredia (2006)

Species of fungus

Brachydesmiella brasiliensis is a fungus first found in decaying pods of unidentified Leguminosae in Bahia State, Brazil. The species is distinguished by navicular to fusiform, 3-euseptate, densely verrucose, brown conidia.
