= Lautosporaceae =

Scientific classification
- Kingdom: Fungi
- Division: Ascomycota
- Class: incertae sedis
- Order: incertae sedis
- Family: Lautosporaceae; Kohlm., Volkm.-Kohlm. & O.E. Erikss.

Type genus
- Lautospora K.D. Hyde & E.B.G. Jones

Family of fungi

The Lautosporaceae are a family of fungi in the Ascomycota phylum. This family can not yet be taxonomically classified in any of the ascomycetous classes and orders with any degree of certainty (incertae sedis). It contains the single genus Lautospora.

== See also ==
- List of Ascomycota families incertae sedis
