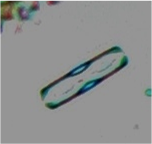
- Amphiprora sp.

Scientific classification
- Domain: Eukaryota
- Supergroup: Stramenopiles
- Division: Ochrophyta
- Clade: Bacillariophyta
- Class: Bacillariophyceae
- Order: Mastogloiales
- Family: Amphipleuraceae
- Genus: Amphiprora; Ehrenberg, 1843

Extant species
- Amphiprora alata; Amphiprora ornata; Amphiprora paludosa

= Amphiprora =

Genus of diatoms

Amphiprora is a genus of diatoms belonging to the family Amphipleuraceae.

The genus was first described by C. G. Ehrenberg in 1843.

The genus has cosmopolitan distribution.

Species:

- Amphiprora alata
- Amphiprora ornata
- Amphiprora paludosa
