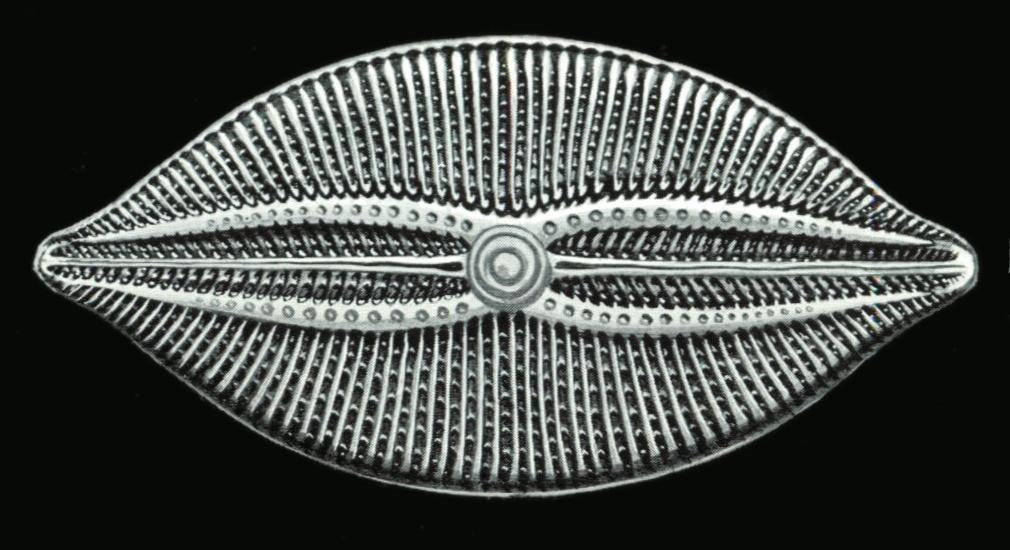

Scientific classification
- Domain: Eukaryota
- Supergroup: Stramenopiles
- Division: Ochrophyta
- Clade: Bacillariophyta
- Class: Bacillariophyceae
- Order: Mastogloiales
- Family: Amphipleuraceae
- Genus: Amphipleura; Kützing, 1844

Extant species
- Amphipleura pellucida; Amphipleura rutilans; Amphipleura vavilovii

= Amphipleura =

Genus of diatoms

Amphipleura is a genus of diatoms belonging to the family Amphipleuraceae.

The genus was first described by Friedrich Traugott Kützing in 1844.

The genus has cosmopolitan distribution.

A newly discovered species, Amphipleura vavilovii, was found to be present in rivers of Laos.

Species:

- Amphipleura pellucida
- Amphipleura rutilans
- Amphipleura vavilovii
