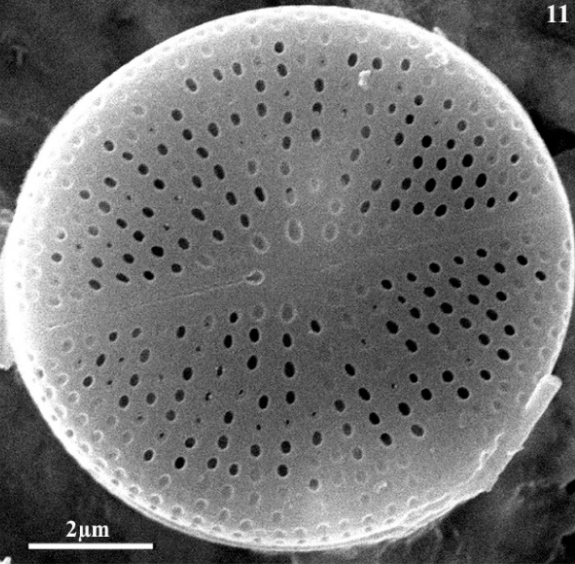
- Cavinula pseudoscutiformis

Scientific classification
- Domain: Eukaryota
- Clade: Diaphoretickes
- Clade: SAR
- Clade: Stramenopiles
- Phylum: Gyrista
- Subphylum: Ochrophytina
- Class: Bacillariophyceae
- Order: Naviculales
- Family: Cavinulaceae

= Cavinulaceae =

Family of diatoms

Cavinulaceae is a family of diatoms belonging to the order Naviculales.

Genera:

- Cavinula D.G.Mann & A.J.Stickle
