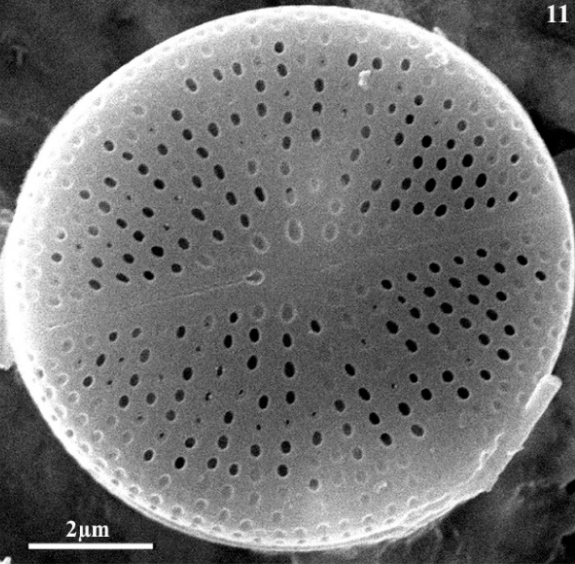
- Cavinula pseudoscutiformis

Scientific classification
- Domain: Eukaryota
- Clade: Diaphoretickes
- Clade: SAR
- Clade: Stramenopiles
- Phylum: Gyrista
- Subphylum: Ochrophytina
- Class: Bacillariophyceae
- Order: Naviculales
- Family: Cavinulaceae
- Genus: Cavinula; D.G.Mann & A.J.Stickle, 1990

= Cavinula =

Genus of diatoms

Cavinula is a genus of diatoms belonging to the family Cavinulaceae.

Species:

- Cavinula altana Metzeltin, Kulikovskiy & Lange-Bertalot
- Cavinula breenii (R.E.M.Archibald) De Ridder & J.C.Taylor
- Cavinula buben M.Kulikovskiy et al.
