= Frustulia =

Scientific classification
- Domain: Eukaryota
- Clade: Sar
- Clade: Stramenopiles
- Division: Ochrophyta
- Clade: Bacillariophyta
- Class: Bacillariophyceae
- Order: Mastogloiales
- Family: Amphipleuraceae
- Genus: Frustulia; L. Rabenhorst, 1853

Species
- See text

Genus of diatoms

Frustulia is a genus of biraphid bilaterally symmetrical and elongated diatoms, representatives of which are found in freshwater all across the world. They can be found as free-living unicellular organisms or in mucilaginous tubes. Since they are photosynthetic, they are primary producers in the environments where they are present. Dead cells act as silica deposits. They have a distinctive porte-crayon, a structure resembling the tip of a pencil formed by the two longitudinal ribs around the raphe joining together, and some clades have a canaliculi, non-perforated areas that appear hyaline. Due to their wide geographic spread, there is some interest in using the species of this genus as models for DNA studies of diatoms.

== Etymology ==
The original description does not provide any rationale for the genus name. Presumably, Frustulia is named after the frustule wall specific to diatoms.

== Type species ==
The original type species described for this genus is Frustulia saxonica Rabenhorst. It was first described by Ludwig Rabenhorst in 1853.

== History of knowledge ==
Previously, most of the species of this genus that were already discovered were classified as part of genus Navicula, and it is likely that some species are still part of this and other similar genera. Most of the differentiation from other genera was done based on electron microscopy since some of the features are difficult to determine in light microscopy.

The first description of this genus comes from the book Die Süsswasser-Diatomaceen (Bacillarien) - Für Freunde der Mikroskopie by German scientist Ludwig Rabenhorst. In his 1853 book, he described six species of this genus. Since then, researchers have found new and previously misclassified Frustulia species in a myriad of samples from all across the globe, some as recently as 2024. A lot of the research on this genome was conducted by Pavla Urbánková and Jana Kulichová at the Charles University in Prague.

== Habitat and ecology ==
Frustulia are freshwater diatoms that are found in lakes and peat bogs with slightly acidic water, as well as in some terrestrial environments near freshwater. The species originally described by Rabenhorst were found in peat bogs. He found them covering the stems and roots of plants as yellow gelatinous masses. He also found them as dirty brownish gelatinous masses in hollows and holes in moist rocks and on mosses beside streams.

Cells of this species occur as single benthic organisms or form mucilaginous tubes. They are commonly found in streams, ditches, and other wet environments, especially in the spring. They are widespread in North America, Europe, and New Zealand. Researchers have also found representatives of Frustulia in the Antarctic and Arctic regions, Argentina, Hawaii, Cuba, India, and China.

== Description ==
Most species in genus Frustulia are bilaterally symmetrical, elongated, and biraphid. The valve margins range from straight to undulate and have longitudinal ribs that run the entire length of the valve. The raphe is contained within the longitudinal ribs. At the distal ends, the raphes join to form a structure that looks like the tip of a pencil. This is known as a porte-crayon and is unique to Frustulia.

The shape of the valves is mostly rhomboid, but can range from rhomboid to linear-lancelot in different species. The valve margins also range from straight edges to undulate ones. The length of the valve, across different species, can range from 26 - 195 μm while the width ranges from 6 - 31 μm.

The cell walls of Frustulia, like other diatoms, are silica- and pectin-rich. The puncta in the cell wall are arranged to produce apical and transapical rows on the surface of the cell. The cells have many morphological characteristics such as raphe angle, raphe rib width, and stria organization at the apex, which can be used to differentiate between different species and to differentiate members of this genus from others. However, many morphologically similar cryptic species exist.

The cells have one H-shaped plastid. Some species also had non-perforated areas that appeared hyaline and were termed canaliculi. This feature is preserved in some clades in this genus and not in others, and can therefore be used in taxonomy.

== Fossil history ==
Despite the prevalence of the genus in freshwater lakes and bogs around the world, not much research has been done into trying to identify it in fossils. However, there is evidence that this genus will be found in fossils since some Frustulia floridana and Frustulia sanctaerosae have been found in some fossil freshwater deposits from Florida.

== Practical importance ==
Frustulia has been used as a model genus due to its broad geographic range to test candidate markers for DNA barcoding of diatoms of genes potentially involved in species diversity. Despite the fact that this study was inconclusive, alternate methods could be used to replicate this experiment, especially since this genus is an ideal candidate for studies in speciation due to its ecological spread.

== Species ==
- Frustulia saxonica
- Frustulia calamensis
- Frustulia galapagosaxonica
- Frustulia interposita
- Frustulia loaensis
- Frustulia amphipleuroides
- Frustulia bohemica
- Frustulia lewisiana
- Frustulia splendida
- Frustulia attenuata
- Frustulia copulata
- Frustulia gastroides
- Frustulia lebouvieri
- Frustulia linearis
- Frustulia major
- Frustulia rhomboides
- Frustulia scalaris
- Frustulia sigmoidea
- Frustulia similis
- Frustulia creuzburgensis
- Frustulia capitata
- Frustulia neomundada
- Frustulia pseudomagalismontanum
- Frustulia crassinervata
- Frustulia latta
- Frustulia asiatica
- Frustulia soror
- Frustulia vulgaris
- Frustulia amosseana
- Frustulia quadrisinuata
- Frustulia inculata
- Frustulia rexi
- Frustulia esandalliae
- Frustulia krammeri
- Frustulia bahlsii
- Frustulia erifuga
- Frustulia spicula
- Frustulia viridula
- Frustulia weinholdii
- Frustulia indica
- Frustulia hawaiensis
- Frustulia gibsonea
- Frustulia floridiana
- Frustulia sanctaerosae
