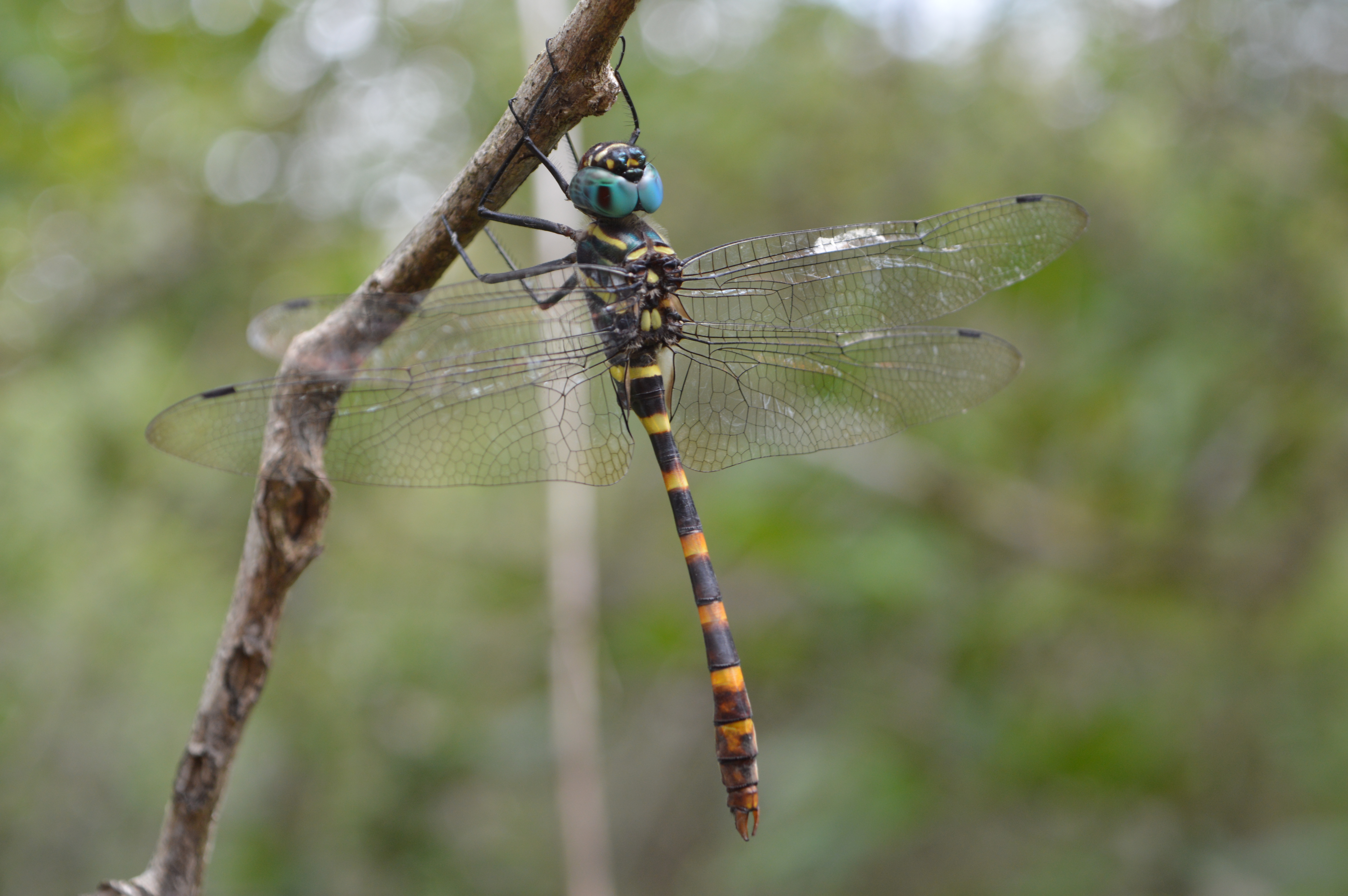
- Male
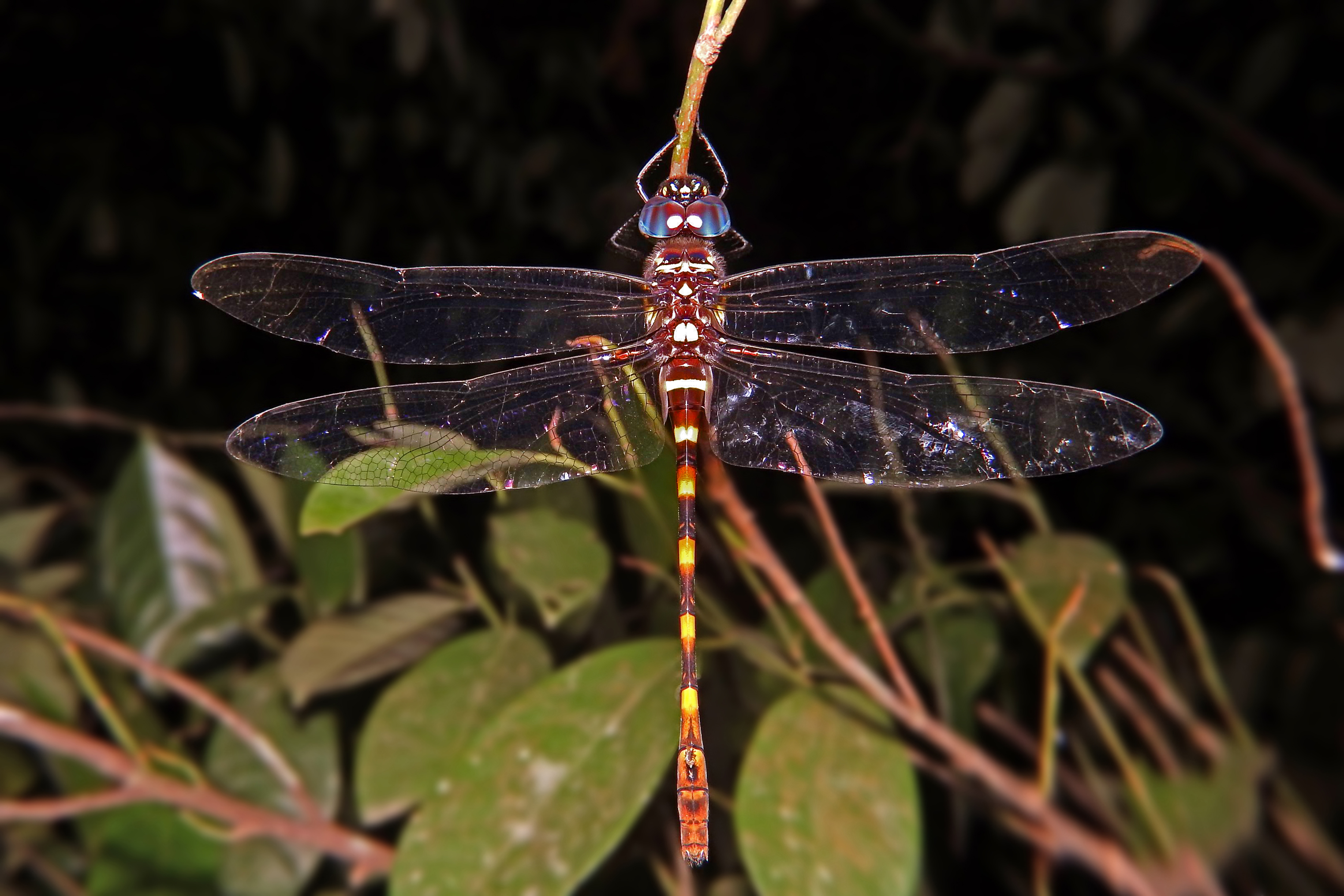
- Female

Conservation status
- Least Concern (IUCN 3.1)

Scientific classification
- Kingdom: Animalia
- Phylum: Arthropoda
- Class: Insecta
- Order: Odonata
- Infraorder: Anisoptera
- Family: Macromiidae
- Genus: Epophthalmia
- Species: E. vittata

Binomial name
- Epophthalmia vittata Burmeister, 1839

= Epophthalmia vittata =

Species of dragonfly

Epophthalmia vittata, the common torrent hawk, is a species of dragonfly in the family Macromiidae. It is found in India, Sri Lanka, and Indonesia. Three subspecies recognized.

== Subspecies ==
- Epophthalmia vittata cyanocephala – from Sri Lanka
- Epophthalmia vittata vittata – from India
- Epophthalmia vittata sundana – from Indonesia

== Description and habitat ==
It is a moderately sized dragonfly with bluish-green eyes and dark brown thorax, marked with yellow stripes on the sides. Its abdomen is dark reddish-brown with yellow annules on segment 1 to 9. The species breeds in weedy tanks and ponds. Adults can be found far away from breeding habitats. It soars tirelessly during daytime high up, occasionally in small swarms.

== See also ==
- List of odonates of Sri Lanka
- List of odonates of India
- List of odonata of Kerala
