= Clarkia fossil beds =

Miocene Latah Formation lagerstätte near Clarkia, Idaho

Coordinates: 46.9923°N 116.2764°W

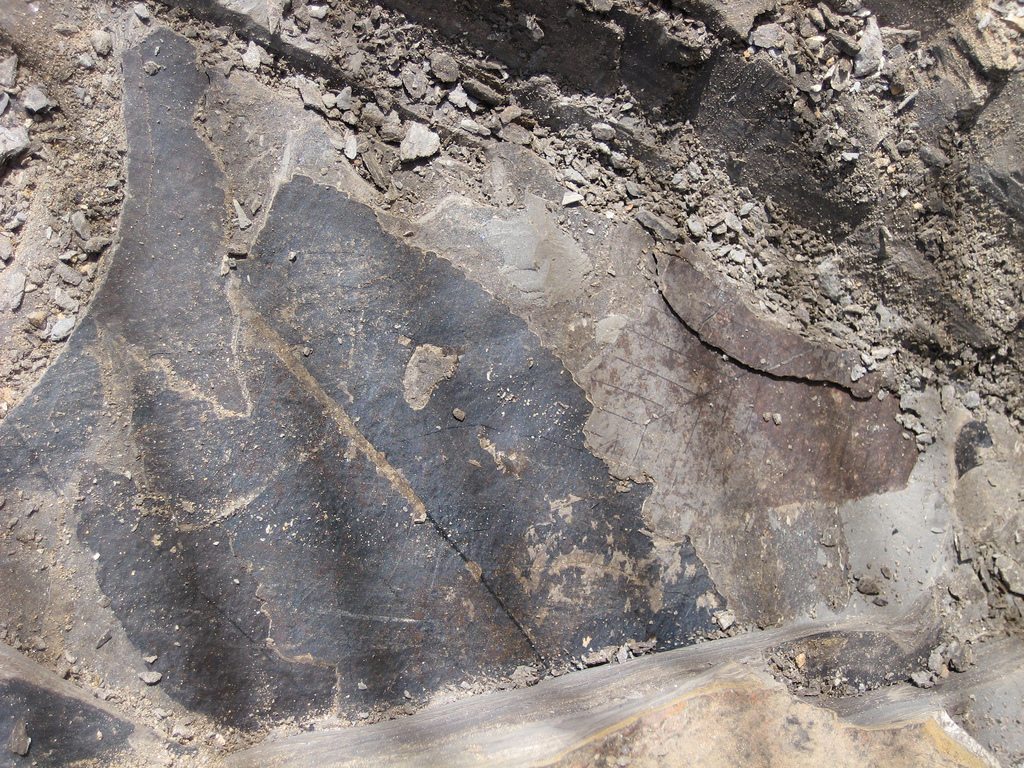
Fossil leaves from Clarkia fossil beds

The Clarkia fossil beds (also known locally as the Fossil Bowl) is a Miocene Latah Formation lagerstätte near Clarkia, Idaho.

The fossil beds were laid down in a lake roughly 15-million-years ago, when a drainage basin was dammed by the flood basalts of the Columbia River Plateau. Narrow and deep, the lake's cold, anoxic water and rapid sedimentation created perfect fossil conditions. The basin itself has remained tectonically stable, with little deformation since then. The fossils indicate that the region's climate was much warmer and wetter than today's, and similar to that of southern Florida.

Though a number of animal species have been found, the Clarkia fossil beds site is best known for its fossil leaves. Their preservation is exquisite; fresh leaves are unfossilized, and sometimes retain their fall colors before rapidly oxidizing in air. It has been reported that scientists have managed to isolate small amounts of ancient DNA from fossil leaves from this site. However, other scientists are skeptical of the validity of this reported occurrence of Miocene DNA. They have interpreted the DNA that has been recovered from these leaf fossils as contamination, probably from bacterial sources.
