= Halamphora =

Scientific classification
- Domain: Eukaryota
- Clade: Diaphoretickes
- Clade: SAR
- Clade: Stramenopiles
- Phylum: Gyrista
- Subphylum: Ochrophytina
- Class: Bacillariophyceae
- Order: Naviculales
- Family: Amphipleuraceae
- Genus: Halamphora; Mereschkowsky, 1903

Extant species
- Halamphora coffeaeformis; Halamphora hybrida

Genus of diatoms

Halamphora is a genus of diatoms belonging to the family Amphipleuraceae.

The genus was first described by C. Mereschkowsky in 1903.

The genus has cosmopolitan distribution.

Species:

- Halamphora coffeaeformis
- Halamphora hybrida
