= Epigloea =

Scientific classification
- Kingdom: Fungi
- Division: Ascomycota
- Subdivision: Pezizomycotina
- Family: Epigloeaceae; Zahlbr.
- Genus: Epigloea; Zukal

Family of fungi

Epigloea is a genus of fungi in the monotypic family Epigloeaceae.
