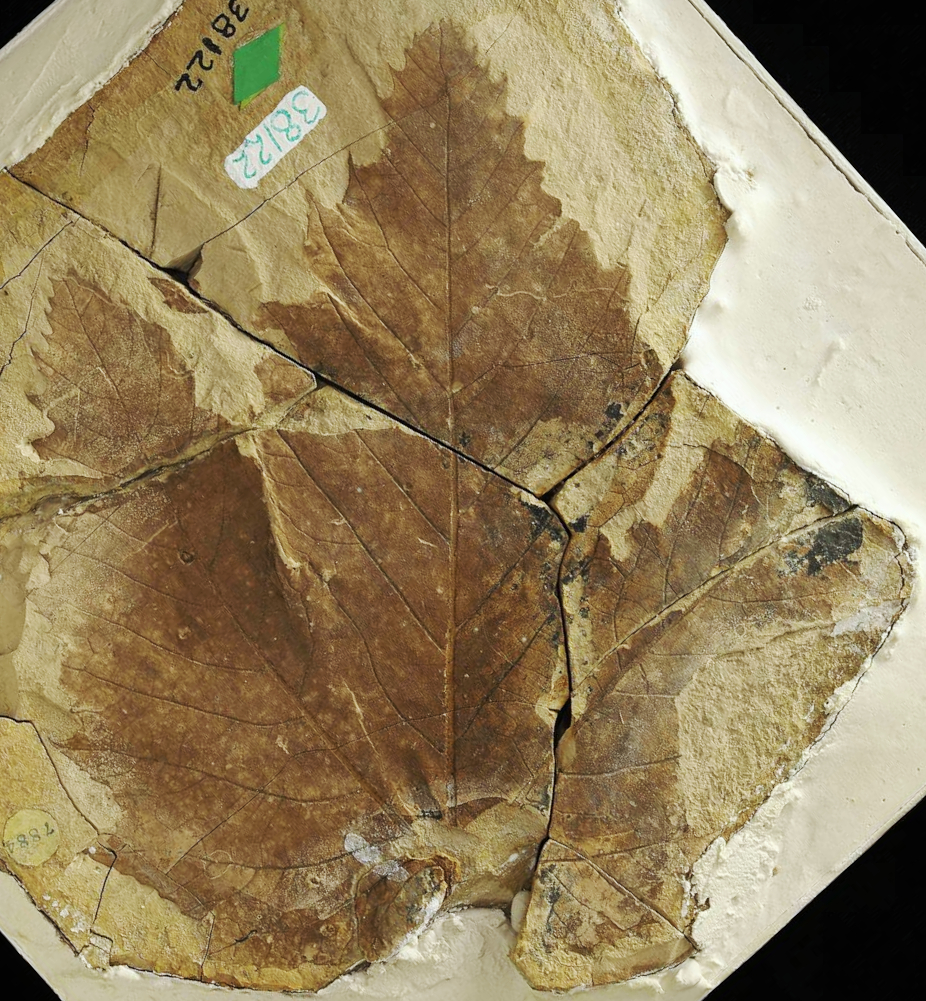

Scientific classification
- Kingdom: Plantae
- Clade: Tracheophytes
- Clade: Angiosperms
- Clade: Eudicots
- Order: Proteales
- Family: Platanaceae
- Genus: Platanus
- Species: †P. dissecta

Binomial name
- †Platanus dissecta Lesquereux

= Platanus dissecta =

Platanus dissecta Temporal range: Miocene

Extinct species of flowering plant

Platanus dissecta is an extinct species of plane tree in the family Platanaceae. It is known from fossil leaves dating to the Miocene of western North America. The species was first described by Leo Lesquereux and was reexamined in 2019 to clarify its morphology and systematic affinities.

== Background ==
Platanus dissecta lived during the Miocene epoch, approximately 23 to 5 million years ago. It belongs to the plane tree genus Platanus, which today includes the American sycamore and the Oriental plane.

== Morphology ==
The fossil leaves of P. dissecta are deeply dissected into lobes, with venation patterns that distinguish the species from other fossil and living Platanus taxa. These features suggest adaptation to the temperate environments of the Miocene.

== Systematic affinities ==
Platanus dissecta is placed in the family Platanaceae and shows close affinities with North American species of Platanus. The 2019 reanalysis suggested that it may share ancestry with the lineage leading to modern Platanus occidentalis.
