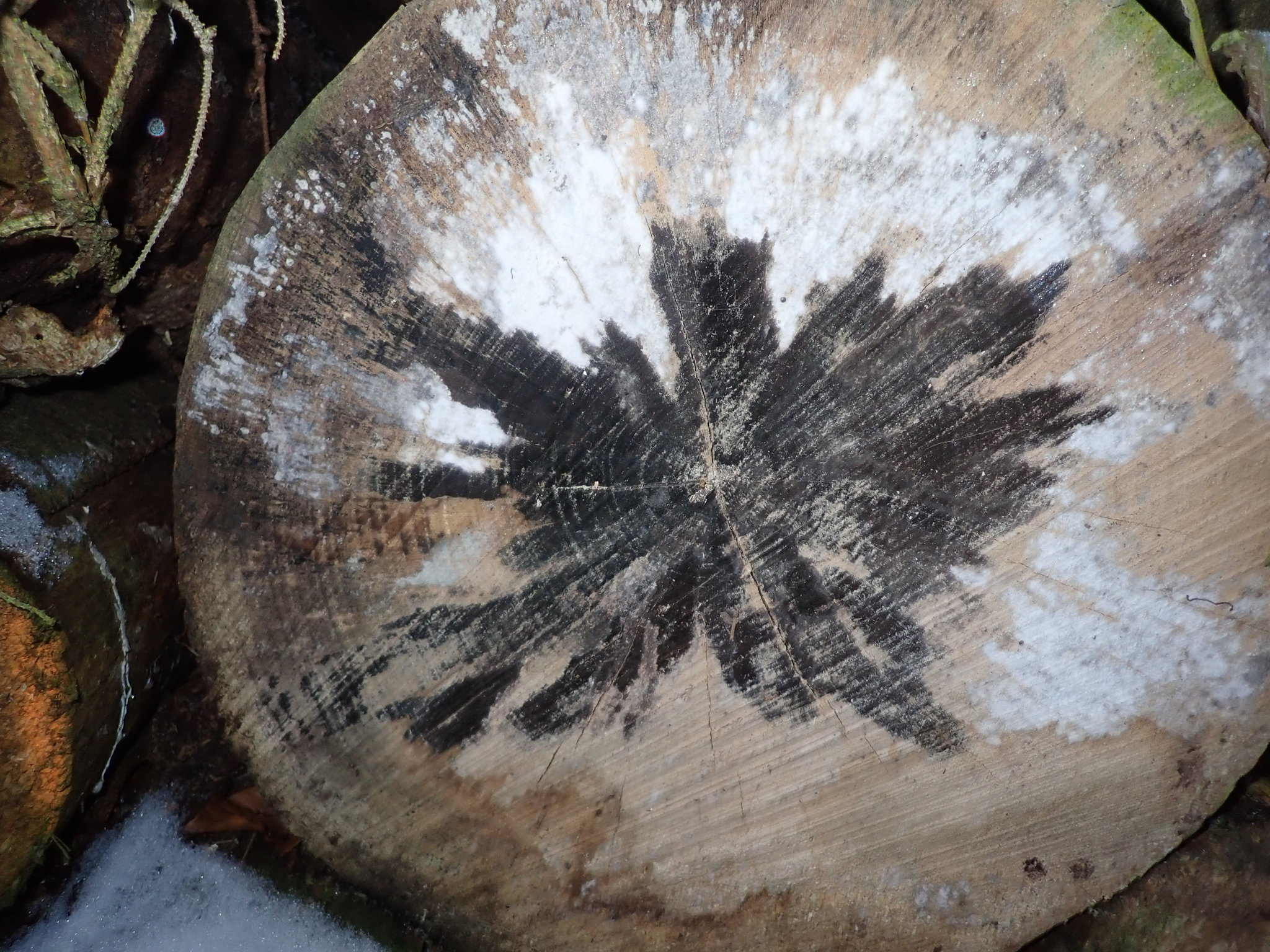
- Bispora pallescens

Scientific classification
- Kingdom: Fungi
- Division: Ascomycota
- Class: Leotiomycetes
- Order: Helotiales
- Family: Helotiaceae
- Genus: Bispora; Corda

= Bispora =

Genus of fungi

Bispora is a genus of fungi belonging to the family Helotiaceae.

The species of this genus are found in the entire world.

Species:

- Bispora aegles Rashmi Dubey & A.K.Pandey bis
- Bispora antennata (Pers.) E.W.Mason
- Bispora aterrima Berk. & Ravenel
