= Brachydesmiella =

Scientific classification
- Domain: Eukaryota
- Kingdom: Fungi
- Division: Ascomycota
- Class: incertae sedis
- Order: incertae sedis
- Family: incertae sedis
- Genus: Brachydesmiella; G. Arnaud ex S. Hughes, 1961

Type species
- Brachydesmiella biseptata G. Arnaud ex S. Hughes, 1961

Species
- See text

Genus of fungi

Brachydesmiella is a genus of Ascomycote fungus, one of many Ascomycota genera classified as incertae sedis.

== Species ==
Species accepted within Brachydesmiella include:

- Brachydesmiella anthostomelloidea
- Brachydesmiella biseptata
- Brachydesmiella biseptata
- Brachydesmiella brasiliensis
- Brachydesmiella caudate
- Brachydesmiella eugecapiellana
- Brachydesmiella obclavata
- Brachydesmiella orientalis
- Brachydesmiella verrucosa
