= Sphaerodes (fungus) =

Scientific classification
- Kingdom: Fungi
- Division: Ascomycota
- Class: Sordariomycetes
- Order: Coronophorales
- Family: incertae sedis
- Genus: Sphaerodes; Clem.

Type species
- Sphaerodes episphaerium (W. Phillips & Plowr.) Clem.

Species
- See text

Genus of fungi

Sphaerodes is a genus of fungi within the Coronophorales order but it has not been placed within a family.

== Species ==
As accepted by Species Fungorum;

- Sphaerodes beatonii (D. Hawksw.) P.F. Cannon & D. Hawksw. (1982)
- Sphaerodes compressa (Udagawa & Cain) P.F. Cannon & D. Hawksw. (1982)
- Sphaerodes episphaerium (W. Phillips & Plowr.) Clem. (1909)
- Sphaerodes manginii (Vincens) Arx (1981)
- Sphaerodes ornata (Zukal) Arx (1981)
- Sphaerodes perplexa (D. Hawksw.) P.F. Cannon & D. Hawksw. (1982)
- Sphaerodes retispora (Udagawa & Cain) P.F. Cannon & D. Hawksw. (1982)

Former species;

- S. ellipsospora (Takada) Dania García, Stchigel & Guarro (2004) = Dactylidispora ellipsospora, Melanosporales
- S. fimicola (E.C. Hansen) P.F. Cannon & D. Hawksw. (1982) = Microthecium fimicola, Ceratostomataceae
- S. inferior (Udagawa & Cain) D.W. Li & N.P. Schult. (2017) = Microthecium inferius, Ceratostomataceae
- S. levita (Udagawa & Cain) Dania García, Stchigel & Guarro (2004) = Microthecium levitum, Ceratostomataceae
- S. micropertusa Y. Horie, Udagawa & P.F. Cannon (1986) = Microthecium micropertusum, Ceratostomataceae
- S. moreaui Doguet ex Arx (1981) = Microthecium moreaui, Ceratostomataceae
- S. mycoparasitica Vujan. (2009) = Melanospora mycoparasitica, Ceratostomataceae
- S. quadrangularis Dania García, Stchigel & Guarro (2004) = Microthecium quadrangulare, Ceratostomataceae
- S. retispora var. inferior (Udagawa & Cain) P.F. Cannon & D. Hawksw. (1982) = Microthecium inferius, Ceratostomataceae
- S. singaporensis (Morinaga, Minoura & Udagawa) Dania García, Stchigel & Guarro (2004) = Dactylidispora singaporensis, Melanosporales
- S. tenuissima Dania García, Stchigel & Guarro (2004) = Microthecium tenuissimum, Ceratostomataceae
