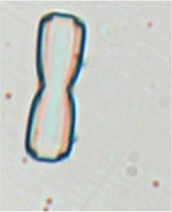
- Amphiprora sp.

Scientific classification
- Domain: Eukaryota
- Clade: Diaphoretickes
- Clade: SAR
- Clade: Stramenopiles
- Phylum: Gyrista
- Subphylum: Ochrophytina
- Class: Bacillariophyceae
- Order: Naviculales
- Family: Amphipleuraceae; Grunow, 1862

Genera
- See text

= Amphipleuraceae =

Family of diatoms

Amphiprora is a family of diatoms belonging to the order Naviculales. It contains eight accepted genera:

- Amphipleura Kützing 1844
- Amphiprora Ehrenberg 1843
- Cistula Cleve 1894
- Eileencoxia S.Blanco & C.E.Wetzel 2016
- Frustulia Rabenhorst 1853
- Halamphora (Cleve) Mereschkowsky 1903
- Pseudofrustulia Y.Sawai & T.Nagumo 2016
- Vanheurckia Brébisson, 1868
