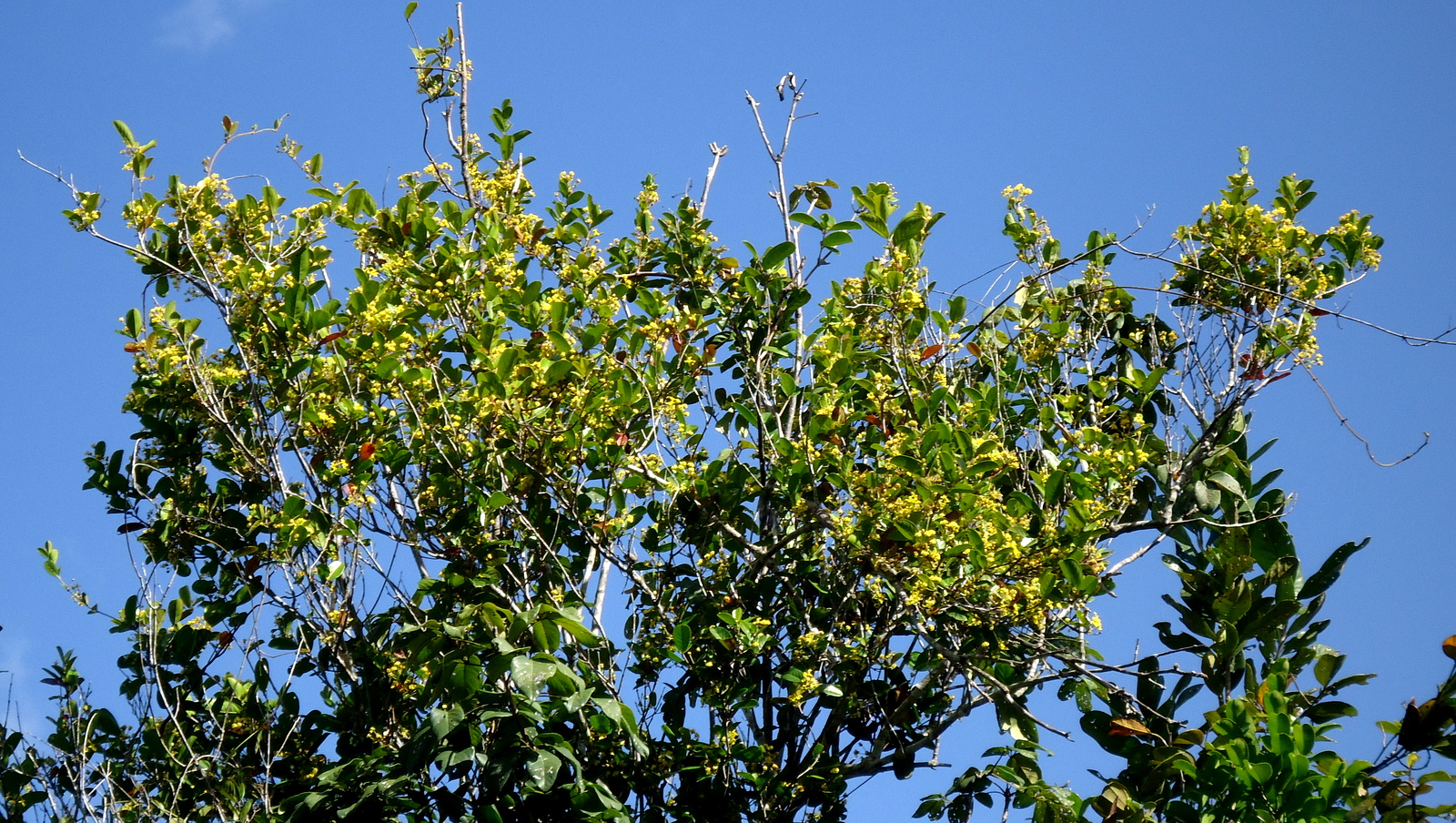
- Hiraea bullata

Scientific classification
- Kingdom: Plantae
- Clade: Tracheophytes
- Clade: Angiosperms
- Clade: Eudicots
- Clade: Rosids
- Order: Malpighiales
- Family: Malpighiaceae
- Genus: Hiraea; Jacq.

Species
- Over 55 species

= Hiraea =

Genus of flowering plants

Hiraea is a genus of flowering plants in the family Malpighiaceae. The genus Hiraea comprises over 55 species of woody vines and shrubs found in diverse habitats, except very dry vegetation types, in the New World tropics and subtropics from western Mexico to Paraguay and adjacent Argentina and south-eastern Brazil; it also occurs in the Lesser Antilles in Grenada and St. Lucia.

Hiraea faginea and H. fagifolia are among the most widespread species. Hiraea perplexa of Ecuador is included in the IUCN Red List of Threatened Species.
