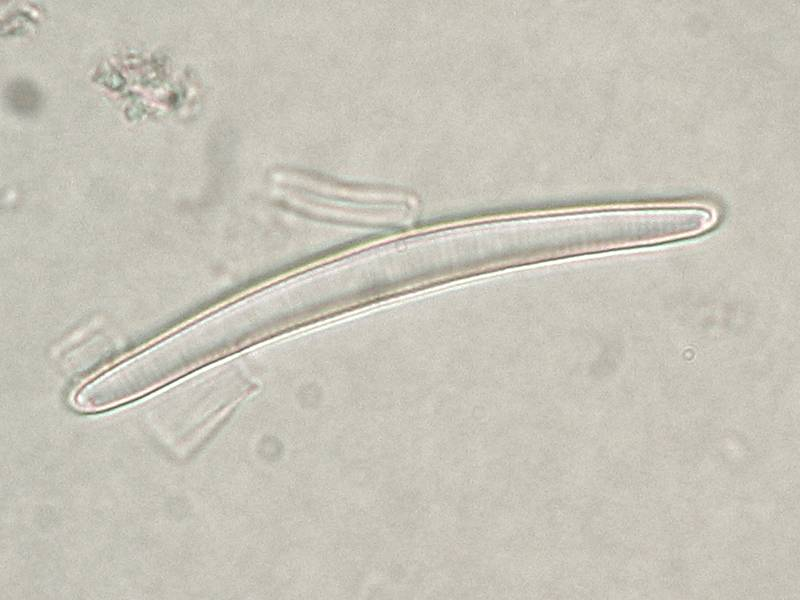
- Eunotia sp.

Scientific classification
- Domain: Eukaryota
- Supergroup: Stramenopiles
- Division: Ochrophyta
- Clade: Bacillariophyta
- Class: Bacillariophyceae
- Order: Eunotiales
- Family: Eunotiaceae
- Genus: Eunotia; Ehrenberg, 1837

Species
- Several, including: Eunotia cholnokyi; Eunotia elegans; Eunotia jogensis; Eunotia montana; Eunotia nehruii; Eunotia patrickii; Eunotia porcelloides; Eunotia rivularis; Eunotia saravathense; Eunotia subgibba; Eunotia sublunaris; Eunotia tumida

Synonyms
- Temachium Wallroth, 1833

= Eunotia =

Genus of single-celled organisms

Eunotia is a very common, globally widespread genus of diatoms. They are fresh water diatoms, specifically common in lakes, and they are also common in fossil records, although their siliceous wall design may have been lost.

The genus was originally described in 1837 by noted diatomist E. G. Ehrenburg.

Cells can be single, free, attached by stalks, or forming ribbon-like colonies.

== Morphology ==
Eunotia are unusual in their morphology in that they have extremely short raphe compared to other raphid species. The raphe start at the terminal nodes on the mantle, then curve onto the valve face, being visible in girdle view.

Valves are asymmetric. The dorsal valve edge is convex, smooth, or undulate. The ventral valve edge is straight or concave. Striae are uniseriate.
