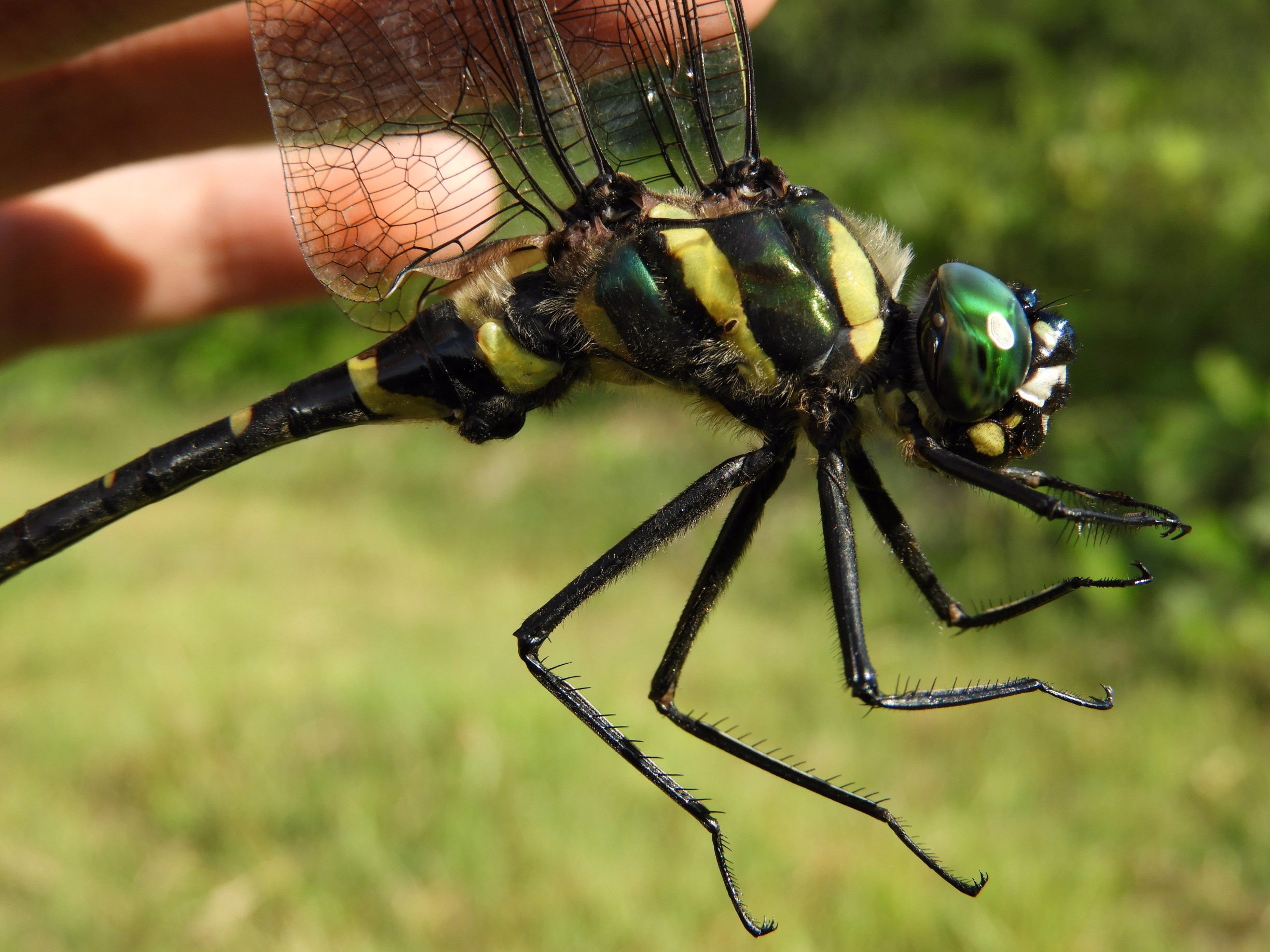
- Epophthalmia elegans

Scientific classification
- Kingdom: Animalia
- Phylum: Arthropoda
- Class: Insecta
- Order: Odonata
- Infraorder: Anisoptera
- Family: Macromiidae
- Genus: Epophthalmia; Burmeister, 1839

= Epophthalmia =

Genus of dragonflies

Epophthalmia a genus of dragonflies in the family Macromiidae.

== Species ==
The genus contains the following species:

Male	Female	Scientific name	Common name	Distribution
		Epophthalmia australis Hagen, 1867		Celebes, Borneo, Australia
		Epophthalmia bannaensis L.S. Zha & Y.H. Jiang 2010		China (Yunnan)
		Epophthalmia elegans (Brauer, 1865)	regal pond cruiser	Japan, Australia
		Epophthalmia frontalis Selys, 1871		India, Nepal, Thailand, Malaysia
		Epophthalmia kuani Jiang, 1998		China (Jiangsu)
		Epophthalmia vittata Burmeister, 1839	common torrent hawk	India, Sri Lanka, and Indonesia.
		Epophthalmia vittigera (Rambur, 1842)		Borneo
