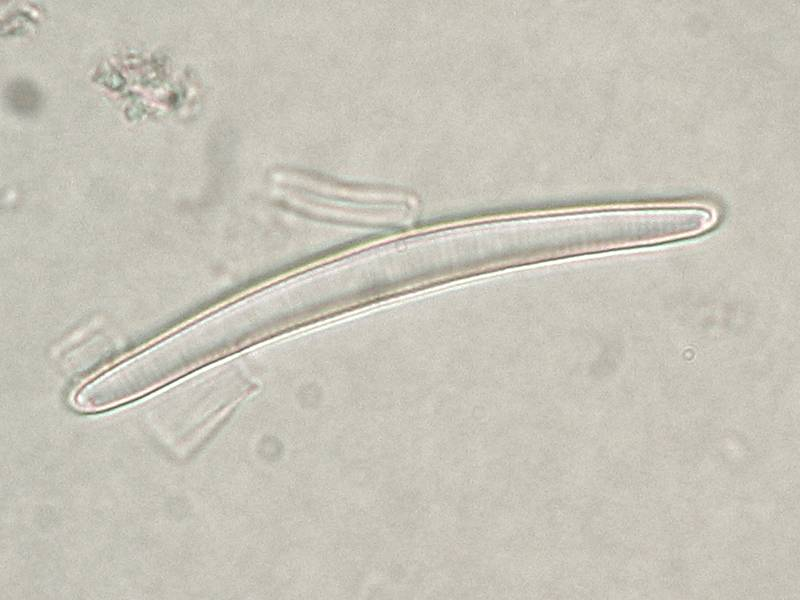
- Eunotia sp.

Scientific classification
- Domain: Eukaryota
- Clade: Sar
- Clade: Stramenopiles
- Phylum: Ochrophyta
- Clade: Diatomeae
- Subphylum: Bacillariophytina
- Class: Bacillariophyceae
- Subclass: Bacillariophycidae
- Order: Eunotiales
- Family: Eunotiaceae; Kützing, 1844

Genera
- See text

= Eunotiaceae =

Proposed family of diatoms

Eunotiaceae is a proposed family of diatoms in the order Eunotiales that includes the following genera:

- Actinella F.W. Lewis, 1864
- Amphicampa (C.G. Ehrenberg) J. Ralfs in A. Pritchard, 1861
- Amphorotia G.M. Williams & G. Reid, 2006
- Burliganiella C.E.Wetzel & Kociolek
- Bicudoa C.E.Wetzel, Lange-Bertalot & L.Ector, 2012
- Colliculoamphora D.M. Williams & G. Reid, 2006 †
- Desmogonium C.G. Ehrenberg in R. Schomburgk, 1848
- Eunotia C.G. Ehrenberg, 1837
- Eunotioforma J.P.Kociolek & A.L.Burliga, 2013
- Euodia J.W. Bailey ex J. Ralfs in A. Pritchard, 1861
- Perinotia D. Metzeltin & H. Lange-Bertalot, 2007
- Semiorbis R. Patrick in R. Patrick & C.W. Reimer, 1966
- Temachium Wallroth, 1833

== Description ==
- Valves with bilateral symmetry (symmetric about a line)
- Valves often asymmetrical to the apical axis
- Raphe system is short and provides weak motility
- Raphe located on valve mantle and face
- Cells may possess 2 or more rimoportulae (labiate processes)
