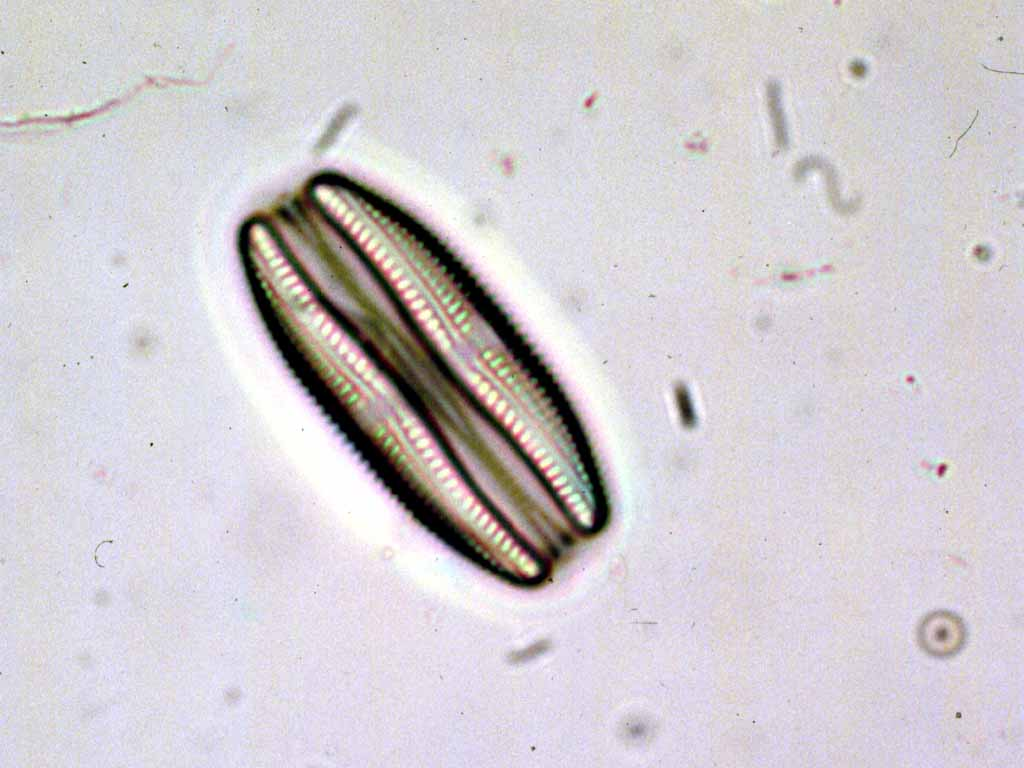
- Amphora ovalis

Scientific classification
- Domain: Eukaryota
- Clade: Sar
- Clade: Stramenopiles
- Division: Ochrophyta
- Clade: Bacillariophyta
- Class: Bacillariophyceae
- Order: Surirellales
- Family: Surirellaceae
- Genus: Amphora; Ehrenberg ex Kützing, 1844

Type species
- Amphora ovalis (Kützing) Kützing

Species
- See text

= Amphora (diatom) =

Genus of single-celled organisms

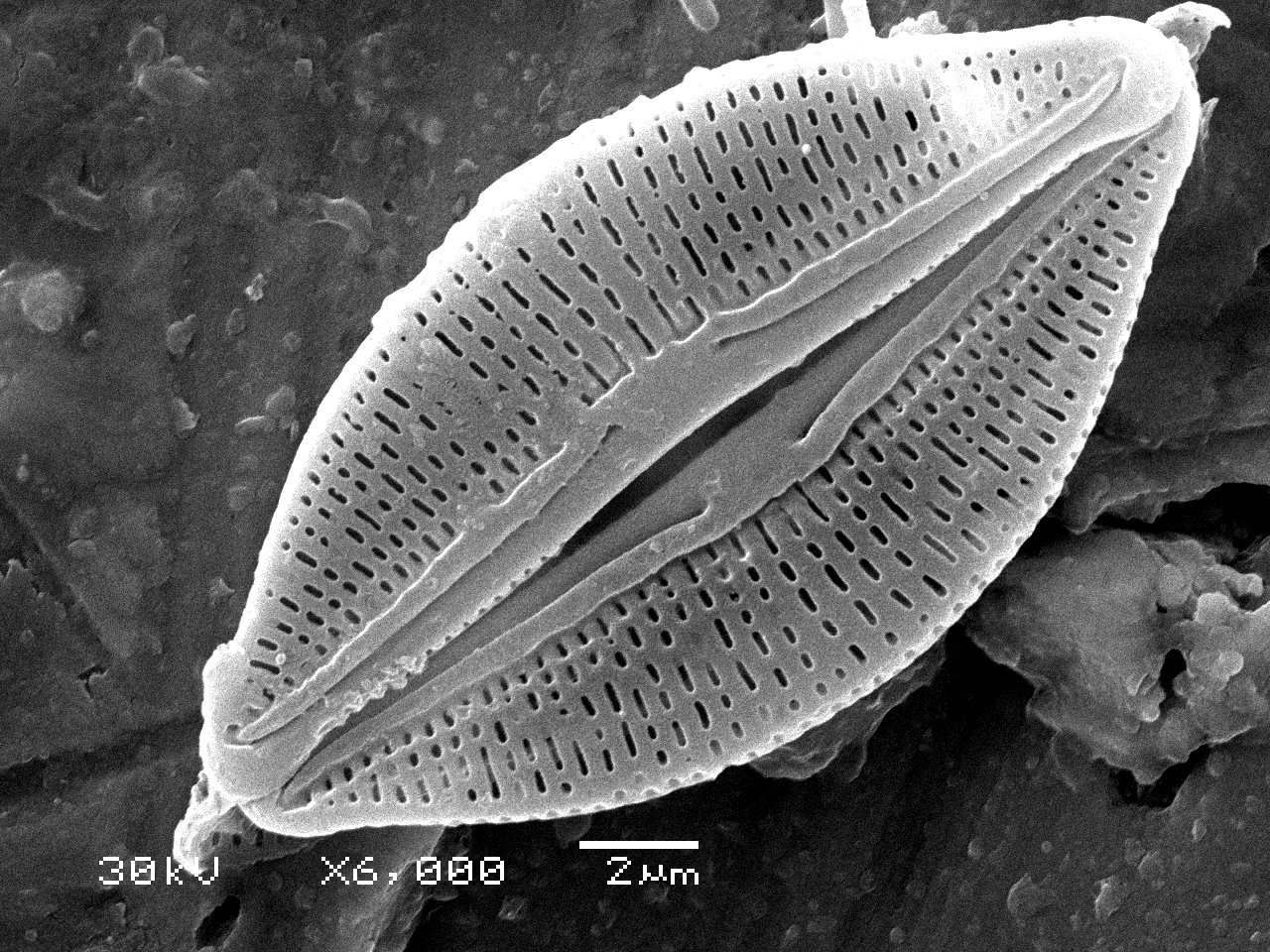
Silicified cell wall of an Amphora species consisting of two valves or overlapping halves

Amphora is a major genus of marine and freshwater diatoms. With over 1000 species, it is one of the largest genera of diatoms. These diatoms are recognized by their strongly dorsiventral frustules, which means that their ridges lie close to the ventral margin of the valve, and their girdle is much wider on the dorsal side.

== Taxonomy ==
The following species, varieties and forms are known:

=== A ===
- Amphora abludens R.Simonsen
- Amphora absoluta Levkov
- Amphora accomoda Levkov
- Amphora acuta W.Gregory
  - Amphora acuta var. japonica Skvortzov
  - Amphora acuta var. labyrinthica (Grunow) Cleve
  - Amphora acuta var. media Heiden
  - Amphora acuta var. minor Foged
  - Amphora acuta var. neogena Pantocsek
  - Amphora acuta var. parva A.H.Wachnicka & E.E.Gaiser
- Amphora acutissima M.H.Giffen
  - Amphora acutiuscula f. branderi R.Tynni
  - Amphora acutiuscula var. fossilis Pantocsek
  - Amphora acutiuscula var. neglecta R.d'Aubert
  - Amphora acutiuscula var. parvula K.S.Mereschkowsky
- Amphora adumbrata M.H.Hohn & J.Hellerman
- Amphora advena S.L.Van Landingham
- Amphora aegaea Ehrenberg
- Amphora aequalis Krammer
- Amphora aestuarii Cleve
- Amphora affiniformis Levkov
- Amphora affinis Kützing
- Amphora africana H.Heiden
  - Amphora africana var. undulata H.Heiden
- Amphora agapica N.A.Skabichevskaya
- Amphora ajajensis Skabichevskii (Skabitschevsky)
- Amphora alaeziarum Álvarez-Blanco & S.Blanco
- Amphora alata H.Peragallo
- Amphora alata Pomazkina & E.V.Rodionova
  - Amphora alata var. aptera Cleve
  - Amphora alata var. major Cleve
- Amphora aliformis J.G.Stepanek, S. Mayama & Kociolek
- Amphora allanta M.H.Hohn & J.Hellerman
- Amphora alpestris Levkov
- Amphora alpha Karsten
- Amphora alternata A.Mann
- Amphora alveolata G.Leuduger-Fortmorel
- Amphora ambigua Meister
- Amphora americana A.H.Wachnicka & E.E.Gaiser
- Amphora amoena Hustedt
- Amphora amphioxys Bailey
- Amphora ampla Ehrenberg
- Amphora anceps A.Mann
- Amphora andesitica Pantocsek
  - Amphora angularis var. caspica N.I.Karaeva
  - Amphora angularis var. delicatula A.I.Proshkina-Lavrenko
  - Amphora angulosa var. ceylanica Skvortzov
- Amphora angusta W.Gregory
  - Amphora angusta f. minuta Grunow
  - Amphora angusta var. adeliae Manguin
  - Amphora angusta var. angustissima H.F.Van Heurck
  - Amphora angusta var. arctica Grunow
  - Amphora angusta var. ceylanics Skvortzov
  - Amphora angusta var. chinensis Skvortzow (Skvortsov)
  - Amphora angusta var. diducta (A.W.F.Schmidt) Cleve
  - Amphora angusta var. glaberrima Grunow
  - Amphora angusta var. gracilenta Grunow ex A.W.F.Schmidt
  - Amphora angusta var. incurvata (J.-J.Brun) Cleve
  - Amphora angusta var. oblongella (Grunow) Cleve
  - Amphora angusta var. oblongella (Grunow) Cleve
  - Amphora angusta var. okamurae Skvortzov
  - Amphora angusta var. orientalis A.A.Aleem
  - Amphora angusta var. sinensis Skvortzov
  - Amphora angusta var. typica Cleve
  - Amphora angusta var. typica f. depressa Skvortzov
  - Amphora angusta var. ventricosa f. japonica Skvortzov
  - Amphora angusta var. zebrina (A.W.F.Schmidt) Cleve
- Amphora angustissima (H.F.Van Heurck) A.Mann
- Amphora angustissima H.Heiden
- Amphora antiqua Cleve & Grove
  - Amphora aponina f. major G.Rabenhorst
- Amphora araucariana Frenguelli
- Amphora araulensis Héribaud-Joseph
- Amphora arcana M.H.Giffen
- Amphora archibaldii A.H.Wachnicka & E.E.Gaiser
- Amphora arcta A.W.F.Schmidt
- Amphora arcuata A.W.F.Schmidt
- Amphora arcuatoides Ognjanova, Metzeltin & Levkov
- Amphora arcus W.Gregory
  - Amphora arcus f. typica Cleve
  - Amphora arcus var. major Maurice Peragallo
  - Amphora arcus var. sulcata Cleve
- Amphora arenaria Donkin
  - Amphora arenaria var. donkinii Rabenhorst
  - Amphora arenaria var. rattrayi Cleve
- Amphora arenicola Grunow ex Cleve
  - Amphora arenicola var. minor McCall
  - Amphora arenicola var. oculata Cleve
  - Amphora arenicola var. subaequalis Cleve
- Amphora areolata Grunow
  - Amphora areolata var. curta Cleve & Grove
  - Amphora areolata var. curta Cleve
  - Amphora areolata var. elegans M.Peragallo
  - Amphora areolata var. maxima Cleve & Grove
  - Amphora areolata var. minor Cleve & Grove
- Amphora argus Pantocsek
- Amphora ascensionis G.Leuduger-Fortmorel
- Amphora aspera Petit
- Amphora astuarii Cleve
- Amphora athanasii M.Peragallo
- Amphora atlantica G.Leuduger-Fortmorel
- Amphora atomoides Levkov
- Amphora australiensis J.John
- Amphora australis P.C.M.Petit
- Amphora ayensuensis Foged

=== B ===
- Amphora baccata A.Mann
- Amphora bacillaris Gregory
- Amphora baicalensis Skvortzow & K.I.Meyer
- Amphora baicalomicra E.V.Rodionova & Pomazkina
- Amphora baicalopseudoeximia Pomazkina & E.V.Rodionova
- Amphora balatonis Pantocsek
- Amphora banyaiana P.Greguss & Weber
- Amphora barrei Manguin
- Amphora beaufortiana Hustedt
- Amphora behringensis Cleve
- Amphora bella Hustedt
- Amphora berolinensis N.Abarca & R.Jahn
  - Amphora berriati var. minor R.d'Aubart
- Amphora berriatii Héribaud-Joseph
- Amphora beta Karsten
- Amphora biarcuata H.Heiden
- Amphora biconvexa C.Janisch
- Amphora biggiba Grunow
- Amphora biggibosa Cleve
- Amphora bigibba Grunow
  - Amphora bigibba var. interrupta (Grunow) Cleve
- Amphora bigibbosa Cleve
- Amphora binodis W.Gregory
- Amphora bioculata Cleve
- Amphora birnirkiana Patrick & Freese
- Amphora birugula M.H.Hohn
- Amphora biseriata W.Gregory
- Amphora bistriata G.Leuduger-Fortmorel
- Amphora bitumida G.A.Prowse
- Amphora bituminosa Pantocsek
- Amphora biundulata L.Bérard-Therriault, A.Cardinal, & M.Poulin
- Amphora blanda G.Leuduger-Fortmorel
- Amphora bongrainii M.Peragallo
- Amphora borealis Schumann
- Amphora borisii Levkov
- Amphora bornatii Héribaud-Joseph
- Amphora boryana Pantocsek
- Amphora brasiliensis Zimmermann
- Amphora brebissonii Maurice Peragallo
  - Amphora brebissonii var. minor Maurice Peragallo
- Amphora brehmii Hustedt
- Amphora brevis Levkov
- Amphora buczkoae Levkov
- Amphora budayana Pantocsek
- Amphora bulgarica Ognjanova, Metzeltin & Levkov
- Amphora bullata Cleve
- Amphora bullosa (Fiorini) Fiorini-Mazzanti

=== C ===
- Amphora calumetica (Thomas ex Wolle) M.Peragallo
- Amphora calumeticoides Cocquyt
- Amphora camelus Cleve & Grove
- Amphora capensis A.W.F.Schmidt
- Amphora capitata F.Meister
- Amphora capitata R.Brander
- Amphora capitellata Frenguelli
- Amphora caribaea A.H.Wachnicka & E.E.Gaiser
- Amphora carinata Ehrenberg
- Amphora catharinaria B.J.Cholnoky
- Amphora caucasica Peragallo M.
- Amphora ceylanensis G.Lauduger-Fortmorel
- Amphora chadzhibeiensis Gusliakov
- Amphora charcotii M.Peragallo
- Amphora charrua Metzeltin, Lange-Bertalot & García-Rodríguez
- Amphora cimbrica Østrup
  - Amphora cimbrica var. tenuis Levkov
- Amphora cingulata Cleve
- Amphora cingulata Pantocsek
  - Amphora cingulata var. hyalina M.M.Salah
- Amphora clathrata A.Mann
- Amphora clevei Grunow
- Amphora coarcta G.Leuduger-Fortmorel
- Amphora coarctata G.Leuduger-Fortmorel
- Amphora coffaeiformis (C.Agardh) Kützing
  - Amphora coffeiformis f. curta Poretzky & Anissimova
  - Amphora coffeiformis f. subconstricta (Grunow) Zabelina
  - Amphora coffeiformis var. africana F.E.Fritsch & M.F.Rich
  - Amphora coffeiformis var. africana f. kurze Venkataraman
  - Amphora coffeiformis var. asiatica F.Meister
  - Amphora coffeiformis var. bhusavalensis P.T.Sarode & N.D.Kamat
  - Amphora coffeiformis var. exigue (W.Gregory) G.Rabenhorst
  - Amphora coffeiformis var. fischeri Kützing
  - Amphora coffeiformis var. fossilis (Pantocsek) Cleve
  - Amphora coffeiformis var. fossilis Pantocsek
  - Amphora coffeiformis var. hungarica Cleve
  - Amphora coffeiformis var. protracta (Pantocsek) Cleve
  - Amphora coffeiformis var. salinarum Grunow
  - Amphora coffeiformis var. tenuissima Proshkina-Lavrenko
  - Amphora coffeiformis var. thumensis Ant.Mayer
- Amphora cognata B.J.Cholnoky
- Amphora commutata Grunow
  - Amphora commutata f. constricta Liebetanz
  - Amphora commutata var. constricta K.S.Mereschkowsky
  - Amphora commutata var. fossilis (Pantocsek) Cleve
- Amphora comorensis Cleve
- Amphora compacta A.Mann
- Amphora composita C.Janisch
- Amphora confusa Levkov & Metzeltin
- Amphora conjuncta Pantocsek
- Amphora conserta (Lewis) Grunow
- Amphora constricta (Ehrenberg) W.Carruthers
- Amphora contorta G.Leuduger-Fortmorel
- Amphora contracta Grunow
- Amphora copulata (Kützing) Schoeman & R.E.M.Archibald
- Amphora copulatoides J.G.Stepanek & Kociolek
- Amphora corinata Ehrenberg
- Amphora corpulenta Cleve & Grove
  - Amphora corpulenta var. capitata Tempere & Maurice Peragallo
  - Amphora costata var. inflata (Grunow) H.Peragallo & M.Peragallo
- Amphora costulata Skvortzow (Skvortsov)
- Amphora crassa W.Gregory
  - Amphora crassa var. antarctica Maurice Peragallo
  - Amphora crassa var. campechiana Grunow
  - Amphora crassa var. degenerate Cleve
  - Amphora crassa var. elongata Cleve
  - Amphora crassa var. gemmata A.Jurilj
  - Amphora crassa var. incurva Grunow
  - Amphora crassa var. interlineata (Grove & G.Sturt) Cleve
  - Amphora crassa var. interrupta J.-M.Lin & T.G.Chin
  - Amphora crassa var. minor Pantocsek
  - Amphora crassa var. modesta Cleve
  - Amphora crassa var. oceanica H.Heiden
  - Amphora crassa var. punctata Grunow
  - Amphora crassa var. seychellensis Cleve
  - Amphora crassa var. soelswigiensis (P.C.M.Petit) Cleve
  - Amphora crassa var. spuria Cleve
- Amphora crawfordii Levkov & Metzeltin
- Amphora crenulata A.H.Wachnicka & E.E.Gaiser
- Amphora crescens A.Mann
- Amphora crispans Pomazkina & E.V.Rodionova
- Amphora cristata Petit
- Amphora cristodentata Skabichevskii (Skabitschevsky)
- Amphora cruciata Østrup
- Amphora crucifera A.Cleve
- Amphora cruciferoides Stoermer & J.J.Yang
- Amphora crystallina Ehrenberg
- Amphora cucumaris A.Mann
- Amphora cuneatiformis Levkov & Kristic
- Amphora curvata Pantocsek
- Amphora cyclops G.Leuduger-Fortmorel
- Amphora cymbamphora Cholnoky
- Amphora cymbaphora Cholnoky
  - Amphora cymbelloides var. mauritiana Grunow
- Amphora cymbellula K.S.Mereschkowsky
- Amphora cymbifera A.W.F.Schmidt
  - Amphora cymbifera var. heritierarum A.H.Wachnicka & E.E.Gaiser
  - Amphora cymbifera var. rara Frenguelli
- Amphora cymbiformis Cleve
- Amphora cymbiformis Ehrenberg
- Amphora czekehazensis Pantocsek

=== D ===
- Amphora dalaica Skvortzov
  - Amphora dalaica var. cornuta Skvortzov
  - Amphora dalaica var. gracilis Skvortzov
  - Amphora dalaica var. hinganica Skvortzov
  - Amphora dalaica var. oculata Skvortzov
- Amphora de-tonii J.-J.Brun
- Amphora debyi G.Leuduger-Fortmorel
- Amphora decipiens Grunow
- Amphora decloitrei A.Amossé
  - Amphora decloitrei var. rufisquiana A.Amossé
- Amphora decora F.S.Castracane degli Antelminelli
  - Amphora decussata var. briocensis G.Leuduger-Fortmorel
- Amphora deflecta G.W.Andrews
- Amphora delicatissima Krasske
- Amphora delicatula L.S.Bljumina
- Amphora delphina L.W.Bailey
- Amphora delphinea Cleve
  - Amphora delphinea var. jamalinensis (Cleve & Grunow) Cleve
  - Amphora delphinea var. minor Cleve
- Amphora delphineiformis Levkov
- Amphora delta G.Karst
- Amphora densestriata Stoermer & J.J.Yang
- Amphora densistriata Hajós
- Amphora dentata Edlund & Levkov
- Amphora diaphana Cleve
- Amphora dichotoma A.Mann
- Amphora difficilis Levkov
- Amphora digitus A.W.F.Schmidt
- Amphora dissimilis Metzeltin & Krammer
- Amphora distincta Héribaud-Joseph
- Amphora divisa G.Leuduger-Fortmorel
- Amphora domkeana A.Jurilj
- Amphora donkinii Rabenhorst
- Amphora dorsalis Cleve & Grove
- Amphora dubia W.Gregory
- Amphora dura A.Mann
- Amphora duseni J.-J.Brun
  - Amphora duseni f. simplex Krasske

=== E ===
- Amphora eatoniana O'Meara
- Amphora ectorii Levkov
- Amphora edlundii Levkov
- Amphora egregia Ehrenberg
  - Amphora egregia var. neogradensis Pantocsek
- Amphora ehta G.Karst
- Amphora elegans H.Peragallo
- Amphora elegantula Hustedt
- Amphora elongata Gregory
- Amphora enoculata Héribaud-Joseph
- Amphora epiphytica Skvortzov
- Amphora epsilon G.Karst
- Amphora erebi Ehrenberg
- Amphora erezii Reimer & Lee
- Amphora ergadensis Gregory
  - Amphora eulensteinii var. fossilis Pantocsek
  - Amphora eunotia var. baltica A.Cleve
  - Amphora eunotia var. gigantea Grunow
  - Amphora eunotia var. japonica Skvortzov (Skvortsow)
  - Amphora eunotia var. striolata Frenguelli
- Amphora eunotiaeformis Grunow
- Amphora euprepes Pantocsek
- Amphora evanida M.H.Giffen
- Amphora excisa Gregory
- Amphora excludens A.Mann
- Amphora exiliata Giffen
- Amphora exilissima M.H.Giffen
- Amphora exilitata M.H.Giffen
- Amphora eximia J.R.Carter
- Amphora exornata Janisch
- Amphora exsecta Grunow
- Amphora extensa Salah

=== F ===
- Amphora fallax J.A.Tempère & J.-J.Brun
- Amphora farcimen Grunow
  - Amphora farcimen var. crassa M.Peragallo
  - Amphora farcimen var. gigantea M.Peragallo
- Amphora farciminosa M.Peragallo
- Amphora favus E.V.Rodionova & Pomazkina
- Amphora ferrazae B.J.Cholnoky
- Amphora fimbriata Cleve & Grove
- Amphora finlandica Levkov
- Amphora fischeri (Kützing) Kützing
- Amphora flammiger G.Leuduger-Fortmorel
- Amphora flebilis R.Simonsen
- Amphora flexa A.Mann
- Amphora flexuosa Grev.
- Amphora floridae A.H.Wachnicka & E.E.Gaiser
- Amphora fluminensis Grunow
  - Amphora fluminensis var. curta R.d'Aubert
- Amphora fonticola Maillard
- Amphora formosa Cleve
- Amphora formosa G.Leuduger-Fortmorel
  - Amphora formosa var. minuta Cleve
- Amphora fossilis Pantocsek
- Amphora foveauxiana F.J.R.Taylor
- Amphora francescae M.H.Giffen
- Amphora furcata G.Leuduger-Fortmorel
  - Amphora fusca f. lata M.Peragallo

=== G ===
- Amphora gamma G.Karst
- Amphora gamtoosae M.H.Giffen
- Amphora geinitzii Heiden
- Amphora gemmifera P.C.M.Petit
- Amphora genkalii Gusliakov
- Amphora gibberula Missuna
- Amphora gieskesii B.J.Cholnoky
- Amphora gigantea Grunow
  - Amphora gigantea f. minor Cleve
  - Amphora gigantea var. andesitica Pantocsek
  - Amphora gigantea var. fusca (A.W.F.Schmidt) Cleve
  - Amphora gigantea var. gigantea Grunow ex A.W.F.Schmidt
  - Amphora gigantea var. obscura Cleve
- Amphora globosa Schumann
  - Amphora globosa var. perpusilla Grunow
- Amphora globulosa J.Schumann
- Amphora gobii K.S.Mereschkowsky
- Amphora gourdonii M.Peragallo
- Amphora gouwsii B.J.Cholnoky
- Amphora gracilis Ehrenberg
  - Amphora gracilis f. parva A.Truan y Luard
- Amphora graeffeana Hendey
- Amphora graeffei Grunow
  - Amphora graeffei var. minor Maurice Peragallo
  - Amphora graeffii var. staurophora Cleve
- Amphora gramenorum A.H.Wachnicka & E.E.Gaiser
- Amphora grammatica Pomazkina & E.V.Rodionova
- Amphora granii Pantocsek
- Amphora granularis Pomazkina & E.V.Rodionova
  - Amphora granulata var. biggibosa M.Ricard
  - Amphora granulata var. costata Proshkina-Lavrenko
  - Amphora granulata var. lineata M.Peragallo
  - Amphora granulata var. punctata Proshkina-Lavrenko
- Amphora granulifera Cleve
- Amphora gregorii Ralfs
- Amphora gregoryi Ralfs
- Amphora grevilleana W.Gregory
  - Amphora grevilleana var. campechiana Grunow
  - Amphora grevilleana var. contracta Cleve
  - Amphora grevilleana var. indentata M.Ricard
  - Amphora grevilleana var. prominens Grunow
  - Amphora grevilleana var. sepulta Pantocsek
- Amphora grevilliana W.Gregory
  - Amphora grevilliana var. complexa (W.Gregory) G.Rabenhorst
  - Amphora grevilliana var. fasciata (W.Gregory) G.Rabenhorst
- Amphora groenlandica Cleve
- Amphora groenlandica Østrup
- Amphora grovei Cleve
- Amphora gruendleri Grunow
  - Amphora gruendleri var. approximata Cleve
  - Amphora gruendleri var. robusta Cleve
  - Amphora gruendlerii var. trachytica Pantocsek
- Amphora grunowii A.W.F.Schmidt
- Amphora guinardii Maurice Peragallo
- Amphora guinense G.Leuduger-Fortmorel
- Amphora gulfusiis M.M.Salah & Tamás

=== H ===
- Amphora hamata Heiden
- Amphora hassiaca Krammer & S.Strecker
- Amphora helenensis Giffen
- Amphora hemicycla Stoermer & J.J.Yang
- Amphora henshawii A.Mann
- Amphora heterostriata Mereschkowski
- Amphora hevesensis Pantocsek
- Amphora hians J.H.L.Flögel
- Amphora hidasensis Hajós
- Amphora hilliardii Manguin
- Amphora hinzae Levkov
- Amphora hiromuii Nagumo
- Amphora hirundinella J.-J.Brun
  - Amphora holsatica var. malayana G.A.Prowse
  - Amphora holsatica var. tenera N.I.Karaeva
  - Amphora holsatica var. ventrestriata Ø.Berg
  - Amphora holsatica var. ventrestriata f. pyriformis Ø.Berg
- Amphora holsaticoides T.Nagumo & H.Kobayasi
- Amphora honshuensis A.Mann
- Amphora humicola Grunow
  - Amphora humicola var. javanica Grunow
- Amphora hungarica P.Palik
- Amphora huronensis Stoermer & J.J.Yang
- Amphora hustedtii Levkov
- Amphora hyalina Kützing
  - Amphora hyalina f. parvula Grunow
  - Amphora hyalina var. delicatula Proshkina-Lavrenko
  - Amphora hyalina var. impalpabilis A.I.Proshkina-Lavrenko
- Amphora hyperborea Grunow

=== I ===
- Amphora ignorata Levkov
- Amphora ignota B.J.Cholnoky
- Amphora immarginata Nagumo
- Amphora impercepta F.Meister
- Amphora imperfecta Manguin
- Amphora inariensis Krammer
- Amphora incerta A.W.F.Schmidt
- Amphora incisa Hajós
- Amphora inconspicua A.I.Proshkina-Lavrenko
- Amphora incrassata M.H.Giffen
- Amphora incredulata M.H.Giffen
- Amphora incurva W.Gregory
- Amphora incurvata J.R.Carter
- Amphora indentata A.H.Wachnicka & E.E.Gaiser
- Amphora indistincta Levkov
- Amphora inelegans Cleve & Grove
  - Amphora inelegans var. polita Cleve
- Amphora inflata Grunow
- Amphora inornata Cleve
- Amphora insolita Pomazkina & E.V.Rodionova
- Amphora interlineata Grove & G.Sturt
- Amphora intersecta A.W.F.Schmidt
  - Amphora intersecta var. sarmatica Pantocsek
  - Amphora intersecta var. striata Pantocsek
- Amphora invidenda Pantocsek

=== J ===
- Amphora jacksoni Schrader
  - Amphora jamaliensis var. fossilis Pantocsek
- Amphora janischii A.W.F.Schmidt
- Amphora japonica F.Meister
- Amphora javanica A.W.F.Schmidt
  - Amphora javanica var. oculata M.Peragallo
- Amphora javorkaae Szemes
- Amphora jeniseyensis Skvortzov
- Amphora jeschkei C.Janisch
- Amphora jostesorum Witkowski, Lange-Bertalot & Metzeltin

=== K ===
- Amphora kamorthensis Grunow
  - Amphora kamorthensis f. minor Grunow
- Amphora karajevae Gusliakov
- Amphora katii Selva
- Amphora kenyaensis F.Gasse
- Amphora kerguelensis H.Heiden
- Amphora kertschiana Pantocsek
- Amphora kittonii G.Leuduger-Fortmorel
- Amphora kolbei Skvortzov
- Amphora koshovii Skabichevskij
- Amphora kossuthii Pantocsek
- Amphora krammeri Levkov & Metzeltin

=== L ===
- Amphora labuensis Cleve
  - Amphora labuensis var. fusiformis G.Leuduger-Fortmorel
- Amphora labyrinthica Grunow
- Amphora lacinia A.H.Wachnicka & E.E.Gaiser
- Amphora lacustris R.E.M.Archibald
- Amphora laevis W.Gregory
  - Amphora laevis var. minuta Cleve
  - Amphora laevis var. perminuta (Grunow) Cleve
  - Amphora laevis var. producta Mereschkowski
- Amphora lagerheimii P.Cleve
  - Amphora lagerheimii var. minuta Playfair
- Amphora lanceolata Ehrenberg
  - Amphora lanceolata var. angustissima (Van Heurck) M.Peragallo
  - Amphora lanceolata var. aperta M.Peragallo
  - Amphora lanceolata var. incurvata J.-J.Brun
  - Amphora lanceolata var. minor Cleve
  - Amphora lanceolata var. perlonga Maurice Peragallo
  - Amphora lanceolata var. robusta M.Peragallo
- Amphora lange-bertalotii Levkov & Metzeltin
- Amphora lange-bertalotii var. tenuis Levkov & Metzeltin
- Amphora langebaanae M.H.Giffen
- Amphora latecingulata M.Peragallo
- Amphora leeana S.Mayama & T.Nagumo
- Amphora leighsmithiana O'Meara
- Amphora lepta Schrader
- Amphora leudugeriana Petit
  - Amphora leudugeriana var. intermedia Maurice Peragallo
  - Amphora leudugeriana var. minor Maurice Peragallo
- Amphora levenensis E.Y.Haworth
- Amphora libyca Ehrenberg
  - Amphora libyca f. minor Gutwinski
  - Amphora libyca var. baltica (Brander) Cleve-Euler
  - Amphora libyca var. gigas Ehrenberg
  - Amphora libyca var. interrupta Pantocsek
- Amphora lima Pantocsek
  - Amphora lima var. fossilis Pantocsek
- Amphora limbata Cleve & Grove
- Amphora limpidus C.Janisch
- Amphora lindbergii A.Cleve
- Amphora linearis Meister
  - Amphora lineata f. minor Grunow
  - Amphora lineata var. constricta Grunow
- Amphora lineolata Ehrenberg
- Amphora lineolata Ehrenberg
  - Amphora lineolata f. sparsestriata A.Berg
  - Amphora lineolata var. calamae Frenguelli
  - Amphora lineolata var. chinensis (A.W.F.Schmidt) Cleve
  - Amphora lineolata var. sinensis (A.W.F.Schmidt) Cleve
  - Amphora lineolata var. undata (H.L.Smith) Cleve
- Amphora lingulata K.S.Mereschkowsky
- Amphora liococca Ehrenberg
- Amphora liouvillei M.Peragallo
- Amphora liriope Nagumo
  - Amphora litoralis var. fossilis Pantocsek
- Amphora loczyi Pantocsek
- Amphora longa Hustedt
- Amphora longiceps R.Simonsen
- Amphora lunaris A.Mann
- Amphora lunaris F.Meister
- Amphora lunata Østrup
- Amphora lunatiformis Levkov
- Amphora lunula Cleve
  - Amphora lunula var. parvula H.Heiden
- Amphora lunulata A.H.Wachnicka & E.E.Gaiser
- Amphora lunyacsekii Pantocsek
- Amphora lutea G.Leuduger-Fortmorel
- Amphora luteum A.H.Wachnicka & E.E.Gaiser
  - Amphora lybica f. major Frenguelli
  - Amphora lybica var. cymbiformis Frenguelli
  - Amphora lybica var. vittata A.Cleve
- Amphora lydiae Gusliakov

=== M ===
- Amphora macedoniensis Nagumo
  - Amphora macilenta var. elongata Maurice Peragallo
  - Amphora macilenta var. ergadensis (Gregory) Cleve
  - Amphora macilenta var. macilenta Gregory
  - Amphora macilenta var. maeotica Pr.-Lavrenko
  - Amphora macilenta var. typica Cleve
- Amphora maeandrina Cleve
- Amphora maeotica Pantocsek
- Amphora magellanica P.C.M.Petit
  - Amphora magellanica var. tristani A.Cleve
- Amphora magna Levkov
- Amphora magnifica Grev.
- Amphora maharashtrensis P.T.Sarode & N.D.Kamat
- Amphora makarovae Gusliakov
- Amphora maletracta Simonsen
- Amphora manifesta J.G.Stepanek & Kociolek
- Amphora mansiensis Foged
- Amphora maracaiboensis Levkov
- Amphora marchesettiana Pantocsek
- Amphora margalefii X.Tomàs
  - Amphora margalefii var. lacustris P.Sanchez
- Amphora margaritifera Cleve
- Amphora marginata Østrup
- Amphora maria G.D.Hanna & W.M.Grant
- Amphora marina W.Smith
  - Amphora marina var. minima Cleve-Euler
- Amphora megapora Pantocsek
- Amphora meisteri S.L.VanLandingham
- Amphora membranacea W.Smith
- Amphora memorabilis Pomazkina & E.V.Rodionova
- Amphora meneghiniana Castracane
- Amphora menisca M.H.Hohn & J.Hellerman
- Amphora meridionalis Levkov
- Amphora metzeltinii Levkov
- Amphora mexicana A.W.F.Schmidt
  - Amphora mexicana var. boryana Pantocsek
  - Amphora mexicana var. fusca Cleve
  - Amphora mexicana var. major (Cleve) Cleve-Euler
  - Amphora mexicana var. minor Skvortzov
  - Amphora mexicana var. schmidtiana Van Heurck
- Amphora micans A.W.F.Schmidt
- Amphora michiganensis Stoermer & J.J.Yang
- Amphora micra Levkov
- Amphora micrometra Giffen
- Amphora milesiana Gregory
- Amphora minuscula Frenguelli
- Amphora minuta Pantocsek
  - Amphora minuta var. interrupta M.Hajós
- Amphora minutissima W.Smith
  - Amphora minutissima var. africana Levkov
- Amphora miramaris Frenguelli
- Amphora monglica Oestrup
- Amphora mongolica Østrup
  - Amphora mongolica f. interrupta Skvortzov
  - Amphora mongolica var. cornuta Skvortzow (Skvortsov)
  - Amphora mongolica var. gracilis Skvortzow (Skvortsov)
  - Amphora mongolica var. maculata Skvortzov
- Amphora monilifera Gregory
- Amphora montgomeryi A.H.Wachnicka & E.E.Gaiser
- Amphora mucronata H.L.Smith
- Amphora muelleri A.W.F.Schmidt
- Amphora multigramma M.H.Hohn & J.Hellerman
- Amphora munda A.W.F.Schmidt
- Amphora mutabunda Manguin

=== N ===
- Amphora nagornaya Pomazkina & E.V.Rodionova
- Amphora nagpurensis P.T.Sarode & N.D.Kamat
- Amphora nagumoi Levkov & Pavlov
- Amphora nana W.Gregory
  - Amphora nana f. parva A.W.F.Schmidt
- Amphora natalensis B.J.Cholnoky
- Amphora naumannii C.Janisch
- Amphora naviculacea A.S.Donkin
- Amphora navicularis Ehrenberg
- Amphora naviformis G.Leuduger-Fortmorel
- Amphora neglecta Stoermer & J.J.Yang
  - Amphora neglecta f. densestriata Foged
- Amphora neglectiformis Levkov & Edlund
- Amphora neomarina T.V.Desikachary & P.Prema
- Amphora neupauerii Pantocsek
- Amphora nilotica Ehrenberg
- Amphora nipponica Levkov
- Amphora nobilis Gregory
- Amphora nodosa J.-J.Brun
  - Amphora normani var. gibbosa Skvortzov
  - Amphora normani var. undulata Krasske
  - Amphora novaecaledonica var. hungarica Pantocsek
- Amphora novaeguineae B.J.Cholnoky
- Amphora nuda G.Leuduger-Fortmorel
  - Amphora nuwukiana var. arctica R.M.Patrick & L.R.Freese

=== O ===
- Amphora oamaruensis Schrader
- Amphora obesa Cleve & Grove
- Amphora oblonga Gregory
  - Amphora obscura var. diminuta Krasske
- Amphora obtecta Bailey
- Amphora obtusa W.Gregory
- Amphora obtusaeformis B.J.Cholnoky
- Amphora occidentalis A.Amossé
- Amphora ocellata Donkin
  - Amphora ocellata var. hyalina Skvortzov
  - Amphora ocellata var. interrupta (Pantocsek) Cleve
  - Amphora ocellata var. oamaruensis Cleve
  - Amphora ocellata var. quadrangulata K.S.Mereschkowsky
  - Amphora ocellata var. singulata Cleve
  - Amphora ocellata var. typica Cleve
- Amphora oculus A.W.F.Schmidt
  - Amphora oculus var. farcimen (A.W.F.Schmidt) Cleve
  - Amphora oculus var. fossilis Pantocsek
- Amphora ognjanovae Metzeltin & Levkov
- Amphora ohridana Levkov
- Amphora okawangoi B.J.Cholnoky
- Amphora oncliniorum (Compère) Krammer
- Amphora ornata G.Leuduger-Fortmorel
  - Amphora ornata var. rectangulata (A.Cleve) A.Cleve
- Amphora oscitans Frenguelli
- Amphora ostrearia Brébisson ex Kützing
  - Amphora ostrearia var. beguinotii V.Zanon
  - Amphora ostrearia var. interrupta Pantocsek
  - Amphora ostrearia var. lineata Cleve
  - Amphora ostrearia var. minor Grunow
  - Amphora ostrearia var. porcellus (F.Kitton) Cleve
  - Amphora ostrearia var. quadrata (L.A.Brébisson) G.Rabenhorst
  - Amphora ostrearia var. typica Cleve
  - Amphora ostrearia var. vitrea Cleve
- Amphora ostreata Brébisson
- Amphora ovalis (Kützing) Kützing - type
  - Amphora ovalis f. angusta Ant.Mayer
  - Amphora ovalis f. elliptica G.Rabenhorst
  - Amphora ovalis f. globosa (J.Schumann) Ant.Mayer
  - Amphora ovalis f. maior Istvanfy
  - Amphora ovalis f. major Istvanfy
  - Amphora ovalis f. minor (Grunow) Van Heurck
  - Amphora ovalis f. nana G.Rabenhorst
  - Amphora ovalis f. typica Cleve
  - Amphora ovalis var. baicalensis Skvortzov & K.I.Meyer
  - Amphora ovalis var. elliptica Rabenhorst
  - Amphora ovalis var. elongata A.Jurilj
  - Amphora ovalis var. elongata Østrup
  - Amphora ovalis var. gracilis (Ehrenberg) Van Heurck
  - Amphora ovalis var. hybrida (Grunow) Cleve
  - Amphora ovalis var. lata Levkov
  - Amphora ovalis var. minor H.H.Chase
  - Amphora ovalis var. minor Kützing
  - Amphora ovalis var. minor Rabenhorst
  - Amphora ovalis var. pediculis f. mongolica Skvortzov
  - Amphora ovalis var. perlonga F.Meister
  - Amphora ovalis var. rostrata K.S.Mereschkowsky
  - Amphora ovalis var. tenuis Levkov
  - Amphora ovalis var. typica (Cleve) F.Meister
  - Amphora ovalis var. viridis G.Karst
- Amphora ovum Cleve

=== P ===
- Amphora pagesi A.Lauby
- Amphora pallida Frenguelli
- Amphora pampaninii A.I.Forti
- Amphora pannonica Hajós
- Amphora pannucea M.H.Giffen
- Amphora pantocseki M.Hajós
- Amphora paracopulata Levkov & Edlund
- Amphora paradoxa Ehrenberg
- Amphora parallela J.H.L.Flögel
- Amphora parallelistriata Manguin ex Kociolek & de Reviers
  - Amphora parallelistriata var. manguinii Foged
- Amphora parva E.V.Rodionova & Pomazkina
- Amphora parvula A.I.Proshkina-Lavrenko
- Amphora pauca A.Mann
- Amphora pavillardii Maurice Peragallo
- Amphora pavimentum C.S.Boyer
- Amphora pecten J.-J.Brun
  - Amphora pecten var. argus Cleve
- Amphora pediculus (Kützing) Grunow
  - Amphora pediculus var. distincta A.Cleve
  - Amphora pediculus var. major Van Heurck
  - Amphora pediculus var. minor Grunow
  - Amphora pediculus var. nebulosa A.I.Proshkina-Lavrenko
- Amphora pellucida W.Gregory
- Amphora peraffinis Levkov
- Amphora peragalloi Cleve
- Amphora peragalloi Cleve
  - Amphora peragalloi var. balearica H.Peraragallo & M.Peragallo
- Amphora peragallorum Van Heurck
  - Amphora peragallorum var. minor Maurice Peragallo
  - Amphora peragallorum var. parvula H.Heiden
  - Amphora peragallorum var. robusta H.F.Van Heurck
- Amphora perstriata H.Peragallo & M.Peragallo
- Amphora pestilenta M.H.Giffen
- Amphora pesudoeximiformis E.V.Rodionova & Pomazkina
- Amphora petermannii M.Peragallo
- Amphora petiti J.A.Tempère & J.-J.Brun
- Amphora petitii Leuduger-Fortmorel
- Amphora philippinica F.S.Castracane degli Antelminelli
- Amphora pimenteli M.Peragallo
- Amphora piper B.J.Cholnoky
- Amphora platensis Frenguelli
- Amphora plativalvata Nagumo
- Amphora pleurosigma J.A.Tempère & J.-J.Brun
- Amphora plicata W.Gregory
- Amphora pogrebnjakovii Gusliakov
- Amphora polaris Østrup
- Amphora polita Krasske
- Amphora polonica Zelazna-Wieczorek & Lange-Bertalot
- Amphora polycocca K.S.Mereschkowsky
- Amphora polyzonata F.S.Castracane degli Antelminelli
- Amphora pontica K.S.Mereschkowsky
- Amphora porcellus F.Kitton
- Amphora praelata Hendey
- Amphora praevalida Janisch
- Amphora prespanensis Levkov, Krstic & Metzeltin
- Amphora prisca Cleve & Grove
- Amphora prismatica Cleve
- Amphora proboscidea W.Gregory
- Amphora profusa M.H.Giffen
- Amphora proschkiniana Gusliakov
- Amphora proteoides Hustedt
  - Amphora proteoides f. varians Pr.-Lavrenko
- Amphora proteus (Grunow) Zanon
- Amphora proteus W.Gregory
  - Amphora proteus f. ambigua Pr.-Lavrenko
  - Amphora proteus f. lacunata A.Jurilj
  - Amphora proteus var. alata Cleve
  - Amphora proteus var. baikalensis Skvortzow (Skvortsov)
  - Amphora proteus var. contigua Cleve
  - Amphora proteus var. impressa Cleve-Euler
  - Amphora proteus var. kariana (A.Grunow) Grunow
  - Amphora proteus var. kariana Grunow
  - Amphora proteus var. laevistriata Cleve-Euler
  - Amphora proteus var. maxima H.Peragallo
  - Amphora proteus var. mexicana (A.W.F.Schmidt) Cleve
  - Amphora proteus var. minor Grunow
  - Amphora proteus var. nodosa A.Jurilj
  - Amphora proteus var. oculata H.Peragallo & M.Peragallo
  - Amphora proteus var. oculata f. nana Bodeanu
  - Amphora proteus var. robusta Skvortzov
  - Amphora proteus var. tenuissima Cleve-Euler
- Amphora protracta Pantocsek
  - Amphora protracta var. gallica Héribaud-Joseph
- Amphora prudentii Héribaud-Joseph
- Amphora pseudaequalis Levkov
- Amphora pseudoeximia Levkov
- Amphora pseudoeximiformis E.V.Rodionova & Pomazkina
- Amphora pseudoholsatica T.Nagumo & H.Kobayasi
- Amphora pseudohyalina Simonsen
- Amphora pseudomicra Pomazkina & E.V.Rodionova
- Amphora pseudominutissima Levkov
- Amphora pseudoproteus A.H.Wachnicka & E.E.Gaiser
- Amphora pseudosibirica Levkov & Pavlov
- Amphora pseudospectabilis Levkov
- Amphora pseudotenuissima A.H.Wachnicka & E.E.Gaiser
- Amphora puechi A.Lauby
- Amphora pulchella H.Perag.& M.Perag.
- Amphora punctata G.W.Andrews
- Amphora punctata Schrader
- Amphora pura Levkov
- Amphora pusilla Gregory
- Amphora pusio Cleve
  - Amphora pusio var. parvula (Flögel) H.Peragallo & M.Peragallo

=== Q ===
- Amphora quadrangulata K.S.Mereschkowsky
- Amphora quadrata Brébisson ex Kützing
- Amphora quadrata Gregory

=== R ===
- Amphora racovitzae van Heurck
- Amphora ramsbottomi M.M.Salah
- Amphora ranomafanensis Manguin
- Amphora recens Levkov & Nakov
- Amphora recessa A.Mann
- Amphora recondita Levkov & Nakov
- Amphora recta (Gregory) Grunow
- Amphora recta Leuduger-Fortmorel
- Amphora rectangularis W.Gregory
- Amphora rectilineata Cleve & Grove
- Amphora recurva F.Meister
- Amphora reinholdii G.D.Hanna
- Amphora reniformis M.R.Sreenivasa & H.C.Duthie
- Amphora reniformis Y.-Q.Guo, S.-Q.Xie & J.-S.Li
- Amphora revirescens Pantocsek
  - Amphora rhombica var. gracilior Cleve
  - Amphora rhombica var. sinica Skvortzow
- Amphora richardiana B.J.Cholnoky
- Amphora rimosa Ehrenberg
- Amphora rimosa hyalina Ehrenberg
- Amphora robertsonii A.C.Podzorski
- Amphora robusta W.Gregory
  - Amphora robusta var. brevistriata A.Cleve
  - Amphora robusta var. fusca Cleve
  - Amphora robusta var. hemicostata H.Peragallo
  - Amphora robusta var. minor H.J.B.Juhlin-Dannfelt
  - Amphora robusta var. subplicata Cleve
- Amphora roettgeri J.J.Lee & C.W.Reimer
- Amphora rossii Hajós
- Amphora rostrigera Frenguelli
- Amphora rotunda Skvortzov (Skvortsow)
- Amphora russica Pantocsek

=== S ===
- Amphora sabyii Salah
  - Amphora salina var. capitata M.Peragallo
  - Amphora salina var. capitata R.dÕAubert
  - Amphora salina var. fossilis Pantocsek
- Amphora salsa Patrick & Freese
- Amphora samoensis M.Peragallo
- Amphora sanctenectairense Rochoux d'Aubert
- Amphora sancti-martiali M.Peragallo
- Amphora sancti-martiali var. faureli A.Amossé
- Amphora sancti-naumii Levkov & Metzeltin
- Amphora sarniensis Grev.
  - Amphora sarniensis var. flexuosa (Grev.) Cleve
- Amphora scala Cleve & Grove
  - Amphora scala var. alata Cleve
- Amphora scalaris F.S.Castracane degli Antelminelli
- Amphora scardica Levkov
- Amphora schleinitzii C.Janisch
- Amphora schmidtii Grunow
  - Amphora schmidtii f. major Cleve
  - Amphora schmidtii f. minor Cleve
  - Amphora schmidtii var. alata Cleve
  - Amphora schmidtii var. minor H.Peragallo
  - Amphora schmidtii var. schleinitzii (C.Janisch) Cleve
- Amphora scopulorum M.H.Giffen
- Amphora sculpta Frenguelli
- Amphora scutella A.H.Wachnicka & E.E.Gaiser
- Amphora sejuncta Pantocsek
- Amphora semen Ehrenberg
- Amphora semi-ovum Leuduger-Fortmorel
- Amphora seminuda F.Meister
- Amphora semperpalorum A.H.Wachnicka & E.E.Gaiser
- Amphora sendaiana J.-J.Brun
- Amphora senonquei M.Peragallo
- Amphora separanda H.Peragallo & M.Peragallo
- Amphora septentrionalis Østrup
- Amphora serrata Skabichevskii (Skabitschevsky)
- Amphora serrataeformis Levkov
- Amphora sibirica Skvortzow & K.I.Meyer
- Amphora sima A.Mann
- Amphora similis Levkov
- Amphora simplex G.Leuduger-Fortmorel
- Amphora sinuata Grev.
- Amphora skvortzowii Levkov
- Amphora soelsvigiensis P.C.M.Petit
- Amphora somalica Frenguelli
- Amphora soninkhishigiae Edlund, Shinneman & Levkov
- Amphora spartinetensis Sullivan & C.W.Reimer
- Amphora spectabilis W.Gregory
- Amphora splendida P.Rivera
- Amphora spriggerica A.H.Wachnicka & E.E.Gaiser
- Amphora staubii Pantocsek
- Amphora staurohyalina A.C.Podzorski & H.Håkansson
- Amphora staurophora Castracane
- Amphora staurophora Pantocsek
- Amphora stechlinensis Levkov & Metzeltin
- Amphora stoermeri Edlund & Levkov
- Amphora strangulata G.Leuduger-Fortmorel
- Amphora streckerae Krammer
- Amphora striata K.E.Eichwald
- Amphora striata M.Hajós
- Amphora strigata Pantocsek
- Amphora studeri C.Janisch
- Amphora sturtii Grunow
- Amphora suavis Pantocsek
- Amphora subacutiuscula Schoeman
- Amphora subaequalis Levkov
- Amphora subatomus Levkov
- Amphora subconstricta Levkov
- Amphora subcostulata Stoermer & J.J.Yang
- Amphora subelliptica K.S.Mereschkowsky
- Amphora subhyalina A.C.Podzorski & H.Håkansson
- Amphora subinflata Grunow ex A.W.F.Schmidt
- Amphora sublaevis Hustedt
  - Amphora submontana var. ebroicensis R.Maillard
- Amphora subovalis Renault ex Lauby
- Amphora subpunctata Grove & G.Sturt
- Amphora subrobusta Hustedt
  - Amphora subrobusta var. pliocenica Frenguelli
- Amphora subrotunda Levkov
- Amphora subtilissima R.Simonsen
- Amphora subtropica A.H.Wachnicka & E.E.Gaiser
- Amphora subturbida Levkov
- Amphora subulata M.Peragallo
- Amphora sulcata A.W.F.Schmidt
  - Amphora sulcata f. parva A.W.F.Schmidt
- Amphora sumatrensis G.Leuduger-Fortmorel
- Amphora szaboi Pantocsek

=== T ===
- Amphora tanganyikae Caljon
- Amphora tasmanica W.Vyverman, Sabbe, R.Vyverman, Hodgon & Muylaert
- Amphora tegetum A.H.Wachnicka & E.E.Gaiser
- Amphora tenarescens Cholnoky
- Amphora tenellula M.H.Giffen
- Amphora tenerascens B.J.Cholnoky
- Amphora tenuis J.H.L.Flögel
- Amphora tenuissima Hustedt
- Amphora tenuissima M.H.Giffen
- Amphora tenuistriata Manguin
  - Amphora terroris var. limbata Cleve
  - Amphora terroris var. rara (Frenguelli) S.L.VanLandingham
- Amphora tertiaria Pantocsek
- Amphora tessellata Grove & G.Sturt
- Amphora testudinata M.H.Hohn & J.Hellerman
- Amphora teta G.Karst
- Amphora tetragibba Cleve
- Amphora thaitiana F.S.Castracane degli Antelminelli
- Amphora thromboliticola Cocquyt
- Amphora tibestiensis Amosse
- Amphora timida Hustedt
- Amphora tithoniana Pantocsek
- Amphora tomassiniana Pantocsek
- Amphora tomiakae Witkowski, Lange-Bertalot & Metzeltin
- Amphora topaschevskii Gusliakov
- Amphora torontoensis M.R.Sreenivasa & H.C.Duthie
- Amphora tortonica M.Hajós
- Amphora towutensis Hustedt
- Amphora transcaspica (J.B.Petersen) A.Dulmaa
- Amphora transfixa F.Meister
- Amphora transsylvanica A.Jurilj
- Amphora transylvanica Pantocsek
- Amphora trasilvancia Pantocsek
- Amphora treubii G.Leuduger-Fortmorel
- Amphora triseriata M.Ricard
- Amphora tropidoneioides M.M.Salah
- Amphora truncata Cleve
- Amphora truncata W.Gregory
  - Amphora truncata var. brevis Bodeanu
- Amphora tumidula Grunow
- Amphora tumulifer A.Mann
- Amphora turbida Levkov
  - Amphora turbida var. neothaumae Levkov
  - Amphora turgida f. minor M.Peragallo
  - Amphora turgida var. ceylonica Skvortzov
  - Amphora turgida var. parallela H.Heiden
- Amphora twenteana Krammer

=== U ===
- Amphora uncinatum (Ehrenberg) Edwards
- Amphora undata G.Leuduger-Fortmorel
- Amphora undata H.L.Smith
- Amphora undulata Grev.

=== V ===
- Amphora vadosinii A.H.Wachnicka & E.E.Gaiser
- Amphora valida H.Peragallo
- Amphora variabilis T.F.Kozyrenko
- Amphora vaughanii M.H.Giffen
  - Amphora veneta f. globulosa Foged
  - Amphora veneta var. angularis Stoermer
  - Amphora veneta var. gibbosa Frenguelli
  - Amphora veneta var. grossestriata Playfair
  - Amphora veneta var. indica Skvortzov
  - Amphora veneta var. minor Frenguelli
  - Amphora veneta var. veneta Kützing
- Amphora veneziana K.S.Mereschkowsky
- Amphora venusta Østrup
- Amphora verrucosa Pantocsek
- Amphora vetula Levkov
  - Amphora vetula f. perforata E.V.Rodionova & Pomazkina
  - Amphora vetula f. simila Pomazkina & E.V.Rodionova
  - Amphora vetula var. baikalensis Levkov
- Amphora vetusta Cleve
- Amphora virgata Østrup
  - Amphora virgata var. crassa M.Peragallo
- Amphora vitra Cleve
- Amphora vitrea Cleve
- Amphora vittata Pantocsek
- Amphora vixvisibilis Chunlian Li & Witkowski
- Amphora vulgaris Ehrenberg

=== W ===
- Amphora wachenhusenii C.Janisch
- Amphora waldeniana J.G.Stepanek & Kociolek
- Amphora wandelensis P.C.M.Petit
- Amphora weinekii C.Janisch
- Amphora weissflogii A.W.F.Schmidt
- Amphora wiesnerii Pantocsek
- Amphora wittsteinii C.Janisch

=== Z ===
- Amphora zebrata J.A.Tempère & J.-J.Brun
- Amphora zebrina A.W.F.Schmidt
- Amphora zeta G.Karst
