= Amphora (disambiguation) =

Amphora may refer to:

- Amphora, a type of ceramic vase with two handles, used for the transportation and storage of perishable goods
- Amphora (unit), a unit for measuring liquids or bulk goods in the Roman Empire
- Amphora, the at sign (@), also called asperand and ampersat
- Amphora (alga), a major genus of diatoms
- Amphora, a model of semi-closed-circuit mixture rebreather made by Aqua Lung America
- AMPHORA, a bioinformatics software for metagenomics analysis
- Amphora, a brand of pipe tobacco produced by Mac Baren

== See also ==
- Anfora, the largest Mexican manufacturer of vitrified ceramics
- Anthora, a coffee cup design popular in New York City which depicts an amphora
