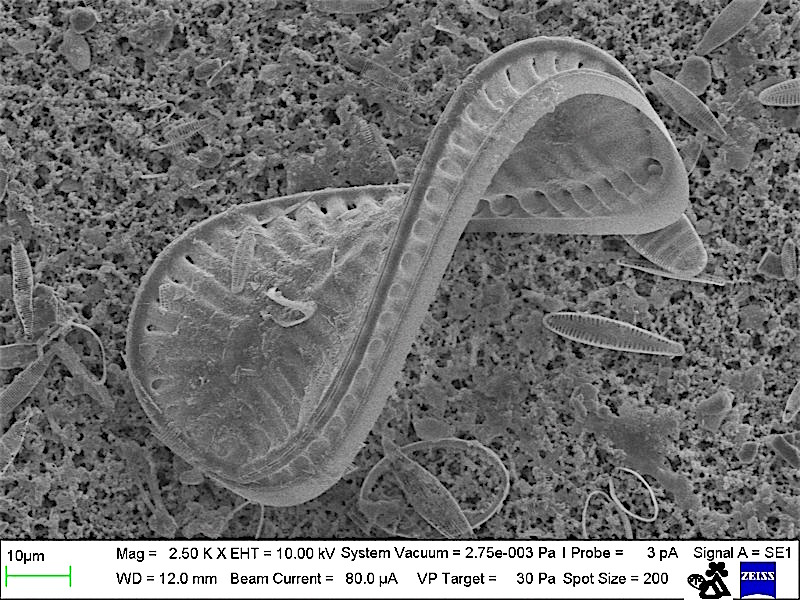
- Surirella spiralis

Scientific classification
- Domain: Eukaryota
- Clade: Diaphoretickes
- Clade: SAR
- Clade: Stramenopiles
- Phylum: Gyrista
- Subphylum: Ochrophytina
- Class: Bacillariophyceae
- Order: Surirellales
- Family: Surirellaceae
- Genus: Surirella; Turpin, 1828,

Species
- about 325 (WoRMS lists 871), including: Surirella arctica; Surirella elegans; Surirella parahelvetica; Surirella subrotunda

= Surirella =

Genus of single-celled organisms

Surirella is a genus of diatoms in the family Surirellaceae.

The genus was circumscribed by Pierre Jean François Turpin in Mem. Mus. Hist. Nat. vol.16 on page 361 in 1828.

The genus name of Surirella is in honour of Jacques Simon Armand Suriray (1769–1846), who was a French doctor, naturalist and botanist (Algology), Zoologist, who worked in Le Havre.
