= Iconella elegans =

Scientific classification
- Domain: Eukaryota
- Clade: Sar
- Clade: Stramenopiles
- Division: Ochrophyta
- Clade: Bacillariophyta
- Class: Bacillariophyceae
- Order: Surirellales
- Family: Surirellaceae
- Genus: Iconella
- Species: I. elegans

Binomial name
- Iconella elegans (Ehrenb.) Bukhtiyarova

Species of single-celled organism

Iconella elegans is a species of freshwater diatoms in the family Surirellaceae.
