= Campylodiscus elegans =

Scientific classification
- Domain: Eukaryota
- Clade: Sar
- Clade: Stramenopiles
- Division: Ochrophyta
- Clade: Bacillariophyta
- Class: Bacillariophyceae
- Order: Surirellales
- Family: Surirellaceae
- Genus: Campylodiscus
- Species: C. elegans

Binomial name
- Campylodiscus elegans (Ehrenberg) Ralfs

Synonyms
- Surirella elegans Ehrenberg

Species of single-celled organism

Campylodiscus elegans is a species of diatoms in the family Surirellaceae.
