= Amphora elegans =

Scientific classification
- Domain: Eukaryota
- Clade: Sar
- Clade: Stramenopiles
- Division: Ochrophyta
- Clade: Bacillariophyta
- Class: Bacillariophyceae
- Order: Surirellales
- Family: Surirellaceae
- Genus: Amphora
- Species: A. elegans

Binomial name
- Amphora elegans H.Perag ex Cleve, 1893

Species of single-celled organism

Amphora elegans is a species of diatoms found in Europe.
