= Cladogramma =

Cladogramma Temporal range: 84.9–3.6 Ma

Scientific classification
- Domain: Eukaryota
- Clade: Diaphoretickes
- Clade: Sar
- Clade: Stramenopiles
- Phylum: Gyrista
- Subphylum: Ochrophytina
- Class: Bacillariophyceae
- Order: incertae sedis
- Genus: †Cladogramma; Ehrenberg, 1854

Species
- Several, including: †Cladogramma dubium Lohman; †Cladogramma elegans (Castracane, 1886) Kuntze, 1898; †Cladogramma ellipticum Lohman

Extinct genus of single-celled organisms

Cladogramma is an extinct genus of prehistoric marine diatoms with uncertain affinity. Species are known from the Pliocene of Japan, Miocene of the United States (North Carolina), Cretaceous and Paleocene of Antarctica.
