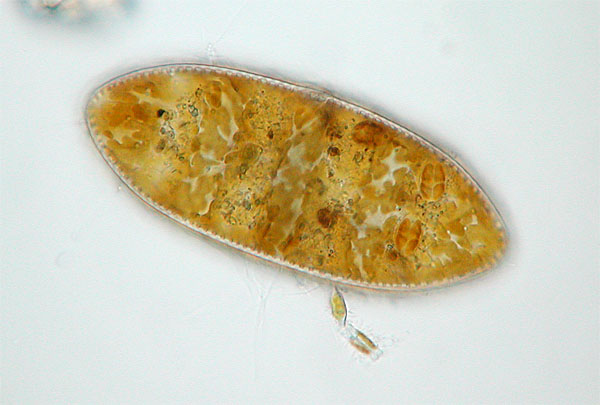
- Cymatopleura elliptica

Scientific classification
- Domain: Eukaryota
- Clade: Diaphoretickes
- Clade: SAR
- Clade: Stramenopiles
- Phylum: Gyrista
- Subphylum: Ochrophytina
- Class: Bacillariophyceae
- Order: Surirellales
- Family: Surirellaceae
- Genus: Cymatopleura; W.Smith, 1851

= Cymatopleura =

Genus of algae

Cymatopleura is a genus of diatoms belonging to the family Surirellaceae.

Species:

- Cymatopleura acutiformis Z.Levkov & T.Nakov
- Cymatopleura albaregiensis (Pantocsek) A.Cleve
- Cymatopleura angulata Greville
