= Castracane =

Castracane may refer to:

- Alessandro Castracani (or Alessandro Castracane, 1580–1649), a Roman Catholic prelate who served as Bishop of Fano
- Castruccio Castracane degli Antelminelli (1779–1852), an Italian cardinal
- Francesco Castracane degli Antelminelli (1817–1899), an Italian naturalist
