= Brébisson =

Brébisson or Brebisson is a surname. Notable people with the surname include:

- Cyrille de Brébisson, French programmer
- Louis Alphonse de Brébisson (1798–1888), French botanist and photographer
