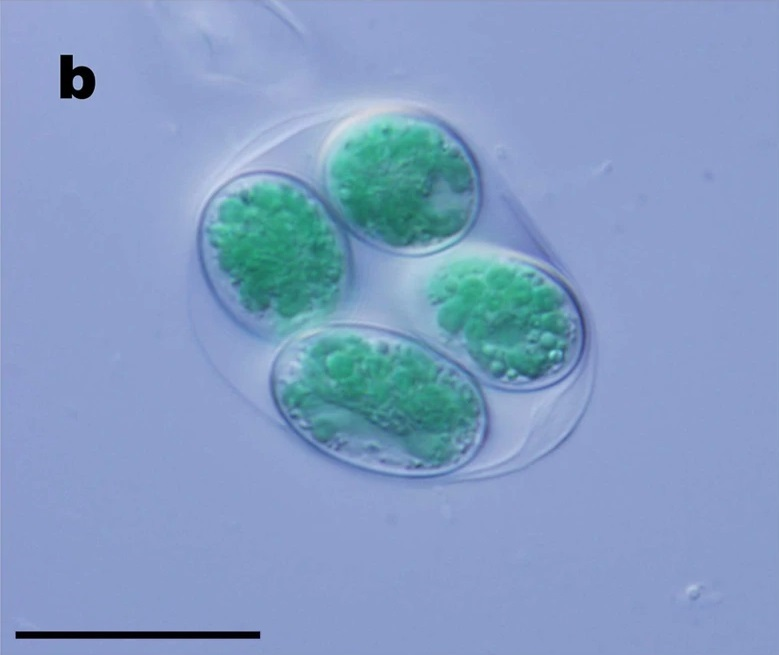

Scientific classification
- Domain: Eukaryota
- Clade: Archaeplastida
- Division: Glaucophyta
- Class: Glaucophyceae
- Order: Glaucocystales
- Family: Glaucocystaceae
- Genus: Glaucocystis
- Species: G. nostochinearum

Binomial name
- Glaucocystis nostochinearum Itzigsohn, 1866

Synonyms
- Glaucocystis geitleri Pringsheim, 1964

= Glaucocystis nostochinearum =

Species of alga

Glaucocystis nostochinearum is a species of glaucophyte in the family Glaucocystaceae. The species is the type species of its genus, Glaucocystis. The species can be found in the waters of Northern Europe, North America and Oceania.

== Description ==
Glaucocystis nostochinearum consists of ellipsoidal colonies up to 40–60 μm. Each colony has typically four to eight (occasionally fewer or up to 16) cells enclosed in a persistent parental cell wall. Cells are ellipsoid, and reproduce by four (rarely two) autospores; larger colonies may have multiple groups of cells each bounded by their own parental cell wall.

The species has one form and one variety:

- Glaucocystis nostochinearum f. immanis Schmidle, 1902
- Glaucocystis nostochinearum var. moebii Gutwinski, 1901

A second variety, Glaucocystis nostochinearum var. incrassata is now accepted as its own species, Glaucocystis incrassata.
