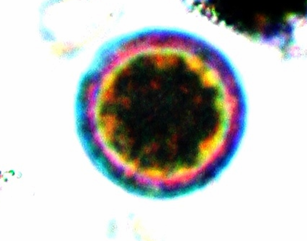
- Unidentified Campylodiscus

Scientific classification
- Domain: Eukaryota
- Clade: Diaphoretickes
- Clade: SAR
- Clade: Stramenopiles
- Phylum: Gyrista
- Subphylum: Ochrophytina
- Class: Bacillariophyceae
- Order: Surirellales
- Family: Surirellaceae
- Genus: Campylodiscus; Ehrenberg ex Kützing, 1844

Species
- Many, including: Campylodiscus clypeus (Ehrenberg) Ehrenberg ex Kützing (type); Campylodiscus elegans (Ehrenberg) Ralfs

= Campylodiscus =

Genus of single-celled organisms

Campylodiscus is a genus of diatoms in the family Surirellaceae.
