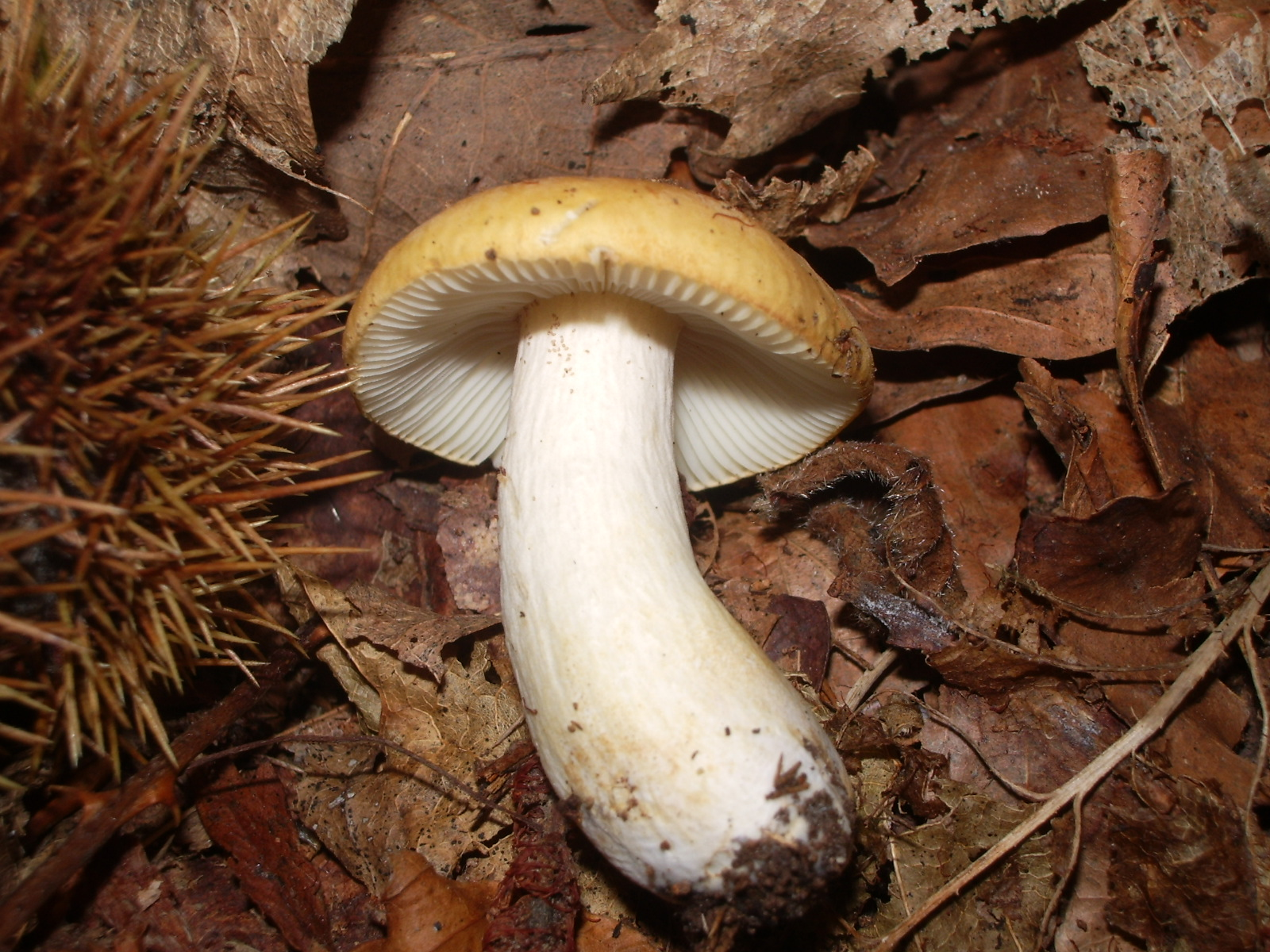

Scientific classification
- Kingdom: Fungi
- Division: Basidiomycota
- Class: Agaricomycetes
- Order: Russulales
- Family: Russulaceae
- Genus: Russula
- Species: R. ochroleuca

Binomial name
- Russula ochroleuca Fr. (1838)

Synonyms
- Agaricus ochroleucaus Pers. (1801)

= Russula ochroleuca =

Species of fungus

Russula ochroleuca
- Mycological characteristics
- Gills on hymenium
- Cap is convex
- Hymenium is free or adnexed
- Stipe is bare
- Spore print is white
- Ecology is mycorrhizal
- Edibility is edible, but unpalatable

Russula ochroleuca is a member of the genus Russula. A group that have become known as brittlegills. It has been commonly known as the common yellow russula for some years, and latterly the ochre brittlegill. It is widespread, and common in mixed woodland.

== Taxonomy ==
Russula ochroleuca was first noted and named as a species of Agaricus by the pioneering South African mycologist Christian Hendrik Persoon in 1801.

== Description ==
The cap is dull yellow and 5–12 cm (2–4.5 in) wide, initially convex, later flat, or slightly depressed. The cap margin becomes furrowed when mature, and it is two-thirds peeling. The gills are white to greyish white, and are adnexed. The stipe is 3–7 cm (1–3 in) long, 1–2 cm (0.5–1 in) wide, cylindrical, white or later greyish. The taste is mild to moderately hot.

It could be confused with the similar-looking and much better tasting Russula claroflava.

== Distribution and habitat ==
Russula ochroleuca grows in deciduous and coniferous forest, where it (at least in Northwestern Europe) is very common. In the USA it is fairly common under conifers; birch, and aspen in the Northern States.

== See also ==
- List of Russula species
