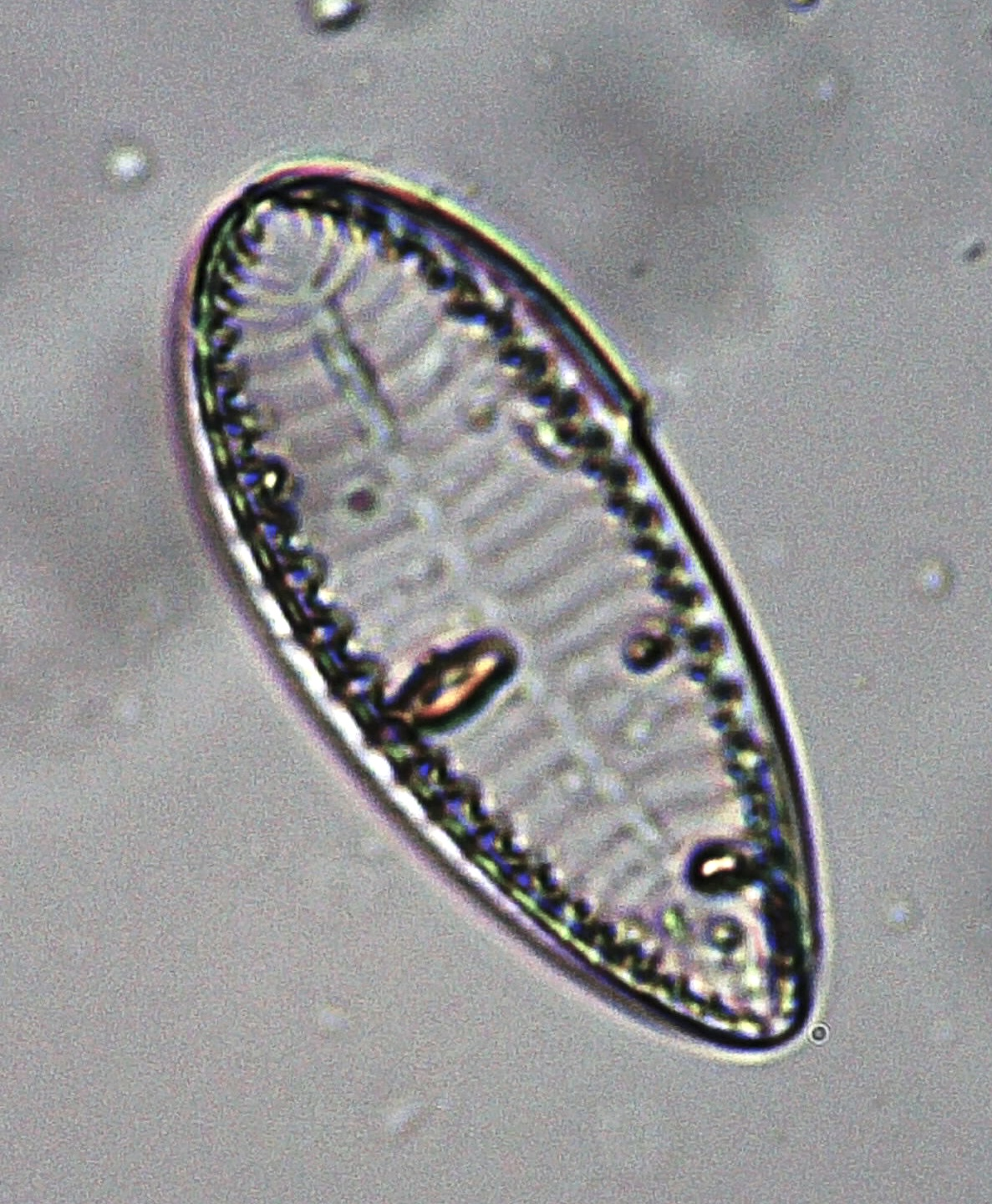

Scientific classification
- Domain: Eukaryota
- Clade: Diaphoretickes
- Clade: SAR
- Clade: Stramenopiles
- Phylum: Gyrista
- Subphylum: Ochrophytina
- Class: Bacillariophyceae
- Order: Surirellales
- Family: Surirellaceae
- Genus: Iconella; A.Jurilj, 1949

Species
- Many, including: Iconella aculeata (Hustedt) Cocquyt & R.Jahn; Iconella acuminata (Hustedt) Cocquyt & R.Jahn

= Iconella (alga) =

Genus of single-celled organisms

Iconella is a genus of diatoms in the family Surirellaceae.
