= Arthur Scott Donkin =

British physician and writer (1828–1883)

- Born: 6 July 1828; Northumberland
- Died: 3 September 1883; Low Dinsdale
- Occupation(s): Physician, writer

Arthur Scott Donkin (6 July 1828 – 3 September 1883) was a British physician and writer known for his research on diabetes. Donkin proposed a skimmed milk treatment for Bright's disease and diabetes.

== Biography ==
Donkin was born to Samuel Donkin (1801–1888) and Sarah Scott. Donkin was lecturer in Medical Jurisprudence and Toxicology at the University of Durham. He was also a lecturer on Forensic Medicine and Examiner in Medicine. Donkin was a member of the Clinical Society of London. His son was John George Donkin (1853–1890).

Donkin did not originate the use of skimmed milk to treat diabetes but was a notable proponent of using it exclusively to treat his patients. He also used it to treat Bright's disease. Whilst a physician to the Sunderland Infirmary he reported that his diabetic patients had a "complete and permanent recovery" in 15 days on a diet of skim-milk. Donkin reported his results in a series of papers in The Lancet journal. However, his results were not confirmed by other researchers.

Donkin's skim-milk treatment for diabetic patients consisted of a cup of skim-milk every two or three hour on the first day: on the second day the quantity was doubled at the same intervals: on the third day half a pint was given at intervals of three or four hours: on the fourth day four pints were given and after that six, seven or more pints could be given. All food was forbidden on the diet. The treatment was criticized as extreme and other medical authorities found the treatment unfavourable. William Howship Dickinson and Sir William Roberts advised against the diet as it caused exhaustion and was unsafe as it had killed some patients. In 1872, his book The Skim-Milk Treatment of Diabetes and Bright's Disease was negatively reviewed in the Edinburgh Medical Journal. The reviewer noted that Donkin only recorded the results of seven cases of diabetes and in none of these was the patient restored to a good state of health to return to an ordinary mixed diet. Three of the cases were fatal and one gave up on the treatment.

A 12-page review of Donkin's On the Relation Between Diabetes and Food was published in The Glasgow Journal, in 1876.

== Selected publications ==
- The Natural History of the British Diatomaceae (1870)
- The Skim-Milk Treatment of Diabetes and Bright's Disease (1871)
- Further Observations on the Skim-Milk Treatment of Diabetes Mellitus (1873)
- On the Relation Between Diabetes and Food and Its Application to the Treatment of the Disease (1875)
