= George Karsten =

German botanist

George Karsten (3 November 1863 – 7 May 1937) was a German botanist born in Rostock.

In 1885 he earned his doctorate from the University of Strasbourg, and in 1892 received his habilitation in botany at the University of Leipzig. Later on, he served as an associate professor at the Universities of Kiel (1898) and Bonn (from 1899). In 1909 he became a professor at the University of Halle and was appointed director of the botanical garden.

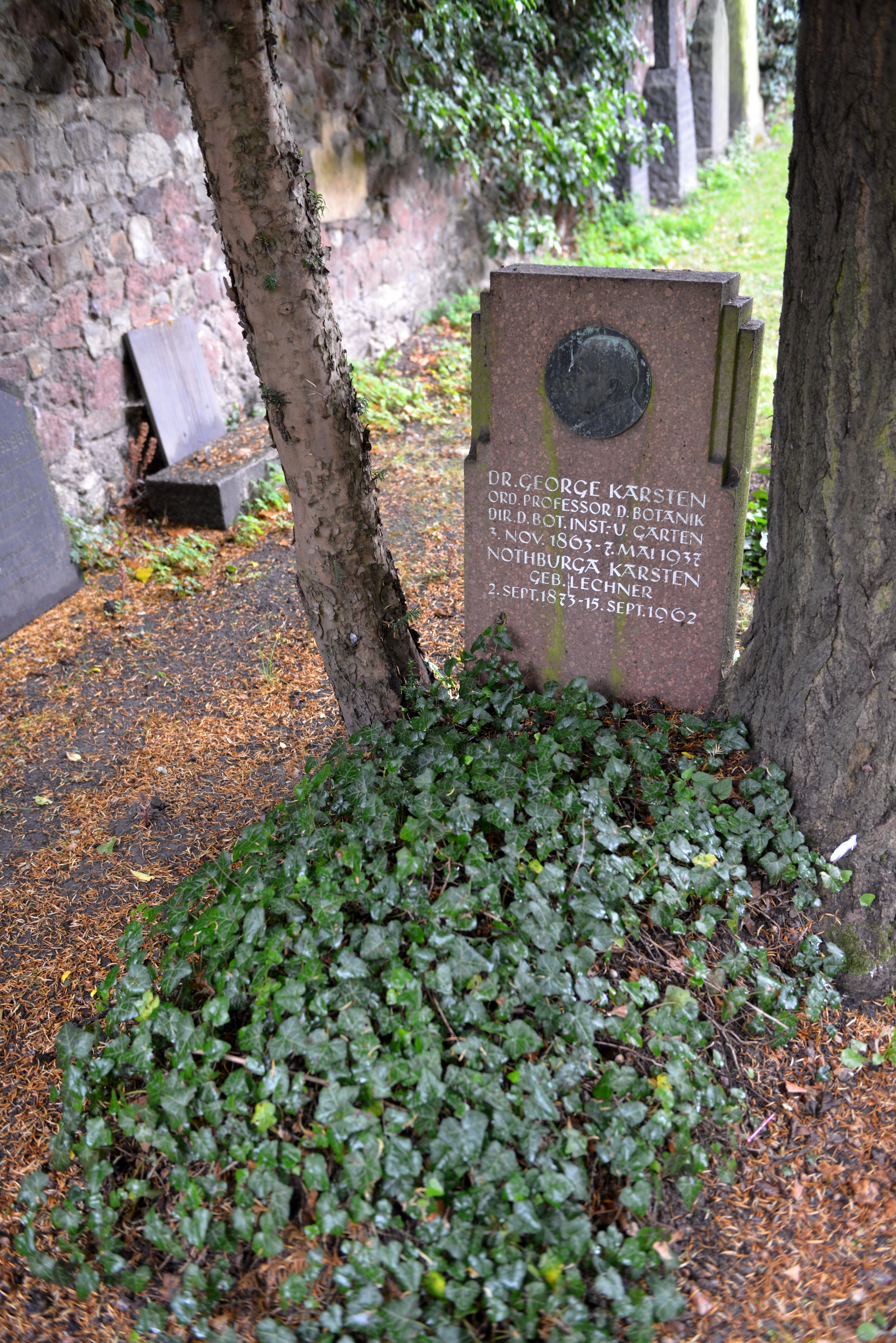
Grave of George Karsten at the Laurentius-Friedhof in Halle (Saale)

With Heinrich Schenck (1860–1927), he was editor of a popular journal of botany called Vegetationsbilder. Karsten is remembered for his studies of phytoplankton, and among his written works are publications on phytoplankton collected from the deep-sea Valdivia Expedition of 1898–99:

- Lehrbuch der Pharmakognosie des Pflanzenreiches für Hochschulen und zum Selbstunterricht mit Rücksicht auf das neue deutsche Arzneibuch (1903) Digital edition by the University and State Library Düsseldorf
- Das Phytoplankton des Antarktischen Meeres nach dem Material der deutschen Tiefsee-Expedition 1898-1899 (Phytoplankton of the Antarctic Seas from the German Deep-sea Valdivia Expedition); (1905).
- Das Phytoplankton des Atlantischen Ozeans nach dem Material der deutschen Tiefsee-Expedition 1898-1899 (Phytoplankton of the Atlantic Ocean from the German Deep-sea Valdivia Expedition); (1906).
- Das Indische Phytoplankton nach dem Material der Deutschen Tiefsee-Expedition 1898-1899 (Phytoplankton of the Indian Ocean from the German Deep-sea Valdivia Expedition); (1907).
