= Steven Selva =

Steve Selva
- Steve Selva
- Born: 1948 (age 77–78); California, United States
- Education: California State Polytechnic University, Humboldt (1967–1972); Iowa State University (1972–1976)
- Scientific career
- Fields: Lichenology
- Workplaces: University of Maine at Fort Kent

Steven B. Selva (born 1948) is Professor Emeritus of Biology and Environmental Studies at the University of Maine at Fort Kent, a lichenologist, and curator of UMFK's lichen herbarium. Selva is an expert on stubble lichens, called so because their millimeter-high stalks resemble beard stubble.

== Academic career ==
Selva attended Humboldt State University in Arcata, California, earning bachelor's degrees in biology and botany. He continued his education at Iowa State University in Ames where he earned his PhD in botany. His dissertation focused on establishing biostratigraphic units based on freshwater diatoms preserved in the soil of the Ogallala Aquifer. During the course of his research, Selva discovered seven new species of diatoms.

In 1976, Selva began his teaching career at the University of Maine at Fort Kent where he teaches courses in environmental studies, dendrology, general botany, plant taxonomy, plant physiology, and lichenology. In 1983, Selva spent seven months in Ottawa studying the lichens of Aroostook County, Maine (where UMFK is located) with Irwin Murray Brodo.

Though the University of Maine at Fort Kent does not require research as a condition of employment, Selva actively pursues many ongoing lichen research programs, receiving grants from organizations such as the Appalachian Mountain Club, The Nature Conservancy, the New Brunswick Museum, the National Geographic Society, and the Northeastern Forest Experiment Station. The focus of his lichenological research centers on the use of stubble lichens as environmental indicators, both in reference to the age of a forest and its level of pollution. Selva retired in 2013 and was elected Professor Emeritus by the UMFK faculty following his retirement. He continues to work with the lichen herbarium on the UMFK campus.

== Lichen herbarium ==
Housed in Cyr Hall of the University of Maine at Fort Kent's campus, Selva's lichen herbarium is one of the largest in the world. It contains around 60,000 specimens of multiple varieties of lichens, including the largest collection of stubble lichens in North America as well as the largest collection of old growth forest lichens in the northeastern United States.

Beginning in 2001, Selva and colleague/former student Ray Albert began uploading the contents of the lichen herbarium online at the University of Maine at Fort Kent's Lichen Research Program. The database contains specific information on the collection location, habitat information, and the substrate or base on which the lichens were found. Eventually Selva and Albert hope to include microscope images of each specimen along with the latitude and longitude of where they were collected.

== Fellowships, honors, and memberships ==
Selva holds the following fellowships, honors, and memberships:

- Florence M. Christie Research Fellowship sponsored by the New Brunswick Museum, Saint John, New Brunswick (1989)
- Outstanding Contribution to Faculty Excellence Award, presented by the University of Maine at Fort Kent faculty senate (1990)
- Current memberships in the American Bryological and Lichenological Society, the British Lichen Society, the International Association for Lichenology, the Josselyn Botanical Society, and The Nature Conservancy.

== Research reports ==
Selva has published the following lichenological reports:

- "Lichens as indicators of old growth forests." Prepared for the Maine Chapter of The Nature Conservancy, Topsham, Maine. (1986, 1988, 1989)
- "The Caliciales of Mount Carleton Provincial Park, New Brunswick." Prepared for the New Brunswick Museum, Saint John. (1990)
- "Lichen diversity and stand continuity in the northern hardwoods and spruce-fir forests of Vermont and New Hampshire." Prepared for the National Geographic Society and The Northeastern Forest Experiment Station.(1993, 1994, 1995)
- "Using lichens in the Order Caliciales to Assess Stand continuity in the Forests of Maritime Canada." Prepared for The Northeastern Forest Experiment Station, Durham, New Hampshire. (1996)
- "The Caliciales of Nova Scotia and Prince Edward Island." Prepared for the National Geographic Society, Washington, D.C. (1998)
- "Survey of epiphytic lichens of late successional northern hardwoods forests in northern Cape Breton Island." Prepared for Cape Breton Highlands National Park and Parks Canada, Ingonish Beach, Nova Scotia. (1999)
- "Using lichens in the Order Caliciales to assess ecological continuity in the forests of Baxter State Park, Maine." Prepared for the Sweet Water Trust, Boston, Massachusetts. (1999)
- "Using lichens in the Order Caliciales to assess stand continuity at Borestone Mountain Wildlife Sanctuary." Prepared for Borestone Mountain Wildlife Sanctuary, Dover-Foxcroft, Maine. (1999)
- "Using lichens to assess stand continuity at the Stoddard northern hardwoods forest preserve in southern New Hampshire and six steep-slope red spruce forests in northern Maine." Prepared for the Sweet Water Trust, Boston, Massachusetts. (2000)
- "COSEWIC status report on Sclerophora peronella Tibell ("frosted glass-whiskers")." Prepared for the Committee on the Status of Endangered Wildlife in Canada, Canadian Wildlife Service, Environment Canada, Ottawa, Ontario. (2001)
- "COSEWIC status report on Phaeocalicium minutissimum (Merrill) Selva ("red oak stubble")." Prepared for the Committee on the Status of Endangered Wildlife in Canada. Canadian Wildlife Service, Environment Canada, Ottawa, Ontario. (2001)
- "COSEWIC status report on Chaenotheca servitii Nadv. ("flexuous golden stubble")." Prepared for the Committee on the Status of Endangered Wildlife in Canada. Canadian Wildlife Service, Environment Canada, Ottawa, Ontario. (2001)
- "Survey of the epiphytic lichens of mature boreal forests in northern Cape Breton." Prepared for Cape Breton Highlands National Park and Parks Canada, Ingonish Beach, Nova Scotia. (2001)

== Species ==
Species published by Selva include Chaenothecopsis edbergii, Phaeocalicium matthewsianum, Sphinctrina benmargana, and Stenocybe flexuosa.
