= Szemes =

Szemes is a Hungarian surname. Notable people with the surname include:

- Gergő Szemes (born 2003), Hungarian fencer
- Mari Szemes (1932–1988), Hungarian actress
- Mihály Szemes (1920–1977), Hungarian film director
