= Anfora =

Mexican manufacturer of ceramics

Anfora is the largest Mexican manufacturer of vitrified ceramics. It is based in the silver mining city of Pachuca, in the state of Hidalgo, in Mexico.

== History ==
Anfora was founded in 1920 by Pablo Schmidt, Alberto Lenz, Julio Vermehren, Carlos Reichert, Enrique Hilger, Federico Ritter and Adolfo Goerz in Mexico City as a porcelain manufacturer for home and institutional ceramic dinnerware. It was originally called Fábrica de Loza El Ánfora. After the Mexican Revolution, Anfora grew its production through German technology and Mexican labor, eventually coming to dominate the Mexican market for this type of products. In 1932, Anfora started to manufacture sanitaryware for the construction market. During World War II, the Mexican government under Lázaro Cárdenas intervened the company as the original owners were of German nationality. After a tumultuous period of poor decisions and lack of investment by government officials, the company was sold in 1947 to local investors. The period of explosive post-war growth, plus its installed infrastructure, allowed Anfora to grow exponentially and become a household name. In 1994, the factory moved to a 1,200,000 square feet (110,000 m^{2}) facility in Pachuca, where it continues to operate with over 1,000 people in 2020.

== Markets ==
The company sells in Mexico through a network of distributors and wholesalers. In the US, it is represented exclusively by Steelite for the foodservice market, where it competes against local factories like Homer Laughlin and Hall China. Home use dinnerware is sold through retailers like Pottery Barn and Williams Sonoma. One of the most traditional Anfora patterns is the hand painted Blue and White Puebla, sold as a collector's dinnerware through individuals on eBay. Other customers include Starbucks and Mexican restaurants like Sanborns, Las Mañanitas and San Angel Inn.

In Japan, Anfora is represented by The Harvest Kitchen Store as well as by Royal Bussan. European markets are served through Steelite UK, while Latin America has its share of local importers.
