= Henri van Heurck =

Belgian botanist (1838–1909)

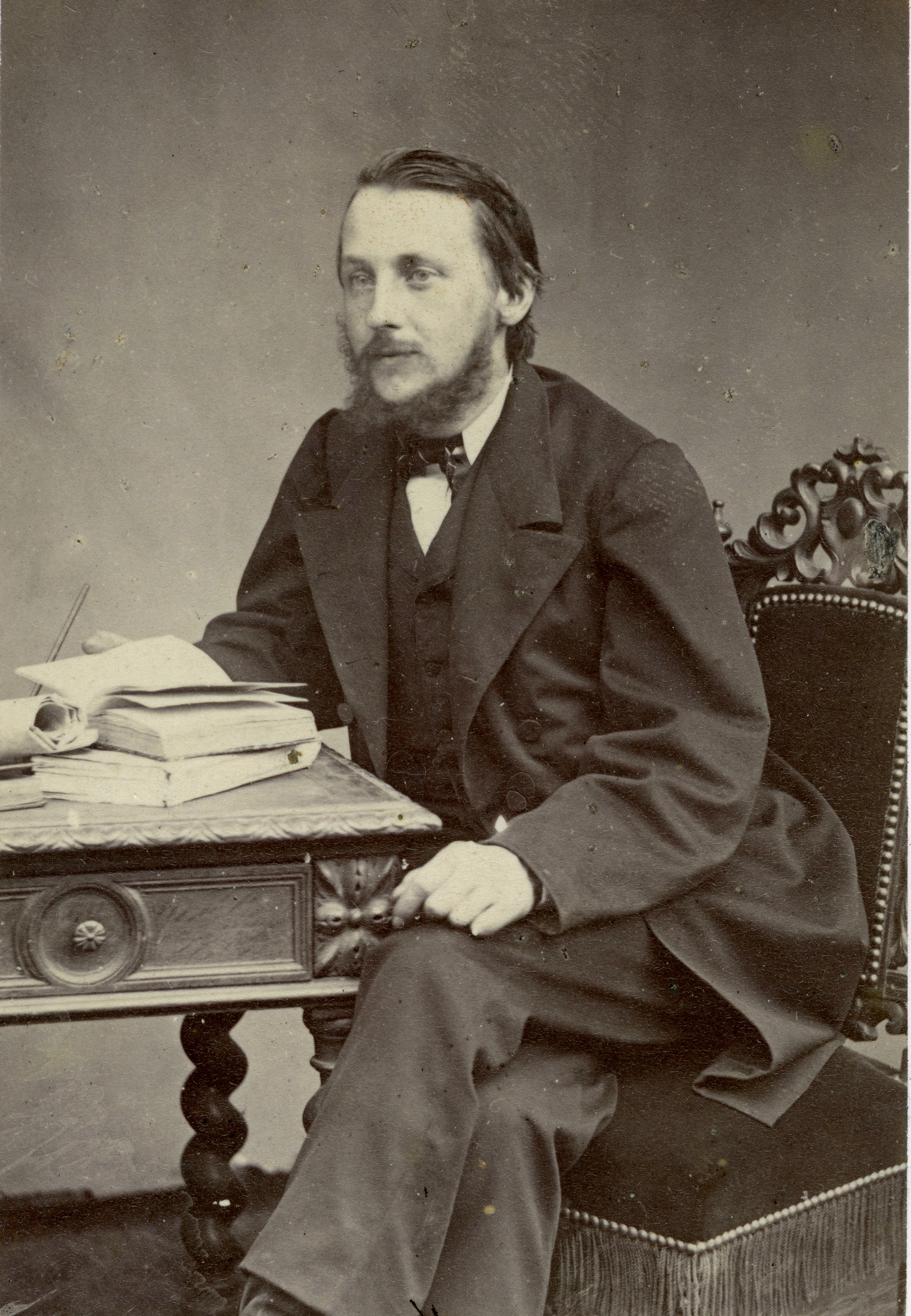

Henri Ferdinand van Heurck (28 August 1838 – 13 March 1909) was a Belgian diatom specialist and microscopist. Born in an industrialist family, he taught himself microscopy and botany and wrote several pioneering works on diatoms, their study under the microscope and their preservation. He pioneered the use of electric lighting and its use in microphotography.

== Life and work ==
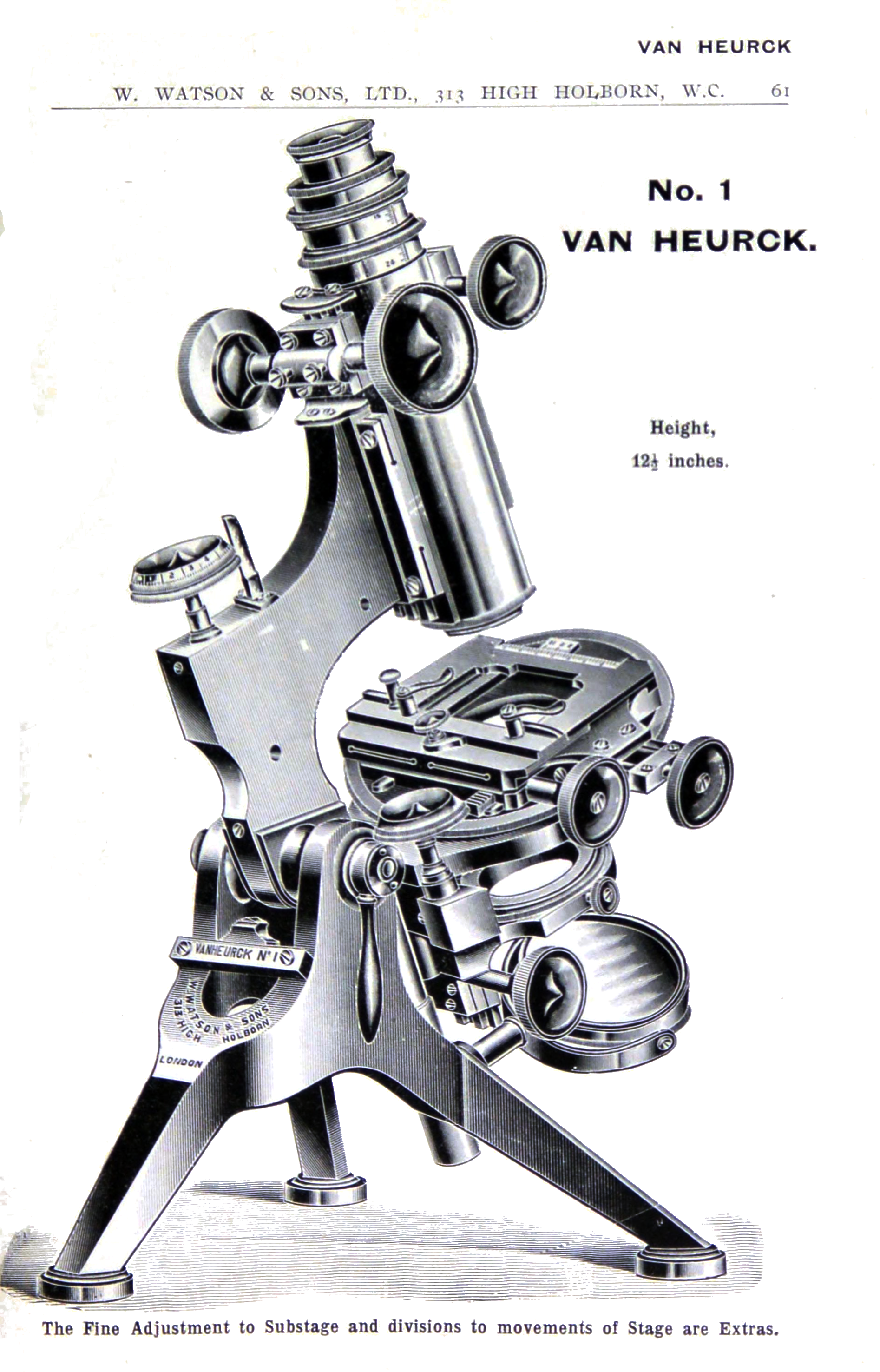
A Van Heurck model of microscope

Van Heurck was born in Antwerp to Ferdinand Van Heurck and Marie-Elisabeth Balus. The family owned a paint a varnish factory in the Gezondstraat which was founded in 1787 and known as “De krasfabriek” (The Chalk Factory). Van Heurck went to the Jesuit school in Aalst and continued at the Royal Athenaeum. He spent some time at the Sint-Ignatius Institute in Leuven where he was influenced by Father Vincent Gautier to study diatoms. Financially well off, he spent his time studying diatoms under the microscope, teaching himself biology. He had an X-ray machine set up at home and collected herbal medicines from around the world. He collaborated with the plant breeder and seed producer J.I. De Beucker (1827-1906) and they founded the Antwerp herbalist society. In 1861 he published a flora of Brabant and then went to Bonn to study under professor Hermann Schacht. In 1862 he was co-founder of the Royal Society of Botany in Belgium. Van Heurck married the botanist Jeanne Collignon (1841-1922) in 1863 against the family wishes as she came from a less wealthy background. Between 1866 and 1870 he cooperated with Arthur Martinis and edited the exsiccata Herbier des plantes rares ou critiques de Belgique. From 1867 he taught chemistry at the Antwerp Nijverheidsschool. From 1877 he became director and professor at the Antwerp Botanic Garden. He published two diatom books between 1880 and 1900 - “Synopsis des diatomées de Belgique” (1880–1885) and “Traité des diatomées” (1896) which brought him acclaim. In 1881, his home was among the first to have electric lighting. He also helped develop microscopy and wrote “Le microscope” (1865) which went into several editions (a 4th in 1891) and he helped promote some design innovations in microscope manufacturing. He made use of electric lighting for his microscope set up and produced photographs of specimens. He collected diatoms by making trips on his flat-bottom yacht, the Nautilus. Together with Albert Grunow van Heurck published the exsiccata series Types du synopsis de Diatomees de Belgique par le Dr. Henri Van Heurck. Déterminations, notes et diagnoses par M. A. Grunow (1882-1885). His work contributed to a popularization of the study of diatoms and led to an interest in the documentation of the diatoms of the North Sea. This was achieved under the editorship of W. E. Baxter in 1896 with the publication of The Treatise on the Diatomaceae.

Van Heurck was made an honorary fellow of the Royal Microscopical Society in 1883. He received an honorary doctorate from the University of Rostock in 1869. He collected diatom specimens, herbal medicines, rare books, antique microscopes, and also a herbarium which was donated to the city of Antwerp and is held at the botanic garden. In 1934, the city of Antwerp changed the name of the street where he lived from "Gezondstraat" to "Henri Van Heurckstraat".
