= Béla Jenő Cholnoky =

Hungarian diatomologist and phycologist (1899–1972)

- Born: 27 June 1899; Budapest, Kingdom of Hungary
- Died: 5 February 1972; Pretoria, South Africa
- Known for: Freshwater diatom ecology; African diatom taxonomy; diatom collections and reference material
- Scientific career
- Fields: Phycology; Diatom research; Hydrobiology; Botany
- Institutions: University of Pretoria; National Institute for Water Research (South Africa); N. V. Sluis en Groot (Enkhuizen)
- Author abbrev. (botany): Cholnoky

Béla Jenő Cholnoky (27 June 1899 – 5 February 1972) was a Hungarian hydrobiologist, botanist and phycologist (algologist) best known for his research on diatoms (microscopic algae with silica cell walls), particularly in southern Africa. After moving to South Africa in the early 1950s, he became a leading figure in regional diatom studies and was described by colleagues as a major authority on freshwater diatom ecology and taxonomy.

== Early life and education ==
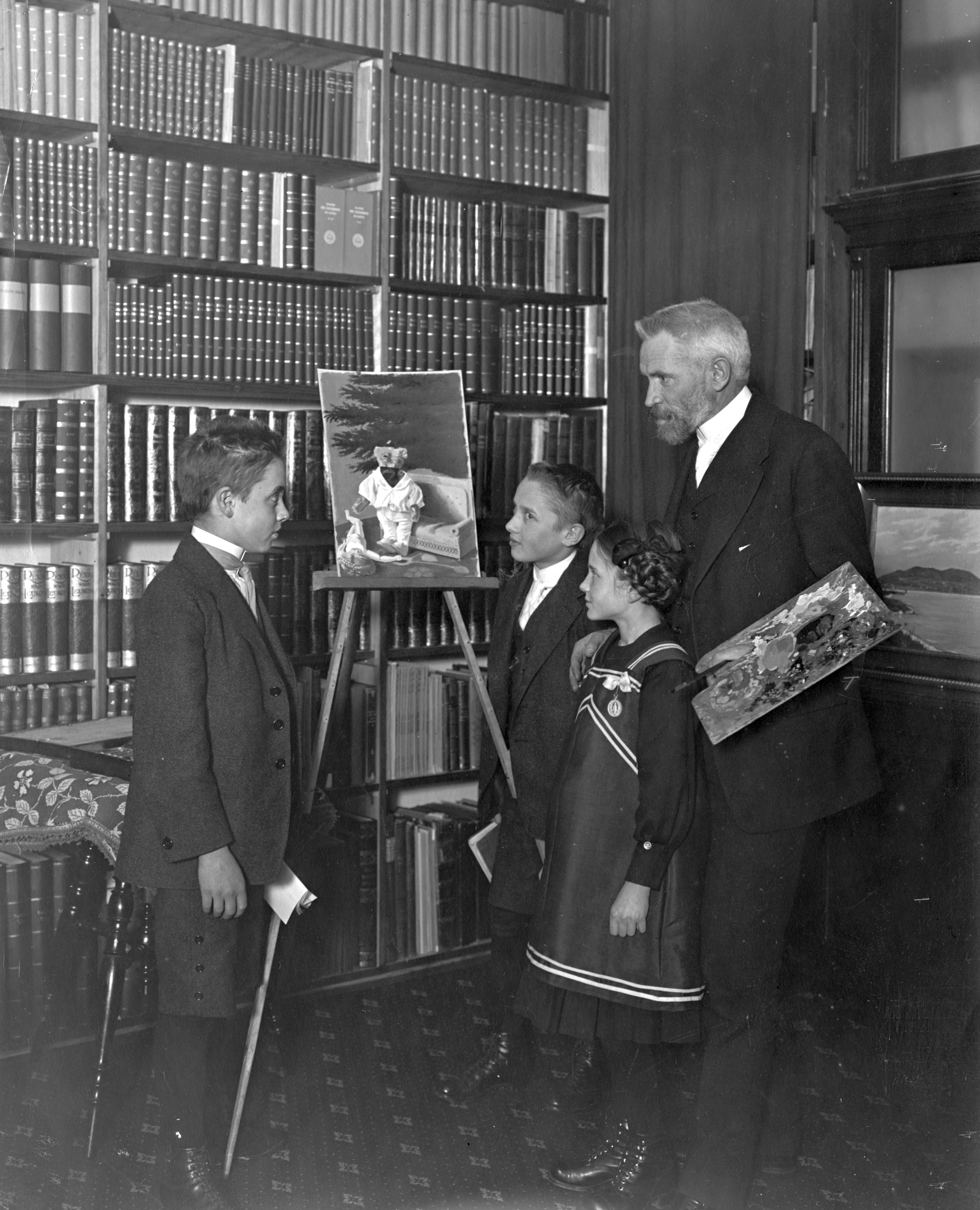
Béla Cholnoky (left) with siblings Tibor and Ilona, and father Jenő Cholnoky (photographed in 1913)

Cholnoky was born in Budapest and spent part of his school years in Kolozsvár (now Cluj-Napoca). He studied biology at the Franz Joseph University in Kolozsvár (later relocated to Szeged) and later at the University of Szeged, focusing on the biological sciences, and completed doctoral work with high academic distinction (summa cum laude). According to an obituary by the South African diatomist R. E. M. Archibald, Cholnoky later continued postgraduate study in Berlin (1924–1925) under E. Bauer and R. Kolkwitz and earned an additional doctorate, again with the highest honours.

Cholnoky was the son of the Hungarian geographer Jenő Cholnoky (1870–1950).

== Career ==
=== Early posts and work outside academia ===
While still a student, Cholnoky worked at the botanical institute of the Franz Joseph University, beginning a career that combined laboratory work with field-based freshwater research. Cholnoky resigned from his early academic post in the mid-1920s for political reasons.

For much of the interwar period he was employed in the seed trade, first in Hungary and later in the Netherlands with the firm N. V. Sluis en Groot. During these years he maintained an intense private research programme on diatoms, assembling his own laboratory facilities and building a specialist library. This personal library was later expropriated by the Hungarian state.

=== Second World War and return to the Netherlands ===
At the end of the Second World War Cholnoky left Hungary as Soviet forces advanced westwards. Archibald wrote that, with the assistance of the Austrian botanist Karl Höfler, he reached Vienna and later re-established himself professionally in western Europe. By 1946 he had returned to Sluis en Groot as a scientific adviser.

=== Move to South Africa ===
In 1952 Cholnoky emigrated to South Africa and joined the University of Pretoria, initially as a lecturer (later described as a senior academic appointment). After several years teaching, he moved into a research post at the National Institute for Water Research, where he was able to devote most of his time to diatom studies and related hydrobiological work.

== Research and scientific contributions ==
=== Diatom ecology and taxonomy ===
Cholnoky's research centred on diatoms in inland waters, combining taxonomy (the description and naming of species) with ecological interpretation of communities in rivers, lakes, wetlands and springs. A later survey of his material noted that, from his Pretoria period onward, he studied diatoms across the African continent, describing numerous new taxa and paying particular attention to ecological patterns in freshwater habitats.

Archibald's obituary emphasised the geographic breadth of Cholnoky's African work, reporting that his investigations covered most of South Africa and extended into present-day Namibia, Botswana, Zimbabwe and Mozambique.

=== Major works ===
Cholnoky published extensively over several decades; the bibliography printed with Archibald's obituary lists more than 100 items, ranging from early studies of diatom communities in central Europe to later monographs based on African material. Archibald described his book Die Ökologie der Diatomeen in Binnengewässern (1968) as a long-lasting reference work for freshwater diatom ecology.

At the time of his death, Cholnoky was working on a large-scale systematic monograph on African diatoms. Archibald wrote that the project remained unfinished, in part because of Cholnoky's demanding standards of documentation and accuracy.

=== Collections and reference material ===
Cholnoky created large slide and sample series from African field material, often preparing multiple duplicate slides from each sample and distributing sets internationally. Wendker noted that aspects of this practice later complicated typification (the identification of reference specimens for names), because Cholnoky generally did not mark type specimens on his slides and frequently cited only sample numbers in published descriptions.

Parts of his diatom collection are held in several institutions. Wendker documented material in the algological collections of the Berlin Botanical Garden and Botanical Museum and noted that the largest portion of the collection was held in Pretoria at the National Institute for Water Research. South African technical guidance on diatom monitoring has described the country's "long and proud history of diatom research" as being strongly shaped by Cholnoky's work and refers to him as a pioneer in the field.

== Legacy ==
Archibald portrayed Cholnoky as a demanding scholar who held firm scientific opinions and could be sharply critical of colleagues' work, while also being willing to help students and collaborators who showed serious commitment to diatom research. The obituary described him as highly disciplined in his routine, frequently working long hours and travelling mainly to obtain additional diatom material.

In Archibald's assessment, Cholnoky transformed a previously neglected area of study in South Africa, leaving behind extensive publications and reference material that supported subsequent work in taxonomy and freshwater monitoring. Archibald suggested that he could be regarded as "the father of South African diatomology". Later South African training and methods documents have likewise identified his work as foundational to the country's diatom research tradition.

== Selected publications ==
- Cholnoky, B.J. (1960). "Beiträge zur Kenntnis der Diatomeenflora von Natal (Südafrika)" [Contributions to the knowledge of the diatom flora of Natal (South Africa)]. Nova Hedwigia (in German). 2: 1–128.
- Cholnoky, B.J. (1966). "Die Diatomeen im Unterlaufe des Okavango-Flusses" [The diatoms in the lower course of the Okavango River]. Beihefte zur Nova Hedwigia (in German). 21: 1–102.
- Cholnoky, B.J. (1968). "Die Diatomeenassoziationen der Santa-Lucia-Lagune in Natal (Südafrika)" [The diatom assemblages of the Santa Lucia Lagoon in Natal (South Africa)]. Botanica Marina (Supplement) (in German). 11: 1–121.
- Cholnoky, B.J. (1968). Die Ökologie der Diatomeen in Binnengewässern [The ecology of diatoms in inland waters] (in German). Lehre: J. Cramer.
