= Stoermer =

Stoermer is a surname. Notable people with the surname include:

- Curt Stoermer (1891–1976), German painter
- Eugene F. Stoermer (1934–2012), American biologist
- Grace Stoermer (1887–1961), American civic leader, banking executive, and politician
- Mark Stoermer (born 1977), American musician
- Zendaya Stoermer Coleman, better known as Zendaya (born 1996), American actress, dancer, and singer
