= William Bywater Grove =

Botanist and mycologist (1848–1938)

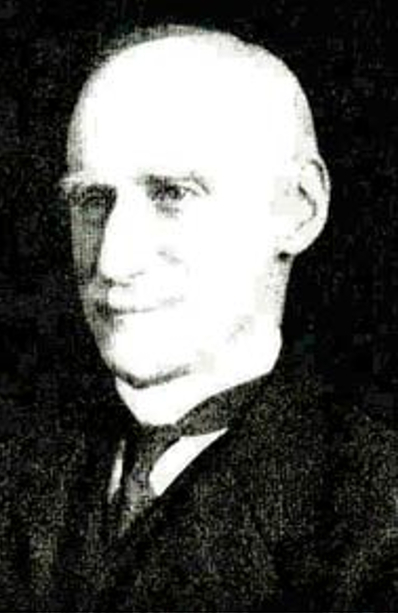
William Bywater Grove

William Bywater Grove (24 October 1848 – 6 January 1938), was an English biologist, in particular a botanist and microbiologist. He is remembered in particular as a mycologist. He died on 6 January 1938, when he was 89.

== Early life and teaching career ==
He was born in Birmingham, England, the son of George Grove. He was admitted as a pensioner to St Catharine's College, Cambridge, where he graduated with a BA in 1871. From 1887 to 1900 he was headmaster of St Edmunds High School for Boys, Birmingham. One of the pupils at that school during that period was Augustus Daniel Imms, a prominent entomologist. From 1905 to 1927 Grove lectured in botany at Birmingham Municipal Technical School.

== Research work and publications ==
Grove was the Honorary Curator of the Fungus Herbarium at the University of Birmingham.

He received the Midland Union of Natural History Societies's Darwin Medal in 1884, for "a monograph on the Pilobolidæ and other botanical papers", published in their journal, The Midland Naturalist.

Grove's publications include:

- 1884. On the Pilobolidæ, With a Synopsis of the European Species, and a Description of a New One. The Midland Naturalist 7:131-135,149-153,184-187,214-220,253-260,280-284,304-309,333-339 and plates VI & VI.
- 1884. A Synopsis of the Bacteria and Yeast Fungi and Allied Species (Schizomycetes and Saccharomycetes).
- 1886. The Fungi, in Handbook of Birmingham prepared for the members of the British Association, pp. 339
- 1888. A description of a new species of mushroom, Russula claroflava.
- 1891. (With James Eustace Bagnall) "Fungi", in The Flora of Warwickshire.
- 1910. The Mycetozoa (in the series The Fauna of the Midland Plateau).
- 1913. The British Rust Fungi (Uredinales) : their Biology and Classification.
- 1915. A Pocket Synopsis of the Families of British Flowering Plants (based upon the system of Engler).
- 1935–1937. British Stem- and Leaf-Fungi (Coelomycetes), in 2 volumes.
- He translated the mycological treatise of Louis Rene and Charles Tulasne, Selecta Fungorum Carpologia into English.

== See also ==
- List of mycologists
