= Albert Grunow =

Albert Grunow (3 November 1826, Berlin – 17 March 1914, Berndorf, Lower Austria) was a German-Austrian chemist and phycologist. He specialized in the study of diatoms.

From 1851 he worked as a chemist in a metal works factory in Berndorf. In 1857-59 he participated in the Austrian "Novara Expedition", and was tasked with analysis of its algal collections. Also, he served as a collector, preparator and determiner of specimens towards the development of Gottlob Ludwig Rabenhorst's diatom exsiccatae. Grunow himself co-edited two exsiccata series, one of them under the title Algae Ceylanicae, legit W. Ferguson, determ. A. Grunow with William Ferguson, the other under the title Types du synopsis de Diatomees de Belgique par le Dr. Henri Van Heurck. Déterminations, notes et diagnoses par M. A. Grunow with Henri van Heurck.

In 1901 he donated his collection of extant and fossil diatoms to the Natural History Museum of Vienna. He was a corresponding member of the Geologischen Reichsanstalt.

== Selected works ==
- Diatomaceen, Familie Navuculaceen, 1860 - Diatomaceae, family Naviculaceae.
- Ueber neue oder ungenügend gekannte Algen, 1860 - On new or largely unknown algae.
- Die Österreichischen Diatomaceen, etc. 1862 - Diatomaceae of Austria.
- Reise seiner Majestät Fregatte Novara um die Erde : Botanischer Theil. I Band, Algen, 1867 - Journey of the frigate Novara and its circumnavigation of the Earth.
- "New diatoms from Honduras"; published in English (1877).
- Beiträge zur Kenntniss der fossilen Diatomeen Österreich-Ungarns, 1882 - Contribution to the understanding of fossil diatoms of Austria-Hungary.
- Die Diatomeen von Franz Josefs-Land, 1884 - Diatoms from Franz Josef Land.
- "Additamenta ad cognitionem Sargassorum", 1913.
