= Roman Gutwinski =

Phycologist

Roman Gutwinski (alternative spelling: Roman Gutwiński, 1860–1932) was a phycologist. He worked at least some of his life in the Austro-Hungarian Empire.

== Works ==
- Prodromus florae algarum galiciensis. 1895
- De algis a Dre M. Raciborski anno 1899 in insula Java collectis. 1902
- Flora algarum montiium Tatrensium... 1909
