= Louis Alphonse de Brébisson =

French photographer and botanist

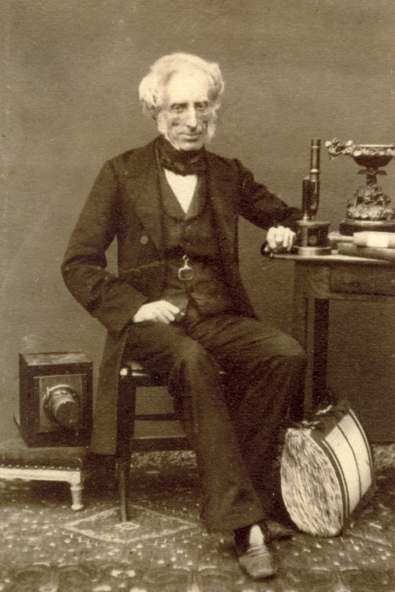
- Born: September 28, 1798; Falaise
- Died: April 26, 1888 (aged 89)
- Scientific career
- Fields: Botany

Louis Alphonse de Brébisson (25 September 1798 – 26 April 1888) was a French botanist and photographer born in Falaise, Calvados.

In his youth, he was interested in mineralogy and entomology, but his focus soon turned to botany. He is renowned for "Flore de la Normandie", a work on vegetation native to Normandy that was published over multiple editions. He was the author of several papers on Diatomaceae and Desmidiales, and was possibly the only French scientist researching these algae groups at the time. He also conducted extensive investigations of mosses and orchids.

With Christiaan Hendrik Persoon, Benjamin Gaillon, Jean Baptiste Boisduval and Jean-Louis-Auguste Loiseleur-Deslongchamps, he made contributions to the multi-volume "Flore générale de France, ou Iconographie, description et histoire de toutes les plantes phanérogames, cryptogames et agames qui croissent dans ce royaume, disposées suivant les familles naturelles" (1828–29). Brébisson edited the exsiccata series Mousses de la Normandie, recueillies et publiées par L. Alphonse de Brébisson, membre de plusieurs sociétés savantes (1826–39).

He was a member of the Société linnéenne de Normandie and a founding member of the Société française de photographie.
