= Francesco Castracane degli Antelminelli =

Italian naturalist

Francesco Castracane degli Antelminelli (19 July 1817 in Fano, Italy – 27 March 1899 in Rome) was an Italian naturalist.

== Biography ==
Francesco Castracane degli Antelminelli was educated at the Jesuits' school in Reggio Emilia, and was ordained priest in 1840. Four years later he was made canon of the cathedral in Fano, and at the same time resumed his studies at the Collegio dei Nobili in Rome. In 1852 he resigned his canonry, and took up his residence in Rome. Castracane had a love of nature, and during the latter half of his life devoted himself to biological research. He was reportedly one of the first to introduce photomicrography into the study of biology. His first experiments in applying the camera to the microscope were made as early as 1862 with diatomaceæ, and he subsequently made these microorganisms his chief study. He investigated their structure and physiological functions and, particularly in his last years, their processes of reproduction, also on account of its bearing on some of the problems of biology, geology, and even hydrography.

The extensive collections of diatomaceæ obtained by the Challenger expedition were entrusted to him for description and classification. He discovered among them three new genera, two hundred and twenty-five new species, and some thirty new varieties. He was the author of a large number of papers, published chiefly in the proceedings of the Accademia dei Nuovi Lincei, over whose meetings he presided for many years.

== See also ==
- List of Catholic clergy scientists
