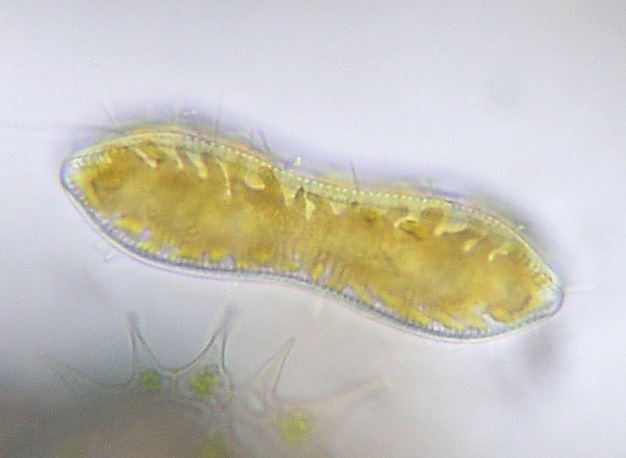
- Surirella librile

Scientific classification
- Domain: Eukaryota
- Clade: Sar
- Clade: Stramenopiles
- Phylum: Ochrophyta
- Clade: Diatomeae
- Class: Bacillariophyceae
- Order: Surirellales
- Family: Surirellaceae; Kützing, 1844

Genera
- Campylodiscus; Cymatopleura; Hydrosilicon; Iconella; Petrodictyon; Plagiodiscus; Stenopterobia; Surirella

= Surirellaceae =

Family of single-celled organisms

Surirellaceae is a family of diatoms in the order Surirellales.

== Genera ==
- Campylodiscus
- Cymatopleura
- Hydrosilicon
- Iconella
- Petrodictyon
- Plagiodiscus
- Stenopterobia
- Surirella
