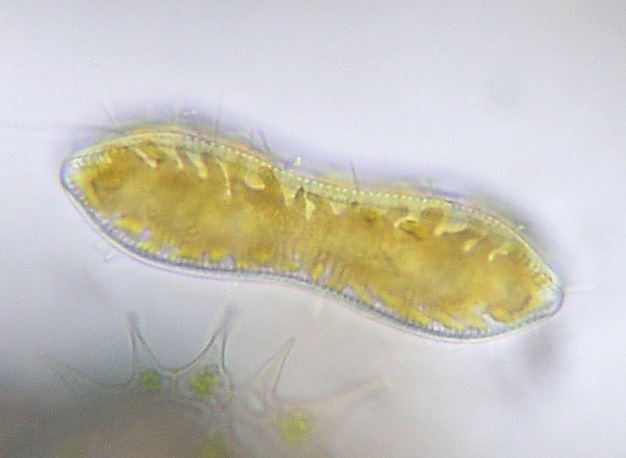
- Surirella librile

Scientific classification
- Domain: Eukaryota
- Clade: Sar
- Clade: Stramenopiles
- Division: Ochrophyta
- Clade: Diatomeae
- Class: Bacillariophyceae
- Subclass: Bacillariophycidae
- Order: Surirellales; D.G.Mann, 1990

Families
- Auriculaceae; Entomoneidaceae; Surirellaceae; Rhopalodiaceae

Synonyms
- Rhopalodiales D.G.Mann, 1990

= Surirellales =

Order of single-celled organisms

Surirellales is an order of diatoms. It is paraphyletic to Rhopalodiales, which was merged into this order in the treatment of Ruck et al., 2016. If Rhopalodiales is to be restored, what is currently known as Surirellales will need to be split into two orders.
