= List of Navicula species =

List of plankton species in the genus Navicula.

== Species ==
As of August 2015, Algaebase lists 1280 accepted species and more than 1900 proposed species in the plankton genus Navicula. They include:

=== A ===
- Navicula abbotti
- Navicula abbottii
- Navicula abbreviata
- Navicula abdita
- Navicula abducta
- Navicula abelioensis
- Navicula aberrans
- Navicula abica
- Navicula abiskoensis
- Navicula aboensis
- Navicula abonuensis
- Navicula abraensis
- Navicula abrupta
- Navicula abscondita
- Navicula abstrusa
- Navicula abuensis
- Navicula abunda
- Navicula abundoides
- Navicula acacia
- Navicula accedens
- Navicula accommoda
- Navicula accurata
- Navicula achthera
- Navicula acephala
- Navicula achnanthoides
- Navicula achthera
- Navicula acidobionta
- Navicula acidobiontica
- Navicula acidophila
- Navicula acrosphaeria
- Navicula actinota
- Navicula acus
- Navicula acuta
- Navicula acuticuneata
- Navicula acuticuneatula
- Navicula acutirostris
- Navicula acutissima
- Navicula acutissima
- Navicula adakensis
- Navicula adakensis
- Navicula adamantiformis
- Navicula adamata
- Navicula addae
- Navicula admenda
- Navicula adami
- Navicula adampeensis
- Navicula adamsii
- Navicula addaae
- Navicula addae
- Navicula addicta
- Navicula admenda
- Navicula adminensis
- Navicula adnatoides
- Navicula adonis
- Navicula adumbrata
- Navicula advena
- Navicula adversa
- Navicula adversatrix
- Navicula aedifex
- Navicula aegyptiaca
- Navicula aemula
- Navicula aequalis
- Navicula aequinoctialis
- Navicula aequora
- Navicula aequoria
- Navicula aestimata
- Navicula aestiva
- Navicula affinis
- Navicula affirmata
- Navicula africana
- Navicula agatkae
- Navicula agma
- Navicula agellus
- Navicula aggerica
- Navicula aggesta
- Navicula aglaos
- Navicula agnita
- Navicula agma
- Navicula agmastriata
- Navicula agnewii
- Navicula agnita
- Navicula agrestiformis
- Navicula agulhasica
- Navicula ahmedabadensis
- Navicula aikenenses
- Navicula aikenensis
- Navicula airdevronsixii
- Navicula aitchelbee
- Navicula ajajensis
- Navicula aikensis
- Navicula airdevronsixii
- Navicula ajajensis
- Navicula ajenaensis
- Navicula aketechiensis
- Navicula albanica
- Navicula akimensis
- Navicula aktinoides
- Navicula alaskana
- Navicula alea
- Navicula aleemi
- Navicula algor
- Navicula aleemii
- Navicula algeriensis
- Navicula aleksandrae
- Navicula algida
- Navicula algor
- Navicula alineae
- Navicula alisoviana
- Navicula altiplanensis
- Navicula alineae
- Navicula alisoviana
- Navicula allista
- Navicula allmaniana
- Navicula allorgei
- Navicula alpestris
- Navicula alpha
- Navicula alpina
- Navicula alternans
- Navicula alterofasciata
- Navicula altiplanensis
- Navicula amabilis
- Navicula ambigua
- Navicula americana
- Navicula amerinda
- Navicula amica
- Navicula amicii
- Navicula amicorum
- Navicula ammophila
- Navicula amnicola
- Navicula amoena
- Navicula amoena
- Navicula amoenaeformis
- Navicula amphibola
- Navicula amphiceropsis
- Navicula amphiceros
- Navicula amphilepta
- Navicula amphirhychus
- Navicula amphirhynchus
- Navicula amphirrhina
- Navicula amphirhychus
- Navicula amphisphenia
- Navicula amphistylus
- Navicula amphoroides
- Navicula ampliata
- Navicula amygdalina
- Navicula anassae
- Navicula anatis
- Navicula anca
- Navicula anceps
- Navicula ancilla
- Navicula ancilla
- Navicula ancisa
- Navicula ancora
- Navicula anderabensis
- Navicula anderssonii
- Navicula andesitica
- Navicula andicola
- Navicula andium
- Navicula andrussowii
- Navicula anenuta
- Navicula angelica
- Navicula angelorum
- Navicula angleana
- Navicula anglica
- Navicula anglophila
- Navicula angolensis
- Navicula angulati
- Navicula angulosa
- Navicula angarae
- Navicula angelica
- Navicula angulosa
- Navicula angusta
- Navicula anguste-fasciata
- Navicula angustissima
- Navicula anhuiensis
- Navicula anna
- Navicula ankobraensis
- Navicula annexa
- Navicula annulana
- Navicula anopaia
- Navicula antarctica
- Navicula antarctica
- Navicula antediluviana
- Navicula antediluvianum
- Navicula anthracis
- Navicula antigua
- Navicula antillarum
- Navicula antiqua
- Navicula antonii
- Navicula antonioides
- Navicula aparta
- Navicula aperta
- Navicula apia
- Navicula apiculata
- Navicula antediluvianum
- Navicula antigua
- Navicula antiqua
- Navicula antonii
- Navicula antonioides
- Navicula antverpiensis
- Navicula apiculata
- Navicula apiculatoreinhardtii
- Navicula applicita
- Navicula applicitoides
- Navicula approximatella
- Navicula aquaedurae
- Navicula applicitoides
- Navicula approximata
- Navicula apsteinii
- Navicula apta
- Navicula aquaeductae
- Navicula aquitaniae
- Navicula aquitaniae
- Navicula aquosa
- Navicula aradina
- Navicula aranaria
- Navicula arata
- Navicula araucaniana
- Navicula arcana
- Navicula archeriana
- Navicula archibaldiana
- Navicula arcta
- Navicula arctica
- Navicula arctotenelloides
- Navicula arcuata
- Navicula ardis
- Navicula ardua
- Navicula arenaria
- Navicula archeriana
- Navicula arctotenelloides
- Navicula applanata
- Navicula applicita
- Navicula appendiculata
- Navicula arenariaeformis
- Navicula arenicola
- Navicula arenosa
- Navicula arenaria
- Navicula arenariaeformis
- Navicula arenicola
- Navicula arenula
- Navicula argens
- Navicula argunensis
- Navicula argutiola
- Navicula ariiensis
- Navicula arkona
- Navicula armata
- Navicula armoricana
- Navicula arenula
- Navicula areschougiana
- Navicula argens
- Navicula arguens
- Navicula argunensis
- Navicula argutiola
- Navicula arkona
- Navicula armata
- Navicula armoricana
- Navicula arraniensis
- Navicula artemidis
- Navicula artificiosa
- Navicula arvensiformis
- Navicula arvensis
- Navicula arverna
- Navicula aspergilla
- Navicula associata
- Navicula asymbasia
- Navicula arvensoides
- Navicula arverna
- Navicula asanwinsoensis
- Navicula ashantiensis
- Navicula asiatica
- Navicula asklepieionensis
- Navicula aspera
- Navicula aspergilla
- Navicula aspersa
- Navicula asperula
- Navicula associata
- Navicula assula
- Navicula assuloides
- Navicula assymetrica
- Navicula astrolabensis
- Navicula asymbasia
- Navicula asymetrica
- Navicula asymmetrica
- Navicula atacamana
- Navicula atacamae
- Navicula atasensis
- Navicula athenae
- Navicula atlantica
- Navicula atwateri
- Navicula arvensoides
- Navicula arverna
- Navicula asanwinsoensis
- Navicula ashantiensis
- Navicula asiatica
- Navicula asklepieionensis
- Navicula aspera
- Navicula aspergilla
- Navicula aspersa
- Navicula asperula
- Navicula associata
- Navicula assula
- Navicula assuloides
- Navicula assymetrica
- Navicula astrolabensis
- Navicula asymbasia
- Navicula asymetrica
- Navicula asymmetrica
- Navicula atacamae
- Navicula atacamana
- Navicula atalos
- Navicula athenae
- Navicula atlantica
- Navicula atomarius
- Navicula atomoides
- Navicula atomus
- Navicula atomus
- Navicula atwateri
- Navicula aubertii
- Navicula aucklandica
- Navicula aueri
- Navicula aulacophaena
- Navicula aurangabadensis
- Navicula aurantiaca
- Navicula aurora
- Navicula australica
- Navicula australomediocris
- Navicula australoceanica
- Navicula australoshetlandica
- Navicula austrocollegarum
- Navicula avenaceoides
- Navicula avonensis

=== B ===
- Navicula baardsethii
- Navicula baccata
- Navicula bacillaris
- Navicula bacillifera
- Navicula bacilliformis
- Navicula bacillum
- Navicula bacterium
- Navicula bacula
- Navicula bahiensis
- Navicula bahuensoides
- Navicula bahusiensis
- Navicula baileyana
- Navicula baileyi
- Navicula bainii
- Navicula balcanica
- Navicula balnearis
- Navicula bamboiensis
- Navicula bannajensis
- Navicula bansoensis
- Navicula barbadense
- Navicula barbadensis
- Navicula barbara
- Navicula barbarica
- Navicula barberiana
- Navicula barbitos
- Navicula barclayana
- Navicula barentsii
- Navicula barkeriana
- Navicula barklayana
- Navicula barodensis
- Navicula barrowiana
- Navicula bartholomei
- Navicula basaltaeproxima
- Navicula basilica
- Navicula basillica
- Navicula bastianii
- Navicula bastowii
- Navicula bauemleri
- Navicula bauemlerii
- Navicula bawdiaensis
- Navicula bayleana
- Navicula bdesma
- Navicula beaufortiana
- Navicula beccariana
- Navicula beckii
- Navicula begeri
- Navicula begerii
- Navicula beketowii
- Navicula bella
- Navicula bellatii
- Navicula belliatula
- Navicula bellissima
- Navicula belsesiensis
- Navicula bendaensis
- Navicula bengalensis
- Navicula bergenensis
- Navicula bergeni
- Navicula bergerii
- Navicula berriati
- Navicula bertelsenii
- Navicula bertrandi
- Navicula besarensis
- Navicula beta
- Navicula beyrichiana
- Navicula biaculeata
- Navicula biakensis
- Navicula bicapitata
- Navicula bicapitellata
- Navicula bicarinata
- Navicula bicephala
- Navicula bicephaloides
- Navicula biceps
- Navicula biclavata
- Navicula biconica
- Navicula biconifera
- Navicula biconstricta
- Navicula bicontracta
- Navicula bicuneolus
- Navicula bicuspidata
- Navicula biddulphioides
- Navicula bidentula
- Navicula bievexa
- Navicula bifax
- Navicula bifissa
- Navicula biflexa
- Navicula bifurcatula
- Navicula bigemmata
- Navicula biglobosa
- Navicula bilineata
- Navicula bilobata
- Navicula bimaculata
- Navicula binaria
- Navicula binodis
- Navicula binodulosa
- Navicula bintila
- Navicula bioculata
- Navicula bipectinalis
- Navicula bipunctata
- Navicula bipunctata
- Navicula bipustulata
- Navicula birhis
- Navicula birostrata
- Navicula birostris
- Navicula biscalaris
- Navicula biseriata
- Navicula biskanterae
- Navicula biskanteri
- Navicula bistriata
- Navicula bisulcata
- Navicula bita
- Navicula bituminosa
- Navicula biwaensis
- Navicula bjoernoeyaensis
- Navicula blasii
- Navicula bleischiana
- Navicula bleischii
- Navicula blessingii
- Navicula blotii
- Navicula bodosensis
- Navicula boeckii
- Navicula boergesenii
- Navicula bogotensis
- Navicula bolleana
- Navicula bombiformis
- Navicula bomboides
- Navicula bombus
- Navicula bongrainii
- Navicula bonnieri
- Navicula borbassii
- Navicula borealis
- Navicula borinquensis
- Navicula borneoensis
- Navicula borowkae
- Navicula borrichii
- Navicula borussica
- Navicula boryana
- Navicula boseana
- Navicula bossvikensis
- Navicula bosumtwiensis
- Navicula botteriana
- Navicula bottnica
- Navicula boudetii
- Navicula bouhardi
- Navicula bourgi
- Navicula bourrellyi
- Navicula bourrellyivera
- Navicula boyei
- Navicula bozenae
- Navicula branchiata
- Navicula brasiliana
- Navicula brasiliensis
- Navicula braunii
- Navicula brebissonii
- Navicula breenii
- Navicula brehmi
- Navicula brehmii
- Navicula brehmioides
- Navicula breitenbuchii
- Navicula brekkaensis
- Navicula bremensis
- Navicula bremeyeri
- Navicula breviata
- Navicula brevirostrata
- Navicula brevis
- Navicula brevissima
- Navicula brockmanni
- Navicula brockmannii
- Navicula broetzii
- Navicula bruchi
- Navicula bruchii
- Navicula brunelii
- Navicula bruni
- Navicula brunii
- Navicula bruyanti
- Navicula bryophila
- Navicula bryophiloides
- Navicula buccella
- Navicula buchansiana
- Navicula budayana
- Navicula budda
- Navicula budensis
- Navicula buderiformis
- Navicula bullata
- Navicula bulnheimii
- Navicula burcki
- Navicula bushmanorum
- Navicula butreensis

=== C ===
- Navicula caddoensis
- Navicula caenosus
- Navicula calcuttensis
- Navicula calcuttensis
- Navicula caldwellii
- Navicula calida
- Navicula californica
- Navicula caliginosa
- Navicula calva
- Navicula calvata
- Navicula camerata
- Navicula campanilae
- Navicula campbellii
- Navicula campylodiscus
- Navicula canaliculata
- Navicula canalis
- Navicula canariana
- Navicula cancelleta
- Navicula candida
- Navicula cantonatii
- Navicula cantonensis
- Navicula capensis
- Navicula capillata
- Navicula capitata
- Navicula capitatoradiata
- Navicula capitellata
- Navicula capitoradiata
- Navicula capitulata
- Navicula capsa
- Navicula capsula
- Navicula caractacus
- Navicula carassius
- Navicula cardinaliculus
- Navicula cardinalis
- Navicula carecti
- Navicula cari
- Navicula caribaea
- Navicula carinata
- Navicula carinifera
- Navicula cariocincta
- Navicula carissima
- Navicula carloffii
- Navicula carminata
- Navicula carolinensis
- Navicula carpathorum
- Navicula carstensenii
- Navicula carteri
- Navicula carvajaliana
- Navicula casca
- Navicula cascadensis
- Navicula casertana
- Navicula cassieana
- Navicula castracanei
- Navicula catalanogermanica
- Navicula cataracta-rheni
- Navicula cataractarum
- Navicula catarinensis
- Navicula caterva
- Navicula catharinae
- Navicula caupulus
- Navicula cavernae
- Navicula ceciliae
- Navicula celinei
- Navicula cellesensis
- Navicula cendronii
- Navicula centraster
- Navicula centropunctata
- Navicula cephalodes
- Navicula ceratogramma
- Navicula ceratostigma
- Navicula ceres
- Navicula cerneutia
- Navicula cesatii
- Navicula ceylanensis
- Navicula chaberti
- Navicula chadwickii
- Navicula chandolensis
- Navicula charlatii
- Navicula charlottae
- Navicula charontis
- Navicula chasei
- Navicula chasmaensis
- Navicula chasmigera
- Navicula chaspula
- Navicula chassagnei
- Navicula chauhanii
- Navicula cherubim
- Navicula chi
- Navicula chiarae
- Navicula chiengmaiensis
- Navicula chilena
- Navicula chilensis
- Navicula chimmoana
- Navicula chinensis
- Navicula chingmaiensis
- Navicula chloridorum
- Navicula cholnokyana
- Navicula cholnokyii
- Navicula chordata
- Navicula chrissiana
- Navicula chutteri
- Navicula chyzerii
- Navicula ciliata
- Navicula cimex
- Navicula cincta
- Navicula cinctaeformis
- Navicula cingens
- Navicula cingulatoides
- Navicula cinna
- Navicula circumnodosa
- Navicula circumtexta
- Navicula circumvallata
- Navicula cistella
- Navicula citrea
- Navicula citriformis
- Navicula clagesii
- Navicula clamans
- Navicula clarensiana
- Navicula claromontensis
- Navicula clathrata
- Navicula clavata
- Navicula claviana
- Navicula claytoni
- Navicula claytonii
- Navicula clementis
- Navicula clementoides
- Navicula climacospheniae
- Navicula cluthensis
- Navicula cluthensoides
- Navicula clypeus
- Navicula coarctata
- Navicula coccinella
- Navicula cocconeiformis
- Navicula cocconeoides
- Navicula cocconioides
- Navicula coccus
- Navicula cochlearis
- Navicula coei
- Navicula coelata
- Navicula coerulea
- Navicula coffeiformis
- Navicula colii
- Navicula collersonii
- Navicula collertsonii
- Navicula collisiana
- Navicula columbiana
- Navicula columnaris
- Navicula comerei
- Navicula commixta
- Navicula commutabilis
- Navicula commutata
- Navicula comoides
- Navicula compacta
- Navicula compar
- Navicula comperei
- Navicula complanata
- Navicula complanatoides
- Navicula completa 1
- Navicula completaoides
- Navicula compositestriata
- Navicula compressicauda
- Navicula concamerata
- Navicula concentrica
- Navicula concilians
- Navicula concinna
- Navicula confecta
- Navicula confervacea
- Navicula confidens
- Navicula congerana
- Navicula congolensis
- Navicula congrua
- Navicula conjugata
- Navicula conjuncta
- Navicula connectens
- Navicula conops
- Navicula consanguinea
- Navicula conscensa
- Navicula consentanea
- Navicula consimilis
- Navicula consors
- Navicula conspersa
- Navicula constans
- Navicula constantinii
- Navicula constricta
- Navicula contempta
- Navicula contenta
- Navicula contentaeformis
- Navicula contermina
- Navicula contigua
- Navicula contorta
- Navicula contortula
- Navicula contracta
- Navicula contraria
- Navicula controversa
- Navicula conveniens
- Navicula convergens
- Navicula conveyi
- Navicula copiosa
- Navicula coquedensis
- Navicula coraliana
- Navicula corbieri
- Navicula cordillerae
- Navicula cornubiensis
- Navicula coronensis
- Navicula corpulenta
- Navicula correpta
- Navicula corrugata
- Navicula cortanensis
- Navicula corticola
- Navicula corymbosa
- Navicula cosmaria
- Navicula costata
- Navicula costei
- Navicula costulata
- Navicula costuloides
- Navicula cotiformis
- Navicula couperi
- Navicula crabro
- Navicula crabroniformis
- Navicula crassirostris
- Navicula crassula
- Navicula crassulexigua
- Navicula crassuliexigua
- Navicula crateri
- Navicula craticula
- Navicula craticularis
- Navicula craveni
- Navicula creguti
- Navicula cremeri
- Navicula cremorne
- Navicula crepitacula
- Navicula creuzbergensis
- Navicula criophila
- Navicula crispa
- Navicula cristula
- Navicula crocodili
- Navicula cronullensis
- Navicula crucialis
- Navicula cruciata
- Navicula crucifera
- Navicula crucifix
- Navicula cruciformis
- Navicula crucigera
- Navicula crucigeriformis
- Navicula crux
- Navicula cruxmeridionalis
- Navicula cryophila
- Navicula cryptocephala
- Navicula cryptocephaloides
- Navicula cryptofallax
- Navicula cryptonella
- Navicula cryptorrhynchus
- Navicula cryptostriata
- Navicula cryptotenella
- Navicula cryptotenelloides
- Navicula csaszkaae
- Navicula cubitus
- Navicula cumbriensis
- Navicula cumvibia
- Navicula cunctans
- Navicula curiosa
- Navicula cursoria
- Navicula curta
- Navicula curtestria
- Navicula curtisterna
- Navicula curvilineata
- Navicula curvinervia
- Navicula curvipunctata
- Navicula cuspidata
- Navicula cuspis
- Navicula cuvella
- Navicula cyclophora
- Navicula cyclops
- Navicula cymatopleura
- Navicula cymbelliformis
- Navicula cymbelloides
- Navicula cymbula
- Navicula cyprinus
- Navicula czekehazensis

=== D ===
- Navicula dactylus
- Navicula dahomensis
- Navicula dahurica
- Navicula dailyi
- Navicula dalmatica
- Navicula damasii
- Navicula damongensis
- Navicula dariana
- Navicula dartevellei
- Navicula darwiniana
- Navicula davidsoniana
- Navicula de-toniana
- Navicula de-wittiana
- Navicula dealpina
- Navicula debegenica
- Navicula debilis
- Navicula debilissima
- Navicula debilitata
- Navicula deblockii
- Navicula debyi
- Navicula dechambrei
- Navicula decipiens
- Navicula decissa
- Navicula declinata
- Navicula decora
- Navicula decrescens
- Navicula decumana
- Navicula decurrens
- Navicula decussata
- Navicula decussepunctata
- Navicula definita
- Navicula defluens
- Navicula degenii
- Navicula dehissa
- Navicula delastriata
- Navicula delata
- Navicula delawarensis
- Navicula delecta
- Navicula delginensis
- Navicula deliberata
- Navicula delicata
- Navicula delognei
- Navicula delpiroui
- Navicula delta
- Navicula deltaica
- Navicula demerara
- Navicula demerarae
- Navicula demeraroides
- Navicula demissa
- Navicula demta
- Navicula denizotii
- Navicula densa
- Navicula denselineolata
- Navicula densepunctata
- Navicula densestriata
- Navicula densilineolata
- Navicula densistriata
- Navicula densuensis
- Navicula denticulata
- Navicula denudata
- Navicula depauxii
- Navicula depressa
- Navicula derasa
- Navicula descripta
- Navicula deserti
- Navicula destituta
- Navicula detenta
- Navicula detersa
- Navicula diabolica
- Navicula diaculus
- Navicula diagonalis
- Navicula diahotana
- Navicula diaphana
- Navicula diaphanea
- Navicula dibola
- Navicula dicephala
- Navicula dicurvata
- Navicula didyma
- Navicula diengensis
- Navicula differta
- Navicula difficilis
- Navicula difficillima
- Navicula difficillimoides
- Navicula diffluens
- Navicula difformis
- Navicula diffusa
- Navicula dificilis
- Navicula digito
- Navicula digito-radiata
- Navicula digitoconvergens
- Navicula digitoradiata
- Navicula digitulus
- Navicula digna
- Navicula digrediens
- Navicula digtoradiata
- Navicula dilata
- Navicula dilatata
- Navicula dilucida
- Navicula dimidiata
- Navicula diomphala
- Navicula diploneiformis
- Navicula diplosticta
- Navicula directa
- Navicula dirhynchus
- Navicula dirrhombus
- Navicula discernenda
- Navicula disclusa
- Navicula discrepans
- Navicula disertoides
- Navicula disjuncta
- Navicula disjunctoides
- Navicula dispar
- Navicula disparalis
- Navicula disparata
- Navicula dispensata
- Navicula dispersa
- Navicula dispersepunctata
- Navicula dispersepunctulata
- Navicula disposita
- Navicula disputans
- Navicula dissimilis
- Navicula dissipata
- Navicula dissipata
- Navicula dissuta
- Navicula distans
- Navicula distantepunctata
- Navicula distauridium
- Navicula distenta
- Navicula disticha
- Navicula distincta
- Navicula distinctastriata
- Navicula distoma
- Navicula diuturna
- Navicula diuturnoides
- Navicula divaricata
- Navicula divergens
- Navicula diversa
- Navicula diversestriata
- Navicula diversipunctata
- Navicula diversistriata
- Navicula diverta
- Navicula dobrinatemniskovae
- Navicula dodowaensis
- Navicula doehleri
- Navicula doello-juradoi
- Navicula doeringii
- Navicula doljensis
- Navicula dolosa
- Navicula dolosa
- Navicula donkinia
- Navicula dorenbergi
- Navicula dorogostaiskyi
- Navicula dosseti-azpeitia
- Navicula dubia
- Navicula dubitata
- Navicula dubravicensis
- Navicula duerrenbergiana
- Navicula dugaensis
- Navicula dulcioides
- Navicula dulcis
- Navicula dumontiae
- Navicula dunstonii
- Navicula duomedia
- Navicula duplex
- Navicula duplicata
- Navicula duplocapitata
- Navicula durandii
- Navicula dutoitana
- Navicula dux
- Navicula dvorachekii
- Navicula dystrophica

=== E ===
- Navicula ebor
- Navicula eburnea
- Navicula ectoris
- Navicula effrenata
- Navicula egena
- Navicula egeria
- Navicula egregia
- Navicula egyptiaca
- Navicula ehrenbergii
- Navicula ehrlichiae
- Navicula eichhorniaephila
- Navicula eichhorniophila
- Navicula eidrigeana
- Navicula eiowana
- Navicula ekholmensis
- Navicula el-kab
- Navicula elaborata
- Navicula elaphros
- Navicula electa
- Navicula electrolytifuga
- Navicula elegans
- Navicula elegantissima
- Navicula elegantoides
- Navicula elegantula
- Navicula elenkinii
- Navicula elephantis
- Navicula elesdiana
- Navicula elevata
- Navicula elginensis
- Navicula elkab
- Navicula ellips
- Navicula ellipsis
- Navicula elliptica
- Navicula elmorei
- Navicula elongata
- Navicula elongatula
- Navicula elpatievskyi
- Navicula elsae-thum
- Navicula elsoniana
- Navicula emarginata
- Navicula endophytica
- Navicula engelbrechtii
- Navicula ennediensis
- Navicula entoleia
- Navicula entomon
- Navicula entzii
- Navicula enucleata
- Navicula eocaenica
- Navicula episcopalis
- Navicula eponka
- Navicula epsilon
- Navicula equiornata
- Navicula erdmannensis
- Navicula ergadensis
- Navicula erifuga
- Navicula erosa
- Navicula erythraea
- Navicula esamangensis
- Navicula escambia
- Navicula esoculus
- Navicula esox
- Navicula eta
- Navicula eugeniae
- Navicula eumontana
- Navicula euryale
- Navicula eurycephala
- Navicula eurysoma
- Navicula evexa
- Navicula evulsa
- Navicula exasperans
- Navicula excavata
- Navicula excavata
- Navicula excellens
- Navicula excentrica
- Navicula excepta
- Navicula exemta
- Navicula exigua
- Navicula exiguiformis
- Navicula exiguoides
- Navicula exiguoidis
- Navicula exiliformis
- Navicula exilior
- Navicula exilis
- Navicula exilissima
- Navicula exillima
- Navicula eximia
- Navicula expecta
- Navicula expectilis
- Navicula expedita
- Navicula expeditionis
- Navicula explanata
- Navicula expleta
- Navicula explicata
- Navicula explicatoides
- Navicula explorata
- Navicula eymei

=== F ===
- Navicula faba
- Navicula faceta
- Navicula facilis
- Navicula falaisiensis
- Navicula falax
- Navicula falklandiae
- Navicula fallax
- Navicula falsalyra
- Navicula famintzinii
- Navicula faoensis
- Navicula farakulumensis
- Navicula farcimen
- Navicula farta
- Navicula fasciata
- Navicula fatigans
- Navicula fauta
- Navicula fawumangensis
- Navicula febigeri
- Navicula febigerii
- Navicula fennica
- Navicula fennoscandica
- Navicula fernandae
- Navicula fernandesii
- Navicula fernandi-koburg
- Navicula ferrazae
- Navicula festiva
- Navicula feuerborni
- Navicula feuerbornii
- Navicula filarszkyana
- Navicula filarszkyi
- Navicula filholi
- Navicula filiformis
- Navicula finitima
- Navicula finmarchica
- Navicula finnmarchica
- Navicula firma
- Navicula fischeri
- Navicula flabellata
- Navicula flagellifera
- Navicula flahaulti
- Navicula flamma
- Navicula flammarionensis
- Navicula flammula
- Navicula flanatica
- Navicula flattii
- Navicula flebilis
- Navicula flexuosa
- Navicula florentina
- Navicula floridae
- Navicula floridana
- Navicula florinae
- Navicula floriniae
- Navicula fluens
- Navicula fluitans
- Navicula fluminensis
- Navicula fluminisirtysch
- Navicula fluminitica
- Navicula fluviae-jenisseyi
- Navicula foliola
- Navicula folium
- Navicula fontana
- Navicula fontellii
- Navicula fonticola
- Navicula fontinalis
- Navicula forcipata
- Navicula formenterae
- Navicula formicata
- Navicula formicina
- Navicula formosa
- Navicula fortis
- Navicula fortunata
- Navicula fossilioides
- Navicula fossilis
- Navicula fragilarioides
- Navicula fragilis
- Navicula franciscae
- Navicula frasnensis
- Navicula fraudulenta
- Navicula freesei
- Navicula frenguellii
- Navicula frequens
- Navicula frickei
- Navicula frickei
- Navicula friesneri
- Navicula frigida
- Navicula frisiae
- Navicula friska
- Navicula fromenterae
- Navicula frugalis
- Navicula frustuliaeformis
- Navicula frustuloides
- Navicula fuchsii
- Navicula fuegiana
- Navicula fuegiana
- Navicula fuenzalidae
- Navicula fukiensis
- Navicula fundata
- Navicula funiculata
- Navicula furtiva
- Navicula fusca
- Navicula fuscata
- Navicula fusidium
- Navicula fusiformis
- Navicula fusiformis-vahliana
- Navicula fusioides
- Navicula fustis
- Navicula fusus
- Navicula futilis

=== G ===
- Navicula galapagoensis
- Navicula galea
- Navicula galikii
- Navicula gallapagensis
- Navicula gallica
- Navicula galvagensis
- Navicula gamma
- Navicula gandhii
- Navicula gandrupi
- Navicula garganica
- Navicula garkeana
- Navicula gasilidei
- Navicula gastriformis
- Navicula gastroides
- Navicula gastrum
- Navicula gauthieri
- Navicula gebhardi
- Navicula gebhardii
- Navicula geinitzi
- Navicula geisslerae
- Navicula geitleri
- Navicula gelida
- Navicula gemina
- Navicula geminata
- Navicula gemmata
- Navicula gemmatula
- Navicula gemmeta
- Navicula gendrei
- Navicula genevensis
- Navicula geniculata
- Navicula genifera
- Navicula genovefae
- Navicula genustriata
- Navicula gerloffi
- Navicula gerloffii
- Navicula germanopolonica
- Navicula geronimensis
- Navicula gibba
- Navicula gibberula
- Navicula gibbosa
- Navicula giebelii
- Navicula gieskesii
- Navicula gigantorum
- Navicula gigas
- Navicula gilva
- Navicula girodi
- Navicula girondica
- Navicula glaberrima
- Navicula glaberrimum
- Navicula glabra
- Navicula glabrissima n
- Navicula glabriuscula
- Navicula glacialis
- Navicula glaciei
- Navicula glangeaudi
- Navicula glans
- Navicula glasovii
- Navicula globiceps
- Navicula globifera
- Navicula globosa
- Navicula globosaoides
- Navicula globulifera
- Navicula globuliferiformis
- Navicula glomus
- Navicula gloriosa
- Navicula gloriosa
- Navicula godfroyi
- Navicula goeppertiana
- Navicula goersii
- Navicula gomontiana
- Navicula gomphonemacea
- Navicula gomphonemoides
- Navicula gondwana
- Navicula gonzalvesiana
- Navicula gordonii
- Navicula gorjanovicii
- Navicula gothlandica
- Navicula gotlandica
- Navicula gottlandica
- Navicula gourdonii
- Navicula gouwsii
- Navicula gracilis
- Navicula gracillima
- Navicula graciloides
- Navicula gradata
- Navicula gradatoides
- Navicula graeffii
- Navicula gralana
- Navicula grammitis
- Navicula granii
- Navicula granoryza
- Navicula granulata
- Navicula granulifer
- Navicula granum
- Navicula granum-avenae
- Navicula grasmueckii
- Navicula grata
- Navicula gratissima
- Navicula gregaria
- Navicula gregaria
- Navicula gregaria
- Navicula gregarioides
- Navicula gregoriana
- Navicula gregorii
- Navicula gretharum
- Navicula grevilleana
- Navicula grevillei
- Navicula grevilleoides
- Navicula grevillii
- Navicula grimmei
- Navicula grimmeioides
- Navicula grimmii
- Navicula grimmioides
- Navicula grippii
- Navicula groenlandica
- Navicula groschopfi
- Navicula groschopfii
- Navicula grovei
- Navicula grudeensis
- Navicula gruendleri
- Navicula gruendleriana
- Navicula grundtvigii
- Navicula grunovii
- Navicula grunowii
- Navicula guadalupensis
- Navicula guarujana
- Navicula guatemalensis
- Navicula guaynaboensis
- Navicula guetharyana
- Navicula guihotii
- Navicula guinardiana
- Navicula guluensis
- Navicula gurovii
- Navicula guttata
- Navicula guttulifera
- Navicula gutwinskii
- Navicula gyrinida
- Navicula gysigensis

=== H ===
- Navicula h-album
- Navicula habena
- Navicula habita
- Navicula hagelsteinii
- Navicula hahni
- Navicula hahnii
- Navicula halinae
- Navicula halionata
- Navicula halophila
- Navicula halophiloides
- Navicula hamiltonii
- Navicula hamulifera
- Navicula hangchowensis
- Navicula hankae
- Navicula hanseatica
- Navicula hanseniana
- Navicula hantkenii
- Navicula haradaae
- Navicula harbinensis
- Navicula harderi
- Navicula harpa
- Navicula harrisoniana
- Navicula hartii
- Navicula hartzii
- Navicula hasta
- Navicula hastaeformis
- Navicula hastata
- Navicula hastatula
- Navicula hauckii
- Navicula haueri
- Navicula hawaiensis
- Navicula hawaiiensis
- Navicula haynaldii
- Navicula haytiana
- Navicula hazslinszkyi
- Navicula hebes
- Navicula hecateia
- Navicula heeri
- Navicula heilprinensis
- Navicula heimansioides
- Navicula heimii
- Navicula helea
- Navicula helensoides
- Navicula helmandensis
- Navicula helminae
- Navicula helvetica
- Navicula hemiptera
- Navicula hemiviridula
- Navicula henckeli
- Navicula hennedyi
- Navicula hennedyii
- Navicula henriquesii
- Navicula herbstiae
- Navicula heribaudi
- Navicula hermanii
- Navicula heteroflexa
- Navicula heterostriata
- Navicula heterovalvata
- Navicula heufleri
- Navicula heufleriana
- Navicula hevesensis
- Navicula hexapla
- Navicula hibernica
- Navicula hilarula
- Navicula hilliardi
- Navicula hilliardii
- Navicula hintzii
- Navicula hirudo
- Navicula hitchcocki
- Navicula hochstetteri
- Navicula hochstetteriana
- Navicula hodgeana
- Navicula hoefleri
- Navicula hoeflerii
- Navicula hoffmannii
- Navicula hofmanniae
- Navicula hollandica
- Navicula hollerupensis
- Navicula holmiensis
- Navicula holstii
- Navicula holubyi
- Navicula homburgiana
- Navicula hordeiformis
- Navicula hornigii
- Navicula horstii
- Navicula hospes
- Navicula huei
- Navicula hugenottarum
- Navicula humboldtiana
- Navicula humerosa arabica
- Navicula humjibreensis
- Navicula hungarica
- Navicula huniensis
- Navicula husi
- Navicula hustedtiana
- Navicula hustedtii
- Navicula hyalina
- Navicula hyalina
- Navicula hyalosira
- Navicula hybrida
- Navicula hyperborea
- Navicula hyrtlii

=== I ===
- Navicula iasnitskii
- Navicula iberica
- Navicula icostauron
- Navicula ignobilis
- Navicula ignota
- Navicula ikari
- Navicula illicita
- Navicula illinoensis
- Navicula illustra
- Navicula illustris
- Navicula ilopangoensis
- Navicula imbecilla
- Navicula imbellis
- Navicula impangenica
- Navicula imperfecta
- Navicula imperialis
- Navicula impertila
- Navicula impexa
- Navicula implana
- Navicula impossibilis
- Navicula impressa
- Navicula inattigens
- Navicula incarum
- Navicula incisa
- Navicula inclinata
- Navicula includens
- Navicula incognita
- Navicula incomitatus
- Navicula incomperta
- Navicula incomposita
- Navicula incongruens
- Navicula incudiformis
- Navicula inculta
- Navicula incurva
- Navicula incus
- Navicula indefinita
- Navicula indemnis
- Navicula index
- Navicula indianensis
- Navicula indica
- Navicula indigens
- Navicula inducens
- Navicula indulgens
- Navicula inelegans
- Navicula inexacta
- Navicula inexpectans
- Navicula inexplorata
- Navicula infaceta
- Navicula infirma
- Navicula infirmata
- Navicula infirmitata
- Navicula inflasa
- Navicula inflata
- Navicula inflatoides
- Navicula inflexa
- Navicula infrenis
- Navicula ingapirca
- Navicula ingens
- Navicula ingenua
- Navicula ingoldii
- Navicula ingrata
- Navicula ingstadii
- Navicula ingustata
- Navicula inhalata
- Navicula inhalata
- Navicula injusta
- Navicula innommata
- Navicula inornata
- Navicula inpunctata
- Navicula inquisitor
- Navicula inscendens
- Navicula insepta
- Navicula insequens
- Navicula inserata
- Navicula inseriata
- Navicula insignificans
- Navicula insignis
- Navicula insignita
- Navicula insociabilis
- Navicula insolita
- Navicula insolubilis
- Navicula insularis
- Navicula insulsa
- Navicula insuta
- Navicula intacta
- Navicula integra
- Navicula intercedens
- Navicula interglacialis
- Navicula interlineata
- Navicula intermedia
- Navicula intermixta
- Navicula interrupta
- Navicula interruptestriata
- Navicula intractata
- Navicula intricata
- Navicula inutilis
- Navicula invenusta
- Navicula inversa
- Navicula invicta
- Navicula invisitata
- Navicula involata
- Navicula involuta
- Navicula iota
- Navicula iranensis
- Navicula irata
- Navicula ireneae
- Navicula iridis
- Navicula irmengardis
- Navicula irregularis
- Navicula irreversa
- Navicula irritans
- Navicula irrorata
- Navicula irroratoides
- Navicula isabelensiformis
- Navicula isabelensiminor
- Navicula isabelensis
- Navicula isabelensoides
- Navicula iserentantii
- Navicula isertii
- Navicula islandica
- Navicula isocephala
- Navicula isostauron
- Navicula iversenii
- Navicula ivigtutensis
- Navicula izsopallagae

=== J ===
- Navicula jacobii
- Navicula jacotiae
- Navicula jaernefeltioides
- Navicula jakkalsica
- Navicula jakovljevici
- Navicula jakovljevicii
- Navicula jamaicensis
- Navicula jasnitskii
- Navicula jasnitskyi
- Navicula jatobensis
- Navicula javanensis
- Navicula javanica
- Navicula jeffreyae
- Navicula jejuna
- Navicula jejunoides
- Navicula jejunoides
- Navicula jenneri
- Navicula jentzschii
- Navicula jequitinhonhae
- Navicula jessenii
- Navicula jimboi
- Navicula jogensis
- Navicula johanrossii
- Navicula johnsonii
- Navicula jonssoni
- Navicula jonssonii
- Navicula jordani
- Navicula josephi
- Navicula joubaudi
- Navicula joubaudii
- Navicula joursacensis
- Navicula jouseana
- Navicula juanitalinda
- Navicula juba
- Navicula jucunda
- Navicula jucunda
- Navicula jugata
- Navicula julieni
- Navicula jungi
- Navicula jungii
- Navicula jurassensis
- Navicula jurgensii
- Navicula jurilji

=== K ===
- Navicula kaapensis
- Navicula kaelfvensis
- Navicula kaikonkiensis
- Navicula kamorthensis
- Navicula kanemi
- Navicula kanitzii
- Navicula kantsiensis
- Navicula kappa
- Navicula karelica
- Navicula kariana
- Navicula karsia
- Navicula karstenii
- Navicula kawamurae
- Navicula kefvingensis
- Navicula kelleri
- Navicula kenon
- Navicula kenyae
- Navicula kepesii
- Navicula kerguelensis
- Navicula kernensis
- Navicula kertschiana
- Navicula kincaidii
- Navicula kinkeriana
- Navicula kinkerii
- Navicula kirchneriana
- Navicula kisber
- Navicula kittoniana
- Navicula kizakensis
- Navicula kjellmanii
- Navicula klavsenii
- Navicula kleerekoperi
- Navicula knysnensis
- Navicula knysnesis
- Navicula kochii
- Navicula koeiei
- Navicula kohlenbachii
- Navicula kohlmaieri
- Navicula kolbei
- Navicula kolentiensis
- Navicula kolugoensis
- Navicula koniamboensis
- Navicula konstantini
- Navicula korzeniewskii
- Navicula kossuthii
- Navicula kotschii
- Navicula kotschyana
- Navicula kotschyi
- Navicula kovalchookiana
- Navicula kpongensis
- Navicula krammerae
- Navicula krasskei
- Navicula krookii
- Navicula kryokonites
- Navicula kryophila
- Navicula kuetzingiana
- Navicula kuetzingii
- Navicula kuolensis
- Navicula kuripanensis
- Navicula kurzii
- Navicula kuseliana
- Navicula kutzingiana
- Navicula kuusamensis
- Navicula kuwaitiana
- Navicula kwamkuji
- Navicula laciniosa

=== L ===
- Navicula laciniosa
- Navicula lacrimans
- Navicula lacrymans
- Navicula lacuna
- Navicula lacunarum
- Navicula lacunicola
- Navicula lacus-karluki
- Navicula lacus-baicali
- Navicula lacus-lemani
- Navicula lacustris
- Navicula ladogensis
- Navicula laevimarginata
- Navicula laevis
- Navicula laevissima
- Navicula lagerheimii
- Navicula lagerstedti
- Navicula lagunae
- Navicula laingii
- Navicula lalia
- Navicula lambda
- Navicula lambertensis
- Navicula lamella
- Navicula lamii
- Navicula lampra
- Navicula lamprocampa
- Navicula lanceolata
- Navicula langoraensis
- Navicula lapidosa
- Navicula lapila
- Navicula lapsa
- Navicula lata
- Navicula latefasciata
- Navicula latelongitudinalis
- Navicula lateropunctata
- Navicula laterostrata
- Navicula latevittata
- Navicula laticeps
- Navicula latissima
- Navicula lauca
- Navicula lauta
- Navicula lawsonii
- Navicula le-tourneurii
- Navicula leboimei
- Navicula leemanniae
- Navicula lefevrei
- Navicula legumen
- Navicula lehmanniae
- Navicula leistikowii
- Navicula lemmermanni
- Navicula lemmermannii
- Navicula lenis
- Navicula lenoblei
- Navicula lenticula
- Navicula lenzi
- Navicula leonardi
- Navicula leonardii
- Navicula leonis
- Navicula lepida
- Navicula lepta
- Navicula leptoceros
- Navicula leptoloba
- Navicula leptorhynchus
- Navicula leptostigma
- Navicula leptostriata
- Navicula leptostylus
- Navicula leptotermia
- Navicula lesinensis
- Navicula lesothensis
- Navicula letulenta
- Navicula leudugeri
- Navicula levanderi
- Navicula leveillei
- Navicula levensis
- Navicula levis
- Navicula liaotungiensis
- Navicula libellus
- Navicula liber
- Navicula libonensis
- Navicula liburnica
- Navicula lignieri
- Navicula limanense
- Navicula limata
- Navicula limatoides
- Navicula limbata
- Navicula limicola
- Navicula limitanea
- Navicula limosa
- Navicula limpida
- Navicula lindae
- Navicula lineola
- Navicula lineostriata
- Navicula linter
- Navicula liostauron
- Navicula liouvillei
- Navicula lirata
- Navicula lithognatha
- Navicula lithognathoides
- Navicula litoris
- Navicula litos
- Navicula littoralis
- Navicula ljugneri
- Navicula ljungneri
- Navicula lobata
- Navicula loczyi
- Navicula lohmannii
- Navicula loibl-sittlerii
- Navicula lomastriata
- Navicula londonensis
- Navicula longa
- Navicula longi
- Navicula longicephala
- Navicula longifissa
- Navicula longirostris
- Navicula longistriata
- Navicula lorcana
- Navicula lorenzii
- Navicula lovenii
- Navicula loveridgei
- Navicula lubetii
- Navicula lucenoides
- Navicula lucentiformis
- Navicula luciae A.Witkowski
- Navicula luciana
- Navicula lucida
- Navicula lucidula
- Navicula lucifica
- Navicula ludloviana
- Navicula luisii
- Navicula lumbricastriata
- Navicula lumen
- Navicula lunata
- Navicula lunatapicalis
- Navicula lundii
- Navicula lundstroemii
- Navicula lunula
- Navicula lunulifera
- Navicula lunyacsekii
- Navicula lupula
- Navicula lurinda
- Navicula lusitanica
- Navicula lusoria
- Navicula luxoriensis
- Navicula luxuriosa
- Navicula luzonensis
- Navicula lybica
- Navicula lyra
- Navicula lyrans
- Navicula lyrella
- Navicula lyrigera
- Navicula lyroides

=== M ===
- Navicula macdonaghi
- Navicula macer
- Navicula maceria
- Navicula macilenta
- Navicula macraeana
- Navicula macrogongyla
- Navicula macromphala
- Navicula macropunctata
- Navicula macula
- Navicula maculata
- Navicula maculosa
- Navicula madagascarensis
- Navicula madagascariensis
- Navicula madeirensis
- Navicula madrae
- Navicula maeandriana
- Navicula maeandrinoides
- Navicula maendrina
- Navicula maeotica
- Navicula magapolitana
- Navicula magellanica
- Navicula magna
- Navicula magnifica
- Navicula maharashtrensis
- Navicula mahoodii
- Navicula maidanae
- Navicula major
- Navicula malacarae
- Navicula maliana
- Navicula malica
- Navicula malinvaudi
- Navicula malombensis
- Navicula malutiana
- Navicula mammalis
- Navicula manapiensis
- Navicula manginii
- Navicula manifesta
- Navicula mannii
- Navicula manokwariensis
- Navicula mansiensis
- Navicula mantichora
- Navicula manubialis
- Navicula mardansouensis
- Navicula margalithii
- Navicula margarita
- Navicula margaritacea
- Navicula margaritata
- Navicula margaritiana
- Navicula marginata
- Navicula marginestriata
- Navicula margino-nodularis
- Navicula margino-ornata
- Navicula marginulata
- Navicula maria
- Navicula mariagracielae
- Navicula mariposae
- Navicula marlieri
- Navicula marlierii
- Navicula marmorata
- Navicula marnieri
- Navicula marnierii
- Navicula martini
- Navicula martinii
- Navicula martyi
- Navicula mascarenae
- Navicula mastogloidea
- Navicula mauleri
- Navicula mauriciana
- Navicula maxima
- Navicula mayeri
- Navicula meadeensis
- Navicula meadensis
- Navicula mediacomplexa
- Navicula mediahelos
- Navicula medica
- Navicula medioconvexa
- Navicula mediocostata
- Navicula mediocriformis
- Navicula mediocris
- Navicula medioincrassata
- Navicula medioinflata
- Navicula mediopartita
- Navicula mediopunctata
- Navicula mediterranea
- Navicula megacuspidata
- Navicula megalodon
- Navicula megaloptera
- Navicula megapolitana
- Navicula megastauros
- Navicula meisteri
- Navicula meisterii
- Navicula melanesica
- Navicula melchersi
- Navicula meleagris
- Navicula menaiana
- Navicula menda
- Navicula mendica
- Navicula mengeae
- Navicula menilitica
- Navicula meniscoides
- Navicula menisculoides
- Navicula menisculus
- Navicula meniscus
- Navicula mentzii
- Navicula mereschkowskyi
- Navicula meridiepacifica
- Navicula meridionalis
- Navicula meridiorecens
- Navicula mersa
- Navicula mesogongyla
- Navicula mesolaia
- Navicula mesoleiae
- Navicula mesolepta
- Navicula mesopachya
- Navicula mexicana
- Navicula meyeri
- Navicula mica
- Navicula microcari
- Navicula microcephala
- Navicula microdicta
- Navicula microdigitoradiata
- Navicula microlyra
- Navicula micropupula
- Navicula microrhombus
- Navicula microrhynchus
- Navicula microstauron
- Navicula microstoma
- Navicula migma
- Navicula mikado
- Navicula mikrotatos
- Navicula millotiana
- Navicula millsi
- Navicula milthersii
- Navicula mimicans
- Navicula mimula
- Navicula mina
- Navicula minima
- Navicula miniscula
- Navicula minisculoides
- Navicula minnewaukonensis
- Navicula minor
- Navicula minthe
- Navicula mintracta
- Navicula minuscula
- Navicula minuta
- Navicula minutissima
- Navicula minutula
- Navicula mira
- Navicula mirabilis
- Navicula mirabunda
- Navicula miramaris
- Navicula mirifica
- Navicula misella
- Navicula misionera
- Navicula mobiliensis
- Navicula mocsarensis
- Navicula modesta
- Navicula modica
- Navicula moendrina
- Navicula moenofranconica
- Navicula moerckii
- Navicula moesta
- Navicula moesziana
- Navicula molesta
- Navicula mollicula
- Navicula mollis
- Navicula mollissima
- Navicula monela
- Navicula monile
- Navicula monilifera
- Navicula moniliformis
- Navicula monmouthiana
- Navicula monmouthianastodderi
- Navicula monodi
- Navicula monodon
- Navicula monradii
- Navicula montana
- Navicula montanestris
- Navicula montisatrae
- Navicula mooreana
- Navicula moorosiana
- Navicula moreii
- Navicula mormonorum
- Navicula morricei
- Navicula moscarensis
- Navicula moskalii
- Navicula mossbergensis
- Navicula mournei
- Navicula mucicola
- Navicula mucicoloides
- Navicula mucronula
- Navicula muelleri
- Navicula mugadensis
- Navicula mujibensis
- Navicula multicostata
- Navicula multicostata
- Navicula multigramme
- Navicula multiperla
- Navicula multiplex
- Navicula multiseriata
- Navicula multistriata
- Navicula muncki
- Navicula munckii
- Navicula munda
- Navicula muralibionta
- Navicula muraliformis
- Navicula muralis
- Navicula murrayi
- Navicula musca
- Navicula muscaeformis
- Navicula muscatinei
- Navicula muscerda
- Navicula muscosa
- Navicula mutabilis
- Navicula mutat
- Navicula mutica
- Navicula muticopsiforme
- Navicula muticopsis
- Navicula my

=== N ===
- Navicula nadjae
- Navicula namibica
- Navicula nanissima
- Navicula nansenii
- Navicula narinosa
- Navicula neglecta
- Navicula neglecta
- Navicula nemoris
- Navicula neomundana
- Navicula neoreversa
- Navicula neoventricosa
- Navicula nepouiana
- Navicula nevrovae
- Navicula niceaencis
- Navicula nienta
- Navicula nimbus
- Navicula nobilis
- Navicula norae
- Navicula nordenskioeldii
- Navicula normalis
- Navicula normaloides
- Navicula northumbrica
- Navicula notanda
- Navicula notha
- Navicula novae-guineaensis
- Navicula novaesiberica
- Navicula novasiberica
- Navicula nuda
- Navicula nugalis
- Navicula nungaensis

=== O ===
- Navicula oahuensis
- Navicula obesa
- Navicula objecta
- Navicula oblonga
- Navicula oblongata
- Navicula oblongiformis
- Navicula obtecta
- Navicula obtusangula
- Navicula ocalli
- Navicula octavosignata
- Navicula odiosa
- Navicula oerensis
- Navicula oetzvallensis
- Navicula ognjanovae
- Navicula ohiensis
- Navicula okunoi
- Navicula oliffi
- Navicula oligotraphenta
- Navicula onoensis
- Navicula opieorum
- Navicula opima
- Navicula opportuna
- Navicula oppugnata
- Navicula orangiana
- Navicula orbiculata
- Navicula orbis
- Navicula orvinii
- Navicula ostenfeldii
- Navicula ostrogothica
- Navicula ovalis
- Navicula ovata

=== P ===
- Navicula paanaensis
- Navicula paca
- Navicula pacardi
- Navicula pagophila
- Navicula palearctica
- Navicula pallescens
- Navicula palpebralis
- Navicula pampaeana
- Navicula papilioarea
- Navicula parabilis
- Navicula parablis
- Navicula parabryophila
- Navicula paracari
- Navicula parahasta
- Navicula paranipponica
- Navicula paraobesa
- Navicula parapontica
- Navicula parastriolata
- Navicula parasura
- Navicula paratunkae
- Navicula parca
- Navicula parenculoides
- Navicula pargemina
- Navicula parinacota
- Navicula parodia
- Navicula parvipenda
- Navicula parvula
- Navicula patula
- Navicula paucivisitata
- Navicula paulensis
- Navicula paul-schulzii
- Navicula paupercula
- Navicula pavillardi
- Navicula pavillardii
- Navicula pelagica
- Navicula peltoensis
- Navicula pennata
- Navicula peracuta
- Navicula peragalli
- Navicula peregrina
- Navicula peregrinopsis
- Navicula peripontica
- Navicula perlatoides
- Navicula perlepida
- Navicula permakarevichae
- Navicula perminuta
- Navicula perobesa
- Navicula peroblonga
- Navicula perotii
- Navicula perparva
- Navicula perpendicularis
- Navicula perpicea
- Navicula perrhombus
- Navicula perspicilliata
- Navicula perturbata
- Navicula petersenii
- Navicula peticolasii
- Navicula petrmarvanii
- Navicula petrovii
- Navicula petrovskae
- Navicula phyllepta
- Navicula phylleptosoma
- Navicula phylleptosomaformis
- Navicula picea
- Navicula piercei
- Navicula pierre-comperei
- Navicula pinna
- Navicula pinnata
- Navicula planiceps
- Navicula planmembranacea
- Navicula platalea
- Navicula platensis
- Navicula plathii
- Navicula platycephala
- Navicula platystoma
- Navicula platyventris
- Navicula pletura
- Navicula podolica
- Navicula podzorskii
- Navicula polae
- Navicula polysticta
- Navicula ponticulus
- Navicula poretzkiae
- Navicula porifera
- Navicula porta-aurata
- Navicula portomontana
- Navicula potzgeri
- Navicula praeterita
- Navicula pragma
- Navicula prespanensis
- Navicula prinslooii
- Navicula producta
- Navicula psendoacceptata
- Navicula pseudislandica
- Navicula pseudoanglica
- Navicula pseudoannulata
- Navicula pseudoantonii
- Navicula pseudoarvensis
- Navicula pseudobrasiliana
- Navicula pseudobrebissonii
- Navicula pseudobryophila
- Navicula pseudocarinifera
- Navicula pseudoclamans
- Navicula pseudoclavata
- Navicula pseudoclementis
- Navicula pseudoconcamerata
- Navicula pseudocryptocephala
- Navicula pseudodemerarae
- Navicula pseudofaceta
- Navicula pseudofossalis
- Navicula pseudofrickia
- Navicula pseudofrugalis
- Navicula pseudoglacialis
- Navicula pseudogrimmei
- Navicula pseudohasta
- Navicula pseudohastata
- Navicula pseudohumilis
- Navicula pseudojacobii
- Navicula pseudokryokonites
- Navicula pseudolagerheimii
- Navicula pseudolanceolata
- Navicula pseudolinearis
- Navicula pseudolitoricola
- Navicula pseudolucidula
- Navicula pseudomenisculus
- Navicula pseudoorthoneoides
- Navicula pseudopalpebralis
- Navicula pseudopelliculosa
- Navicula pseudoppugnata
- Navicula pseudoreinhardtii
- Navicula pseudosalinarioides
- Navicula pseudo-schoenfeldii
- Navicula pseudosilicula
- Navicula pseudostrearia
- Navicula pseudostundii
- Navicula pseudotenelloides
- Navicula pseudotenelloides
- Navicula pseudotenelloides
- Navicula pseudothienemannii
- Navicula pulchripora
- Navicula pungens
- Navicula pusilloides

=== Q-R ===
- Navicula quadrisinuata
- Navicula quadriundulata
- Navicula quasidisjuncta
- Navicula quaternaria
- Navicula quechua
- Navicula quincunx
- Navicula quinquenodis
- Navicula radians
- Navicula radiopunctata
- Navicula radiosa
- Navicula radiosafallax
- Navicula radiosiola
- Navicula radiostriata
- Navicula rainierensis
- Navicula rajmundii
- Navicula rakowskae
- Navicula ramosissima
- Navicula raphoneis
- Navicula ravinae
- Navicula recava
- Navicula recens
- Navicula recognita
- Navicula recondita
- Navicula rectiformis
- Navicula rectum
- Navicula regata
- Navicula regelli
- Navicula regressa
- Navicula reichardtiana
- Navicula reimeri
- Navicula reinhardtii
- Navicula reinickeana
- Navicula reissii
- Navicula relicta
- Navicula resecta
- Navicula restitua
- Navicula restituta
- Navicula retusa
- Navicula rhodana
- Navicula rhombica
- Navicula rhynchocephala
- Navicula rhynchotella
- Navicula ricardae
- Navicula ricardii
- Navicula ridelii
- Navicula riediana
- Navicula riotecensis
- Navicula rivalis
- Navicula rivularis
- Navicula rivulorum
- Navicula rogalli
- Navicula rolandii
- Navicula rossii
- Navicula rotaeana
- Navicula rotaena
- Navicula rotula
- Navicula ruga
- Navicula rumaniensis
- Navicula rusticensis

=== S ===
- Navicula sabae
- Navicula sabiniana
- Navicula sarcophagus
- Navicula sagitta
- Navicula salinarum
- Navicula salinicola
- Navicula sanctacrux
- Navicula sanctaecrucis
- Navicula sancti-naumii
- Navicula sandegrinii
- Navicula sansegana
- Navicula sarolata
- Navicula saugerii
- Navicula savannahiana
- Navicula scalifera
- Navicula scandinavica
- Navicula scaniae
- Navicula schadei
- Navicula schaeferi
- Navicula schassmanii
- Navicula schassmannii
- Navicula schefterae
- Navicula schmassmannii
- Navicula schmidtii
- Navicula schonfeldii
- Navicula schonkenii
- Navicula schroeteri
- Navicula schubartii
- Navicula schultzei
- Navicula schwabei
- Navicula schweigeri
- Navicula scirpus
- Navicula scoliopleuroides
- Navicula scoresbyi
- Navicula scotica
- Navicula scutelloides
- Navicula scutum
- Navicula seductilis
- Navicula seibigiana
- Navicula seibigii
- Navicula seippiana
- Navicula sejuncta
- Navicula semen
- Navicula semenicula
- Navicula semenoides
- Navicula semiaperta
- Navicula semiarea
- Navicula semihyalina
- Navicula seminoides
- Navicula seminuloides
- Navicula semivirgata
- Navicula senegalensis
- Navicula septaeoides
- Navicula septenaria
- Navicula septentrionalis
- Navicula sequens
- Navicula serdicensis
- Navicula serotina
- Navicula shanwangensis
- Navicula shiloi
- Navicula siamexilis
- Navicula siamlinearis
- Navicula sibirica
- Navicula sieminskiae
- Navicula sigma
- Navicula silenda
- Navicula silens
- Navicula simplex
- Navicula simplexoides
- Navicula simula
- Navicula simulans
- Navicula singularis
- Navicula siofokensis
- Navicula sjoersii
- Navicula skabitchewskyayae
- Navicula skabitschewskyi
- Navicula skiftei
- Navicula skuae
- Navicula slesvicensis
- Navicula slesvicensus
- Navicula smeerenburgensis
- Navicula smithii
- Navicula söhrensis
- Navicula solaris
- Navicula solida
- Navicula sorella
- Navicula sovereignae
- Navicula sovereignii
- Navicula spartinetensis
- Navicula sphaerophora
- Navicula spirata
- Navicula splendicula
- Navicula sponsa
- Navicula spuria
- Navicula stachurae
- Navicula staffordiae
- Navicula stankovicii
- Navicula starmachii
- Navicula starmachioides
- Navicula staurifera
- Navicula stercumuscarum
- Navicula stigmatifera
- Navicula stoermeri
- Navicula strangulata
- Navicula streckerae
- Navicula strelnikovae
- Navicula strenzkii
- Navicula striolata
- Navicula structa
- Navicula stuxbergii
- Navicula subacuta
- Navicula subadnata
- Navicula subajajensis
- Navicula subalpina
- Navicula sub-bacillum
- Navicula subbotnica
- Navicula subbottnica
- Navicula subcancellata
- Navicula subclementis
- Navicula subconcentrica
- Navicula subdelicata
- Navicula subelata
- Navicula subfasciata
- Navicula subfortis
- Navicula subfossalis
- Navicula subfraudulenta
- Navicula subfrigidicola
- Navicula subgastriformis
- Navicula subgrimmei
- Navicula subhasta
- Navicula subhastatula
- Navicula subhexagona
- Navicula subinflatoides
- Navicula sublanceolata
- Navicula subnympharum
- Navicula subocculata
- Navicula subocculta
- Navicula subplacentula
- Navicula subretusa
- Navicula subrhynchocephala
- Navicula subrotundata
- Navicula subsulcata
- Navicula subtrophicatrix
- Navicula subviridula
- Navicula sudora
- Navicula suecicarum
- Navicula supergregaria
- Navicula superhasta
- Navicula supleeorum
- Navicula supralitoralis
- Navicula suprinii
- Navicula suriana
- Navicula surinamensis
- Navicula suspica
- Navicula sverdrupii
- Navicula swaniana
- Navicula symmetrica
- Navicula syvertsenii
- Navicula szlachetkoi

=== T ===
- Navicula taedens
- Navicula tairuaensis
- Navicula tamnaeana
- Navicula tanakae
- Navicula tantula
- Navicula taylorii
- Navicula temniskovae
- Navicula tenelloides
- Navicula tenuicephala
- Navicula tenuipunctata
- Navicula tenuis (now Adlafia tenuis
- Navicula termes
- Navicula terricola
- Navicula tersa
- Navicula testa
- Navicula testata
- Navicula texana
- Navicula theelii
- Navicula theinemannii
- Navicula thienemannii
- Navicula thiennemanii
- Navicula thoroddsenii
- Navicula tibetica
- Navicula toba
- Navicula torellii
- Navicula torganae
- Navicula torneensis
- Navicula toulaae
- Navicula toxa
- Navicula tracery
- Navicula tranciloba
- Navicula transistantioides
- Navicula transitans
- Navicula tranversa
- Navicula traucilola
- Navicula triconfusa
- Navicula tridentula
- Navicula trigonocephala
- Navicula trilatera
- Navicula triumvirorum
- Navicula trivialis
- Navicula trochus
- Navicula trophicatrix
- Navicula tropicoidea
- Navicula tsetsegmaae
- Navicula tubulosa
- Navicula turris
- Navicula tuulensis
- Navicula tuzoni
- Navicula twymania
- Navicula twymanniana

=== U-V ===
- Navicula udintsevii
- Navicula ultratenelloides
- Navicula umbra
- Navicula umkantziensis
- Navicula undosa
- Navicula undulata
- Navicula undulata
- Navicula unilaterarea
- Navicula uniseriata
- Navicula usoltsevae
- Navicula utermoehlii
- Navicula utlandshoerniensis
- Navicula vacillans
- Navicula vahlii
- Navicula valdestriata
- Navicula valdicostata
- Navicula valeriana
- Navicula validicostata
- Navicula vandamii
- Navicula vaneei
- Navicula vanei
- Navicula vanhoeffenii
- Navicula vanmeeli
- Navicula vara
- Navicula varians
- Navicula variolinea
- Navicula vaupelli
- Navicula vekhovii
- Navicula venerablis
- Navicula venetiformis
- Navicula venetoides
- Navicula ventricosa
- Navicula verecundoides
- Navicula vetita
- Navicula vicina
- Navicula vilaplanii
- Navicula viminea
- Navicula virgata
- Navicula viridis
- Navicula viridis
- Navicula viridula
- Navicula viridulacalcis
- Navicula virihensis
- Navicula virosa
- Navicula vixcylindrata
- Navicula vula
- Navicula vulpina

=== W-Z ===
- Navicula waernensis
- Navicula walkeri
- Navicula wardii
- Navicula wasmundii
- Navicula weberi
- Navicula wendlingii
- Navicula wetzelii
- Navicula whitefishensis
- Navicula wiesneri
- Navicula wilczekii
- Navicula wildii
- Navicula willisiae
- Navicula winona
- Navicula wisei
- Navicula woltereckii
- Navicula worochinii
- Navicula wrightii
- Navicula wulfii
- Navicula wunsamiae
- Navicula wygaschii
- Navicula yaarensis
- Navicula zachariasii
- Navicula zanonii
- Navicula zeta
- Navicula zichyi
- Navicula zohdyi
- Navicula zostereti
- Navicula zsivnyana
