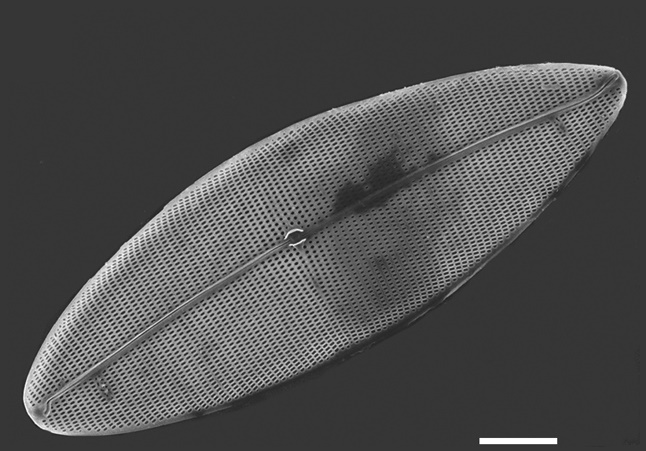
- SEM image of P. pacificum

Scientific classification
- Domain: Eukaryota
- Clade: Sar
- Clade: Stramenopiles
- Division: Ochrophyta
- Clade: Diatomeae
- Class: Bacillariophyceae
- Order: Naviculales
- Family: Pleurosigmataceae
- Genus: Pleurosigma
- Species: P. pacificum

Binomial name
- Pleurosigma pacificum Fei-Chao Du, Yu-Hang Li & Kui-Dong Xu, 2023

Type strain
- MBMCAS286904 (Marine Biological Museum, Chinese Academy of Sciences)

= Pleurosigma pacificum =

Species of diatom

Pleurosigma pacificum is a species of planktonic diatom discovered in the tropical Western Pacific Ocean.

== Morphology ==
Pleurosigma pacificum is a naviculoid diatom, a type of photosynthetic protist (or alga) that is similar in shape to those of the genus Navicula, said to be shaped like a boat. In particular, naviculoid diatoms of the genus Pleurosigma usually have a sigmoid valve or raphe, in the shape of a sigmoid function or the letter S. The species P. pacificum is characterized by lanceolate valves, around 45.0–51.1 μm long and 13.0–15.6 μm wide, that taper gradually towards subacute ends. Their raphe is straight, filiform, slightly curved near the poles. The center of the valve is round, while the terminal area is shaped like a funnel.

== Ecology ==
Pleurosigma pacificum is a planktonic unicellular alga known only from its type location, in the Pacific Ocean.

== Systematics ==
Type locality of P. pacificum in the Pacific Ocean.

Pleurosigma pacificum was isolated from the tropical Western Pacific Ocean, hence its name "pacificum". Cells were obtained from phytoplankton samples collected from the upper 200 meter water column. Its morphology was studied through light microscopy and electron microscopy. Its DNA was sequenced and, through phylogenetic analyses based on two genes, SSU rDNA and rbcL, its taxonomic position within the genus Pleurosigma was confirmed. The species was described by researchers Fei-Chao Du, Yu-Hang Li and Kui-Dong Xu of the Chinese Academy of Sciences. The results were published in the journal PhytoKeys in 2023.
