= Navicula dobrinatemniskovae =

Scientific classification
- Domain: Eukaryota
- Clade: Diaphoretickes
- Clade: Sar
- Clade: Stramenopiles
- Phylum: Gyrista
- Subphylum: Ochrophytina
- Class: Bacillariophyceae
- Order: Naviculales
- Family: Naviculaceae
- Genus: Navicula
- Species: N. dobrinatemniskovae

Binomial name
- Navicula dobrinatemniskovae Van de Vijver et al., 2011

Species of single-celled organism

Navicula dobrinatemniskovae is an algal species in the genus Navicula, known from inland waters of the Antarctic region. The species was named after Prof. Dsc Dobrina Temniskova from the University of Sofia
