= Navicula baardsethii =

Scientific classification
- Domain: Eukaryota
- Clade: Diaphoretickes
- Clade: Sar
- Clade: Stramenopiles
- Phylum: Gyrista
- Subphylum: Ochrophytina
- Class: Bacillariophyceae
- Order: Naviculales
- Family: Naviculaceae
- Genus: Navicula
- Species: N. baardsethii

Binomial name
- Navicula baardsethii Cleve-Euler 1949

Species of diatom

Navicula baardsethii is a species of algae in the genus Navicula.
