= Navicula alaskana =

Scientific classification
- Domain: Eukaryota
- Clade: Diaphoretickes
- Clade: SAR
- Clade: Stramenopiles
- Phylum: Gyrista
- Subphylum: Ochrophytina
- Class: Bacillariophyceae
- Order: Naviculales
- Family: Naviculaceae
- Genus: Navicula
- Species: N. alaskana

Binomial name
- Navicula alaskana Patrick & Freese 1961

Subspecies
- Navicula crucicula var. alaskana

Species of single-celled organism

Navicula alaskana is a species of algae in the genus Navicula which occurs in Northern Alaska.
