= Navicula aleksandrae =

Scientific classification
- Domain: Eukaryota
- Clade: Diaphoretickes
- Clade: SAR
- Clade: Stramenopiles
- Phylum: Gyrista
- Subphylum: Ochrophytina
- Class: Bacillariophyceae
- Order: Naviculales
- Family: Naviculaceae
- Genus: Navicula
- Species: N. aleksandrae

Binomial name
- Navicula aleksandrae Lange-Bertalot, Bogaczewicz-Adamczak et Witkowski 2003

Species of single-celled organism

Navicula aleksandrae is a species of algae in the genus Navicula which is found near the Baltic Sea.
