= Navicula elegans =

Scientific classification
- Domain: Eukaryota
- Clade: Diaphoretickes
- Clade: Sar
- Clade: Stramenopiles
- Phylum: Gyrista
- Subphylum: Ochrophytina
- Class: Bacillariophyceae
- Order: Naviculales
- Family: Naviculaceae
- Genus: Navicula
- Species: N. elegans

Binomial name
- Navicula elegans (W.Smith 1853) K.Krammer, 1992

Varieties and forms
- Navicula elegans f. crowbillensis; Navicula elegans var. cuspidata

Synonyms
- Pinnunavis elegans

Species of single-celled organism

Navicula elegans is a marine and freshwater species of algae of the genus of Navicula.
