= Navicula adamata =

Scientific classification
- Domain: Eukaryota
- Clade: Diaphoretickes
- Clade: SAR
- Clade: Stramenopiles
- Phylum: Gyrista
- Subphylum: Ochrophytina
- Class: Bacillariophyceae
- Order: Naviculales
- Family: Naviculaceae
- Genus: Navicula
- Species: N. adamata

Binomial name
- Navicula adamata M.D. Guiry, 2006

Species of single-celled organism

Navicula adamata is a species of algae in the genus Navicula.
