= Navicula alea =

Scientific classification
- Domain: Eukaryota
- Clade: Diaphoretickes
- Clade: Sar
- Clade: Stramenopiles
- Phylum: Gyrista
- Subphylum: Ochrophytina
- Class: Bacillariophyceae
- Order: Naviculales
- Family: Naviculaceae
- Genus: Navicula
- Species: N. alea

Binomial name
- Navicula alea M.H.Hohn & Hellerman 1963

Species of single-celled organism

Navicula alea is a species of algae in the genus Navicula which occurs in North American rivers.
