= Navicula bita =

Scientific classification
- Domain: Eukaryota
- Clade: Diaphoretickes
- Clade: Sar
- Clade: Stramenopiles
- Phylum: Gyrista
- Subphylum: Ochrophytina
- Class: Bacillariophyceae
- Order: Naviculales
- Family: Naviculaceae
- Genus: Navicula
- Species: N. bita

Binomial name
- Navicula bita Hohn 1961

Species of single-celled organism

Navicula bita is a freshwater species of algae in the genus Navicula.
