= Navicula conveyi =

Scientific classification
- Domain: Eukaryota
- Clade: Diaphoretickes
- Clade: Sar
- Clade: Stramenopiles
- Phylum: Gyrista
- Subphylum: Ochrophytina
- Class: Bacillariophyceae
- Order: Naviculales
- Family: Naviculaceae
- Genus: Navicula
- Species: N. conveyi

Binomial name
- Navicula conveyi Van de Vijver et al., 2011

Species of single-celled organism

Navicula conveyi is an algae in the genus Navicula, known from inland waters of the Antarctic and Sub-Antarctic regions.
