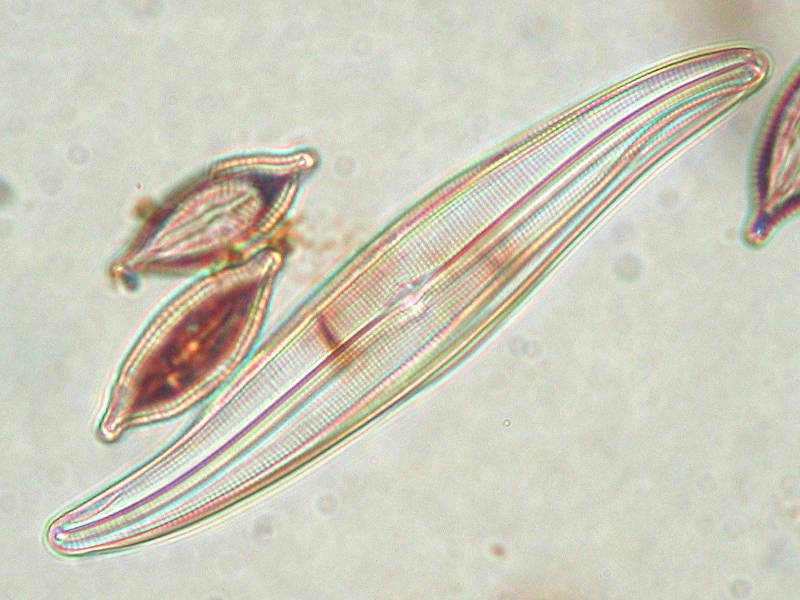
- Gyrosigma acuminatum

Scientific classification
- Domain: Eukaryota
- Clade: Sar
- Clade: Stramenopiles
- Division: Ochrophyta
- Clade: Bacillariophyta
- Class: Bacillariophyceae
- Order: Naviculales
- Family: Pleurosigmataceae
- Genus: Gyrosigma; A.H.Hassall, 1845

= Gyrosigma =

Genus of algae

Gyrosigma is a genus of diatoms belonging to the family Pleurosigmataceae.

The genus has a cosmopolitan distribution.

Like other diatoms, Gyrosigma has a siliceous cell wall called a frustule. The frustule is composed of two sections called valves, with one valve fitting inside the other valve similar to the two halves of a Petri dish. Gyrosigma has valves with a central slit called a raphe, a structure that allows movement of these diatoms.

The valves of Gyrosigma are sigmoid in outline, as well as the raphe. Striations could be parallel or perpendicular to the raphe. This contrasts to a similar genus Pleurosigma, which has striations that lie diagonally to the raphe.

== Species ==
Species:

- Gyrosigma acuminatum (Kützing) Rabenhorst, 1853
- Gyrosigma aestuarium Kisselev, 1925
- Gyrosigma algoris J.R.Carter, 1981
- Gyrosigma angulatum (Quekett) Griffith & Henfrey
- Gyrosigma apula Rabenhorst, 1853
- Gyrosigma arcticum (Cleve) Cleve, 1894
- Gyrosigma attenuatum (Kützing) Rabenhorst, 1853
- Gyrosigma baculum W.E.Herwig & F.A.S.Sterrenburg, 2014
- Gyrosigma baicalense
- Gyrosigma baikalensis Skvortzov, 1937
- Gyrosigma balticum (Ehrenberg) Rabenhorst, 1853
- Gyrosigma beaufortianum Hustedt, 1955
- Gyrosigma bhusavalensis Sarode & Kamat, 1984
- Gyrosigma bigibbum Zanon, 1949
- Gyrosigma caffra Giffen, 1963
- Gyrosigma calaritanum Zanon, 1948
- Gyrosigma cali G.Reid, 2003
- Gyrosigma centropunctatum Yuhang Li, Nagumo & Kuidong Xu, 2020
- Gyrosigma coelophilum Okamoto & Nagumo, 2003
- Gyrosigma compactum (Greville) Cleve, 1894
- Gyrosigma constrictum Volkov, 1936
- Gyrosigma contortum Mereschkowsky, 1902
- Gyrosigma crassum Meister, 1934
- Gyrosigma curtum E.Reichardt, 2020
- Gyrosigma curvulum Rabenhorst, 1853
- Gyrosigma cuspidata Rabenhorst, 1853
- Gyrosigma diaphanum Cleve, 1894
- Gyrosigma diminutum (W.Smith) Cleve
- Gyrosigma dissimilis Y.A.Mikishin, 1991
- Gyrosigma distortoides Manguin, 1952
- Gyrosigma diversitatum Giffen, 1970
- Gyrosigma dongzhaiense Yuhang Li, Nagumo & Kuidong Xu, 2020
- Gyrosigma dubia Rabenhorst, 1853
- Gyrosigma dubium Meister, 1934
