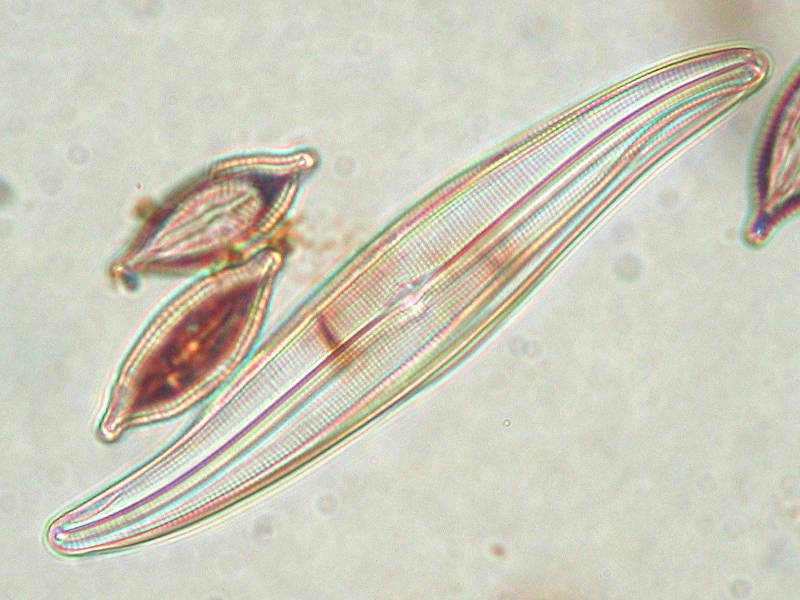

Scientific classification
- Domain: Eukaryota
- Clade: Sar
- Clade: Stramenopiles
- Division: Ochrophyta
- Clade: Bacillariophyta
- Class: Bacillariophyceae
- Order: Naviculales
- Family: Pleurosigmataceae
- Genus: Gyrosigma
- Species: G. acuminatum

Binomial name
- Gyrosigma acuminatum (Kützing) Rabenhorst, 1853

= Gyrosigma acuminatum =

Species of diatom

Gyrosigma acuminatum is a species of diatom in the genus Gyrosigma. The species was found in several different locations in Dickinson County, Iowa.

== Description ==
Gyrosigma acuminatum ranges from 77-153 μm in length and is typically 11-18 μm wide. It has distinct striae, with 16 to 18 transverse striae or 17-20 longitudinal striae in 10 micrometers. It is a pennate diatom.

== Distribution ==
The species is believed to be globally distributed in freshwater and has been observed in Europe, the United States, New Zealand, and South Africa.

== Habitat ==
Gyrosigma acuminatum lives in freshwater environments but has also been found in brackish water.
