= Navicula cari =

Scientific classification
- Domain: Eukaryota
- Clade: Diaphoretickes
- Clade: Sar
- Clade: Stramenopiles
- Phylum: Gyrista
- Subphylum: Ochrophytina
- Class: Bacillariophyceae
- Order: Naviculales
- Family: Naviculaceae
- Genus: Navicula
- Species: N. cari

Binomial name
- Navicula cari Ehrenberg 1836

Varieties
- Navicula cari var. cincta Navicula cari var. angusta Navicula cari var. divergentissima Navicula cari var. linearis Rosalee Navicula cari var. recens

Synonyms
- Navicula cari f. minor

Species of single-celled organism

Navicula cari is a species of algae in the genus Navicula. Navicula cari occur in eutrophic waters.
