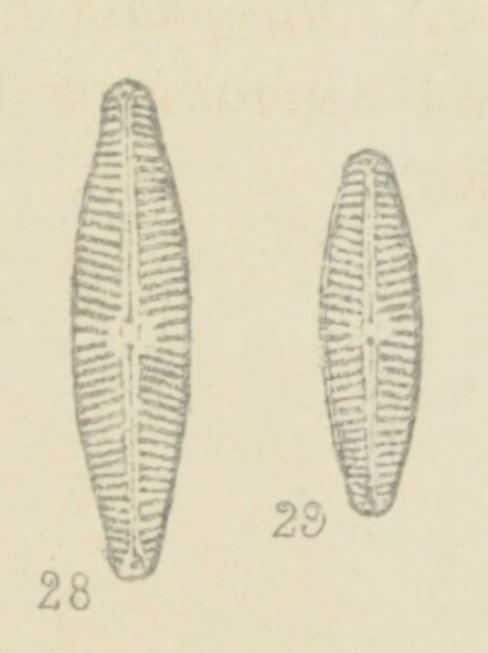
- Original sketches by A. Grunow of Navicula slesvicensis (originally Navicula viridula var. slesvicensis) in Van Heurck 1880

Scientific classification
- Domain: Eukaryota
- Clade: Diaphoretickes
- Clade: SAR
- Clade: Stramenopiles
- Phylum: Gyrista
- Subphylum: Ochrophytina
- Class: Bacillariophyceae
- Order: Naviculales
- Family: Naviculaceae
- Genus: Navicula
- Species: N. slesvicensis

Binomial name
- Navicula slesvicensis Grunow 1880

= Navicula slesvicensis =

Species of single-celled organism

Navicula slesvicensis is a species of algae in the genus Navicula found in electrolyte-rich freshwaters, estuaries, and coastal waters. It was originally described in 1880 and has since been reported on all continents except Antarctica, and in the Arctic.
