= Navicula caddoensis =

Scientific classification
- Domain: Eukaryota
- Clade: Diaphoretickes
- Clade: Sar
- Clade: Stramenopiles
- Phylum: Ochrophyta
- Clade: Diatomeae
- Class: Bacillariophyceae
- Order: Naviculales
- Family: Naviculaceae
- Genus: Navicula
- Species: †N. caddoensis

Binomial name
- †Navicula caddoensis Bond 1968

Species of single-celled organism

Navicula caddoensis is a fossil species of algae in the genus Navicula. Navicula caddoensis is extinct.
