= Cosmioneis =

Scientific classification
- Domain: Eukaryota
- Clade: Diaphoretickes
- Clade: SAR
- Clade: Stramenopiles
- Phylum: Gyrista
- Subphylum: Ochrophytina
- Class: Bacillariophyceae
- Order: Naviculales
- Family: Cosmioneidaceae
- Genus: Cosmioneis; D.G.Mann & Stickle, 1990

Genus of diatoms

Cosmioneis is a genus of diatoms belonging to the family Cosmioneidaceae.

Species:

- Cosmioneis brasiliana (Cleve) C.E.Wetzel & Ector
- Cosmioneis capitata (Hustedt) Lange-Bertalot
- Cosmioneis citriformis R.L.Lowe & A.R.Sherwood
