= Arcuatasigma =

Scientific classification
- Domain: Eukaryota
- Clade: Diaphoretickes
- Clade: Sar
- Clade: Stramenopiles
- Phylum: Gyrista
- Subphylum: Ochrophytina
- Class: Bacillariophyceae
- Order: Naviculales
- Family: Pleurosigmataceae
- Genus: Arcuatasigma; G.Reid

Genus of diatoms

Arcuatasigma is a genus of diatoms belonging to the family Pleurosigmataceae.

The genus is characterized by striae, both longitudinal and transapical, and a 180 degree twist in the frustule.

== Species ==
Accepted species:

- Arcuatasigma addu G.Reid, 2012
- Arcuatasigma arenicolum Lobban, 2018
- Arcuatasigma belizense G.Reid, 2018
- Arcuatasigma castracanense G.Reid, 2012
- Arcuatasigma closterioides (Grunow) G.Reid, 2012
- Arcuatasigma marginale Lobban, 2018
