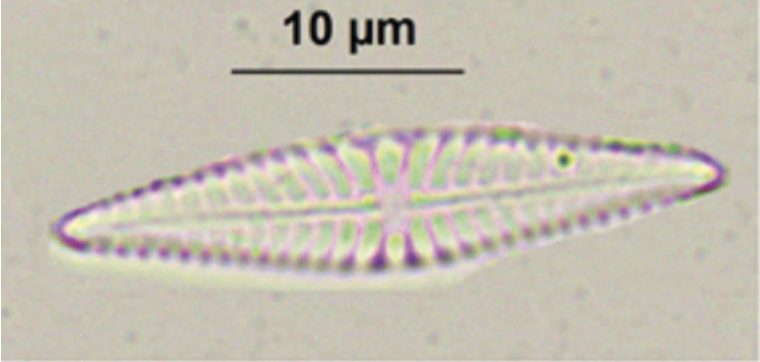
- Hippodonta jakubii

Scientific classification
- Domain: Eukaryota
- Clade: Sar
- Clade: Stramenopiles
- Division: Ochrophyta
- Clade: Bacillariophyta
- Class: Bacillariophyceae
- Order: Naviculales
- Family: Naviculaceae
- Genus: Hippodonta; H.Lange-Bertalot, A.Witkowski & D.Metzeltin, 1996

= Hippodonta =

Genus of diatoms

Hippodonta is a genus of diatoms belonging to the family Naviculaceae. There have been Hippodonta specimens found in the fossil record.

The genus has cosmopolitan distribution, and have been found in ancient lakes around the world.

== Species ==
This genus contains the following species:

- Hippodonta abunda A.Pavlov, Z.Levkov, D.M.Williams & M.Edlund, 2013
- Hippodonta acus M.S.Kulikovskiy, Metzeltin & Lange-Bert., 2012
- Hippodonta acuta A.Pavlov, Z.Levkov, D.M.Williams & M.Edlund, 2013
- Hippodonta affinis A.Pavlov, Z.Levkov, D.M.Williams & M.Edlund, 2013
- Hippodonta angustata A.Pavlov, Z.Levkov, D.M.Williams & M.Edlund, 2013
- Hippodonta avittatiformis A.Pavlov, Z.Levkov, D.M.Williams & M.Edlund, 2013
- Hippodonta baicalocostulata M.S.Kulikovskiy, Lange-Bert. & Metzeltin, 2012
- Hippodonta baicalorostrata Metzeltin, M.S.Kulikovskiy & Lange-Bert., 2012
- Hippodonta capitata Lange-Bert., Metzeltin and Witkowski, 1996
- Hippodonta certa A.Pavlov, Z.Levkov, D.M.Williams & M.Edlund, 2013
- Hippodonta cocquytiae A.Pavlov, Z.Levkov, D.M.Williams & M.Edlund, 2013
- Hippodonta communis A.Pavlov, Z.Levkov, D.M.Williams & M.Edlund, 2013
- Hippodonta conspicua A.Pavlov, Z.Levkov, D.M.Williams & M.Edlund, 2013
- Hippodonta costulatiformis A.Pavlov, Z.Levkov, D.M.Williams & M.Edlund, 2013
- Hippodonta coxiae Lange-Bert. 2001
- Hippodonta crassa A.Pavlov, Z.Levkov, D.M.Williams & M.Edlund, 2013
- Hippodonta dulcis M.Potapova, 2013
- Hippodonta elegans H.Lange-Bertalot, M.S.Kulikovskiy & D.Metzeltin, 2012
- Hippodonta exigua A.Pavlov, Z.Levkov, D.M.Williams & M.Edlund, 2013
- Hippodonta gravistriata Potapova, 2013
- Hippodonta humboldtiana A.Pavlov, Z.Levkov, D.M.Williams & M.Edlund, 2013
- Hippodonta hungarica Lange-Bert., Metzeltin and Witkowski 1996
- Hippodonta jakubii M.S.Kulikovskiy, H.Lange-Bertalot & D.Metzeltin, 2012
- Hippodonta khursevichiae M.S.Kulikovskiy, H.Lange-Bertalot & D.Metzeltin, 2012
- Hippodonta kornevae M.S.Kulikovskiy, Lange-Bert. & Metzeltin in Kulikovskiy et al., 2012
- Hippodonta lange-bertalotii B.Van de Vijver, G.Mataloni & A.Vinocur, 2012
- Hippodonta latelanceolata A.Pavlov, Z.Levkov, D.M.Williams & M.Edlund, 2013
- Hippodonta luneburgensis (Grunow) Lange-Bertalot, D.Metzeltin & A.Witkowski
- Hippodonta media A.Pavlov, Z.Levkov, D.M.Williams & M.Edlund, 2013
- Hippodonta minuta A.Pavlov, Z.Levkov, D.M.Williams & M.Edlund, 2013
- Hippodonta naviculiformis A.Pavlov, Z.Levkov, D.M.Williams & M.Edlund, 2013
- Hippodonta pseudacceptata Lange-Bert. 1996
- Hippodonta pulchra A.Pavlov, Z.Levkov, D.M.Williams & M.Edlund, 2013
- Hippodonta radiata A.Pavlov, Z.Levkov, D.M.Williams & M.Edlund, 2013
- Hippodonta rostratoides A.Pavlov, Z.Levkov, D.M.Williams & M.Edlund, 2013
- Hippodonta subrostrata A.Pavlov, Z.Levkov, D.M.Williams & M.Edlund, 2013
- Hippodonta yunetayakhiensis Genkal & Yarushina
