= Carinasigma =

Scientific classification
- Domain: Eukaryota
- Clade: Diaphoretickes
- Clade: Sar
- Clade: Stramenopiles
- Phylum: Gyrista
- Subphylum: Ochrophytina
- Class: Bacillariophyceae
- Order: Naviculales
- Family: Pleurosigmataceae
- Genus: Carinasigma; G.Reid

Genus of diatoms

Carinasigma is a genus of diatoms belonging to the family Pleurosigmataceae.

== Species ==
Accepted Species:

- Carinasigma angustatum (Donkin) G. Reid, 2012
- Carinasigma latum (E.J. Cox) G. Reid, 2012
- Carinasigma rectum (Donkin) G. Reid, 2012
