= Chamaepinnularia =

Scientific classification
- Domain: Eukaryota
- Clade: Diaphoretickes
- Clade: SAR
- Clade: Stramenopiles
- Phylum: Gyrista
- Subphylum: Ochrophytina
- Class: Bacillariophyceae
- Order: Naviculales
- Family: Naviculaceae
- Genus: Chamaepinnularia; Lange-Bertalot & Krammer, 1996

Genus of diatoms

Chamaepinnularia is a genus of diatoms belonging to the family Naviculaceae.

Species:

- Chamaepinnularia abdita Metzeltin & Lange-Bertalot
- Chamaepinnularia aerophila Van de Vijver & Beyens
- Chamaepinnularia alexandrowiczii Witkowski, Lange-Bertalot & Metzeltin
