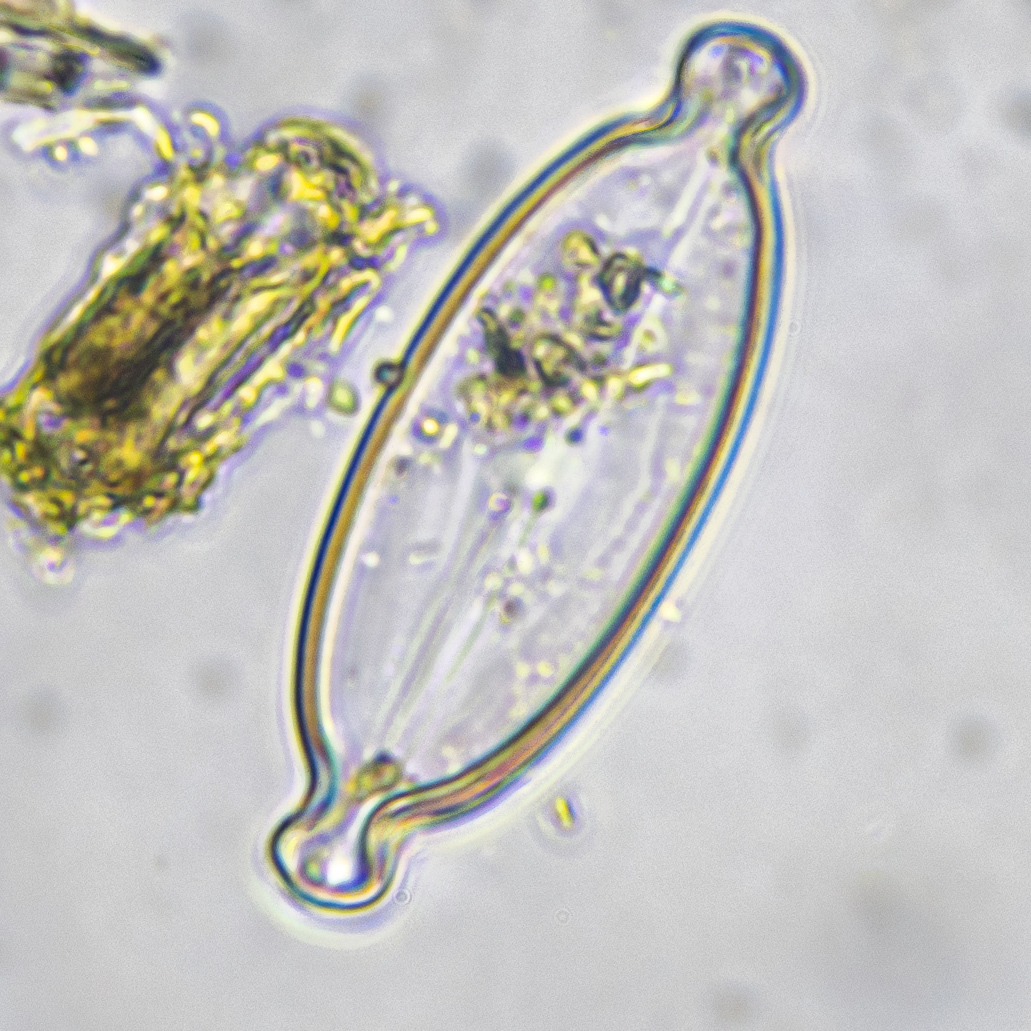
- Caloneis amphisbaena

Scientific classification
- Domain: Eukaryota
- Clade: Diaphoretickes
- Clade: Sar
- Clade: Stramenopiles
- Phylum: Gyrista
- Subphylum: Ochrophytina
- Class: Bacillariophyceae
- Order: Naviculales
- Family: Naviculaceae
- Genus: Caloneis; Cleve, 1894

= Caloneis =

Genus of diatoms

Caloneis is a genus of diatoms belonging to the family Naviculaceae.

Species:

- Caloneis abnormis (Grunow) Cleve
- Caloneis absoluta Manguin
- Caloneis achnanthiformis A.Cleve
- Caloneis africana (Giffen) Stidolph
- Caloneis fusioides (Grunow) Heiden & Kolbe, previously known as "Navicula fusioides"
- Caloneis schumanniana (Grunow) Cleve
