= Pulchella =

Scientific classification
- Domain: Eukaryota
- Clade: Diaphoretickes
- Clade: SAR
- Clade: Stramenopiles
- Phylum: Gyrista
- Subphylum: Ochrophytina
- Class: Bacillariophyceae
- Order: Naviculales
- Family: Naviculaceae
- Genus: Pulchella; Krammer, 2000

Type species
- Pulchella kriegeriana

Genus of single-celled organisms

Pulchella is a diatom genus in the family Naviculaceae.

== Species ==
As of August 2015 the genus contains seven described species.

- Pulchella baicalensis
- Pulchella kriegeriana
- Pulchella minutissima
- Pulchella obsita
- Pulchella schwabei
- Pulchella sergejii
- Pulchella skvortzowii
