= Stilus =

Scientific classification
- Domain: Eukaryota
- Clade: Diaphoretickes
- Clade: SAR
- Clade: Stramenopiles
- Phylum: Gyrista
- Subphylum: Ochrophytina
- Class: Bacillariophyceae
- Order: Naviculales
- Family: Plagiotropidaceae
- Genus: Stilus; T.B.B. Paddock, 1988

Genus of single-celled organisms

Stilus is a genus of diatoms in the family Plagiotropidaceae.
