= Tertiarius =

Scientific classification
- Domain: Eukaryota
- Clade: Diaphoretickes
- Clade: SAR
- Clade: Stramenopiles
- Phylum: Gyrista
- Subphylum: Ochrophytina
- Class: Bacillariophyceae
- Order: Naviculales
- Family: Brachysiraceae
- Genus: Tertiarius; H. Håkansson et G. Khursevich, 1997

Genus of single-celled organisms

Tertiarius is a genus of freshwater diatoms known from the fossil record.

== Species ==
Some species include:

- Tertiarius pygmaeus
- Tertiarius transilvanicus
- Tertiarius transylvanicus
