= Plagiotropidaceae =

Scientific classification
- Domain: Eukaryota
- Clade: Diaphoretickes
- Clade: SAR
- Clade: Stramenopiles
- Phylum: Gyrista
- Subphylum: Ochrophytina
- Class: Bacillariophyceae
- Order: Naviculales
- Family: Plagiotropidaceae; D.G.Mann

Genera
- Banquisia; Ephemera; Manguinea; Meuniera; Pachyneis; Plagiolemma; Plagiotropis; Stauropsis; Stilus

Family of single-celled organisms

Plagiotropidaceae is a family of diatoms in the order Naviculales.
