= Brachysiraceae =

Scientific classification
- Domain: Eukaryota
- Clade: Diaphoretickes
- Clade: SAR
- Clade: Stramenopiles
- Phylum: Gyrista
- Subphylum: Ochrophytina
- Class: Bacillariophyceae
- Order: Naviculales
- Family: Brachysiraceae; D.G.Mann

Genera
- Brachysira; Nupela; †Tertiarius

Family of single-celled organisms

Brachysiraceae is a family of diatoms.

== Genera ==
- Brachysira
- Nupela
- †Tertiarius
