= Nupela =

Scientific classification
- Domain: Eukaryota
- Clade: Sar
- Clade: Stramenopiles
- Division: Ochrophyta
- Clade: Diatomeae
- Class: Bacillariophyceae
- Order: Naviculales
- Family: Brachysiraceae
- Genus: Nupela; Vyverman and Compere, 1991

Type species
- Nupela giluwensis Vyverman and Compère, 1991

Species
- 80, see text

Genus of single-celled organisms

Nupela is a genus of diatom. Species of Nupela typically measure less than 20 μm. The genus was first described as being isovalvar, however many recently described species are heterovalvar. The main diagnostic characteristic of the genus is the presence of an external covering over the areolae. The genus was circumscribed by Wim Vyverman and Pierre Compère in 1991, with Nupela giluwensis assigned as the type, and at that time, only species.

Nupela was originally described from high elevation ponds in Papua New Guinea. Since then, Nupela has been found in waters with a neutral pH and low conductivity throughout Europe, South America, North America, Asia and Africa. Five newly described species from Yunnan China were added to the genus in 2022.

== Species ==
- Nupela acaciensis Vouilloud & Sala, 2014
- Nupela amabilis P.Tremarin & T.Ludwig, 2015
- Nupela americana Kociolek, 2014
- Nupela astartiella ' Metzeltin & Lange-Bertalot, 1998
- Nupela bicapitata (Hustedt) P.Tremarin & T.Ludwig, 2015
- Nupela brachysirioides Lange-Bertalot, 1993
- Nupela brevistriata M.Rybak, Noga, C.N.Solak & Kulikovskiy, 2020
- Nupela butterfassiana (Lange-Bertalot) Lange-Bertalot, 1999
- Nupela Carolina Potapova & Clason, 2003
- Nupela catatumbensis Vouilloud & Plata-Díaz, 2014
- Nupela chilensis (Krasske) Lange-Bertalot, 1994
- Nupela comperei G.Moser, 1998
- Nupela cymbelloidea Metzeltin & Lange-Bertalot, 1998
- Nupela decipiens (Reimer) M.Potapova, 2013
- Nupela deformis Lange-Bertalot, 1994
- Nupela difficilis A.Straube, P.Tremarin & T.Ludwig, 2015
- Nupela elegantula Potapova, 2011
- Nupela ellipticobaicalis Kulikovskiy & Lange-Bertalot, 2015
- Nupela elongata Kulikovskiy & Lange-Bertalot, 2015
- Nupela encyonopsis Metzeltin & Lange-Bertalot, 1998
- Nupela eremica Blanco, Muñoz-López & Rivera-Rondón, 2020
- Nupela exigua Thomas & Kociolek, 2014
- Nupela exilissima Kulikovskiy & Lange-Bertalot, 2015
- Nupela exotica Monnier, Lange-Bertalot & Bertrand, 2003
- Nupela fennica (Hustedt) H.Lange-Bertalot, 2004
- Nupela floridana D.Metzeltin & H.Lange-Bertalot, 2007
- Nupela frezelii Potapova, 2011
- Nupela giluwensis Vyverman & Compère, 1991
- Nupela gomphosphenioides Kulikovskiy & Lange-Bertalot, 2015
- Nupela gracillima (Hustedt) Lange-Bertalot, 1993
- Nupela hagensis Vyverman, 1991
- Nupela heterostriata Kulikovskiy & Lange-Bertalot, 2015
- Nupela imperfecta (H.Schimanski) Lange-Bertalot & Genkal, 1999
- Nupela impexiformis (Lange-Bertalot) Lange-Bertalot
- Nupela indonesica Kulikovskiy, Maltsev, Glushchenko & Kociolek, 2020
- Nupela jahniae-reginae Lange-Bertalot & Metzeltin, 2000
- Nupela kocioleckii A.Straube, P.Tremarin & T.Ludwig, 2015
- Nupela kociolekii Straube et al.
- Nupela lapidosa (Krasske) Lange-Bertalot, 1999
- Nupela lesothensis (Schoeman) H.Lange-Bertalot, 2000
- Nupela leviundulata Kulikovskiy & Lange-Bertalot, 2015
- Nupela major P.Yu, Q-M You & J.P.Kociolek, 2017
- Nupela marvanii A.Wojtal, 2009
- Nupela matrioschka M.Kulikovskiy, Lange-Bertalot & A.Witkowski, 2009
- Nupela metzeltinii P.Tremarin & T.Ludwig, 2015
- Nupela mongolocolleagarum Kulkovskiy & Dorofeyuk, 2012
- Nupela monoraphia Kociolek, 2014
- Nupela neglecta Ponader, Lowe & Potapova, 2003
- Nupela neogracillima Kulikovskiy & Lange-Bertalot, 2009
- Nupela neotropica Lange-Bertalot, 1994
- Nupela obliqua Metzeltin & Lange-Bertalot, 1998
- Nupela pallavicinii (Krasske) Lange-Bertalot, 1994
- Nupela paludigena (Scherer) Lange-Bertalot, 1993
- Nupela pardinhoensis D.Bes, L.C.Torgan & L.Ector, 2012
- Nupela pennsylvanica (Patrick) Potapova, 2011
- Nupela pocsii K.Buczkó & A.Z.Wojtal, 2013
- Nupela potapovae Bahls, 2011
- Nupela praecipua (Reichardt) Reichardt, 2000
- Nupela praecipuoides P.Tremarin & T.Ludwig, 2015
- Nupela protracta Kulikovskiy & Lange-Bertalot, 2015
- Nupela rhetica (Wuthrich) Lange-Bertalot, 1993
- Nupela rumrichiorum Lange-Bert., 1994
- Nupela rumrichorum Lange-Bertalot, 1994
- Nupela schoemaniana Lange-Bertalot, 1993
- Nupela scissura P.A.Siver, P.B.Hamilton & E.A.Morales, 2007
- Nupela semifasciata Amaral, T.Ludwig & Bueno, 2021
- Nupela subinvicta (Krasske) Lange-Bertalot, 1994
- Nupela subpallavicinii Metzeltin & Lange-Bertalot, 1998
- Nupela subrostrata (Hustedt) M.Potapova, 2011
- Nupela tenuicephala (Hustedt) Lange-Bertalot, 1993
- Nupela tenuistriata (Hustedt) Metzeltin & Lange-Bertalot, 1998
- Nupela thurstonensis (Kaczmarska) M.Kulikovskiy, Lange-Bertalot & A.Witkowski, 2009
- Nupela torganiae P.Tremarin & T.Ludwig, 2015
- Nupela tristis (Krasske) Lange-Bertalot, 1994
- Nupela tropica (Hustedt) Lange-Bertalot, 1999
- Nupela vasta Kulikovskiy & Lange-Bertalot, 2015
- Nupela vitiosa (Schimanski) Lange-Bertalot, 2004
- Nupela vyvermanii Moser, 1998
- Nupela wellneri U.Rumrich, H.Lange-Bertalot & M.Rumrich, 2000
- Nupela zizkae Metzeltin & Lange-Bertalot, 1998
