= Cosmioneidaceae =

Scientific classification
- Domain: Eukaryota
- Clade: Diaphoretickes
- Clade: SAR
- Clade: Stramenopiles
- Phylum: Gyrista
- Subphylum: Ochrophytina
- Class: Bacillariophyceae
- Order: Naviculales
- Family: Cosmioneidaceae

Family of diatoms

Cosmioneidaceae is a family of diatoms belonging to the order Naviculales.

Genera:

- Cosmioneis D.G.Mann & Stickle
