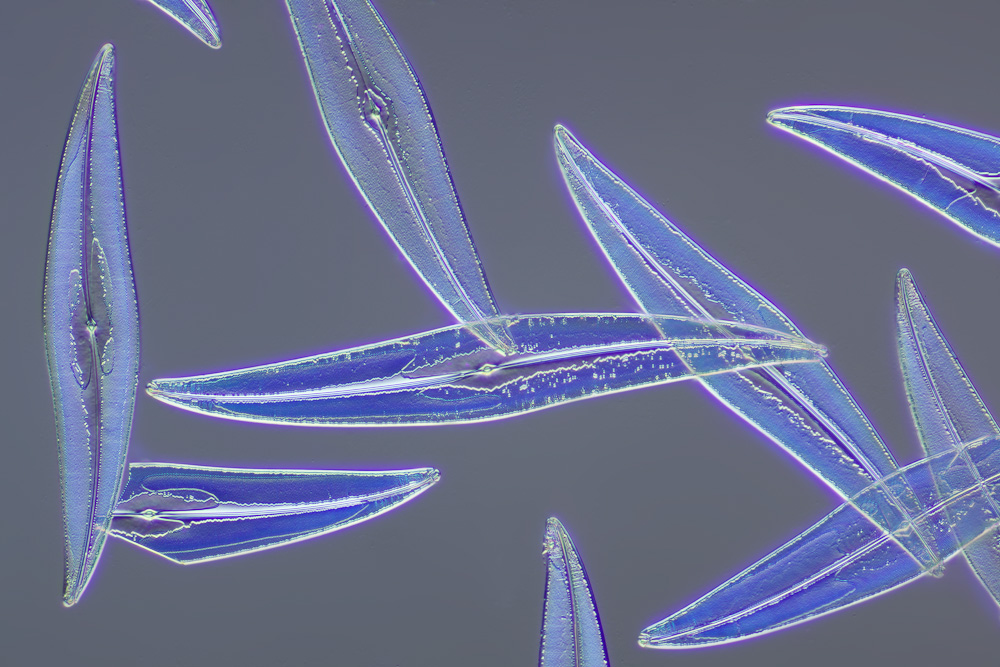
- Pleurosigma angulatum

Scientific classification
- Domain: Eukaryota
- Clade: Sar
- Clade: Stramenopiles
- Division: Ochrophyta
- Clade: Bacillariophyta
- Class: Bacillariophyceae
- Order: Naviculales
- Family: Pleurosigmataceae
- Genus: Pleurosigma; W. Smith, 1852

= Pleurosigma =

Genus of diatoms

Pleurosigma is a genus of widely distributed diatoms found abundantly in brackish to marine waters. It is a group of primarily pelagic or benthic species found in large populations on sediments, although some species are also found in planktonic samples.

== Characteristics ==
Pleurosigma is mainly a benthic genus of diatoms, whose cells are several times longer than they are wide. They present bright green chloroplasts observed in the shape of ribbons under a microscope. The central nucleus composes the core of the cytoplasm. During anaphase, daughter chromosomes join at the poles of the spindle apparatus, and then move farther apart. During telophase, the daughter nuclei are organized. Cytokinesis starts during anaphase, where a small cleavage slices the cytoplasm into two along the valvar plane. The median part of each chloroplast branches into a large, elongated lobe along the interior of one of the valves, and into two similar lobes on the other valve. Cell division begins by a fissure across the median lobe. After the division, the parts of the chloroplast migrate to the inner side of the old valves.

== Species ==
The following list displays the accepted species belonging to Pleurosigma. Many species of the genus were described by Albert Mann in 1925, but remained unrecorded due to hasty documentation. In 2002, the type specimens of said species were reviewed in hopes of restoring their taxonomic placement; this revision brought several changes, such as the conversion of some species into synonyms of others.

- Pleurosigma acus A. Mann, 1925
- Pleurosigma amara Stidolph, 1992
- Pleurosigma dolosum A. Mann, 1925
- Pleurosigma exemptum A. Mann, 1925 (=P. obesum A. Mann, 1925)
- Pleurosigma frenguellianum Sterrenburg, Sunesen & Sar, 2014
- Pleurosigma hinzianum Sterrenburg, Sunesen & Sar, 2014
- Pleurosigma normanii Ralfs in Pritchard, 1861 (=P. falx A. Mann, 1925)
- Pleurosigma obtusum A. Mann, 1925 (=P. prisma A. Mann, 1925)
- Pleurosigma pacificum Fei-Chao Du, Yu-Hang Li & Kui-Dong Xu, 2023
- Pleurosigma rigens A. Mann, 1925
- Pleurosigma suluense A. Mann, 1925
