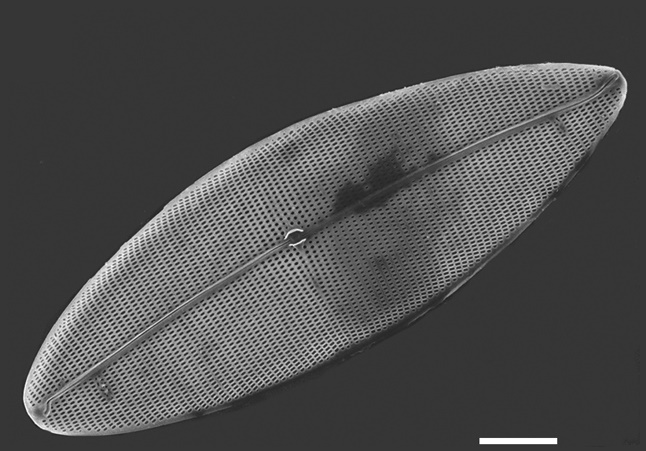
- Pleurosigma pacificum

Scientific classification
- Domain: Eukaryota
- Clade: Diaphoretickes
- Clade: SAR
- Clade: Stramenopiles
- Phylum: Gyrista
- Subphylum: Ochrophytina
- Class: Bacillariophyceae
- Order: Naviculales
- Family: Pleurosigmataceae; Mereschkowsky, 1903

= Pleurosigmataceae =

Family of diatoms

Pleurosigmataceae is a diatom family of the order Naviculales.

== Genera ==
The following genera are in this family:

- Arcuatasigma G. Reid, 2012
- Carinasigma G. Reid, 2012
- Cochlearsigma G. Reid, 2012
- Costasigma G. Reid, 2012
- Donkinia J. Ralfs, 1861
- Gyrosigma A. H. Hassall, 1845
- Hyalosigma N. I. Strelnikova & J. P. Kociolek, 2006
- Pleurosigma W. Smith, 1852
- Rhoicosigma A. Grunow, 1867
- Toxonidea A. S. Donkin, 1858
- Toxonidisigma Lobban & G. Reid, 2018
