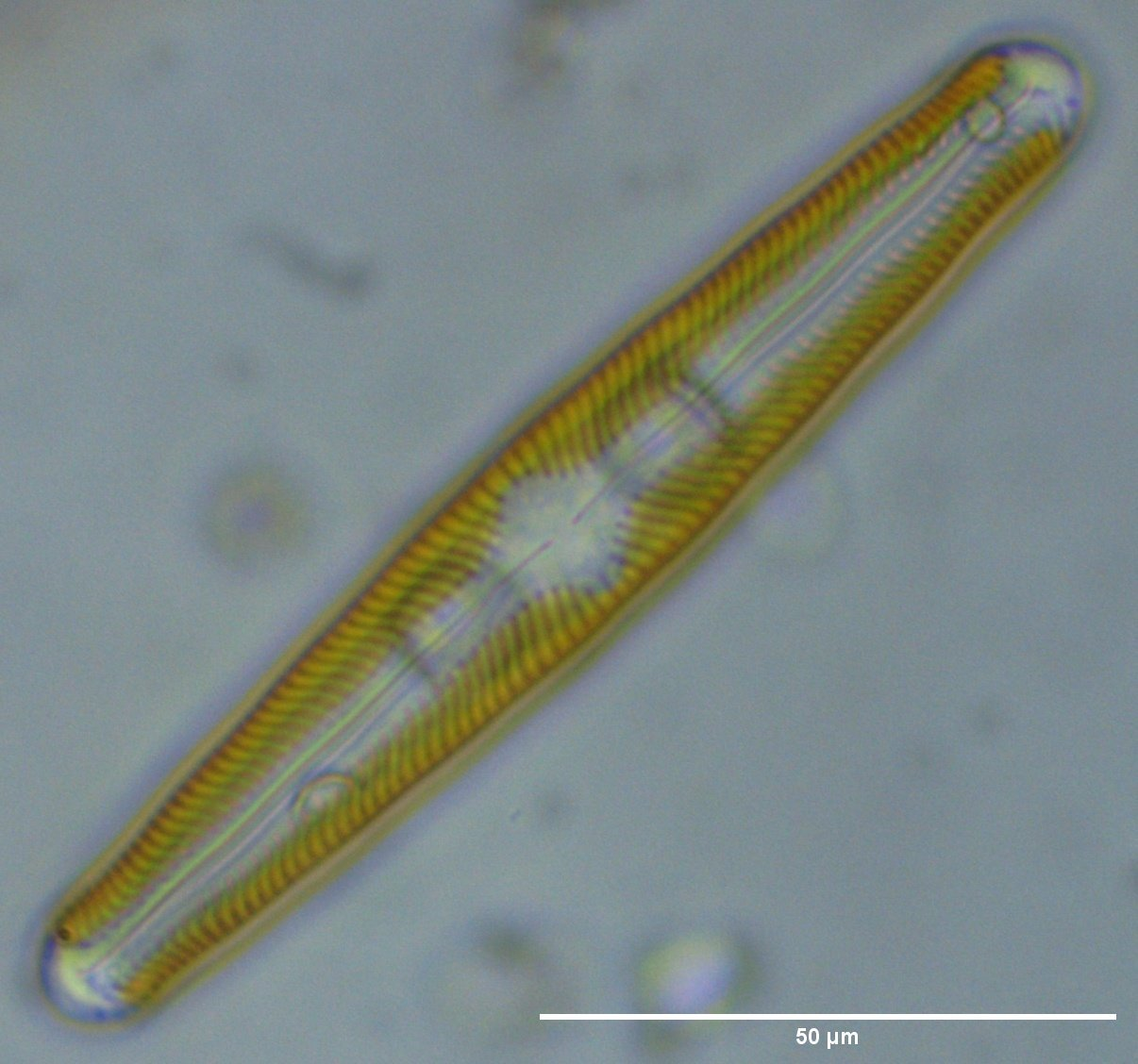
- Navicula oblonga

Scientific classification
- Domain: Eukaryota
- Clade: Diaphoretickes
- Clade: SAR
- Clade: Stramenopiles
- Phylum: Gyrista
- Subphylum: Ochrophytina
- Class: Bacillariophyceae
- Order: Naviculales
- Family: Naviculaceae; Kützing, 1844

Genera
- See text

= Naviculaceae =

Family of diatoms

Naviculaceae is a diatom family in the order Naviculales.

Naviculaceae are typically composed of lineate areolae, one of the many forms of areolae. Some of the other areolae are punctate (Gomphoneis) and loculate (Diploneis). These can be found among other families of diatoms including Thalassiosiraceae. The areolae found in Naviculaceae tend to be uniseriate. Some Naviculaceae tend to have a pseudoseptum which is a silica plate extending internally from the apical portion of the valve. To contrast, a pseudoseptum is part of a valve while a septum is part of a copula, or girdle band. For example, the pseudoseptum occurs in some species of Gomphonema, Gomphoneis, Stauroneis and Navicula. The plural is pseudosepta.

== Genera ==
- Adlafia
- Alveovallum
- Amicula
- Astartiella
- Austariella
- Berkella
- Caloneis
- Capartogramma
- Chamaepinnularia
- Cocconema
- Craspedostauros
- Cymatoneis
- Decussata
- Diademoides
- Envekadea
- Eolimna
- Fistulifera
- Geissleria
- Germainiella
- Haslea
- Hippodonta
- Kobayasiella
- Krasskella
- Kurpiszia
- Lacunicula
- Lecohuia
- Lulicola
- Mastoneis
- Mayamaea
- Melonavicula
- Membraneis
- Meuniera
- Microcostatus
- Microfissurata
- Muelleria
- Navicula
- Naviculadicta
- Navigiolum
- Neidiopsis
- Nupela
- Pinnunavis
- Plagiotropus
- Prestauroneis
- Pseudogomphonema
- Pseudonavicula
- Pulchella
- Rhoikoneis
- Seminavis
- Stauroptera
- Trachyneis
- Veigaludwigia
