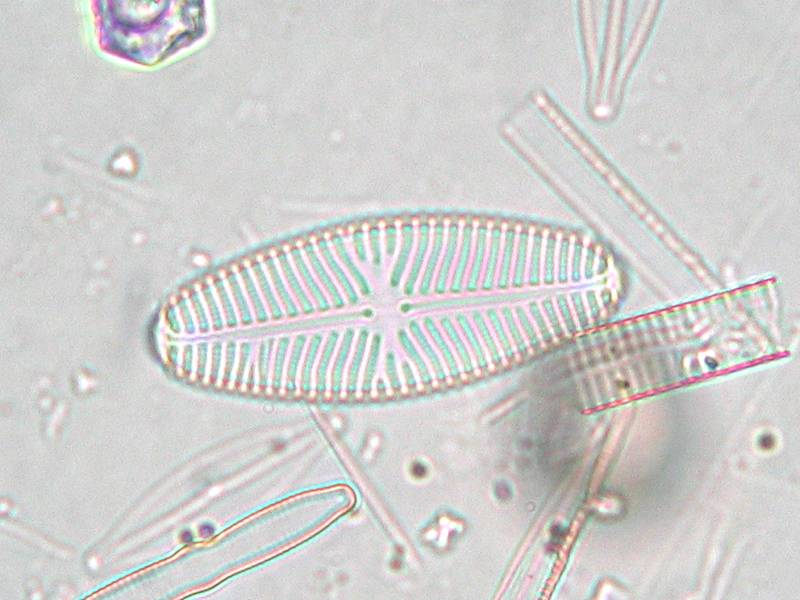
- Navicula reinhardtii

Scientific classification
- Domain: Eukaryota
- Supergroup: Stramenopiles
- Division: Ochrophyta
- Clade: Bacillariophyta
- Class: Bacillariophyceae
- Order: Naviculales
- Family: Naviculaceae
- Genus: Navicula; Bory de Saint-Vincent, 1822

Type species
- Navicula tripunctata

Species
- List of Navicula species

= Navicula =

Genus of diatoms

Navicula is a genus of boat-shaped diatom (single-celled photosynthetic organisms), comprising over 1,200 species, though many Navicula species likely do not belong in the genus strictly speaking. Navicula is Latin for "small ship", and also a term in English for a boat-shaped incense-holder. Navicula is a cosmopolitan genus and species are present in both freshwater and marine environments, typically attached to surfaces (i.e. benthic).

== Description ==
Navicula species are pennate diatoms. Their valves are typically elliptical, though some species have more pinched ends than others. Navicula cells have two chloroplasts, one along each side of the valve along the girdle bands.

== Motility ==
Navicula diatoms are highly motile and move through a gliding movement This is done through excretion of extracellular polymeric substances (EPS). One form of EPS surrounds the outside of the cell and another is excreted through a slit in the frustule called a raphe, allowing the cell to glide along a track.
