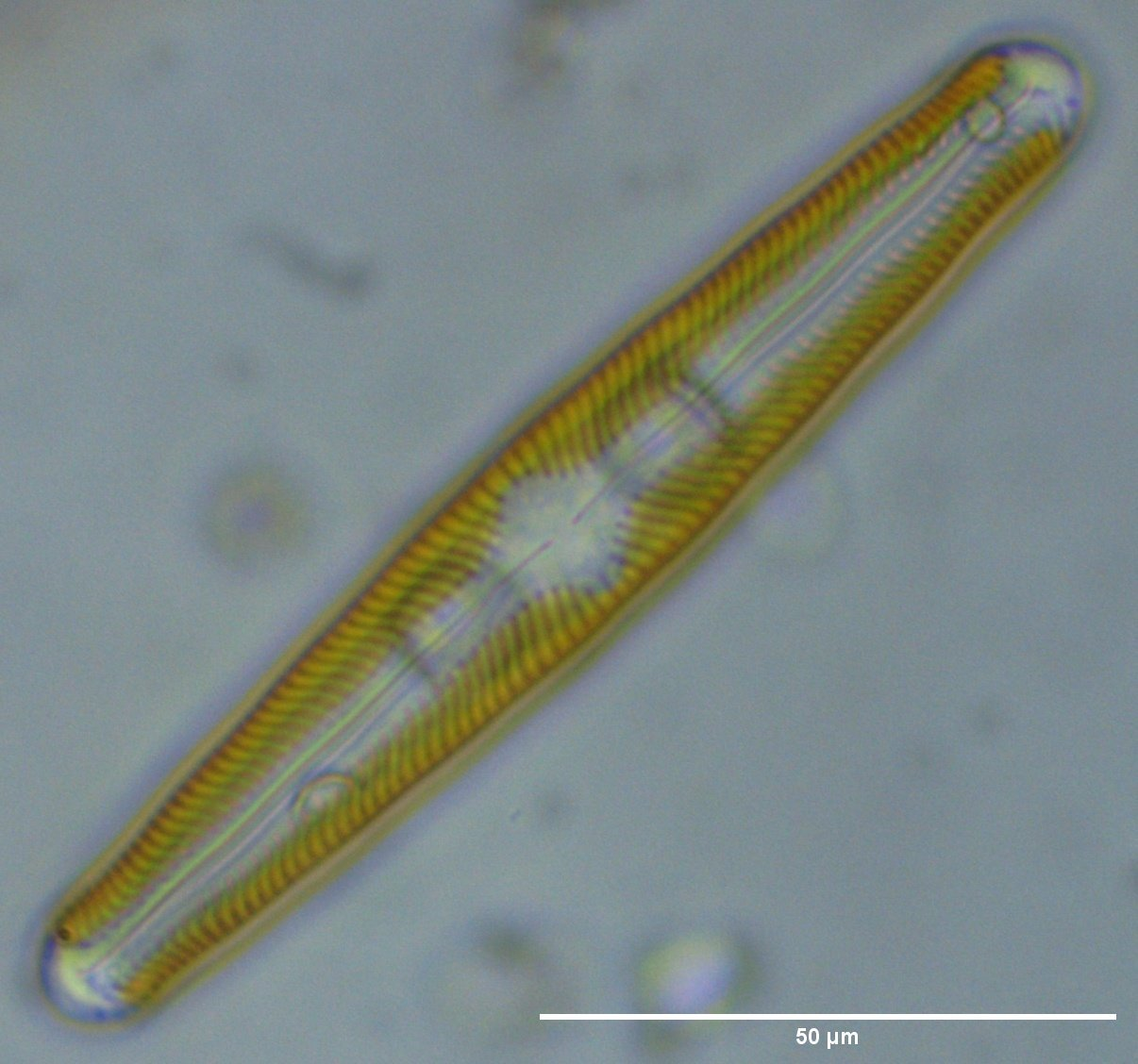
- Navicula oblonga

Scientific classification
- Domain: Eukaryota
- Clade: Sar
- Clade: Stramenopiles
- Division: Ochrophyta
- Clade: Bacillariophyta
- Class: Bacillariophyceae
- Order: Naviculales; Bessey, 1907

= Naviculales =

Order of single-celled organisms

The Naviculales are an order of diatoms.

== Suborders ==
- Phaeodactylineae

== Family ==
According to the GBIF, the order has the following families;

- Amphipleuraceae (contains 1k species)
- Berkeleyaceae (144)
- Brachysiraceae (112)
- Cavinulaceae (15)
- Cosmioneidaceae (7)
- Diadesmidaceae (303)
- Diploneidaceae (450)
- Gomphonemaceae (12)
- Metascolioneidaceae (3)
- Naviculaceae (9k)
- Neidiaceae (676)
- Phaeodactylaceae (2)
- Pinnulariaceae (3k)
- Plagiotropidaceae (50)
- Pleurosigmataceae (881)
- Proschkiniaceae (36)
- Scolioneidaceae (1)
- Scoliotropidaceae (59)
- Sellaphoraceae (250)
- Stauroneidaceae (1k)

== Unplaced genera ==
There are 5 genera that are incertae sedis.

- Boreozonacola Lange-Bertalot, Kulikovskiy & Witkowski, 2010 (4)
- Brevilinea P.A.Siver, P.B.Hamilton & E.A.Morales, 2008 (2)
- Cholnokyella J.C.Taylor & Lange-Bertalot, 2013 (1)
- Playaensis S.A.Spaulding & J.P.Kociolek, 2002 (3)
- Rexlowea J.P.Kociolek & E.W.Thomas, 2010 (2)

Figures in brackets are approx. how many species per genus.
