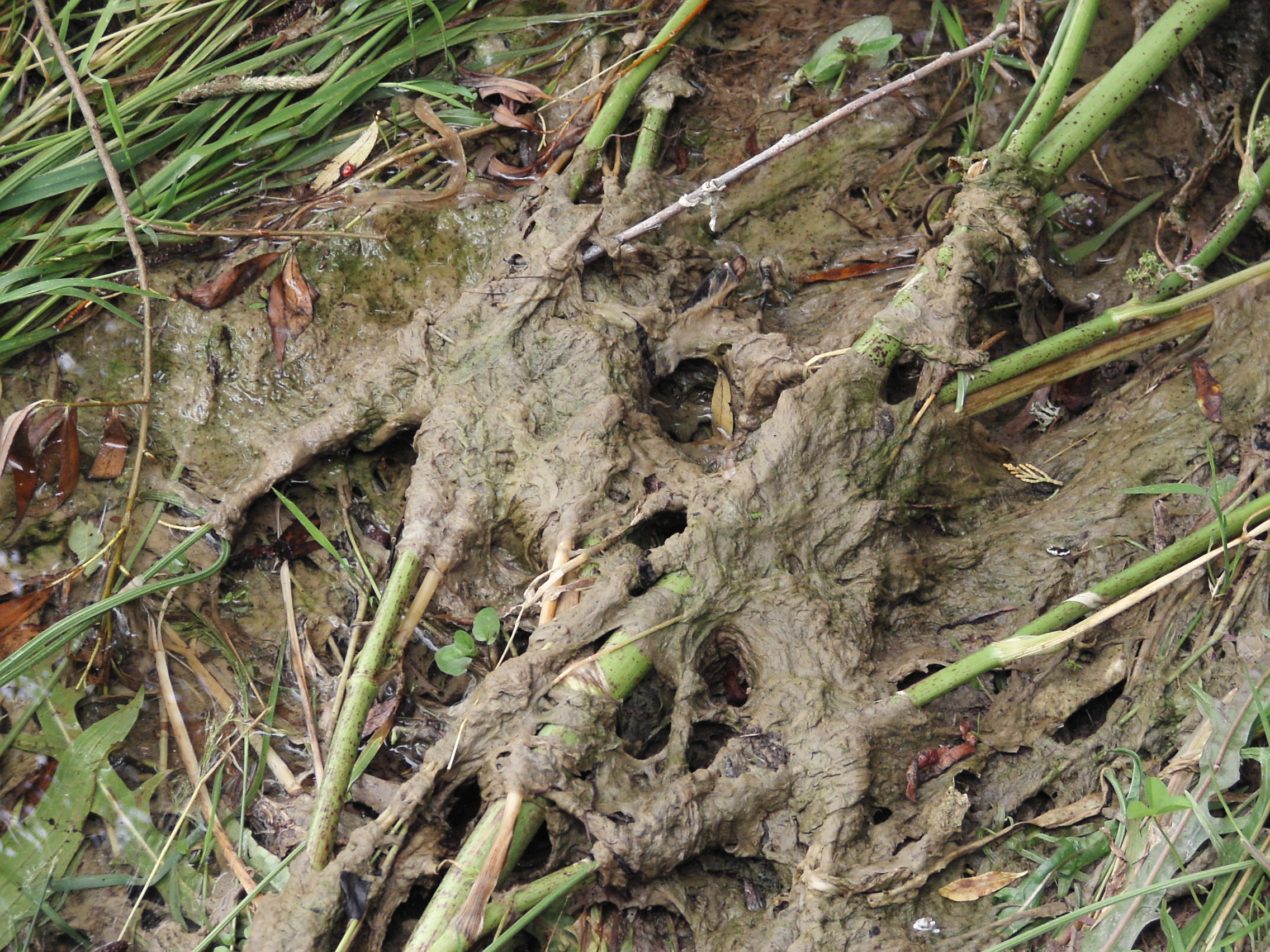
- Didymo found beside the Mararoa River in New Zealand.
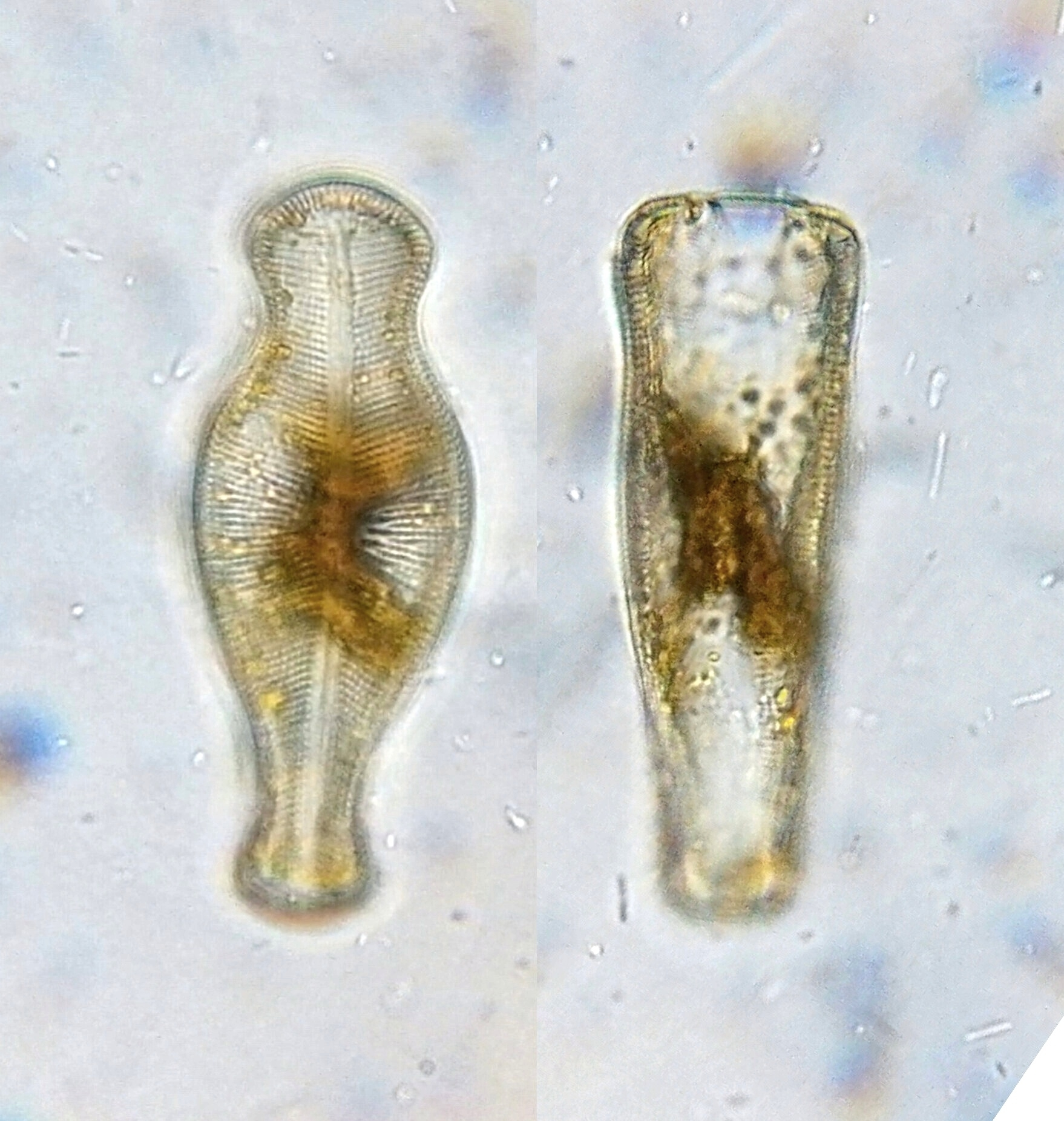
- Microscopic photo of D. geminata

Scientific classification
- Domain: Eukaryota
- Supergroup: Stramenopiles
- Division: Ochrophyta
- Clade: Bacillariophyta
- Class: Bacillariophyceae
- Order: Cymbellales
- Family: Cymbellaceae
- Genus: Didymosphenia
- Species: D. geminata

Binomial name
- Didymosphenia geminata (Lyngbye) M. Schmidt, 1899

Synonyms
- Echinella geminata Lyngbye, 1819; Gomphonema geminatum (Lyngbye) C. Agardh, 1824

= Didymosphenia geminata =

Species of single-celled organism

Didymosphenia geminata (/ˌdɪdɪməˈsfiːniə ˌdʒɛmɪˈnætə/), commonly known as didymo or rock snot, is a species of diatom that produces nuisance growths in freshwater rivers and streams with consistently low water temperatures and low nutrient levels. It is native to the northern hemisphere, and considered an invasive species in Australia, Argentina, New Zealand, and Chile. Even within its native range, it has taken on invasive characteristics since the 1980s. It is not considered a significant human health risk, but it can affect stream habitats and sources of food for fish and make recreational activities unpleasant. This microscopic alga can be spread in a single drop of water.

== Description ==
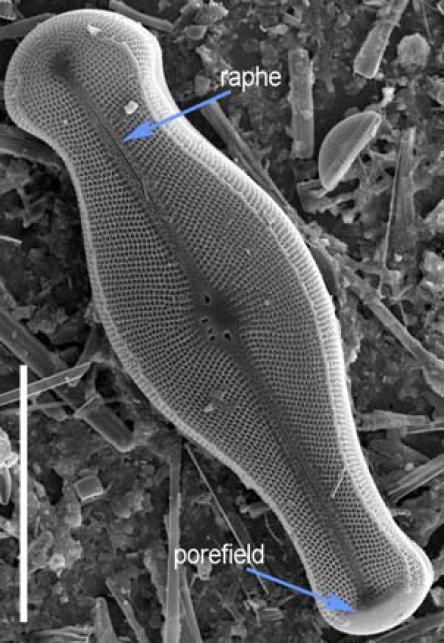
Scanning electron micrograph of the silica cell wall of D. geminata. Scale bar is 50 μm. Image by Sarah Spaulding, USGS.

Didymosphenia geminata is a diatom, which is a type of single-celled organism unique for their silica (SiO_{2}) cell walls. The life history of diatoms includes both vegetative and sexual reproduction, though the sexual stage is not yet documented in this species. Although it is symmetric only along the apical axis, typical of gomphonemoid diatoms, it is a cymbelloid, which are typically symmetric along both primary axes. Cells contain a raphe, which allows them to move on surfaces, and an apical porefield, through which a mucopolysaccharide stalk is secreted.

The stalk can attach to rocks, plants, or other submerged surfaces. When the diatom cell divides, through vegetative reproduction, the stalk divides too, eventually forming a mass of branching stalks. The nuisance build-up is not the cell itself, but their massive production of extracellular stalks. Extracellular polymeric substances (EPS) that form the stalks are made primarily of polysaccharides and protein, forming complex, multi-layered structures that are resistant to degradation.

== Native range ==
The native distribution of D. geminata is the cool temperate regions of the Northern Hemisphere, including the rivers of northern forests and alpine regions of Europe, Asia and parts of North America. Until its recent discovery in New Zealand, where it was introduced, it was never previously found in the Southern Hemisphere. The distribution of didymo in the last two decades appears to be gradually expanding outside its native range. Even within its native range, there have been reports of excessive growths in areas where it previously existed only in low concentrations.

Didymo is now considered likely to be native to New York.

== Current distribution ==
=== Russian Federation ===
Buryatia Widespread across large areas of Russia. Occurrence, ecology, water quality, and scanning electron micrography of D. geminata from Irokinda Mine Site, Buryatia, John G. Aronson, North American Diatom Symposium, Sept, 2011.

=== North America ===
==== Canada ====
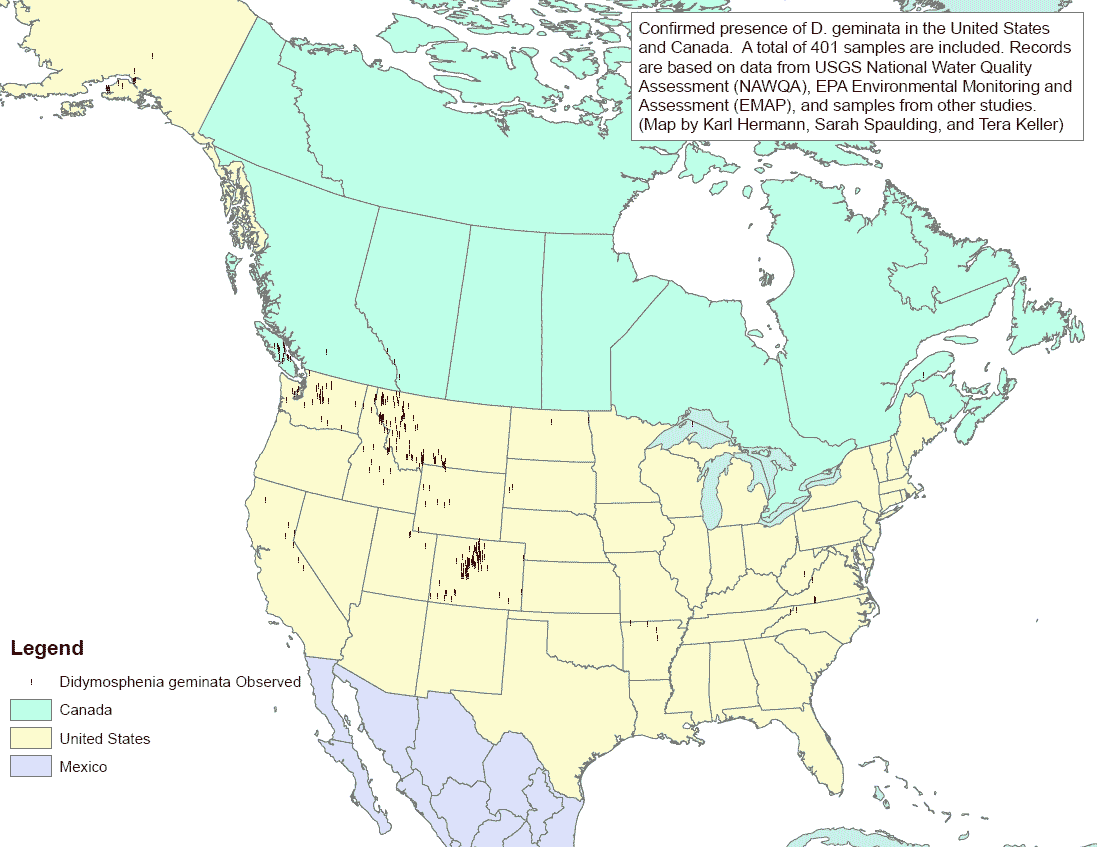
Distribution map - Confirmed presence of Didymosphenia geminata in the United States and Canada. Source: EPA 2007

Alberta: Earliest anecdotal reports of D. geminata blooms in Alberta rivers occurred as early as 1860. Reports of Didymo presence and bloom formation have been documented for most rivers in the South Saskatchewan River Basin in recent years (2005 to present).

British Columbia: D. geminata was first reported as a nuisance species in the late 1980s on Vancouver Island. Since that time, outbreaks of Didymo have been reported on the island and on the mainland.

Quebec: D. geminata was first officially reported in 2006 but a recent report demonstrates that it was present in the sediments back in the 70s at the least.

New-Brunswick: D. geminata was first reported in 2007.

Ontario: D. geminata was reported in the upper St. Marys River in 2015 and 2016.

==== United States ====
Arkansas: In late spring / early summer of 2005, didymo was found directly below Bull Shoals Dam on the White River. The Arkansas Department of Environmental Quality has found a 13-mile reach of the river to be affected.

Arizona. Found in Oak Creek just above the Pine Flat Campground in late August 2015

California: Rock snot has been around in Northern California for quite some time, and is commonly found on the North and South Fork of the Yuba River. It can also be found in reservoirs such as Lake Shasta, Bullard's Bar Reservoir, and Scotts Flat Lake.

Colorado: The range of Didymosphenia geminata was extended into Colorado by limnologist John G. Aronson, who collected it in 1976 from upper Fish Creek, near Steamboat Springs, Colorado.

Connecticut: In 2011 anglers reported blooms of didymo in the West Branch of the Farmington River to the Connecticut Department of Energy and Environmental Protection.

Idaho: According to the Idaho Department of Fish and Game, didymo has been identified along the South Fork of the Boise River for a number of years. Biologists cannot say for sure if it is native to the drainage, or has appeared in the last 10 to 15 years.

Indiana: Found in unnamed creek which feeds into Patoka River; Orange County. (pers. obs: amateur naturalist)

Kentucky: Didymo was found in the Cumberland River below Wolf Creek Dam in the Crocus Creek area 2008. The State of Kentucky has banned felt-soled waders in the river to prevent spread of the organism.

Maryland: In May 2008, didymo was found in the Gunpowder River in Baltimore County. In December 2009, it was found in the Savage River in western Maryland. In May 2012, its presence was confirmed in Big Hunting Creek in Frederick County.

Missouri: There are currently no known infested streams in the state. The nearest infestation is located in the White River, just south of the Missouri-Arkansas border.

New Hampshire: During the summer of 2007, didymo was discovered for the first time in New Hampshire in the Connecticut River near Pittsburg.

New York: Didymo is now considered likely to be native to New York. In August 2007, didymo was found in New York State in a section of the Batten Kill, a Hudson River tributary, in Washington County. It has also been found in Esopus Creek in the Catskills. Black Creek Washington County

North Carolina: A slithery, mucous-like algae known as "rock snot" is the latest in a long line of invasive species haranguing Western North Carolina's famous trout waters. The N.C. Wildlife Resources Commission is advising anglers to use extra caution when cleaning their equipment to prevent the spread of didymo, which was recently found in the Tuckasegee River in Jackson County.

Pennsylvania: Didymo has been confirmed in the Delaware River. In 2012, its presence was confirmed in the Youghiogheny River. In 2013, PA Department of Environmental Protection put out an alert that it has now been discovered in Pine Creek, Lycoming County.

South Dakota: Didymo has been present in Rapid Creek in South Dakota since at least 2005, and is blamed for a significant decline in the brown trout population there. It is also present to lesser extents in other nearby locations.

Tennessee: Didymo was found in the tailwaters of the Norris, Cherokee, Wilbur and South Holston hydroelectric dams in 2005, the first U.S. finding east of the Mississippi River.

Vermont: In June 2007, didymo was discovered in the Connecticut River near Bloomfield, Vermont, its first recorded discovery in the northeastern United States. The sighting was reported by a fishing guide and confirmed by Dr. Sarah Spaulding, a didymo expert from Denver, Colorado.

Virginia: Didymo was identified in western Virginia in the summer of 2006 in the Smith River, the Jackson River, and the Pound River.

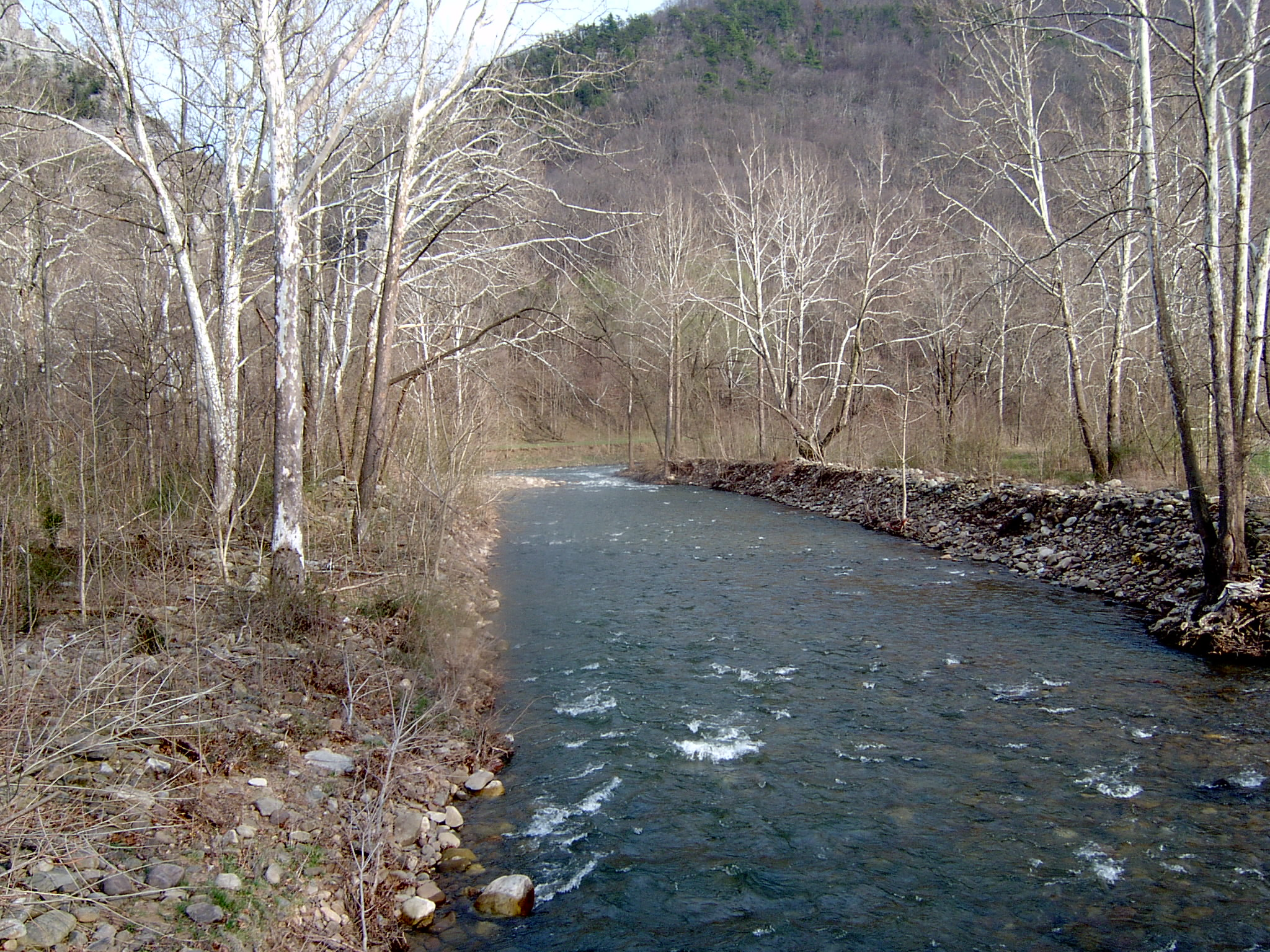
Seneca Creek in eastern West Virginia

West Virginia: In 2008, didymo was found in West Virginia in the Elk River in Webster County near Webster Springs and in Glady Fork and Gandy Creek, both in Randolph County. The alga was found in Seneca Creek in Pendleton County in 2009.

=== South America ===
Chile: In 2010, the United States Geological Survey (USGS) and a Chilean laboratory, Centro de Investigacion en Ecosistemas de la Patagonia (CIEP), confirmed the identification of the diatom D. geminata (didymo) as forming extensive blooms in Chilean rivers in Chile's Los Lagos Region (X Región de Los Lagos) in the Andes west of Esquel, a town in the Chubut Province of Argentina, with reports from the Espolon River and the Futaleufú River for a total of more than 56 river kilometers affected.

=== New Zealand ===
D. geminata was discovered in New Zealand in 2004, the first time it was found in the southern hemisphere. To restrict its spread, the whole of New Zealand's South Island was declared a controlled area in December 2005. Extensive publicity was carried out to limit the spread, but it has subsequently been found in an increasing number of rivers there.

== Preventing further spread ==
Signs posted by Biosecurity NZ to warn of didymo threat in Waiau River.

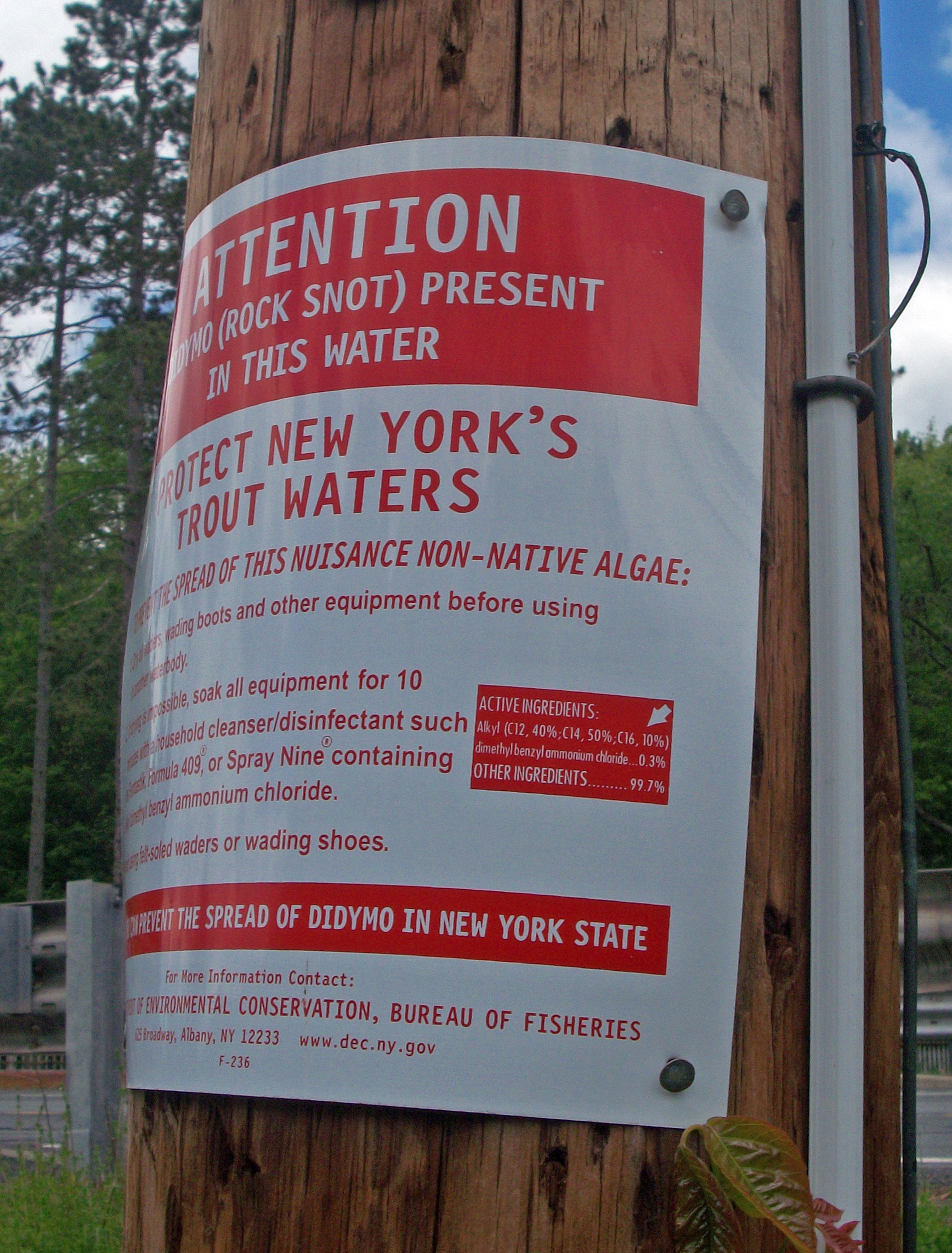
Sign on New York's Esopus Creek advising anglers about didymo

The following methods have been recommended to prevent the spread of didymo in New Zealand:

Check: Before leaving the river, remove all obvious clumps of algae and look for hidden clumps. Leave them at the site. If you find clumps later don't wash them down the drain, treat them with the approved methods below, dry them and soak them in bleach for at least 4 hours.

Clean: Soak and scrub all items for at least one minute in either hot (60 °C) water, a 2% solution of household bleach, antiseptic hand cleaner, or dishwashing detergent.

Dry: If cleaning is not practical (e.g. livestock, pets), after the item is completely dry wait an additional 48 hours before contact or use in any other waterway.

New Zealand and the U.S. states of Alaska, Maryland, South Dakota and Vermont have banned anglers from wearing felt-soled boots. Orvis, a leading U.S. manufacturer of fly-fishing equipment, has started selling more rubber-soled boots than felt-soled.

== Alternative theory ==
In the Gaspésie region of Quebec, a paleolimnological study was performed to (i) assess the validity of claims that didymo is in fact an introduced species in Quebec and (ii) explore potential mechanisms underlying the recent proliferation of didymo in the region. It was found that recent invasion or transfer to the Gaspésie region is a highly unlikely explanation for post-2006 didymo blooms. It was demonstrated that freshwater systems in Gaspésie are responding to recent climate warming. Given didymo's habitat and environmental preferences, it was proposed that climate-related changes in regional rivers are likely an important factor that favors its proliferation.

Dr. Max Bothwell at Environment Canada claims that phosphorus-poor streams create blooms of the algae. The research paper, "Blooms of benthic diatoms in phosphorus-poor streams" was first published in March 2017.
