= Cymbella elegans =

Scientific classification
- Domain: Eukaryota
- Clade: Sar
- Clade: Stramenopiles
- Division: Ochrophyta
- Clade: Bacillariophyta
- Class: Bacillariophyceae
- Order: Cymbellales
- Family: Cymbellaceae
- Genus: Cymbella
- Species: C. elegans

Binomial name
- Cymbella elegans Jasnitsky

Species of single-celled organism

Cymbella elegans is a diatom species in the genus Cymbella.
