= Gomphocymbella =

Scientific classification
- Domain: Eukaryota
- Clade: Sar
- Clade: Stramenopiles
- Division: Ochrophyta
- Clade: Bacillariophyta
- Class: Bacillariophyceae
- Order: Cymbellales
- Family: Cymbellaceae
- Genus: Gomphocymbella; O.Müller, 1905

Genus of algae

Gomphocymbella is a genus of diatoms belonging to the family Cymbellaceae.

== Species ==
Species:

- Gomphocymbella ancyli (Cleve) Hustedt
- Gomphocymbella aschersonii O.Müller
- Gomphocymbella asymmetrica Z.X.Shi & N.Li
