= Encyonema inelegans =

Scientific classification
- Domain: Eukaryota
- Clade: Sar
- Clade: Stramenopiles
- Division: Ochrophyta
- Clade: Bacillariophyta
- Class: Bacillariophyceae
- Order: Cymbellales
- Family: Encyonemataceae
- Genus: Encyonema
- Species: E. inelegans

Binomial name
- Encyonema inelegans (Cleve) Krammer

Species of single-celled organism

Encyonema inelegans is a diatom species in the genus Cymbella. It is a freshwater diatom species found in the United States.
