= Encyonopsis =

Scientific classification
- Domain: Eukaryota
- Clade: Sar
- Clade: Stramenopiles
- Division: Ochrophyta
- Clade: Bacillariophyta
- Class: Bacillariophyceae
- Order: Cymbellales
- Family: Cymbellaceae
- Genus: Encyonopsis; Krammer, 1997

Genus of algae

Encyonopsis is a genus of diatoms belonging to the family Cymbellaceae.

== Species ==
Species:

- Encyonopsis abbottii (Cholnoky & Claus) Krammer
- Encyonopsis aequaliformis Bahls
- Encyonopsis aequalis (W.Smith) Krammer
