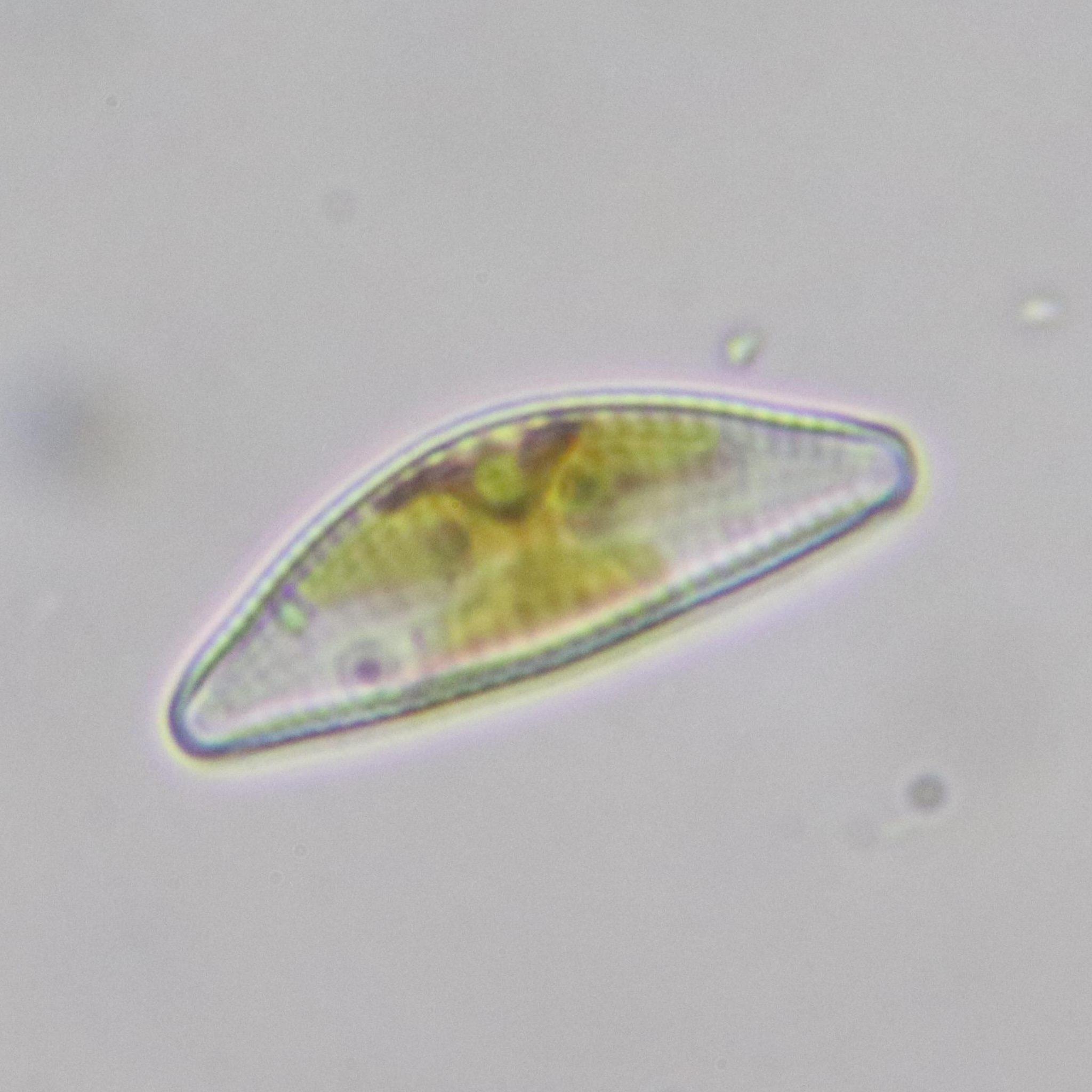
- Encyonema sp.

Scientific classification
- Domain: Eukaryota
- Clade: Sar
- Clade: Stramenopiles
- Division: Ochrophyta
- Clade: Bacillariophyta
- Class: Bacillariophyceae
- Order: Cymbellales
- Family: Encyonemataceae
- Genus: Encyonema; Kütz., 1833

= Encyonema =

Genus of diatoms

Encyonema is a genus of asymmetric biraphid diatoms belonging to the family Cymbellaceae. This genus is characterized by its curved dorsal edge and ventrally-deflected distal raphe ends. Encyonema contains mostly freshwater species, though there are a few marine exceptions. First described by German phycologist and botanist Friedrich T. Kützing in his 1833 publication "Synopsis diatomearum," this genus has over 400 described specific and infraspecific taxa and new species are still being described today. The genus underwent significant revision in the 1980s and 90s, resulting in the reclassification of multiple species as belonging to Encyonema that were previously grouped in the Cymbella genus. K. Krammer and Round et al. were the first to formally separate Encyonema species from Cymbella, citing differences in raphe orientation as well as striae and plastid structures.

The genus has cosmopolitan distribution, primarily being found in benthic freshwater habitats with low electrolyte content. Many Encyonema species are capable of producing mucilaginous sheaths, with some forming colonies within mucilage tubes. This genus exhibits a broad size range, with species like E. reichardtii being as small as 9.8 x 3.3 μm while others like E. reimeri get as large as 89 x 26.5 μm.

== Species ==
Species:

- Encyonema abruptirostratum Metzeltin, Kulikovskiy & Lange-Bertalot, 2012
- Encyonema accedens Krammer & Lange-Bertalot, 1998
- Encyonema acquapurae Wengrat, Marquardt & C.E.Wetzel, 2017
- Encyonema acquasede Marquardt, A.C.R.Rocha & C.E.Wetzel, 2016
- Encyonema acuminatum Z.X.Shi, 2013
- Encyonema aequilongum Lange-Bertalot & Krammer, 1997
- Encyonema affine Metzeltin & Krammer, 1997
- Encyonema africanum Krammer, 1997
- Encyonema alpha Heinzerling, 1908
- Encyonema alpiniforme Krammer, 1997
- Encyonema alpinum D.G.Mann, 1990
- Encyonema altiplanense Lange-Bertalot, 2000
- Encyonema amanianum Krammer, 1997
- Encyonema amazonianum Vouilloud, S.E.Sala, Núñez-Avellaneda & S.R.Duque, 2010
- Encyonema ampliatum Krammer & Lange-Bertalot, 1997
- Encyonema andranokelynum Krammer, 1997
- Encyonema angustecapitatum Krammer, 1997
- Encyonema angustum T.Marsson, 1900
- Encyonema ankobraense Krammer, 1997
- Encyonema antogaryanum Krammer, 1997
- Encyonema apiculatum Krammer, 1997
- Encyonema appalachianum M.Potapova, 2014
- Encyonema arcus Ralfs, 1861
- Encyonema aueri Krammer, 1997
- Encyonema auerswaldii Rabenhorst, 1853
- Encyonema bacillum Kulikovskiy, Metzeltin & Lange-Bertalot, 2012
- Encyonema baicalense Kulikovskiy, Metzeltin & Lange-Bertalot, 2012
- Encyonema baicalosilesiacum Kulikovskiy, Metzeltin & Lange-Bertalot, 2012
- Encyonema beta Heinzerling, 1908
- Encyonema biarcuatum Metzeltin & Lange-Bertalot, 2003
- Encyonema bipartitum Krammer, 1997
- Encyonema blancheanum Krammer, 1997
- Encyonema bonapartei Heudre, Wetzel & Ector, 2016
- Encyonema bourrellyi Metzeltin & Lange-Bertalot, 2007
- Encyonema braunii D.G.Mann, 1990
- Encyonema brehmiforme Krammer, 1997
- Encyonema brehmii D.G.Mann, 1990
- Encyonema brevicapitatum Krammer, 1997
- Encyonema brewerianum Krammer, 1997
- Encyonema burovae Kulikovskiy, Metzeltin & Lange-Bertalot, 2012
- Encyonema calciphilum Graeff & Kociolek, 2013
- Encyonema canadense Krammer & Lange-Bertalot, 1997
- Encyonema candangense W.J.da Silva & M.G.Machado de Souza, 2015
- Encyonema capixabense Marquardt, Morais & Zorzal-Almeida, 2025
- Encyonema carina Lange-Bertalot & Krammer, 1997
- Encyonema caronianum Krammer, 1997
- Encyonema cascadense Krammer, 1997
- Encyonema cespitosum Kützing, 1849
- Encyonema chebalingense W.Zhang & S.Blanco, 2021
- Encyonema chilense Krammer, 1997
- Encyonema costei Metzeltin & Lange-Bertalot, 2007
- Encyonema cristatum Frenguelli, 1933
- Encyonema cubanense Metzeltin & Lange-Bertalot, 2007
- Encyonema dadwinense Krammer, 1997
- Encyonema densistriatum E.Novelo, Tavera & C.Ibarra, 2007
- Encyonema difficiliformis Krammer, Lange-Bertalot & Metzeltin, 1997
- Encyonema difficilis Krammer, 1997
- Encyonema directiforme Krammer & Lange-Bertalot, 1997
- Encyonema directum K. Krammer, 1997
- Encyonema disjunctum Reichardt, 2004
- Encyonema distinctepunctatum Krammer, 1997
- Encyonema distinctum Lange-Bertalot & Krammer, 1997
- Encyonema donatoi Krammer & Lange-Bertalot, 1997
- Encyonema drakei Bahls, 2014
- Encyonema droseraphilum Bahls, 2013
- Encyonema dubium Krammer, 1997
- Encyonema elginense D.G.Mann, 1990
- Encyonema erdmannense Krammer, 1997
- Encyonema evergladianum Krammer, 1997
- Encyonema excavatum Z.X.Shi, 2013
- Encyonema excisum Frenguelli, 1933
- Encyonema exuberans P.I.Tremarin, C.E.Wetzel & T.A. Veiga Ludwig, 2011
- Encyonema fogedii Krammer, 1997
- Encyonema formosum D.G.Mann, 1990
- Encyonema friedelhinzae Krammer, 1997
- Encyonema gaeumannii Krammer, 1997
- Encyonema geisslerae Krammer, 1997
- Encyonema genkalii Lange-Bertalot & Krammer, 2003
- Encyonema gerstenbergeri Grunow, 1865
- Encyonema gibbum Krammer, 1997
- Encyonema girodii Héribaud, 1902
- Encyonema globiferum Ralfs, 1861
- Encyonema gracile Kirchner, 1879
- Encyonema gracile Rabenhorst, 1853
- Encyonema gracillimum Metzeltin & Lange-Bertalot, 2007
- Encyonema graciloides Krammer, 1997
- Encyonema grandi Héribaud, 1903
- Encyonema groenlandicum Kulikovskiy & Lange-Bertalot, 2009
- Encyonema grossestriatum D.G.Mann, 1990
- Encyonema guatemalense Krammer, 1997
- Encyonema guettingeri Krammer, 1997
- Encyonema hamsherae D.Winter & Bahls, 2013
- Encyonema haudelicata Metzeltin & Lange-Bertalot, 2007
- Encyonema hebridicum Grunow ex Cleve, 1891
- Encyonema hebridiforme Krammer, 1997
- Encyonema heilprinense Krammer, 1997
- Encyonema hilliardii Krammer, 1997
- Encyonema hintzii Krammer, 1997
- Encyonema hoelii Krammer, 1997
- Encyonema hohnii Krammer, 1997
- Encyonema holmenii Krammer, 1997
- Encyonema hophense Krammer, 1997
- Encyonema horstii Kulikovskiy, Khursevich & Witkowski, 2012
- Encyonema hungaricum Krammer, 1997
- Encyonema hustedtii Krammer, 1997
- Encyonema hyndmanii W.Smith
- Encyonema inarense Krammer, 1997
- Encyonema incertum Krammer, 1997
- Encyonema incurvatum Krammer, 1997
- Encyonema indistinctum Krammer, 1997
- Encyonema inelegans Krammer, 1997
- Encyonema insulsum Krammer & Lange-Bertalot, 1998
- Encyonema intermedium Héribaud, 1903
- Encyonema inuitorum Bahls, 2017
- Encyonema javanicum D.G.Mann, 1990
- Encyonema jemtlandicum Krammer, 1997
- Encyonema jolmolungmense Y.L.Li, 2007
- Encyonema jordaniforme Krammer, 1997
- Encyonema jordanii F.W.Mills, 1934
- Encyonema juriljii D.G.Mann, 1990
- Encyonema kabaniense Rodionova & Pomazkina, 2014
- Encyonema kalbei Krammer, 1997
- Encyonema kamtschaticum Krammer, 1997
- Encyonema keshrii S.Roy, C.Radhakrishnan, J.C.Taylor, Kulikovskiy & B.Karthick, 2020
- Encyonema khursevichiae Kulikovskiy, Metzeltin & Lange-Bertalot, 2012
- Encyonema krasskei Krammer, 1997
- Encyonema kuelbsii Lange-Bertalot & Krammer, 1997
- Encyonema kukenanum Krammer, 1997
- Encyonema kultukense Rodionova & Pomazkina, 2014
- Encyonema lacustre Pantocsek, 1901
- Encyonema laeve Eichwald, 1852
- Encyonema lancettulum Krammer, 1997
- Encyonema lange-bertalotii Krammer, 1997
- Encyonema lapponicum Krammer, 1997
- Encyonema lataerolatum Krammer
- Encyonema latareolatum Krammer, 1997
- Encyonema late-ellipticum Rodionova & Pomazkina, 2014
- Encyonema latecapitatum Krammer, 1997
- Encyonema latens D.G.Mann, 1990
- Encyonema latissimum Krammer, 1997
- Encyonema latum Krammer, 1997
- Encyonema leei T.Ohtsuka, M.Hanada & Y.Nakamura, 2004
- Encyonema leibleinii W.J.Silva, R.Jahn, T.A.V.Ludwig & M.Menezes, 2013
- Encyonema lembus Krammer, 1997
- Encyonema lineolatum Krammer, 1997
- Encyonema lunatum Van Heurck, 1880
- Encyonema lunula Grunow, 1875
- Encyonema macedonicum Levkov, Metzeltin & Krstic, 2006
- Encyonema mackayiana Tempère & M.Peragallo, 1910
- Encyonema magnum Krammer, 1997
- Encyonema malaysianum Krammer, 1997
- Encyonema manguinii Krammer, 1997
- Encyonema marginestriatum Krammer & Metzeltin, 1997
- Encyonema marvanii Kulikovskiy, Lange-Bertalot, Witkowski & Dorofeyuk, 2009
- Encyonema medioasiaticum Metzeltin, Lange-Bertalot & Soninkhishig, 2009
- Encyonema meghamalaiense V.Vigheshkumar, A.Vigneshwaran, C.Radhkrishnan, N.Karthick & S.Nagaraj, 2025
- Encyonema melidense Krammer, 1997
- Encyonema menezesiae W.J.da Silva & M.G.Machado de Souza, 2015
- Encyonema menisculus Lange-Bertalot & Krammer, 2003
- Encyonema mesianum D.G.Mann, 1990
- Encyonema metzeltinii Krammer, 1997
- Encyonema mexicanum Krammer, 1997
- Encyonema microrobustum Kulikovskiy, Metzeltin & Lange-Bertalot, 2012
- Encyonema minusculus Lange-Bertalot & Krammer
- Encyonema minutiforme Krammer, 1997
- Encyonema minutum D.G.Mann, 1990
- Encyonema mirabilis Rodionova, Pomazkina & Makarevich, 2013
- Encyonema montanum Bahls, 2017
- Encyonema moragoense Krammer, 1997
- Encyonema morvanense Van de Vijver & Peeters, 2024
- Encyonema muelleri D.G.Mann, 1990
- Encyonema muscosa Z.X.Shi, 2013
- Encyonema natalense Krammer, 1997
- Encyonema neocaledonicum Krammer, 1997
- Encyonema neogracile Krammer, 1997
- Encyonema neomesianum Krammer, 1997
- Encyonema neomuelleri Krammer, 1997
- Encyonema neosubturgidum Da Silva & Menezes, 2016
- Encyonema nevadense S.Blanco, Olenici, De Vicente & F.Guerrero, 2019
- Encyonema nicafei Spaulding, 2010
- Encyonema nikulinae Kulikovskiy, Metzeltin & Lange-Bertalot, 2012
- Encyonema norvegicum Mayer, 1947
- Encyonema nylstroomense Krammer, 1997
- Encyonema oblogum Q.Liu & S.Xie, 2021
- Encyonema obscuriforme Krammer, 1997
- Encyonema obscurum D.G.Mann, 1990
- Encyonema obtusum Krammer, 1997
- Encyonema ochridanum Krammer, 1997
- Encyonema octense (R.Maillard ex Lange-Bertalot & G.Moser) Krammer, 1997
- Encyonema oestrupii Krammer & Lange-Bertalot, 1997
- Encyonema ostrobottnicum Krammer, 1997
- Encyonema panamense Lange-Bertalot & Metzeltin, 2009
- Encyonema pankowii Lange-Bertalot & Krammer, 1997
- Encyonema paradisiacum Marquardt, Wengrat & C.E.Wetzel, 2017
- Encyonema paradoxum Kützing, 1834
- Encyonema parallelum M.Peragallo, 1909
- Encyonema paratropicum Metzeltin & Lange-Bertalot, 2007
- Encyonema parvum Krammer, 1997
- Encyonema patagonicum Frenguelli, 1942
- Encyonema paucistriatum D.G.Mann, 1990
- Encyonema pediculus H.Peragallo, 1889
- Encyonema pentoniae Bahls, 2014
- Encyonema perelginense Krammer, 1997
- Encyonema pergracile Krammer, 1997
- Encyonema perlangebertalotii Kulikovskiy & Metzeltin, 2012
- Encyonema perlucida Rodionova & Pomazkina, 2014
- Encyonema perminutum Krammer, 1997
- Encyonema perpusillum D.G.Mann, 1990
- Encyonema persilesiacum Krammer, 1997
- Encyonema picinskae Metzeltin, Witkowski & Krammer, 2003
- Encyonema plenum Krammer, 1997
- Encyonema polystigmoideum Metzeltin & Krammer, 1998
- Encyonema ponspendens Moser, Lange-Bertalot & Metzeltin
- Encyonema ponteanum Krammer, 1997
- Encyonema procerum Krammer, 1997
- Encyonema proschkinae Krammer, 1997
- Encyonema prostratum Kützing, 1844
- Encyonema protractum Eichwald, 1852
- Encyonema psammophilum Krammer, 1997
- Encyonema pseudocaespitosum Levkov & Krstic, 2007
- Encyonema pseudogracile Krammer, 1997
- Encyonema pseudoincertum Krammer, 1997
- Encyonema pseudolatens Kulikovskiy, Metzeltin & Lange-Bertalot, 2012
- Encyonema pseudomuelleri Krammer, 1997
- Encyonema pseudoturgidum Pomazkina & Rodionova, 2014
- Encyonema ratpanati Llamazares, Bécares & S.Blanco, 2021
- Encyonema reflexum Holmboe, 1899
- Encyonema reichardtii D.G.Mann, 1990
- Encyonema reimeri Spaulding, J.R.Pool & S.I.Castro, 2010
- Encyonema rifelanum Krammer, 1997
- Encyonema riotecense Krammer, 1997
- Encyonema robustum Kulikovskiy, Metzeltin & Lange-Bertalot, 2012
- Encyonema rostratum Krammer, 1997
- Encyonema rugosiforme Krammer, 1997
- Encyonema rugosum D.G.Mann, 1990
- Encyonema rumrichiae Krammer, 1997
- Encyonema salamonii Metzeltin, 1998
- Encyonema sarsii Krammer, 1997
- Encyonema schimanskii Krammer, 1997
- Encyonema schneideri Krammer, 1997
- Encyonema schoemanii Krammer
- Encyonema schwabei Krammer, 1997
- Encyonema semiellipticum Rodionova & Pomazkina, 2014
- Encyonema semilanceolatum Krammer, 1997
- Encyonema shanxiense Q.Liu et al., 2021
- Encyonema sibericum Krammer & Lange-Bertalot, 1999
- Encyonema sigmoides Kützing, 1849
- Encyonema silesiacum D.G.Mann, 1990
- Encyonema simile Krammer, 1997
- Encyonema sinense Rabenhorst, 1864
- Encyonema sinensis Ralfs, 1861
- Encyonema sinicum Krammer, 1997
- Encyonema sparsipunctatum Krammer, 1997
- Encyonema sparsistriatum Marquardt, Wengrat & C.E.Wetzel, 2017
- Encyonema spechmannii Metzeltin, Lange-Bertalot & García-Rodríguez, 2003
- Encyonema spiculum D.G.Mann, 1990
- Encyonema spitsbergense Krammer, 1997
- Encyonema sprechmannii Metzeltin, Lange-Bertalot & García-Rodríguez, 2003
- Encyonema standeri Krammer, 1997
- Encyonema stigmoideum Krammer, 1997
- Encyonema stoermeri Spaulding, Pool & Castro, 2010
- Encyonema strictum Krammer, 1997
- Encyonema subalpinum D.G.Mann, 1990
- Encyonema subbrevistriatum Krammer, 1997
- Encyonema subdirectum (Maillard ex Lange-Bertalot & G. Moser) Krammer, 1997
- Encyonema subelginense Krammer, 1997
- Encyonema subgracile Krammer, 1997
- Encyonema subhinzae Krammer, 1997
- Encyonema subjavanicum Krammer, 1997
- Encyonema subkukenanum Krammer, 1997
- Encyonema sublanceolatum Krammer, Metzeltin & Lange-Bertalot, 1997
- Encyonema sublangebertalotii Lange-Bertalot & M.Cantonati, 2010
- Encyonema submenisculus Krammer & Lange-Bertalot, 2003
- Encyonema subminutum Krammer & Lange-Bertalot, 1997
- Encyonema subnorvegicum Krammer, 1997
- Encyonema subobscurum Krammer, 1997
- Encyonema subperpusillum Krammer, 1997
- Encyonema subprocerum Zaova & al., 2025
- Encyonema subrostratum Krammer, 1997
- Encyonema subtenerum Lange-Bertalot & Krammer, 1998
- Encyonema subtenuissimum Krammer, 1997
- Encyonema subtriangulum Krammer, 2003
- Encyonema subtriste Krammer, 1997
- Encyonema subturgidum Frenguelli, 1942
- Encyonema subturgidum D.G.Mann, 1990
- Encyonema subventricosum Krammer, 1997
- Encyonema supergracile Krammer & Lange-Bertalot, 1997
- Encyonema tapajoz Krammer, 1997
- Encyonema tasmaniense Krammer, 1997
- Encyonema temperei Krammer, 1997
- Encyonema tenerum Krammer, 1997
- Encyonema tengganoensis Krammer, 1997
- Encyonema tenue Marquardt, Wengrat & C.E.Wetzel, 2017
- Encyonema tenuicephalum Lange-Bertalot & Krammer, 1998
- Encyonema tenuissimum D.G.Mann, 1990
- Encyonema thermale Krammer, 1997
- Encyonema theronii Krammer, 1997
- Encyonema thioense Lange-Bertalot & Krammer, 1998
- Encyonema triangulatum Kützing
- Encyonema trianguliforme Krammer, 1997
- Encyonema triangulum (Ehrenberg) Kützing, 1849
- Encyonema trifolium Kulikovskiy, Metzeltin & Lange-Bertalot, 2012
- Encyonema triste Krammer, 1997
- Encyonema tropicum Metzeltin & Krammer, 1997
- Encyonema truncatum Krammer, 1997
- Encyonema turgidum Grunow, 1875
- Encyonema umara Krammer, 1997
- Encyonema undulatum Z.X.Shi, 2013
- Encyonema undulatum Rodionova & Pomazkina, 2014
- Encyonema ungeri Grunow, 1875
- Encyonema unipunctatum Kulikovskiy, Metzeltin & Lange-Bertalot, 2012
- Encyonema usoltsevae Kulikovskiy, Metzeltin & Lange-Bertalot, 2012
- Encyonema validum Pantocsek, 1901
- Encyonema vandammeanum Van de Vijver & Wilfert, 2024
- Encyonema vanoyei Krammer, 1997
- Encyonema variabile Metzeltin & Lange-Bertalot, 2007
- Encyonema venezolanum Krammer, 1997
- Encyonema ventricosum Grunow, 1875
- Encyonema venustum I.W.Bishop & Spaulding, 2018
- Encyonema volkii Rumrich, Krammer & Lange-Bertalot 1997
- Encyonema vulgare Krammer, 1997
- Encyonema wallaceanum Krammer, 1997
- Encyonema willeyorum Bahls, 2014
- Encyonema wojtalae Metzeltin, 1998
- Encyonema wydrzyckae Lange-Bertalot & Krammer, 2003
- Encyonema yarrense A.W.F.Schmidt, 1881
- Encyonema yellowstonianum Krammer, 1997
- Encyonema yucatanense Metzeltin & Krammer, 1998
- Encyonema yuwadeeanum Yana & Mayama, 2015
