= Fallacia =

Fallacia may refer to:

- Fallacia (beetle), a genus of beetles in the family Cerambycidae
- Fallacia (alga), a genus of algae in the family Sellaphoraceae
