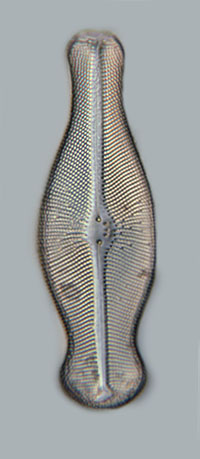
- Didymosphenia geminata

Scientific classification
- Domain: Eukaryota
- Clade: Diaphoretickes
- Clade: SAR
- Clade: Stramenopiles
- Phylum: Gyrista
- Subphylum: Ochrophytina
- Class: Bacillariophyceae
- Order: Cymbellales
- Family: Cymbellaceae
- Genus: Didymosphenia; M.Schmidt, 1899

= Didymosphenia =

Genus of algae

Didymosphenia is a genus of diatoms belonging to the family Cymbellaceae.

The genus has almost cosmopolitan distribution.

Species:

- Didymosphenia fossilis Horikawa & Okuno, 1944
- Didymosphenia geminata (Lyngbye) M.Schmidt, 1899
- Didymosphenia lineata Skabichevskii, 1983
- Didymosphenia pumila Metzeltin & Lange-Bertalot, 1995
- Didymosphenia sublinearis Shirshov, 1935
- Didymosphenia tatrensis T.Mrozinska, J.Czerwik-Marcinkowska & M.Gradzinski, 2006
