= Navicella (diatom) =

Scientific classification
- Domain: Eukaryota
- Clade: Sar
- Clade: Stramenopiles
- Division: Ochrophyta
- Clade: Diatomeae
- Class: Bacillariophyceae
- Order: Cymbellales
- Family: Cymbellaceae
- Genus: Navicella; K.Kramer 1997

Species
- Navicella pusilla (Grunow) Krammer

Genus of single-celled organisms

Navicella is a genus of diatoms in the family Cymbellaceae.
