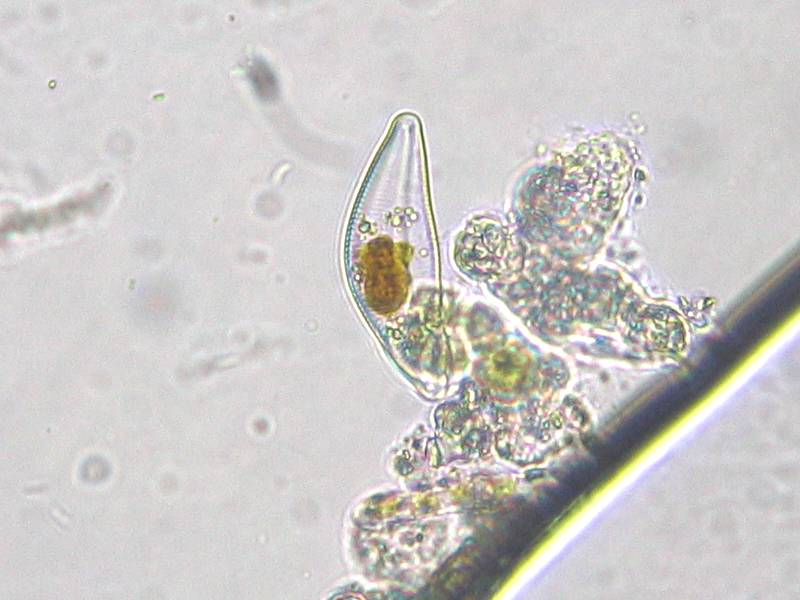

Scientific classification
- Domain: Eukaryota
- Clade: Diaphoretickes
- Clade: SAR
- Clade: Stramenopiles
- Phylum: Gyrista
- Subphylum: Ochrophytina
- Class: Bacillariophyceae
- Order: Cymbellales
- Family: Cymbellaceae
- Genus: Cymbella; C.Agardh, 1830

Species
- See text

= Cymbella =

Genus of single-celled organisms

Cymbella is a diatom genus in the family Cymbellaceae including over 800 species. The type species for this genus is Cymbella cymbiformis Agardh 1830. Cymbella species are found in freshwater environments.

== Species ==
Cymbella abbottii
Cymbella aculeata
Cymbella acuta
Cymbella acuta
Cymbella acutea
Cymbella adnata
Cymbella advena
Cymbella aequaloides
Cymbella affiniformis
Cymbella affinis
Cymbella alaskana
Cymbella algida
Cymbella alpestris
Cymbella alpinoides
Cymbella amelieana
Cymbella americana
Cymbella amoyensis
Cymbella amphioxys
Cymbella amplificata
Cymbella ampullacea
Cymbella andranokelyna
Cymbella angustissima
Cymbella ankobraensis
Cymbella antarctica
Cymbella antogaryanum
Cymbella arakawana
Cymbella arctica
Cymbella arctissima
Cymbella aspera
Cymbella aubertii
Cymbella aueri
Cymbella australica
Cymbella avenacea
Cymbella baicalensis
Cymbella balatonis
Cymbella bastowii
Cymbella batthyanyiana
Cymbella beherei
Cymbella behrei
Cymbella bengalensis
Cymbella bengaliformis
Cymbella bernensis
Cymbella beverleiana
Cymbella bharatensis
Cymbella bicapitata
Cymbella bistritzae
Cymbella blancheana
Cymbella boeckii
Cymbella borapetensis
Cymbella borealis
Cymbella borgei
Cymbella botellus
Cymbella bouleana
Cymbella bourrellyi
Cymbella brasiliana
Cymbella brebissoniana
Cymbella brevicostata
Cymbella brevieri
Cymbella breweriana
Cymbella bruyanti
Cymbella buechleri
Cymbella caespitosa
Cymbella caespitosum
Cymbella calida
Cymbella cantalense
Cymbella cantonatii
Cymbella capitata
Cymbella capitata
Cymbella capitata
Cymbella capitata
Cymbella capitellata
Cymbella capricornis
Cymbella carassius
Cymbella carenageana
Cymbella cassidula
Cymbella cayeuxi
Cymbella chandolensis
Cymbella charetoni
Cymbella charrua
Cymbella chasei
Cymbella chyzerii
Cymbella cimbebasiae
Cymbella cistula
Cymbella cistuliformis
Cymbella cistuloides
Cymbella claasseniae
Cymbella clementis
Cymbella clericii
Cymbella cleve-eulerae
Cymbella coamoensis
Cymbella coffeaeformis
Cymbella compacta
Cymbella conifera
Cymbella convexa
Cymbella copulata
Cymbella costata
Cymbella coudertii
Cymbella couleensis
Cymbella crassa
Cymbella crassistigmata
Cymbella creguti
Cymbella criophila
Cymbella cristata
Cymbella cryptocephala
Cymbella cucumis
Cymbella cursiformis
Cymbella curta
Cymbella curvata
Cymbella cymbiformis
Cymbella dadwinensis
Cymbella davidsonii
Cymbella deblockii
Cymbella delauneyi
Cymbella delecta
Cymbella delicatissima
Cymbella deltaica
Cymbella descripta
Cymbella designata
Cymbella dianae
Cymbella dicephala
Cymbella digitataradiata
Cymbella directa
Cymbella disparestriata
Cymbella disparestriata
Cymbella diversa
Cymbella diversiforamina
Cymbella diversiformis
Cymbella diversistigmata
Cymbella dobsonensis
Cymbella dorsenotata
Cymbella dorsirostrata
Cymbella dubia
Cymbella dubitabilis
Cymbella dubitata
Cymbella dubravicensis
Cymbella dumbeana
Cymbella duplopunctata
Cymbella eburnea
Cymbella edelbergii
Cymbella elegans
Cymbella elizabethana
Cymbella elliptica
Cymbella encyonema
Cymbella epithemoides
Cymbella erdobenyiana
Cymbella estonica
Cymbella euricephala
Cymbella eurycephala
Cymbella excavata
Cymbella excisa
Cymbella excisiformis
Cymbella exigua
Cymbella expecta
Cymbella explanata
Cymbella failaisensis
Cymbella falaisensis
Cymbella farakulumensis
Cymbella fennica
Cymbella fonticolaÿ
Cymbella fornicata
Cymbella foucaudi
Cymbella frenguellii
Cymbella frieseana
Cymbella frigida
Cymbella fuegensis
Cymbella fulva
Cymbella fulva
Cymbella fusidium
Cymbella gadjiana
Cymbella gallaudi
Cymbella gasumanni
Cymbella gauemannii
Cymbella geddiana
Cymbella gemeinhardtii
Cymbella geminata
Cymbella gibba
Cymbella gibba
Cymbella gibberula
Cymbella gibberula
Cymbella gibbosa
Cymbella giluwensis
Cymbella girodii
Cymbella glacialis
Cymbella gondwana
Cymbella gonzalvesii
Cymbella graciliformis
Cymbella gracilis
Cymbella gracillima
Cymbella grata
Cymbella gregorii
Cymbella groenlandica
Cymbella grossestriata
Cymbella guettingeri
Cymbella halophila
Cymbella hantzschiana
Cymbella harioti
Cymbella haslundii
Cymbella hebetata
Cymbella hebridica
Cymbella hedinii
Cymbella heimii
Cymbella helmandensis
Cymbella helmckei
Cymbella helvetica
Cymbella heterogibbosa
Cymbella heteropleura
Cymbella hevesensis
Cymbella hillardii
Cymbella hofmanniae
Cymbella holmenii
Cymbella hopkirkii
Cymbella hugoni
Cymbella hugonii
Cymbella hulensis
Cymbella hungarica
Cymbella hurelli
Cymbella hustedtii
Cymbella hyalina
Cymbella hyalina
Cymbella inca
Cymbella incertastriata
Cymbella incrassata
Cymbella incrassata
Cymbella incurvata
Cymbella ineaqualis
Cymbella inelegans
Cymbella inflata
Cymbella inflata
Cymbella inflexa
Cymbella ingstadii
Cymbella integra
Cymbella intermedia
Cymbella ioica
Cymbella islandica
Cymbella italica
Cymbella jalgaonensis
Cymbella janischii
Cymbella janischii
Cymbella jimboi
Cymbella jolmolungmensis
Cymbella jonssoni
Cymbella jordani
Cymbella jordanii
Cymbella kaingensis
Cymbella kappii
Cymbella kavnensis
Cymbella kawamurae
Cymbella kemiana
Cymbella kerguelenensis
Cymbella kiamensis
Cymbella knuthii
Cymbella kochii
Cymbella koeiei
Cymbella koidzumiana
Cymbella kolbei
Cymbella koreana
Cymbella krasskei
Cymbella kriegeri
Cymbella lacus-karluki
Cymbella lacustre
Cymbella lacustris
Cymbella laetevirens
Cymbella laevis
Cymbella lanceolata
Cymbella lancettula
Cymbella lancettuliformis
Cymbella lange-bertalotii
Cymbella langii
Cymbella latarea
Cymbella latefasciata
Cymbella laubyi
Cymbella laurenti
Cymbella laxa
Cymbella lecomtei
Cymbella lembus
Cymbella leptoceroides
Cymbella leptoceros
Cymbella leptoceros
Cymbella lesothensis
Cymbella levyi
Cymbella lindheimeri
Cymbella lindsayana
Cymbella lindsayana
Cymbella linearis
Cymbella lineata
Cymbella lineolatea
Cymbella ljungneri
Cymbella loczyi
Cymbella lunula
Cymbella madagascariensis
Cymbella maggiana
Cymbella maharashtrensis
Cymbella maillardi
Cymbella maliana
Cymbella malinvaudi
Cymbella mangini
Cymbella marathwadensis
Cymbella margaritifera
Cymbella marginata
Cymbella marginatum
Cymbella marina
Cymbella marnieri
Cymbella marnierii
Cymbella maxima
Cymbella mendosa
Cymbella menisculis
Cymbella metzeltinii
Cymbella mexicana
Cymbella microstoma
Cymbella minor
Cymbella minuscula
Cymbella minutissima
Cymbella miocenica
Cymbella mirabilis
Cymbella modicepunctata
Cymbella moelleriana
Cymbella mongolica
Cymbella montana
Cymbella moragoensis
Cymbella muralis
Cymbella muscicola
Cymbella nagpurensis
Cymbella navicula
Cymbella naviculacea
Cymbella naviculiformis
Cymbella naviculoides
Cymbella naviculoides
Cymbella neglecta
Cymbella nekliaiana
Cymbella nekliaiensis
Cymbella nekliaiensis
Cymbella neocaledonica
Cymbella neocistula
Cymbella neogena
Cymbella neoleptoceros
Cymbella neptuni
Cymbella nerei
Cymbella neupauerii
Cymbella neuquina
Cymbella nipponica
Cymbella niupanensis
Cymbella nodosa
Cymbella nordenskioeldii
Cymbella norvegica
Cymbella novazeelandiana
Cymbella novilunaris
Cymbella nurnussiensis
Cymbella nylstroomensis
Cymbella obtusiformis
Cymbella obtusiuscula
Cymbella octensis
Cymbella oestrupii
Cymbella oliffii
Cymbella oligocenica
Cymbella olivacea
Cymbella omaniana
Cymbella oncliniorum
Cymbella operculata
Cymbella orientalis
Cymbella orsiniana
Cymbella osmanabadensis
Cymbella ovalis
Cymbella pachycephala
Cymbella pachyptera
Cymbella pagesi
Cymbella palpebralis
Cymbella palustris
Cymbella panjaoensis
Cymbella pankowii
Cymbella pantocsekii
Cymbella parasitica
Cymbella parva
Cymbella parva
Cymbella parviformis
Cymbella parvula
Cymbella parvulissima
Cymbella patagonica
Cymbella pauli
Cymbella pavlovi
Cymbella pedunculata
Cymbella pelagica
Cymbella peraffinis
Cymbella peraffinis
Cymbella peragalloi
Cymbella peraspera
Cymbella percapitata
Cymbella percymbiformis
Cymbella perdurrans
Cymbella perfecta
Cymbella perfossilis
Cymbella perjaponica
Cymbella pernodensis
Cymbella pernodensis
Cymbella perparva
Cymbella pervarians
Cymbella philadelphica
Cymbella picta
Cymbella pisciculus
Cymbella placentula
Cymbella plena
Cymbella plutonica
Cymbella polita
Cymbella poretzkyi
Cymbella porrecta
Cymbella powaiana
Cymbella praeclara
Cymbella praerupta
Cymbella praetumida
Cymbella pretoriensis
Cymbella procera
Cymbella proschkinae
Cymbella prostrata
Cymbella protracta
Cymbella proxima
Cymbella psammophila
Cymbella pseudo-lanceolata
Cymbella pseudo-turgidula
Cymbella pseudoalpinioides
Cymbella pseudocuspidata
Cymbella pseudodelicatula
Cymbella pseudohybrida
Cymbella pseudoincerta
Cymbella pseudonorvegica
Cymbella pseudostodderi
Cymbella pseudotumida
Cymbella quinquepunctata
Cymbella rabenhorstii
Cymbella radiosa
Cymbella radiosa
Cymbella rainierensis
Cymbella rakocziana
Cymbella rapsonii
Cymbella rarissima
Cymbella raytonensis
Cymbella recta
Cymbella recta
Cymbella recurva
Cymbella reducta
Cymbella reniformis
Cymbella reviersiana
Cymbella rheophila
Cymbella rhodesi
Cymbella rhodesica
Cymbella rhomboidea
Cymbella rivularis
Cymbella robertii
Cymbella robusta
Cymbella rosenkrantzii
Cymbella rostrata
Cymbella rotundata
Cymbella rumrichae
Cymbella runcina
Cymbella ruttnerii
Cymbella sabzewarensis
Cymbella sagarensis
Cymbella salina
Cymbella salinarum
Cymbella sanctae-margaritae
Cymbella sarsii
Cymbella saxicola
Cymbella scherffeliana
Cymbella schilleri
Cymbella schimanskii
Cymbella schmidtii
Cymbella schubartii
Cymbella schubartoides
Cymbella schwabei
Cymbella schweickerdtii
Cymbella scotica
Cymbella scotlandica
Cymbella scutariana
Cymbella semicircularis
Cymbella semielliptica
Cymbella semircularis
Cymbella semisymmetrica
Cymbella septentrionalis
Cymbella sibirica
Cymbella simonsenii
Cymbella simplex
Cymbella sinensis
Cymbella sinica
Cymbella skabitschevskyi
Cymbella skvortzovii
Cymbella sliacsensis
Cymbella smithii
Cymbella speciosa
Cymbella sphaerophora
Cymbella splendens
Cymbella splendens
Cymbella standeri
Cymbella staubii
Cymbella stigmaphora
Cymbella stodderi
Cymbella strontiana
Cymbella sturii
Cymbella stuxbergii
Cymbella suavis
Cymbella subantarctica
Cymbella subarctica
Cymbella subaspera
Cymbella subcapitata
Cymbella subcistula
Cymbella subconstricta
Cymbella subcryptocephala
Cymbella subcymbiformis
Cymbella subdirecta
Cymbella subdirecta
Cymbella subhelvetica
Cymbella subincerta
Cymbella subkolbei
Cymbella sublata
Cymbella sublata
Cymbella subleptoceros
Cymbella subovalis
Cymbella subparviformis
Cymbella subsymmetrica
Cymbella subtruncata
Cymbella subturgidula
Cymbella subventricosa
Cymbella subwulffii
Cymbella subzewarensis
Cymbella suecica
Cymbella sumatrensis
Cymbella superparva
Cymbella symmetrica
Cymbella szontaghii
Cymbella tainensis
Cymbella takoradiensis
Cymbella tartuensis
Cymbella tasmaniensis
Cymbella tatrensis
Cymbella tengganoensis
Cymbella tenuis
Cymbella terrafuegiana
Cymbella theronii
Cymbella thienemanni
Cymbella tibetana
Cymbella ticinensis
Cymbella towoetensis
Cymbella transsilvanica
Cymbella transvaalensis
Cymbella triangulata
Cymbella triangulum
Cymbella triconfusa
Cymbella tristis
Cymbella tropica
Cymbella truncata
Cymbella truncata
Cymbella tsoneka
Cymbella tsonka
Cymbella tumescens
Cymbella tumida
Cymbella turgida
Cymbella turgidula
Cymbella turgiduliformis
Cymbella uebelackeri
Cymbella uenoi
Cymbella ulensis
Cymbella umara
Cymbella undulata
Cymbella unipunctata
Cymbella valaiseana
Cymbella valida
Cymbella van-oyei
Cymbella vanoyei
Cymbella variabilis
Cymbella variostriata
Cymbella vaszaryi
Cymbella vegeta
Cymbella venezuelana
Cymbella vestigiana
Cymbella vidarbhensis
Cymbella volkii
Cymbella von-hauseniae
Cymbella vulgata
Cymbella weslawskii
Cymbella wittrockii
Cymbella wolffii
Cymbella wolterecki
Cymbella yabe
Cymbella yarrensis
Cymbella zambesiana
