= Navicella =

Navicella, an Italian word meaning "little ship", may refer to:

- Navicella (diatom), a genus of diatoms in the family Cymbellaceae
- Navicella (fungus), a genus of fungi in the family Massariaceae
- Septaria (gastropod), a genus of fresh and brackish water snails where Navicella is a synonym
- Navicella (mosaic), a large mosaic after Giotto of a "Ship of the Church" which dominated the porch of Old Saint Peter's in Rome, or similar subjects in art
