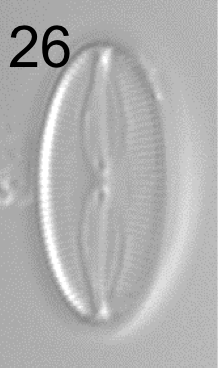
- Fallacia pygmaea

Scientific classification
- Domain: Eukaryota
- Clade: Sar
- Clade: Stramenopiles
- Division: Ochrophyta
- Clade: Bacillariophyta
- Class: Bacillariophyceae
- Order: Sellaphorales
- Family: Sellaphoraceae
- Genus: Fallacia; A.J.Stickle & D.G.Mann, 1990

= Fallacia (alga) =

Genus of diatoms

Fallacia is a genus of diatoms belonging to the family Sellaphoraceae.

The genus has cosmopolitan distribution.

Species:

- Fallacia arenaria K.Sabbe & W.Vyverman, 1999
- Fallacia carpentariae Hallegraeff & Burford, 1996
- Fallacia cassubiae Witkowski, 1991
