= Gametangiogamy =

The steps of life cycle of fungus Taphrina, with karyogamy (4) and gametangiogamy (A)

Gametangiogamy is the fusion or copulation of whole gametangia in certain members of the phyla Zygomycota and Ascomycota. The copulated union of multinuclear cells is followed after a more or less long period dikaryophase, by a pairwise fusion (karyogamy) of sexually different nuclei.

In this case, karyogamy takes place simultaneously between the nuclei of many pairs of nuclei, not as in gametogamy between two gametic nuclei (polyfertilization).

== See also ==
- Gametogamy
- Karyogamy
- Fertilization
