= Gametogamy =

Gametogamy is sexual fusion – copulation or fertlization – of two single-celled gametes of different sex and the union of their gamete nuclei (and corresponding extranuclear structures) giving the zygote nucleus, as well as whole zygotic content.

According to its morphology, size and other properties, most forms of gametogamy are as follows:

- Isogamy (Ancient Greek ισο - iso= "equal + γάμος gámos = "marriage") – in cell biology – is a type of sexual reproduction that includes gametes of similar morphological similar shape and size, with difference in general only in genome content and gene expression in one or more mating-type regions. Both gametes look alike, and they cannot be classified as "male" or "female." Actually, organisms characterized as isogametic have different mating types, most commonly noted as "+" and "−" strains, although in some species there are more than two mating types (designated by numbers or letters). Izogamic fertilization includes two gametes fusion, when different mating types form a zygote.
- Heterogamy (Ancient Greek ἕτερος heteros = "other, another" + γάμος gámos = "marriage") – in cell biology – is a synonym of anisogamy, involving differently sized male and female gametes produced by different sexes or mating types in a species.
- Apogamy (Ancient Greek αρο - apo = from, of + γάμος gámos) – in botany – is defined as a replacement of normal sexual reproduction by asexual propagation, without fertilization. The fruits can be developed without fertilization. In this case, embryo occurs without fertilization or without the presence of pollen. A special form of apogamia is when the embryo develops klijavo seed. It is the phenomenon called parthenogenesis. So, fruits contain seeds, which although not fertilized, maintaining viability. In this case the embryo or germ arises from unfertilized oocyte. This phenomenon is widespread example in nuts.

From such seeds develop plants whose features are identical properties of mothers from which the seed was taken.

== See also ==
- Isogamy
- Heterogamy
- Apomixis
