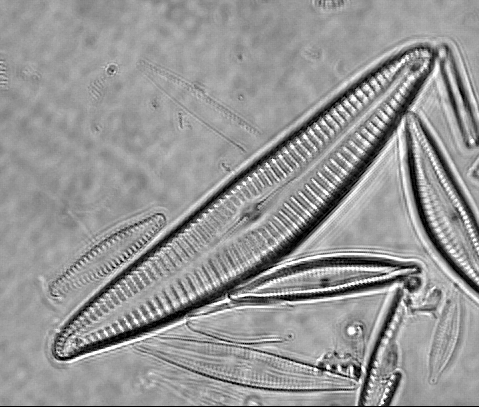
- Cymbella

Scientific classification
- Domain: Eukaryota
- Clade: Diaphoretickes
- Clade: Sar
- Clade: Stramenopiles
- Phylum: Gyrista
- Subphylum: Ochrophytina
- Class: Bacillariophyceae
- Order: Cymbellales
- Family: Cymbellaceae; Grev.

= Cymbellaceae =

Family of single-celled organisms

The Cymbellaceae are a diatom family in the order Cymbellales.

== Genera ==
Genera include:

- Alveocymba Kapustin, Kulikovskiy & Kociolek in Kapustin et al., 2020
- Brebissonia Grunow, 1860
- Celebesia D. Kapustin, Kulikovskiy & Kociolek, 2017
- Cymbella C. Agardh, 1830
- Cymbellafalsa Lange-Bertalot & Metzeltin, H. Lange-Bertalot & S. Nergui, 2009
- Cymbopleura (Krammer) Krammer in Lange-Bertalot & Genkal, 1999
- Delicatophycus M.J.Wynne, 2019
- Didymosphenia Mart. Schmidt et al., 1899
- Encyonema Kütz., 1833
- Encyonopsis K. Krammer, 1997
- Gomphocymbellopsis Krammer, 2003
- Karthickia Kociolek, Glushchenko & Kulikovskiy, 2019
- Khursevichia Kulikovskiy, Lange-Bertalot & Metzeltin, 2012
- Kurtkrammeria L. Bahls, 2015
- Navicella Krammer, 1997
- Navicymbula Krammer, 2003
- Ochigma Kulikovskiy, Lange-Bertalot & Metzeltin, 2012
- Oricymba Jüttner, Krammer, E.J.Cox, Van de Vijver & Tuji et al., 2010
- Paraplaconeis Lange-Bertalot & A.Z.Wojtal, 2012
- Placoneis C. Mereschkowsky, 1903
- Pseudencyonema K. Krammer, 1997
- Pseudocymbopleura Pomazkina & Rodionova, 2014
- Vladinikolaevia Kulikovskiy, Glushchenko, Y. Liu et Kociolek in Kulikovskiy et al.,2022
- Yasnitskya Rodionova & Pomazkina, 2014
