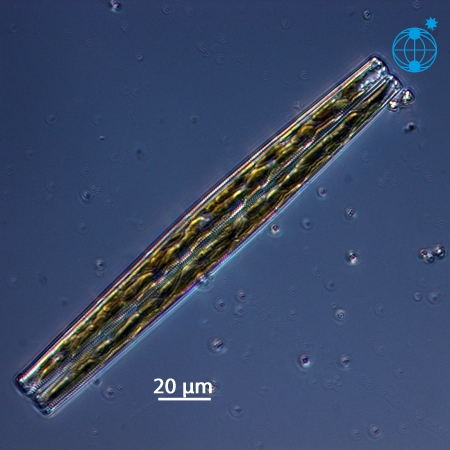
- Bacillaria paxillifera

Scientific classification
- Domain: Eukaryota
- Clade: Sar
- Clade: Stramenopiles
- Division: Ochrophyta
- Clade: Bacillariophyta
- Class: Bacillariophyceae; Haeckel 1878, emend. Adl et al. 2019

Subclasses and families
- Urneidophycidae; Fragilariophycidae; Bacillariophycidae; Striatellaceae

= Bacillariophyceae =

Bacillariophyceae Temporal range: Cretaceous–Recent

Class of diatoms

Bacillariophyceae is a class of diatoms. Previously, this class was equivalent to Diatomeae, the taxonomic name for all diatoms. However, due to both the known and estimated diversity of diatoms, since 2019 they have been expanded to several classes. In particular, Bacillariophyceae was given the following modified diagnosis:

"Chain-forming, colonial or solitary; valve outline almost always bipolar; valve pattern organized bilaterally about an elongate axial rib (sternum), as in a feather; valve structure simple or chambered; rimoportulae generally only one or two per valve or none, sometimes accompanied (or replaced?) by special slits (the 'raphe') involved in motility; sexual reproduction involving gametangiogamy and almost always with gametes of equal size (although sometimes with behavioral differentiation and/or morphological differences); perizonium generally differentiated into two distinct series, transverse and longitudinal; chloroplasts usually only one, two or a few and large, less often many and small."
