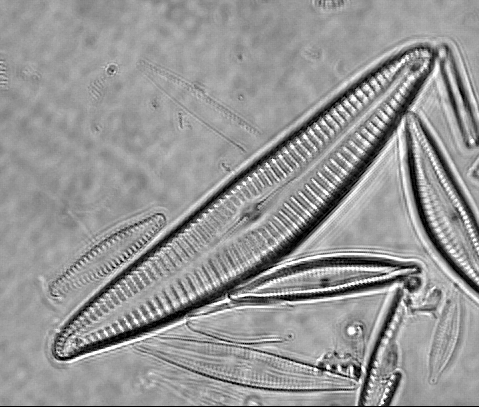
- Cymbella

Scientific classification
- Domain: Eukaryota
- Clade: Sar
- Clade: Stramenopiles
- Division: Ochrophyta
- Clade: Bacillariophyta
- Class: Bacillariophyceae
- Order: Cymbellales; D.G.Mann

= Cymbellales =

Order of single-celled organisms

The Cymbellales are a diatom order in the class Bacillariophyceae. They include the following families:

- Anomoeoneidaceae
- Cymbellaceae
- Gomphonemataceae
- Rhoicospheniaceae
