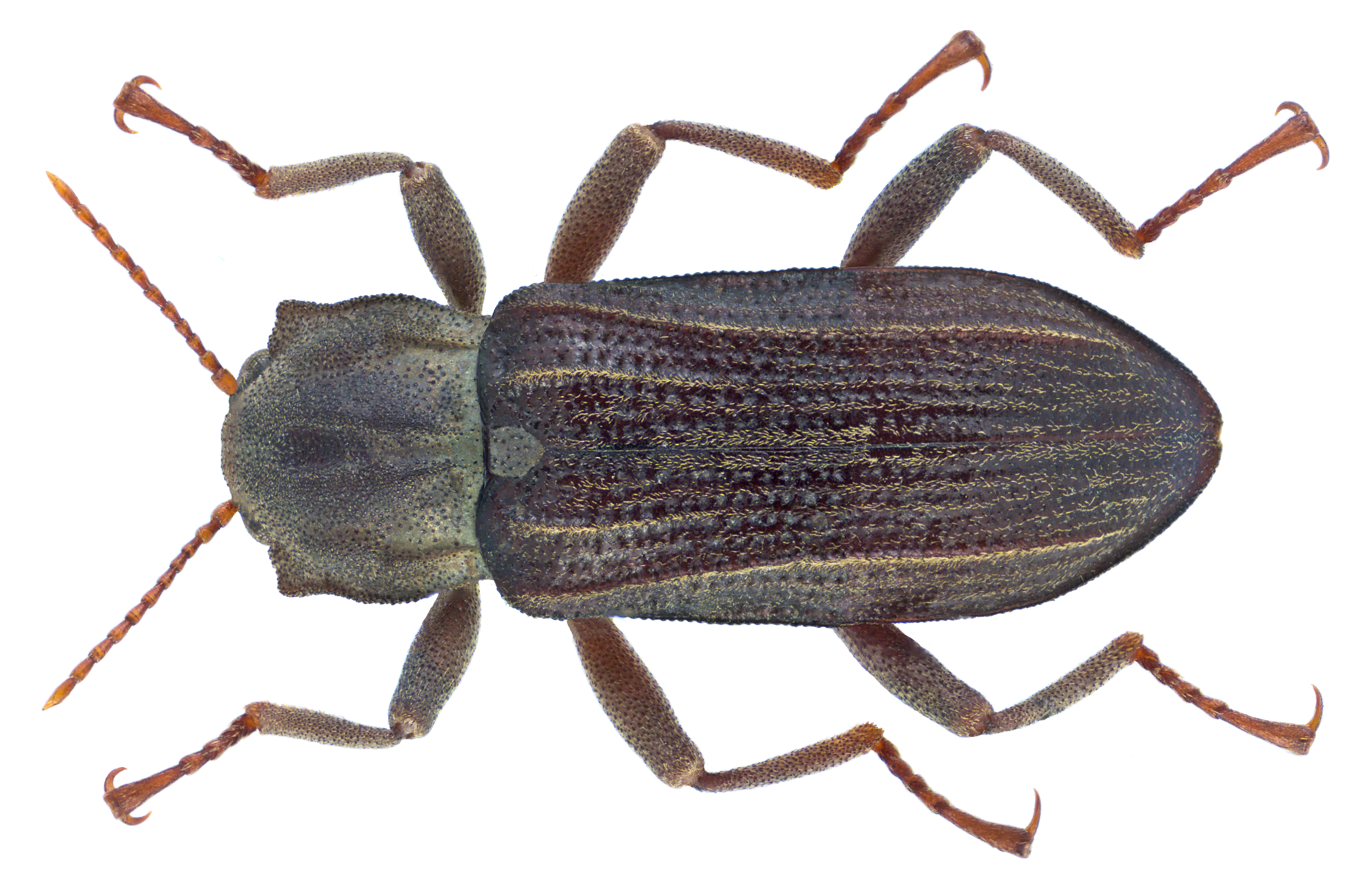
- Stenelmis canaliculata

Scientific classification
- Domain: Eukaryota
- Kingdom: Animalia
- Phylum: Arthropoda
- Class: Insecta
- Order: Coleoptera
- Suborder: Polyphaga
- Infraorder: Elateriformia
- Family: Elmidae
- Subfamily: Elminae
- Tribe: Elmini; Curtis, 1830

= Elmini =

Tribe of beetles

Elmini is a tribe of riffle beetles in the family Elmidae. There are more than 90 genera and 1,200 described species in North America.

== Genera ==
These 96 genera belong to the tribe Elmini:

- Aesobia Jäch, 1982
- Ampumixis Sanderson, 1954
- Anommatelmis Spangler, 1981
- Aspidelmis Delève, 1954
- Atractelmis Chandler, 1954
- Austrelmis Brown, 1984
- Austrolimnius Carter & Zeck, 1929
- Bryelmis Barr, 2011
- Cephalolimnius Delève, 1973
- Cleptelmis Sanderson, 1954
- Coxelmis Carter & Zeck, 1929
- Ctenelmis Delève, 1964
- Cylloepus Erichson, 1847
- Dubiraphia Sanderson, 1954
- Dupophilus Mulsant & Rey, 1872
- Elachistelmis Maier, 2012
- Elmidolia Fairmaire, 1879
- Elmis Latreille, 1802
- Elpidemis Delève, 1964
- Epodelmis Hinton, 1973
- Esolus Mulsant & Rey, 1872
- Eumicrodinodes Delève, 1965
- Exolimnius Delève, 1954
- Gonielmis Sanderson, 1954
- Graphelmis Delève, 1968
- Grouvellinus Champion, 1923
- Gyrelmis Hinton, 1940
- Hedyselmis Hinton, 1976
- Helminthocharis Grouvelle, 1906
- Helminthopsis Grouvelle, 1906
- Heterelmis Sharp, 1882
- Heterlimnius Hinton, 1935
- Hexacylloepus Hinton, 1940
- Hintonelmis Spangler, 1966
- Holcelmis Hinton, 1973
- Huleechius Brown, 1981
- Ilamelmis Delève, 1973
- Jolyelmis Spangler & Faitoute, 1991
- Kingolus Carter & Zeck, 1929
- Lathridelmis Delève, 1965
- Leielmis Delève, 1964
- Lemalelmis Spangler, 1981
- Leptelmis Sharp, 1888
- Limnius Illiger, 1802
- Lobelmis Fairmaire, 1898
- Luchoelmis Spangler & Staines, 2004
- Ludyella Reitter, 1899
- Macrelmis Motschulsky, 1859
- Macronychoides Champion, 1923
- Microcylloepus Hinton, 1935
- Microdinodes Grouvelle, 1906
- Narpus Casey, 1893
- Neocylloepus Brown, 1970
- Neoelmis Musgrave, 1935
- Neolimnius Hinton, 1939
- Neoriohelmis Nomura, 1958
- Nomuraelmis Satô, 1964
- Notelmis Hinton, 1941
- Notriolus Carter & Zeck, 1929
- Ohiya Jäch, 1982
- Onychelmis Hinton, 1941
- Oolimnius Hinton, 1939
- Optioservus Sanderson, 1954
- Ordobrevia Sanderson, 1953
- Orientelmis Shepard, 1998
- Oulimnius des Gozis, 1886
- Pachyelmis Fairmaire, 1898
- Pagelmis Spangler, 1981
- Peloriolus Delève, 1964
- Pilielmis Hinton, 1971
- Podelmis Hinton, 1941
- Portelmis Sanderson, 1953
- Pseudamophilus Bollow, 1940
- Pseudancyronyx Bertrand & Steffan, 1963
- Pseudelmidolia Delève, 1963
- Pseudomacronychus Grouvelle, 1906
- Rhizelmis Chandler, 1954
- Riolus Mulsant & Rey, 1872
- Rudielmis Jäch & Boukal, 1995
- Simsonia Carter & Zeck, 1929
- Sinelmis Satô & Kishimoto, 2001
- Sphragidelmis Delève, 1964
- Stegoelmis Hinton, 1939
- Stenelmis Dufour, 1835
- Stenhelmoides Grouvelle, 1908
- Stethelmis Hinton, 1945
- Taprobanelmis Delève, 1973
- Tolmerelmis Hinton, 1972
- Tolriolus Hinton, 1940
- Trachelminthopsis Delève, 1965
- Tropidelmis Delève, 1964
- Tyletelmis Hinton, 1972
- Typhloelmis Barr in Barr, Gibson & Diaz, 2015
- Unguisaeta Jäch, 1982
- Xenelmis Hinton, 1936
- Xenelmoides Hinton, 1936
