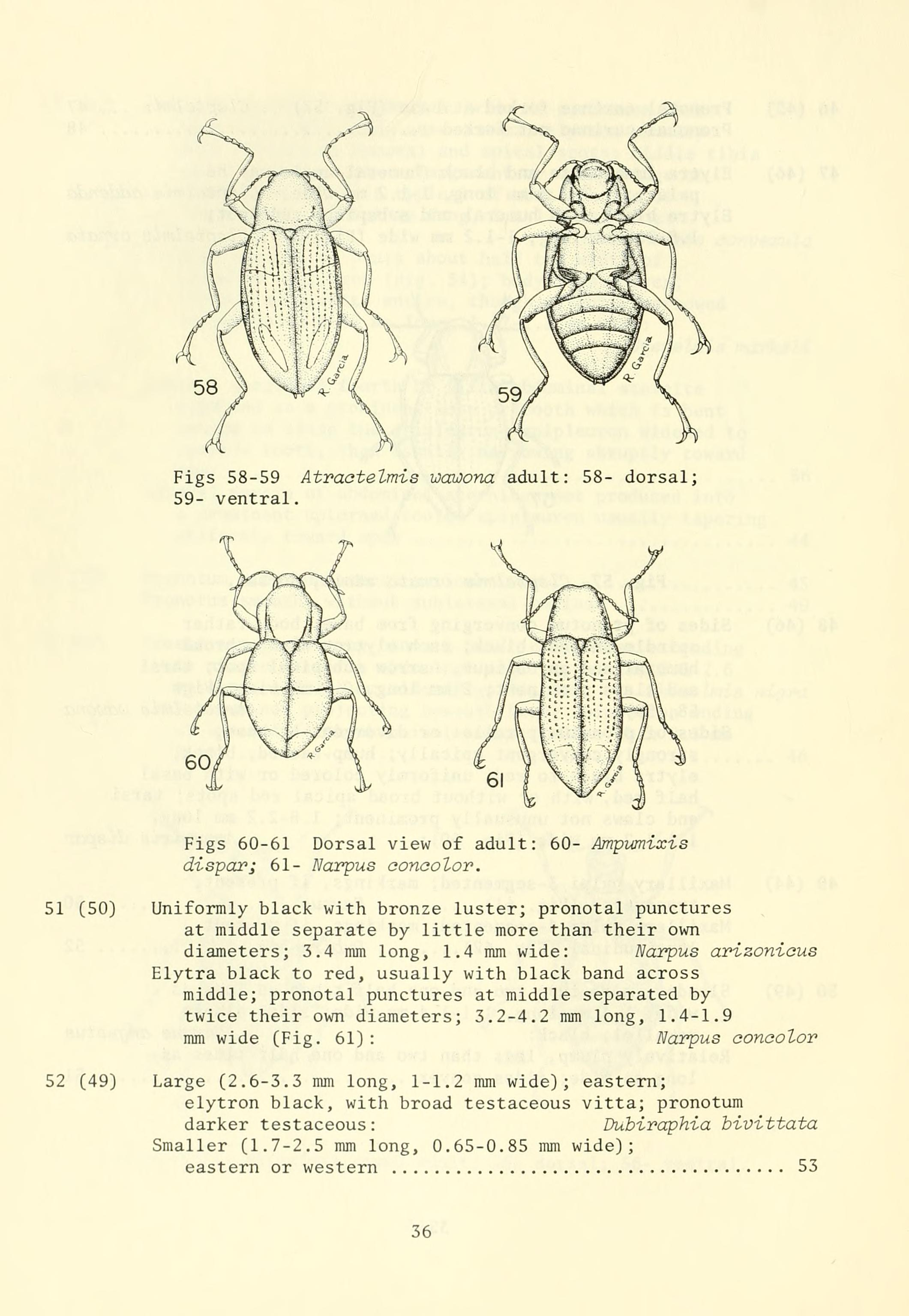
- Narpus concolar on fig N.0 61

Scientific classification
- Kingdom: Animalia
- Phylum: Arthropoda
- Class: Insecta
- Order: Coleoptera
- Suborder: Polyphaga
- Infraorder: Elateriformia
- Family: Elmidae
- Subfamily: Elminae
- Tribe: Elmini
- Genus: Narpus
- Species: N. concolor

Binomial name
- Narpus concolor (LeConte, 1881)

Synonyms
- Elmis concolor LeConte, 1881; Helmis soluta Brown, 1933; Narpus solutus (Brown, 1933)

= Narpus concolor =

Species of beetles

Narpus concolor is a species of riffle beetle in the family Elmidae. It is found in North America.
