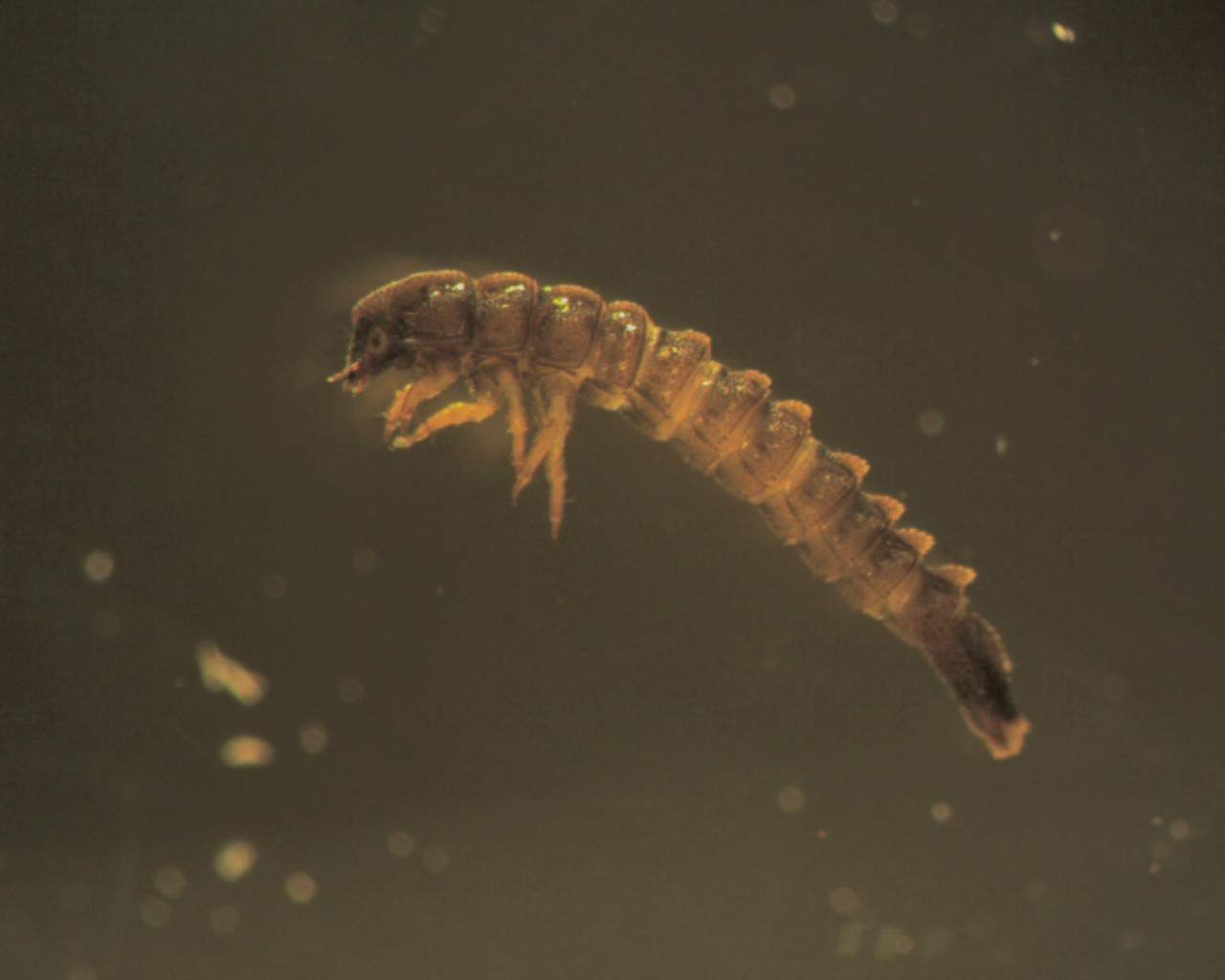

Scientific classification
- Kingdom: Animalia
- Phylum: Arthropoda
- Class: Insecta
- Order: Coleoptera
- Suborder: Polyphaga
- Infraorder: Elateriformia
- Family: Elmidae
- Tribe: Elmini
- Genus: Promoresia; Sanderson, 1954

= Promoresia =

Genus of beetles

Promoresia is a genus of riffle beetles in the family Elmidae. There are at least two described species in Promoresia.

== Species ==
These two species belong to the genus Promoresia:

- Promoresia elegans (Leconte, 1852)^{i c g b}
- Promoresia tardella (Fall, 1925)^{i c g b}

Data sources: i = ITIS, c = Catalogue of Life, g = GBIF, b = Bugguide.net
