= Cylloepus parkeri =

Scientific classification
- Kingdom: Animalia
- Phylum: Arthropoda
- Class: Insecta
- Order: Coleoptera
- Suborder: Polyphaga
- Infraorder: Elateriformia
- Family: Elmidae
- Genus: Cylloepus
- Species: C. parkeri

Binomial name
- Cylloepus parkeri Sanderson, 1953

Species of beetle

Cylloepus parkeri, or Parker's cylloepus riffle beetle, is a species of riffle beetle in the family Elmidae. It is found in North America.
