= Zaitzeviaria bicolor =

Scientific classification
- Kingdom: Animalia
- Phylum: Arthropoda
- Class: Insecta
- Order: Coleoptera
- Suborder: Polyphaga
- Infraorder: Elateriformia
- Family: Elmidae
- Genus: Zaitzeviaria
- Species: Z. bicolor

Binomial name
- Zaitzeviaria bicolor (Pic, 1923)

Synonyms
- Grouvelleus bicolor Pic, 1923; Zaitzeviaria fusca Delève, 1968; Zaitzeviaria bicolor Delève, 1970

Species of beetle

Zaitzeviaria bicolor is a species of riffle beetle found in Sri Lanka, Philippines and Vietnam.

Adults beetles are found in the underface of stones in the current.
