= Cleptelmis addenda =

Scientific classification
- Kingdom: Animalia
- Phylum: Arthropoda
- Clade: Pancrustacea
- Class: Insecta
- Order: Coleoptera
- Suborder: Polyphaga
- Infraorder: Elateriformia
- Family: Elmidae
- Genus: Cleptelmis
- Species: C. addenda

Binomial name
- Cleptelmis addenda (Fall, 1907)

Synonyms
- Elmis addenda Fall, 1907; Helmis ornata Schaeffer, 1911

Species of beetle

Cleptelmis addenda is a species of riffle beetle in the family Elmidae. It is found in North America.
