= Promoresia elegans =

Scientific classification
- Domain: Eukaryota
- Kingdom: Animalia
- Phylum: Arthropoda
- Class: Insecta
- Order: Coleoptera
- Suborder: Polyphaga
- Infraorder: Elateriformia
- Family: Elmidae
- Genus: Promoresia
- Species: P. elegans

Binomial name
- Promoresia elegans (Leconte, 1852)

Synonyms
- Limnius elegans LeConte, 1852

Species of beetle

Promoresia elegans is a species of beetle in the family Elmidae.
