= Graphelmis ceylonica =

Scientific classification
- Kingdom: Animalia
- Phylum: Arthropoda
- Class: Insecta
- Order: Coleoptera
- Suborder: Polyphaga
- Infraorder: Elateriformia
- Family: Elmidae
- Genus: Graphelmis
- Species: G. ceylonica

Binomial name
- Graphelmis ceylonica (Motschulsky, 1860)

Synonyms
- Stenelmis ceylonicus Motschulsky, 1859; Graphelmis ceylonica Deleve, 1973

Species of beetle

Graphelmis ceylonica is a species of riffle beetle found in Sri Lanka.

== Description ==
This elongate, yellowish beetle has a typical length of about 2.29 to 2.60 mm in the male and about 2.41 to 2.65 mm in the female.
