= Ctenelmis elegans =

Scientific classification
- Kingdom: Animalia
- Phylum: Arthropoda
- Class: Insecta
- Order: Coleoptera
- Suborder: Polyphaga
- Infraorder: Elateriformia
- Family: Elmidae
- Genus: Ctenelmis
- Species: C. elegans

Binomial name
- Ctenelmis elegans Delève, 1966

Species of beetle

Ctenelmis elegans is a species of riffle beetles (insects in the family Elmidae). It is found near rivers in South Africa.
