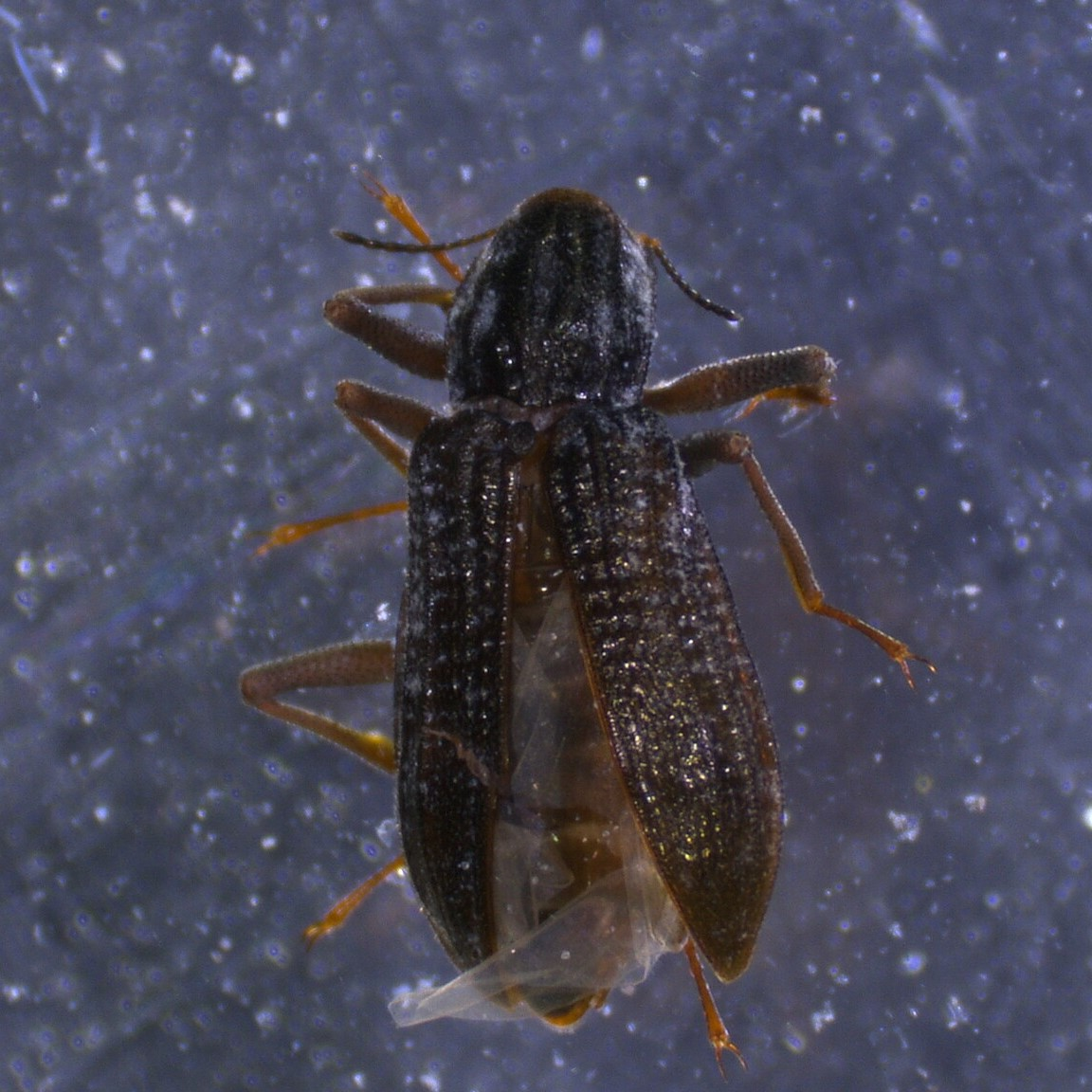

Scientific classification
- Kingdom: Animalia
- Phylum: Arthropoda
- Clade: Pancrustacea
- Class: Insecta
- Order: Coleoptera
- Suborder: Polyphaga
- Infraorder: Elateriformia
- Family: Elmidae
- Genus: Cylloepus
- Species: C. abnormis

Binomial name
- Cylloepus abnormis (Horn, 1870)

Synonyms
- Elmis abnormis Horn, 1870

= Cylloepus abnormis =

Species of beetle

Cylloepus abnormis is a species of riffle beetle in the family Elmidae. It is found in Central America and North America.
