= Promoresia tardella =

Scientific classification
- Domain: Eukaryota
- Kingdom: Animalia
- Phylum: Arthropoda
- Class: Insecta
- Order: Coleoptera
- Suborder: Polyphaga
- Infraorder: Elateriformia
- Family: Elmidae
- Genus: Promoresia
- Species: P. tardella

Binomial name
- Promoresia tardella (Fall, 1925)

Synonyms
- Helmis tardellus (Brown, 1930); Limnius subarcticus Brown, 1930; Promoresia subarctica Fall, 1925

Species of beetle

Promoresia tardella is a species of beetle in the family Elmidae.
