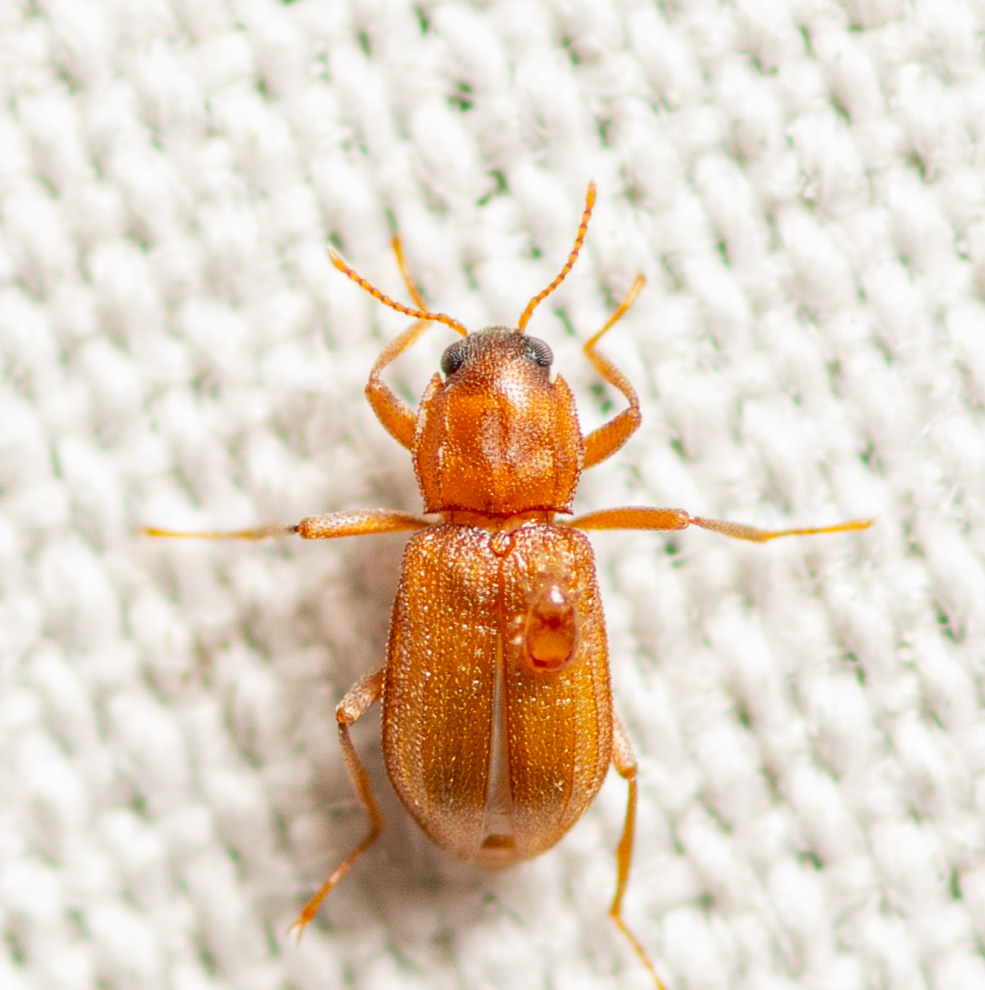

Scientific classification
- Domain: Eukaryota
- Kingdom: Animalia
- Phylum: Arthropoda
- Class: Insecta
- Order: Coleoptera
- Suborder: Polyphaga
- Infraorder: Elateriformia
- Family: Elmidae
- Genus: Hexacylloepus
- Species: H. ferrugineus

Binomial name
- Hexacylloepus ferrugineus (Horn, 1870)

Synonyms
- Elmis ferruginea Horn, 1870

= Hexacylloepus ferrugineus =

Species of beetle

Hexacylloepus ferrugineus, the rusty elmid, is a species of riffle beetle in the family Elmidae. It is found in Central America and North America.
