= Bryelmis rivularis =

Scientific classification
- Domain: Eukaryota
- Kingdom: Animalia
- Phylum: Arthropoda
- Class: Insecta
- Order: Coleoptera
- Suborder: Polyphaga
- Infraorder: Elateriformia
- Family: Elmidae
- Genus: Bryelmis
- Species: B. rivularis

Binomial name
- Bryelmis rivularis Barr, 2011

Species of beetle

Bryelmis rivularis is a species of riffle beetle in the family Elmidae. It is found in North America.
