= Podelmis humeralis =

Scientific classification
- Kingdom: Animalia
- Phylum: Arthropoda
- Class: Insecta
- Order: Coleoptera
- Suborder: Polyphaga
- Infraorder: Elateriformia
- Family: Elmidae
- Genus: Podelmis
- Species: P. humeralis

Binomial name
- Podelmis humeralis Jäch, 1982

Species of beetle

Podelmis humeralis, is a species of riffle beetle found in Sri Lanka.
