= Podelmis quadriplagiata =

Scientific classification
- Kingdom: Animalia
- Phylum: Arthropoda
- Class: Insecta
- Order: Coleoptera
- Suborder: Polyphaga
- Infraorder: Elateriformia
- Family: Elmidae
- Genus: Podelmis
- Species: P. quadriplagiata

Binomial name
- Podelmis quadriplagiata (Motschulsky, 1860)

Synonyms
- Ancyronyx quadriplagiatus Motschulsky, 1860; Leptelmis nietneri Champion, 1923

Species of beetle

Podelmis quadriplagiata is a species of riffle beetle found in Sri Lanka.
