= Narpus angustus =

Scientific classification
- Kingdom: Animalia
- Phylum: Arthropoda
- Class: Insecta
- Order: Coleoptera
- Suborder: Polyphaga
- Infraorder: Elateriformia
- Family: Elmidae
- Genus: Narpus
- Species: N. angustus

Binomial name
- Narpus angustus Casey, 1893

Species of beetle

Narpus angustus is a species of riffle beetle in the family Elmidae. It is found in North America.
