= Podelmis aenea =

Scientific classification
- Kingdom: Animalia
- Phylum: Arthropoda
- Class: Insecta
- Order: Coleoptera
- Suborder: Polyphaga
- Infraorder: Elateriformia
- Family: Elmidae
- Genus: Podelmis
- Species: P. aenea

Binomial name
- Podelmis aenea Delève, 1973

Synonyms
- Stenelmis fletcheri Champion, 1923

Species of beetle

Podelmis aenea is a species of riffle beetle found in Sri Lanka.

Adult beetles are found on stones closer to the freshwater sources.
