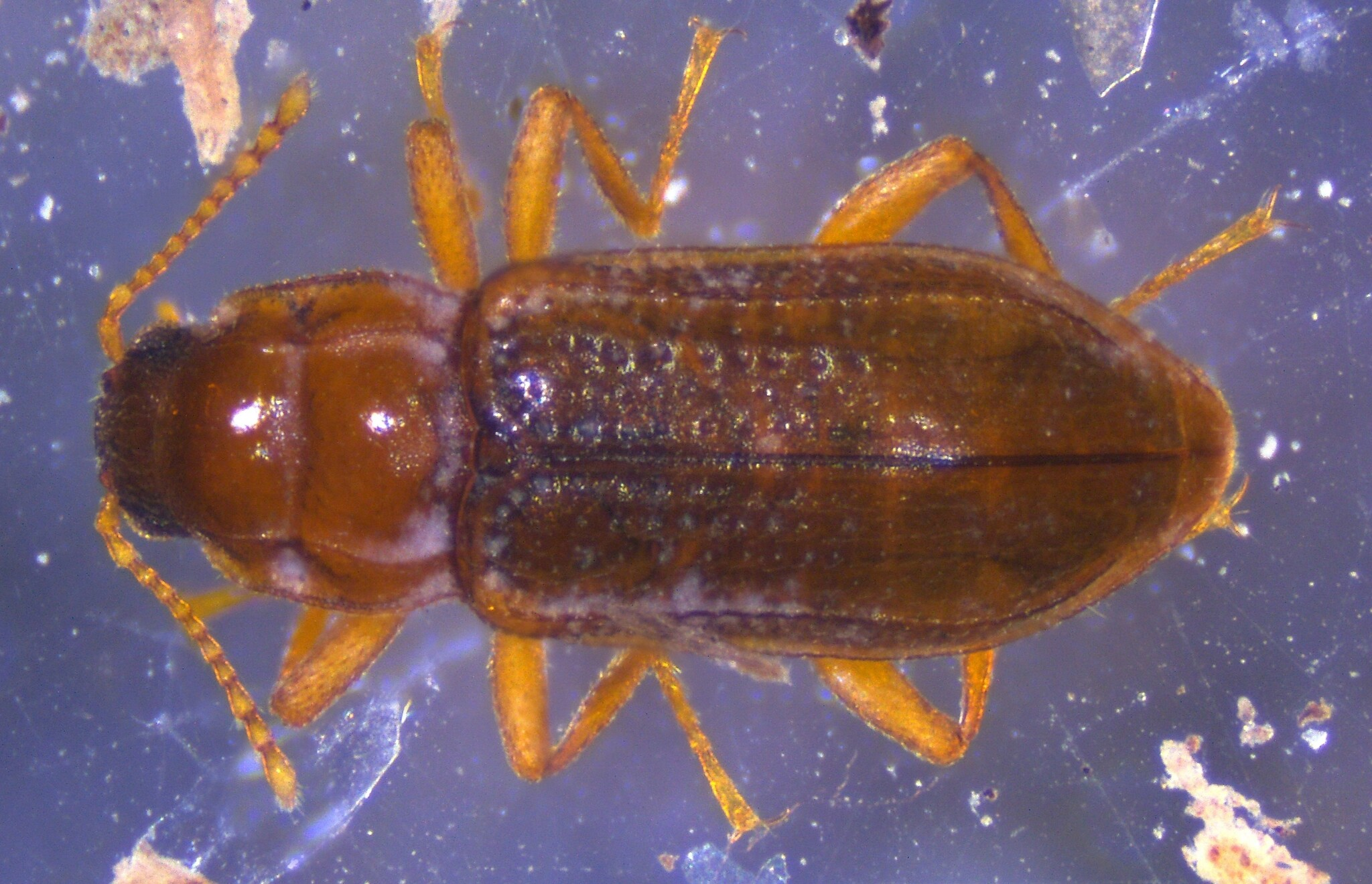

Scientific classification
- Kingdom: Animalia
- Phylum: Arthropoda
- Clade: Pancrustacea
- Class: Insecta
- Order: Coleoptera
- Suborder: Polyphaga
- Infraorder: Elateriformia
- Family: Elmidae
- Genus: Neoelmis
- Species: N. caesa

Binomial name
- Neoelmis caesa (Leconte, 1874)

Synonyms
- Elmis caesa LeConte, 1874

= Neoelmis caesa =

Species of beetle

Neoelmis caesa is a species of riffle beetle in the family Elmidae. It is found in North America.
