= Ilamelmis starmuhlneri =

Scientific classification
- Kingdom: Animalia
- Phylum: Arthropoda
- Class: Insecta
- Order: Coleoptera
- Suborder: Polyphaga
- Infraorder: Elateriformia
- Family: Elmidae
- Genus: Ilamelmis
- Species: I. starmuhlneri

Binomial name
- Ilamelmis starmuhlneri (Delève, 1973)

Synonyms
- Aruelmis starmuhlneri Delève, 1973

Species of beetle

Ilamelmis starmuhlneri, is a species of riffle beetle found in Sri Lanka.

== Description ==
Length of the female is 1.9 mm.
