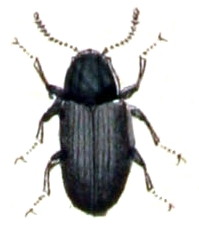

Scientific classification
- Domain: Eukaryota
- Kingdom: Animalia
- Phylum: Arthropoda
- Class: Insecta
- Order: Coleoptera
- Suborder: Polyphaga
- Infraorder: Elateriformia
- Family: Elmidae
- Genus: Limnius
- Species: L. volckmari

Binomial name
- Limnius volckmari (Panzer, 1793)

= Limnius volckmari =

Species of beetle

Limnius volckmari is a species of beetle belonging to the family Elmidae.

It is native to Europe.
