= Ancyronyx jaechi =

Scientific classification
- Kingdom: Animalia
- Phylum: Arthropoda
- Clade: Pancrustacea
- Class: Insecta
- Order: Coleoptera
- Suborder: Polyphaga
- Infraorder: Elateriformia
- Family: Elmidae
- Genus: Ancyronyx
- Species: A. jaechi

Binomial name
- Ancyronyx jaechi Freitag, 2012

Species of beetle

Ancyronyx jaechi is a species of riffle beetle found in Sri Lanka.

== Description ==
The species is typically 2.1 to 2.6 mm long. It has an elongated body with yellow-brown patterning.
