= Ilamelmis foveicollis =

Scientific classification
- Kingdom: Animalia
- Phylum: Arthropoda
- Class: Insecta
- Order: Coleoptera
- Suborder: Polyphaga
- Infraorder: Elateriformia
- Family: Elmidae
- Genus: Ilamelmis
- Species: I. foveicollis

Binomial name
- Ilamelmis foveicollis (Grouvelle, 1896)

Synonyms
- Helmis foveicollis Grouvelle, 1896

Species of beetle

Ilamelmis foveicollis, is a species of riffle beetle found in Sri Lanka.

== Description ==
It is inhabited on stone in the cascade zone, stones on the shore, and on stones in the current.
