= Ilamelmis brunnescens =

Scientific classification
- Kingdom: Animalia
- Phylum: Arthropoda
- Class: Insecta
- Order: Coleoptera
- Suborder: Polyphaga
- Infraorder: Elateriformia
- Family: Elmidae
- Genus: Ilamelmis
- Species: I. brunnescens

Binomial name
- Ilamelmis brunnescens Delève, 1973

Species of beetle

Ilamelmis brunnescens is a species of riffle beetle that is found in Sri Lanka.
