= Potamophilinus costatus =

Scientific classification
- Kingdom: Animalia
- Phylum: Arthropoda
- Class: Insecta
- Order: Coleoptera
- Suborder: Polyphaga
- Infraorder: Elateriformia
- Family: Elmidae
- Genus: Potamophilinus
- Species: P. costatus

Binomial name
- Potamophilinus costatus Hinton, 1935

Species of beetle

Potamophilinus costatus is a species of riffle beetle found in Sri Lanka.

Adult beetles are found under stones and in cascades.
