= Ohiya carinata =

Scientific classification
- Kingdom: Animalia
- Phylum: Arthropoda
- Class: Insecta
- Order: Coleoptera
- Suborder: Polyphaga
- Infraorder: Elateriformia
- Family: Elmidae
- Subfamily: Elminae
- Tribe: Elmini
- Genus: Ohiya; Jäch, 1982
- Species: O. carinata

Binomial name
- Ohiya carinata Jäch, 1982

Species of beetle

Ohiya carinata is a species of riffle beetle found in Sri Lanka. It is the only species in the genus Ohiya.
