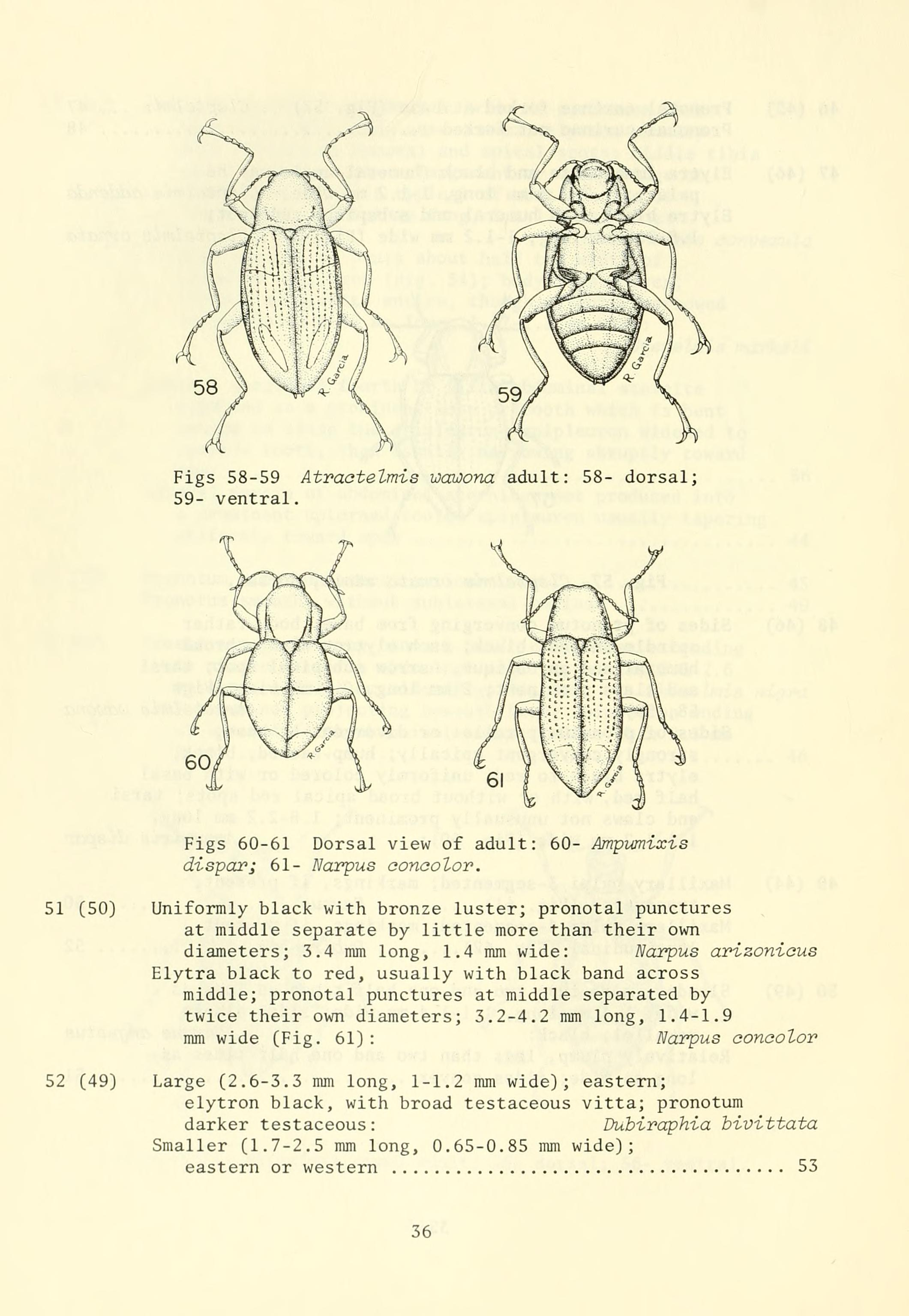

Scientific classification
- Kingdom: Animalia
- Phylum: Arthropoda
- Class: Insecta
- Order: Coleoptera
- Suborder: Polyphaga
- Infraorder: Elateriformia
- Family: Elmidae
- Subfamily: Elminae
- Tribe: Elmini
- Genus: Narpus; Casey, 1893

= Narpus =

Genus of beetles

Narpus is a genus of riffle beetles in the family Elmidae. They are found in western North America. They are associated with clean, fast flowing streams.

== Species ==
These three species belong to the genus Narpus:

- Narpus angustus Casey, 1893
- Narpus arizonicus (Brown, 1930)
- Narpus concolor (LeConte, 1881)
