= Taprobanelmis =

Scientific classification
- Kingdom: Animalia
- Phylum: Arthropoda
- Class: Insecta
- Order: Coleoptera
- Suborder: Polyphaga
- Infraorder: Elateriformia
- Family: Elmidae
- Subfamily: Elminae
- Tribe: Elmini
- Genus: Taprobanelmis; Delève, 1973
- Species: T. carinata

Binomial name
- Taprobanelmis carinata Delève, 1973

Species of beetle

Taprobanelmis carinata, is a species of riffle beetle found in Sri Lanka. It is the only species in the genus Taprobanelmis.

Adults beetles are found on the stones in the cascade.
