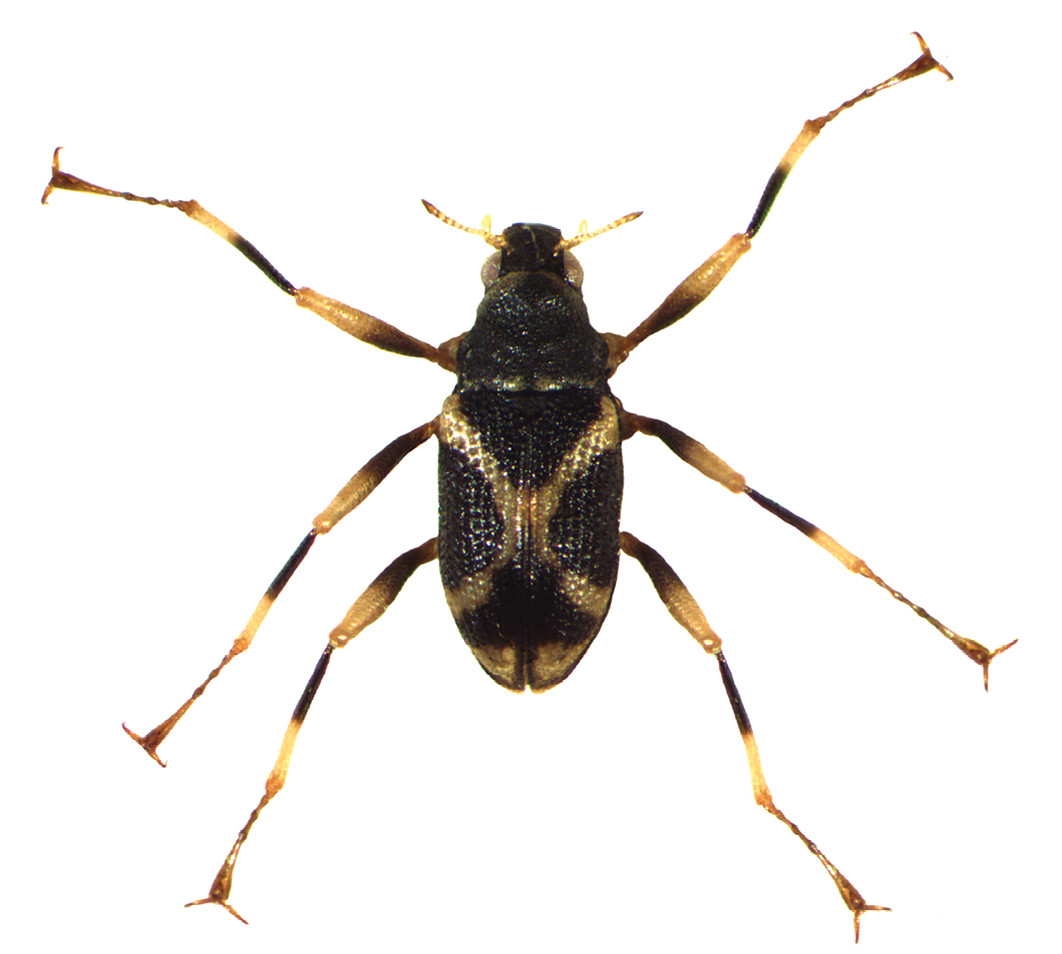
- Ancyronyx schillhammeri adult
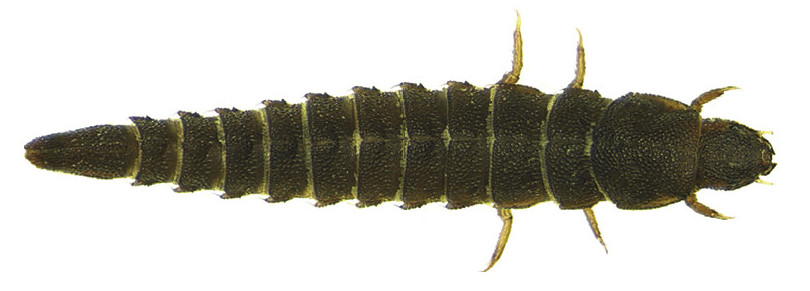
- Ancyronyx patrolus larva

Scientific classification
- Kingdom: Animalia
- Phylum: Arthropoda
- Clade: Pancrustacea
- Class: Insecta
- Order: Coleoptera
- Suborder: Polyphaga
- Infraorder: Elateriformia
- Family: Elmidae
- Subfamily: Elminae
- Tribe: Ancyronychini; Ganglbauer, 1904
- Genus: Ancyronyx; Erichson, 1847

Type species
- Macronychus variegatus Germar, 1824

Species
- See text

= Ancyronyx =

Spider water beetles

Genus of beetles

Ancyronyx, commonly known as spider water beetles or spider riffle beetles, is a genus of aquatic riffle beetles from North America, South Asia, China, and Southeast Asia. They are small beetles with extremely long legs ending in strong claws. Both the adults and the larvae are found underwater in the shallow riffles of streams and rivers, clinging to rocks or submerged wood. They feed on algae and decaying wood tissue. The genus contains twenty-one species, eleven of which are endemic to the Philippines.

== Taxonomy ==
The genus Ancyronyx was established in 1847 by the German entomologist Wilhelm Ferdinand Erichson based on the type species Macronychus variegatus first described in 1824 by the German coleopterologist Ernst Friedrich Germar. It was regarded as a monotypic species until the French entomologist Antoine Henri Grouvelle described the second species, A. acaroides in 1896. It is the sole member of the tribe Ancyronychini, and is classified under the subfamily Elminae of the riffle beetle family, Elmidae.

== Description ==
Members of Ancyronyx superficially resemble spiders and are aquatic, hence their common name, "spider water beetles". They are typically very small, with an average body length (without legs) of 1 to 2 mm (0.039 to 0.079 in). They are characterized by extremely long legs (longer than the body length). The legs have widely separated coxae, with the procoxae (coxae attached to the prothorax) usually visible dorsally. The legs are tipped with large claws, each with two or three basal teeth. The distal teeth are the largest. The pair of antennae are typically 11-segmented. Most of the species possess brightly colored patterns on their elytra, but not all. The elytra also possess eight to eleven grooves (elytral striae), as well as small depressions (elytral punctures) of varying depth and number. The pronotum possesses a transverse groove and a more or less straight front margin, with pronotal carinae absent or weakly present.

Spider water beetles can be divided into two species groups, based on morphological and ecological adaptation patterns.

- The Ancyronyx variegatus species group are larger in size (usually larger than 1.4 mm (0.055 in)), with very long legs, stout coxites on the ovipositor, and a transverse prosternal process. Their larvae are also larger, depressed in cross-section, and possess large side-pointing projections on the sides of the abdomen.
- The Ancyronyx patrolus species group have small and slender bodies, with comparatively shorter legs, long and slender coxites on the ovipositor, and a squarish prosternal process. Their larvae are smaller, with a more vaulted cross-section, and backwards pointing projections from the sides of the abdomen.

Ancyronyx is closely related to the genus Podelmis, but can be distinguished from the latter by the more or less straight and slender last segment of the ovipositor (versus the conical sideways-bent terminal segment of the ovipositor of Podelmis), and the absence of an anterior process on the prosternum.

== Ecology ==
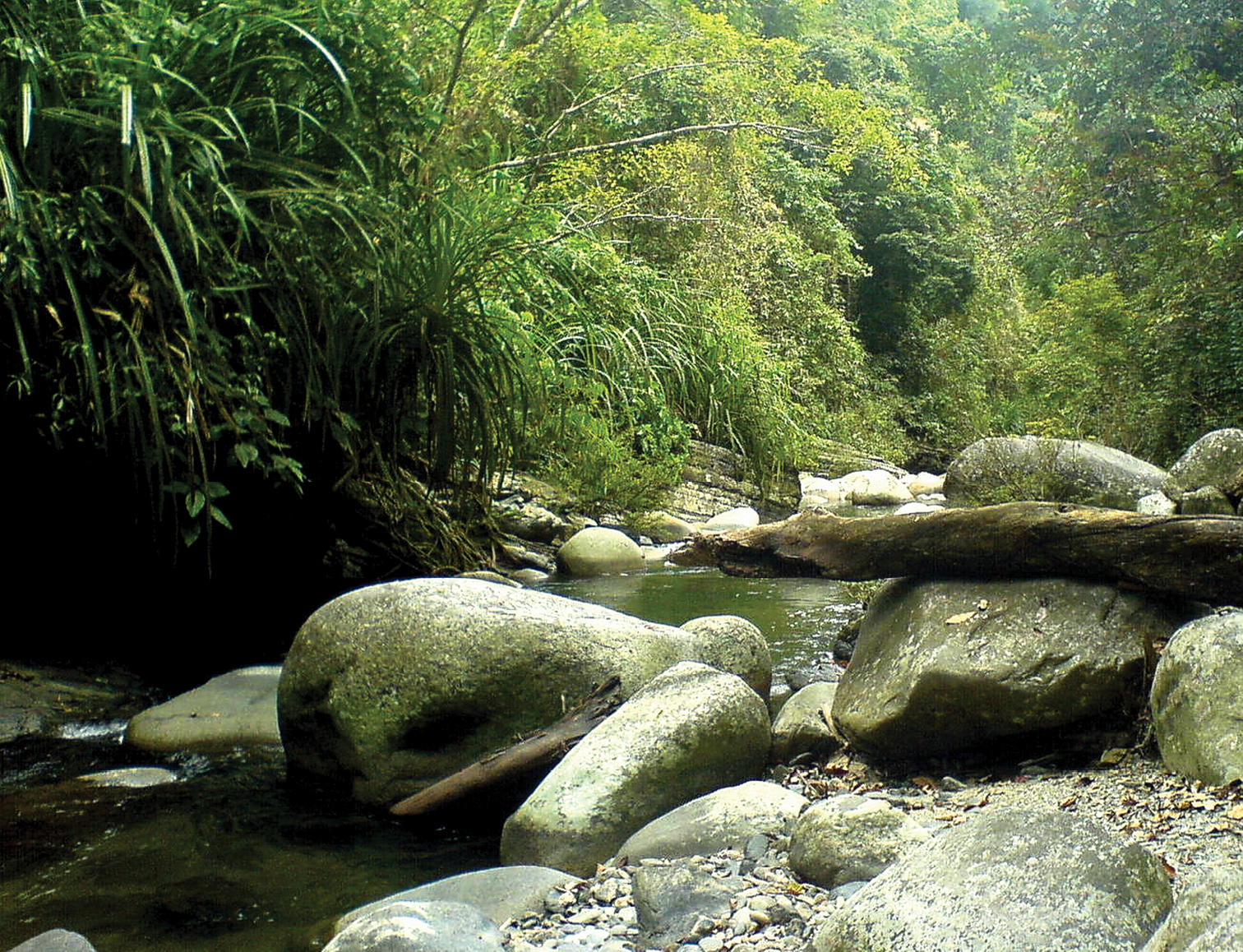
This fast-flowing and unpolluted mountain creek in Palawan, Philippines is the type locality of Ancyronyx montanus

Like almost all riffle beetles, spider water beetles are aquatic, feeding on algae and decaying wood tissue. However, they can not actively swim. They can be found crawling along or clinging with their claws on boulders or submerged wood in lotic riffles of streams and rivers.

The larvae are exclusively aquatic. They breathe by means of tracheal gills. Spider water beetle adults, like all members of the subfamily Elminae, can also remain indefinitely underwater by means of a plastron, a thin film of gas trapped by hydrophobic bristles (setae) on their body. As the insect breathes, the oxygen concentration in the gas film drops in comparison to the surrounding water, causing new oxygen to diffuse again into the plastron.

Because of their reliance on the plastron for breathing, spider water beetles are restricted to the highly oxygenated environments in moderate to fast-moving permanent running water. They are therefore extremely sensitive to water pollution and are potentially valuable bioindicators for measuring the health of river ecosystems.

Members of the Ancyronyx variegatus species group are mostly found in slightly to moderately polluted (mesosaprobic) rivers, almost always found on submerged wood (with the exception of Ancyronyx yunju which were collected from sand and grass roots). Members of the Ancyronyx patrolus species group, meanwhile, are only found in clean permanent streams, usually among rocks.

Ancyronyx malickyi have been caught using light traps, which might indicate phototaxis.

== Distribution ==
The genus was previously only known from two species from highly disjunct localities – Ancyronyx variegatus from North America (described in 1824) and Ancyronyx acaroides from Palembang in Sumatra (described in 1896). This strange distribution pattern (and the fact that there were no new specimens of A. acaroides recovered) initially led 20th century specialists to question whether A. acaroides was indeed collected from Sumatra, or whether it was correctly designated to the genus as originally described. However, in 1991, new specimens of A. acaroides were rediscovered from Sumatra by the Austrian coleopterologists Manfred A. Jäch and S. Schödl, confirming its type locality. In addition they also discovered the species in Southeast Asia, including West Malaysia, Sarawak and Bali during 1992 and 1993. The species was also subsequently found in Thailand, Indonesia and the Philippines. Since then, nineteen new species of the genus have been described from Southeast Asia and China.

== Species ==
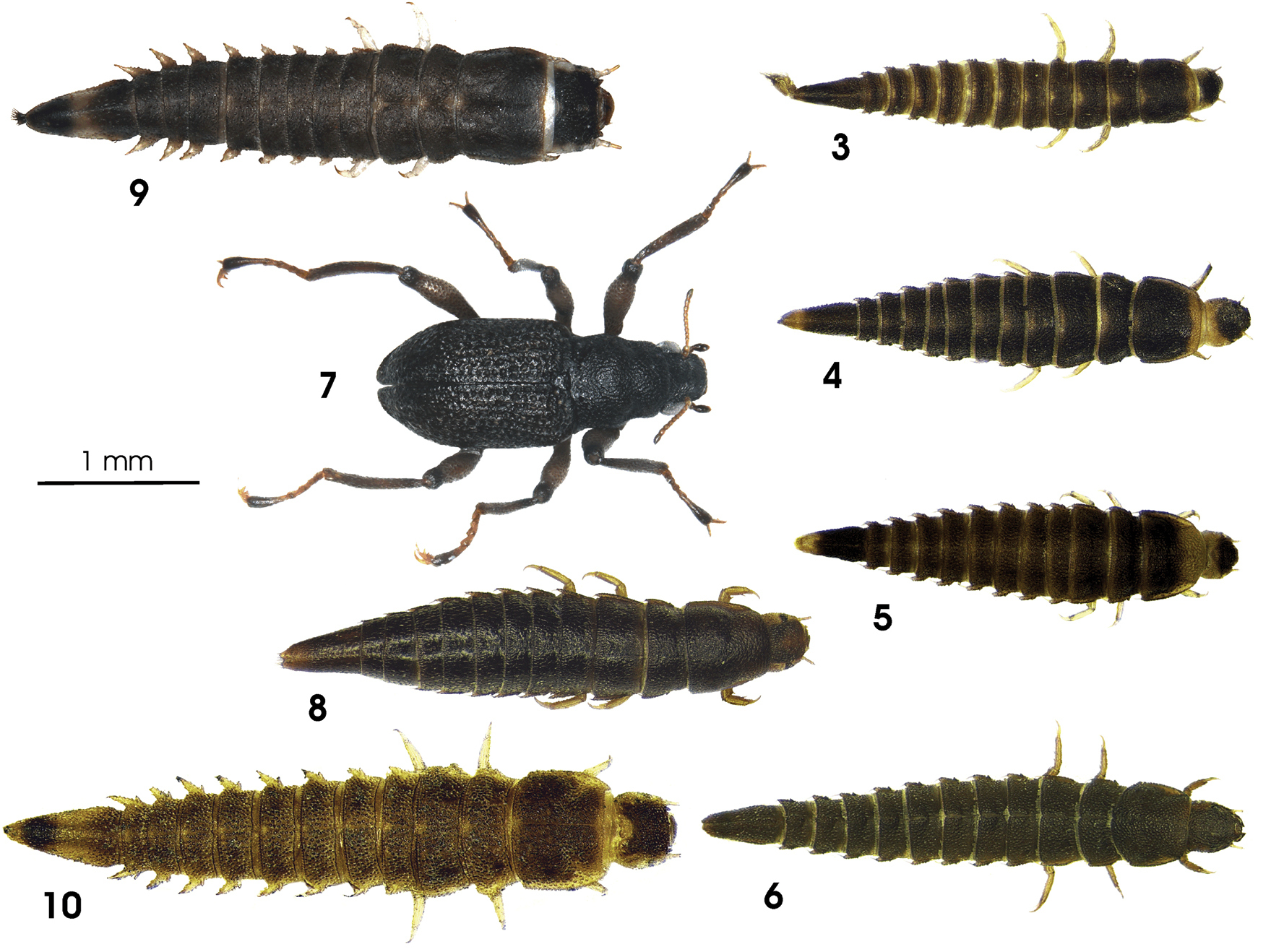
3 Ancyronyx minerva larva, 4 Ancyronyx punkti larva, 5 Ancyronyx pseudopatrolus larva, 6 Ancyronyx patrolus larva, 7 Ancyronyx montanus adult, 8 Ancyronyx montanus larva, 9 Ancyronyx procerus larva, 10 Ancyronyx helgeschneideri larva

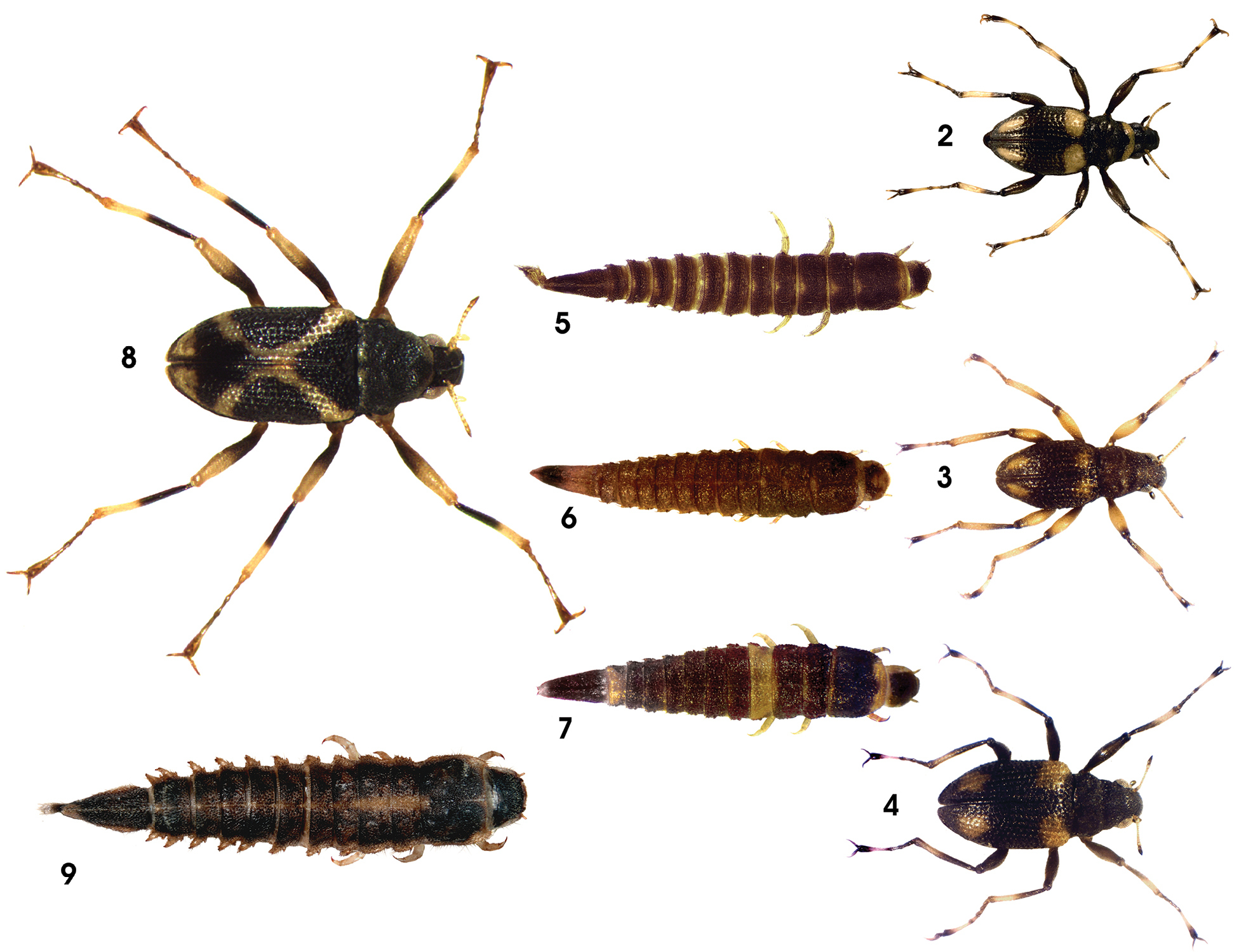
2 Ancyronyx minerva adult, 3 Ancyronyx tamaraw adult, 4 Ancyronyx buhid adult, 5 Ancyronyx minerva larva, 6 Ancyronyx tamaraw larva, 7 Ancyronyx buhid larva, 8 Ancyronyx schillhammeri adult, 9 Ancyronyx schillhammeri larva

There are twenty-one species currently classified under Ancyronyx. Eleven of these are endemic to the Philippines, which may indicate that the country is a center of diversity for the genus. Most of the species have highly restricted distributions, often being found in only one island.

- Ancyronyx acaroides Grouvelle, 1896 – Southeast Asia
  - Ancyronyx acaroides acaroides Grouvelle, 1896 – Myanmar, Vietnam, Malaysia (peninsular Malaysia, Borneo), Brunei, Indonesia (Sumatra, Java)
  - Ancyronyx acaroides cursor Jäch, 1994 – Indonesia (Bali)
- Ancyronyx buhid Freitag, 2013 – Philippines (Mindoro)
- Ancyronyx helgeschneideri Freitag & Jäch, 2007 – Philippines (Palawan, Busuanga)
- Ancyronyx hjarnei Jäch, 2003 – Indonesia (Sulawesi)
- Ancyronyx jaechi Freitag, 2012 – Sri Lanka
- Ancyronyx johanni Jäch, 1994 – Indonesia (Siberut)
- Ancyronyx malickyi Jäch, 1994 – Laos, southern Thailand, Malaysia (peninsular Malaysia, Borneo), Indonesia (Sumatra)
- Ancyronyx minerva Freitag & Jäch, 2007 – Philippines (Palawan, Busuanga, Mindoro)
- Ancyronyx minutulus Freitag & Jäch, 2007 – Philippines (Palawan)
- Ancyronyx montanus Freitag & Balke, 2011 – Philippines (Palawan)
- Ancyronyx patrolus Freitag & Jäch, 2007 – Philippines (Palawan, Busuanga)
- Ancyronyx procerus Jäch, 1994 – Vietnam, Malaysia (Borneo), Brunei, Philippines (Busuanga)
- Ancyronyx pseudopatrolus Freitag & Jäch, 2007 – Philippines (Palawan)
- Ancyronyx punkti Freitag & Jäch, 2007 – Philippines (Palawan)
- Ancyronyx raffaelacatharina Jäch, 2004 – Indonesia (Sulawesi)
- Ancyronyx sarawacensis Jäch, 1994 – Malaysia (Borneo)
- Ancyronyx schillhammeri Jäch, 1994 – Philippines (Mindoro)
- Ancyronyx sophiemarie Jäch, 2004 – Philippines (Sibuyan)
- Ancyronyx tamaraw Freitag, 2013 – Philippines (Mindoro)
- Ancyronyx variegatus (Germar, 1824) – United States of America
- Ancyronyx yunju Bian, Guo, & Ji, 2012 – China (Jiangxi)
