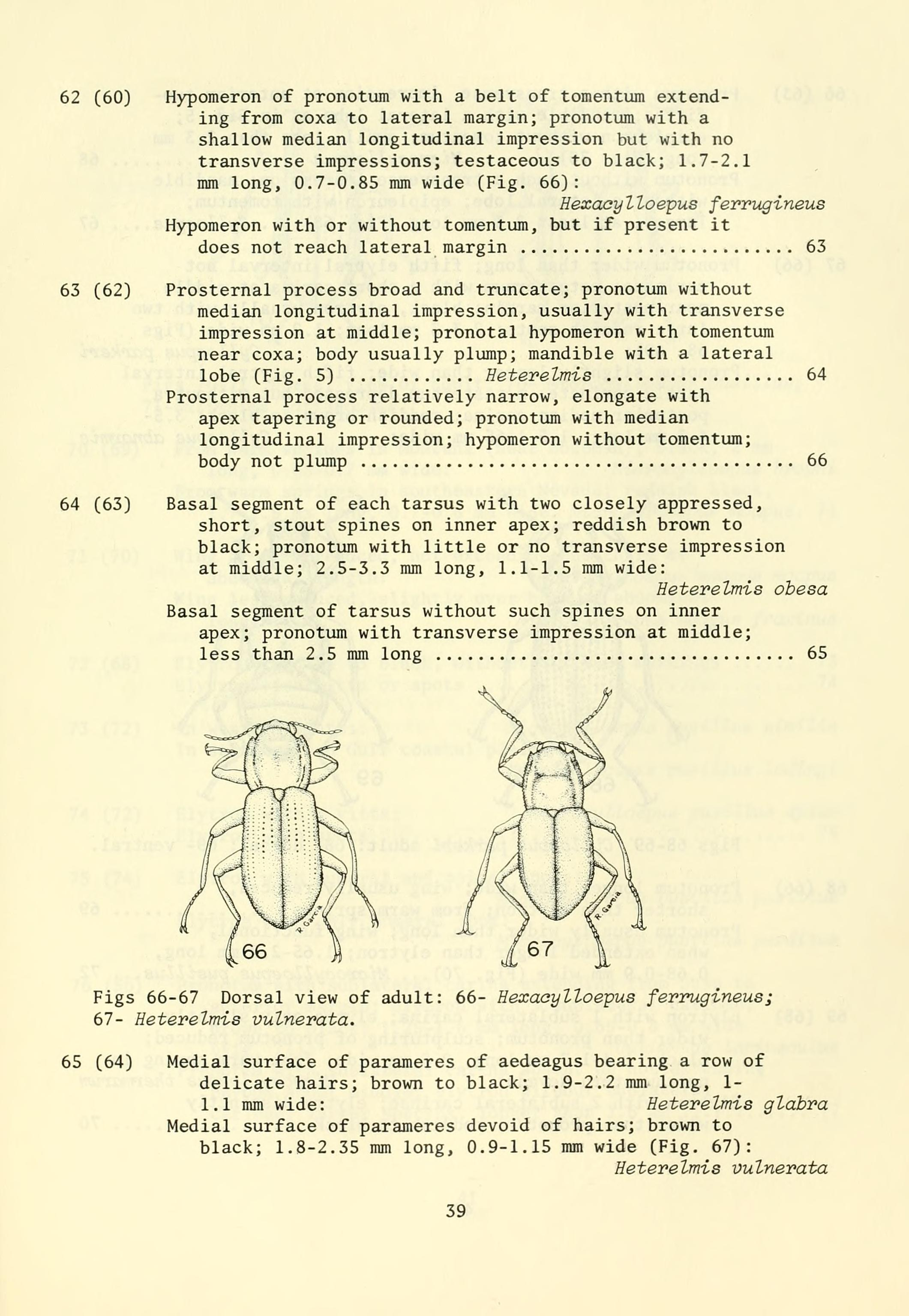
- Hexacylloepus

Scientific classification
- Kingdom: Animalia
- Phylum: Arthropoda
- Clade: Pancrustacea
- Class: Insecta
- Order: Coleoptera
- Suborder: Polyphaga
- Infraorder: Elateriformia
- Family: Elmidae
- Tribe: Elmini
- Genus: Hexacylloepus; Hinton, 1940

= Hexacylloepus =

Genus of beetles

Hexacylloepus is a genus of riffle beetles in the family Elmidae. There are 43 described species in Hexacylloepus.

== Species ==
These 43 species belong to the genus Hexacylloepus:

- Hexacylloepus abditus (Hinton, 1937)
- Hexacylloepus abdominalis (Hington, 1937)
- Hexacylloepus aciculus (Hinton, 1937)
- Hexacylloepus apicalis Hinton, 1940
- Hexacylloepus barrae Polizei, Barclay, and Bispo, 2020
- Hexacylloepus bassindalei Hinton, 1969
- Hexacylloepus calori Polizei, Barclay, and Bispo, 2020
- Hexacylloepus casariae Polizei, Barclay, and Bispo, 2020
- Hexacylloepus danforthi (Musgrave, 1935)
- Hexacylloepus ferrugineus (Horn, 1870)
- Hexacylloepus filiformis (Darlington, 1927)
- Hexacylloepus flavipes (Grouvelle, 1889)
- Hexacylloepus frater Hinton, 1939
- Hexacylloepus froehlichi Polizei, Barclay, and Bispo, 2020
- Hexacylloepus geiseri Polizei, Barclay, and Bispo, 2020
- Hexacylloepus grandis Polizei, Barclay, and Bispo, 2020
- Hexacylloepus granosus (Grouvelle, 1889)
- Hexacylloepus granulosus (Sharp, 1882)
- Hexacylloepus haitianus (Darlington, 1936)
- Hexacylloepus heterelmoides Hinton, 1939
- Hexacylloepus horni (Hinton, 1937)
- Hexacylloepus iassu Polizei, Barclay, and Bispo, 2020
- Hexacylloepus indistinctus (Hinton, 1937)
- Hexacylloepus keitai Polizei, Barclay, and Bispo, 2020
- Hexacylloepus lahottensis (Darlington, 1936)
- Hexacylloepus maierae Polizei, Barclay, and Bispo, 2020
- Hexacylloepus manauara Polizei, Barclay, and Bispo, 2020
- Hexacylloepus metapa Polizei, Barclay, and Bispo, 2020
- Hexacylloepus nirgua Hinton, 1973
- Hexacylloepus nothrus Spangler, 1966
- Hexacylloepus nunezi Hinton, 1973
- Hexacylloepus phalluspilosus Polizei, Barclay, and Bispo, 2020
- Hexacylloepus plaumanni (Hinton, 1937)
- Hexacylloepus scabrosus Hinton, 1940
- Hexacylloepus shorti Polizei, Barclay, and Bispo, 2020
- Hexacylloepus smithi (Grouvelle, 1898)
- Hexacylloepus subsulcatus Grouvelle, 1889
- Hexacylloepus sulcatus (Grouvelle, 1889)
- Hexacylloepus taylorae Polizei, Barclay, and Bispo, 2020
- Hexacylloepus thoracica Polizei, Barclay, and Bispo, 2020
- Hexacylloepus tibialis Polizei, Barclay, and Bispo, 2020
- Hexacylloepus ubirajarai Polizei, Barclay, and Bispo, 2020
- Hexacylloepus zaninii Polizei, Barclay, and Bispo, 2020
