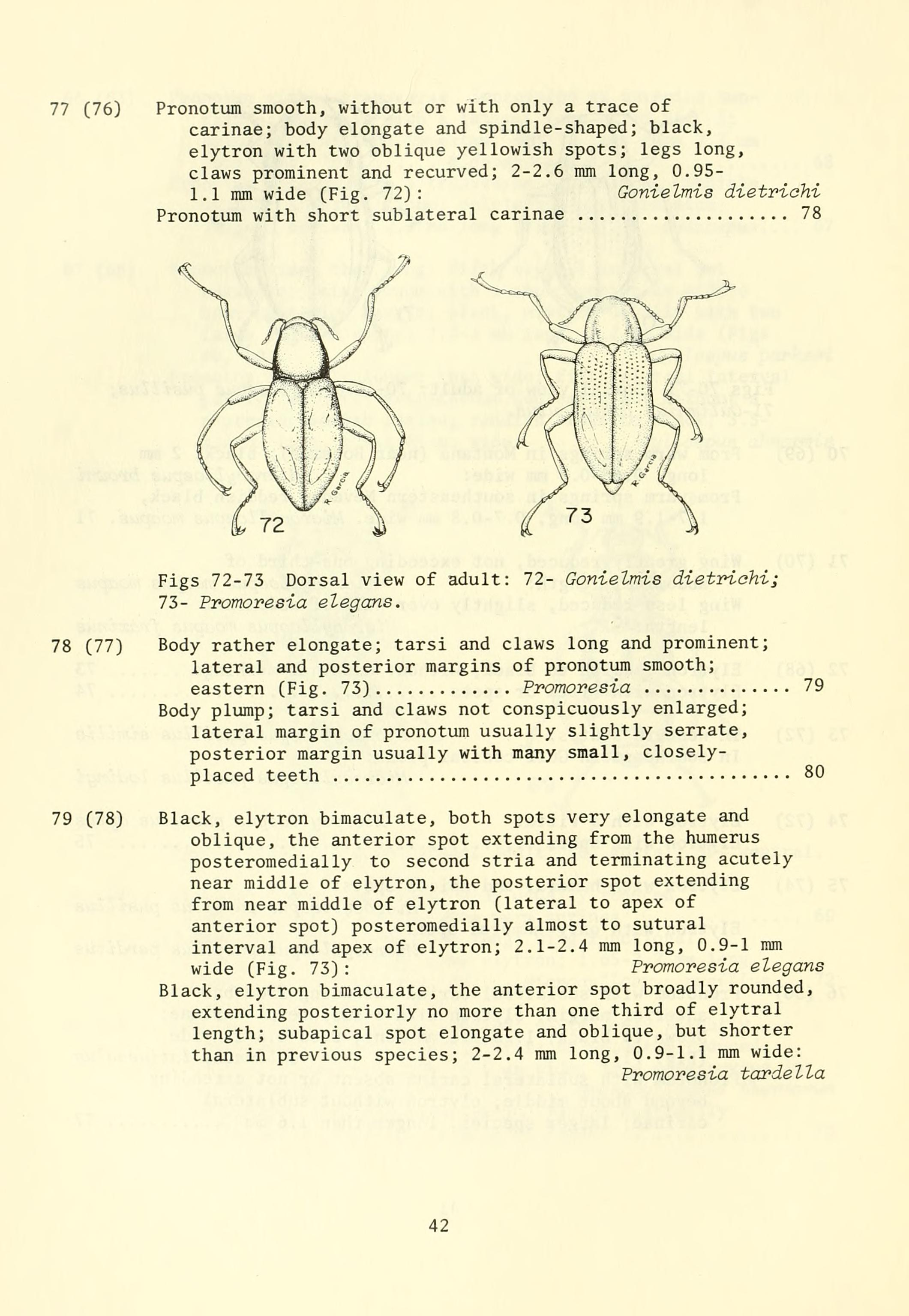
- Dorsal view of adult Gonielmis dietrichi on fig N.0 72

Scientific classification
- Kingdom: Animalia
- Phylum: Arthropoda
- Class: Insecta
- Order: Coleoptera
- Suborder: Polyphaga
- Infraorder: Elateriformia
- Family: Elmidae
- Tribe: Elmini
- Genus: Gonielmis; Sanderson, 1954

= Heterlimnius dietrichi =

Genus of beetles

Heterlimnius dietrichi is a species of riffle beetles in the family Elmidae that occurs in the southeastern United States. It was formerly the only species in the genus Gonielmis.
