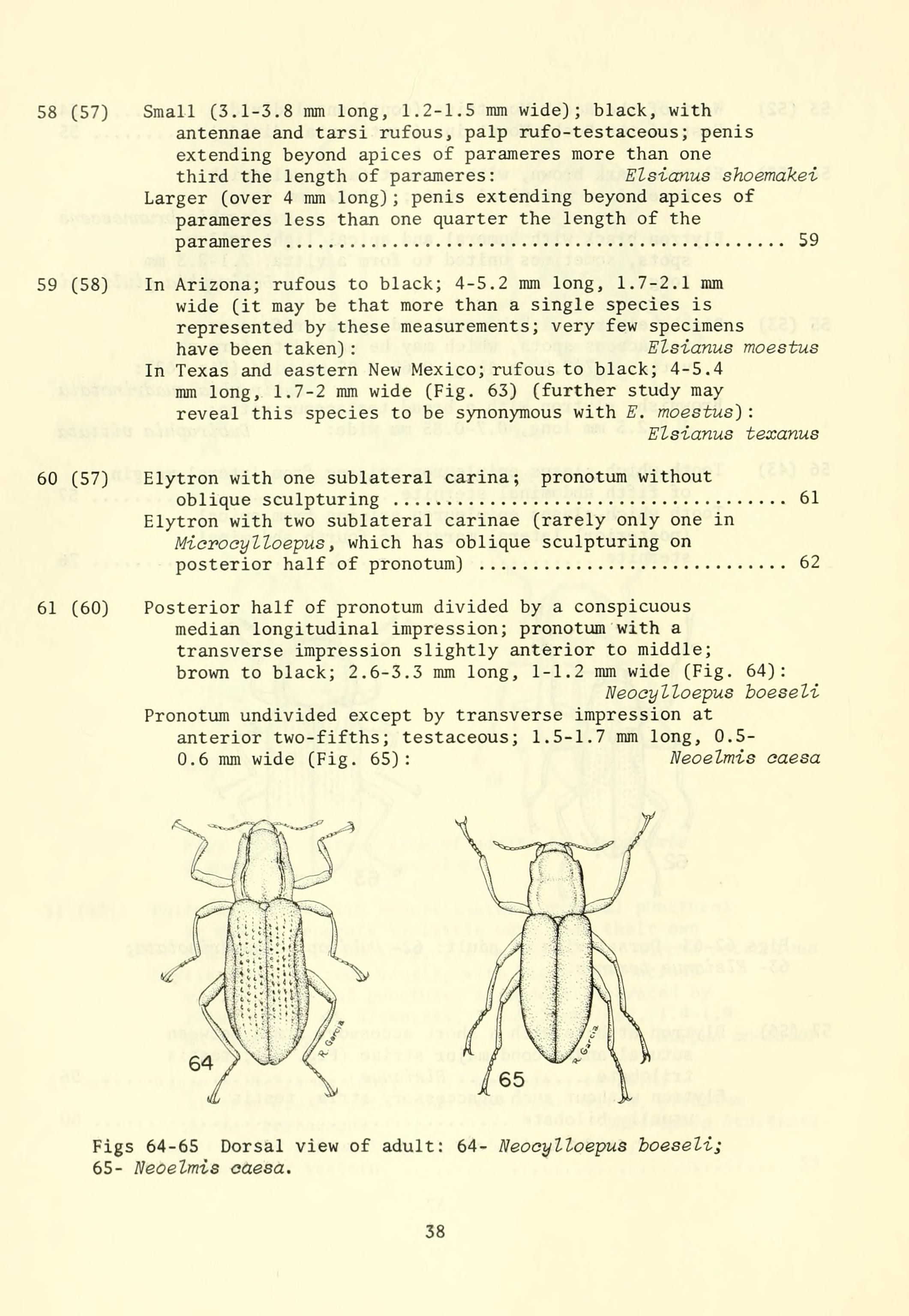
- Dorsal view of adult Neoelmis caesa on fig 65

Scientific classification
- Domain: Eukaryota
- Kingdom: Animalia
- Phylum: Arthropoda
- Class: Insecta
- Order: Coleoptera
- Suborder: Polyphaga
- Infraorder: Elateriformia
- Family: Elmidae
- Tribe: Elmini
- Genus: Neoelmis; Musgrave, 1935

= Neoelmis =

Genus of beetles

Neoelmis is a genus of riffle beetles in the family Elmidae. There are more than 50 described species in Neoelmis.

== Species ==
These 51 species belong to the genus Neoelmis:

- Neoelmis abdominalis Hinton, 1939
- Neoelmis alcine Hinton, 1972
- Neoelmis ampla Hinton, 1940
- Neoelmis anytis Hinton, 1972
- Neoelmis apicalis (Sharp, 1882)
- Neoelmis aragua Hinton, 1972
- Neoelmis argentinensis Manzo & Archangelsky, 2012
- Neoelmis aspera Hinton, 1940
- Neoelmis atys Hinton, 1972
- Neoelmis azteca Hinton, 1940
- Neoelmis caesa (Leconte, 1874)
- Neoelmis ceto Hinton, 1972
- Neoelmis crino Hinton, 1972
- Neoelmis fossa Hinton, 1940
- Neoelmis giga Hinton, 1939
- Neoelmis gracilis Musgrave, 1935
- Neoelmis grossa Hinton, 1939
- Neoelmis grossepunctata Delève, 1968
- Neoelmis guarani Shepard & Barr, 2016-22
- Neoelmis limosa (Grouvelle, 1908)
- Neoelmis lobata Hinton, 1939
- Neoelmis longula Hinton, 1936
- Neoelmis maculata Hinton, 1940
- Neoelmis mamorata Hinton, 1940
- Neoelmis marmorata Hinton, 1940
- Neoelmis maro Hinton, 1972
- Neoelmis mila Hinton, 1972
- Neoelmis minima (Darlington, 1927)
- Neoelmis morador Hinton, 1972
- Neoelmis mormo Hinton, 1972
- Neoelmis musgravei Hinton, 1940
- Neoelmis nana Hinton, 1940
- Neoelmis nelo Hinton, 1972
- Neoelmis nicon Hinton, 1972
- Neoelmis olenus Hinton, 1972
- Neoelmis opis Hinton, 1972
- Neoelmis plaumanni Hinton, 1940
- Neoelmis porrecta Delève, 1968
- Neoelmis prosternalis Hinton, 1939
- Neoelmis pusio Hinton, 1971
- Neoelmis reichardti Hinton, 1972
- Neoelmis resa Hinton, 1972
- Neoelmis saon Hinton, 1972
- Neoelmis scissicollis (Germain, 1892)
- Neoelmis simoni (Grouvelle, 1889)
- Neoelmis sketi Spangler, 1996
- Neoelmis sul Hinton, 1972
- Neoelmis thoracica (Grouvelle, 1896)
- Neoelmis thyas Hinton, 1972
- Neoelmis tibialis Delève, 1968
- Neoelmis tocuyito Hinton, 1972
