= Huleechius =

Scientific classification
- Domain: Eukaryota
- Kingdom: Animalia
- Phylum: Arthropoda
- Class: Insecta
- Order: Coleoptera
- Suborder: Polyphaga
- Infraorder: Elateriformia
- Family: Elmidae
- Tribe: Elmini
- Genus: Huleechius; Brown, 1981

Genus of beetles

Huleechius is a genus of riffle beetles in the family Elmidae. There are at least two described species in Huleechius.

== Species ==
These two species belong to the genus Huleechius:

- Huleechius marroni Brown, 1981
- Huleechius spinipes (Hinton, 1934)
