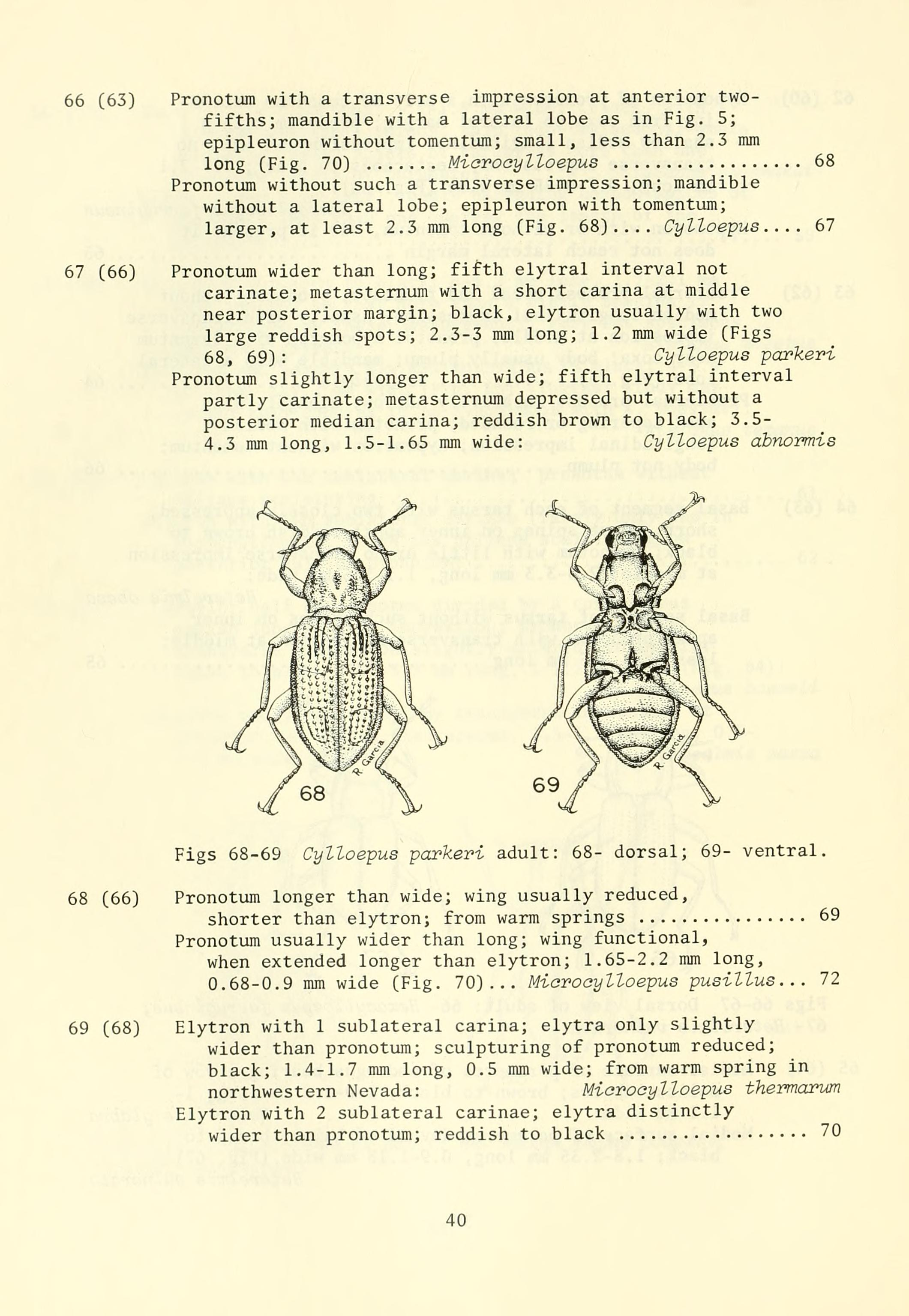
- Cylloepus parkeri

Scientific classification
- Kingdom: Animalia
- Phylum: Arthropoda
- Clade: Pancrustacea
- Class: Insecta
- Order: Coleoptera
- Suborder: Polyphaga
- Infraorder: Elateriformia
- Family: Elmidae
- Tribe: Elmini
- Genus: Cylloepus; Erichson, 1847

= Cylloepus =

Genus of beetles

Cylloepus is a genus of riffle beetles in the family Elmidae. There are 57 described species in Cylloepus.

== Species ==
- Cylloepus abnormis (Horn, 1870)
- Cylloepus alcine Hinton, 1945
- Cylloepus araneolus (Mueller, 1806)
- Cylloepus atys Hinton, 1946
- Cylloepus barberi Hinton, 1934
- Cylloepus bartolozzi Monte and Mascagni, 2012
- Cylloepus bispoi Polizei and Barclay, 2019
- Cylloepus blairi Hinton, 1936
- Cylloepus brasiliensis Grouvelle, 1889
- Cylloepus caicus Hinton, 1946
- Cylloepus carinulus Hinton, 1945
- Cylloepus cesari Monte and Mascagni, 2012
- Cylloepus confusus Hinton, 1936
- Cylloepus consobrinus Grouvelle, 1896
- Cylloepus didas Hinton, 1945
- Cylloepus dimorphus Shepard, Sites, and Rodrigues, 2021
- Cylloepus dorvillei Passos and Felix, 2004
- Cylloepus drymus Hinton, 1946
- Cylloepus fabianorum Monte and Mscagni, 2012
- Cylloepus francescae Monte and Mascagni, 2012
- Cylloepus friburguensis Sampaio, Passos, and Ferreira, 2011
- Cylloepus gigas Grouvelle, 1889
- Cylloepus gnidus Hinton, 1946
- Cylloepus gounellei (Grouvelle, 1889)
- Cylloepus hastatus Delève, 1968
- Cylloepus heteroceros (Sharp, 1882)
- Cylloepus macrelmoides Delève, 1968
- Cylloepus maro Hinton, 1945
- Cylloepus mazzai Monte and Mascagni, 2012
- Cylloepus nelo Hinton, 1945
- Cylloepus nessimiani Sampaio, Passos, and Ferreira, 2011
- Cylloepus nicon Hinton, 1945
- Cylloepus olenus Hinton, 1945
- Cylloepus optatus Sharp, 1882
- Cylloepus palpalis Hinton, 1937
- Cylloepus parallelus Delève, 1968
- Cylloepus parkeri Sanderson, 1953 (Parker's cylloepus riffle beetle)
- Cylloepus proximus Hinton, 1937
- Cylloepus punctatus Hinton, 1940
- Cylloepus puncticollis (Hinton, 1934)
- Cylloepus quadratus (Darlington, 1927)
- Cylloepus quinquecarinatus Sampaio, Passos, and Ferreira, 2011
- Cylloepus reitteri Grouvelle, 1889
- Cylloepus sculpticollis Delèville, 1968
- Cylloepus segurae Polizei and Barclay, 2019
- Cylloepus sharpi Grouvelle, 1889
- Cylloepus silius Hinton, 1946
- Cylloepus sparsus Hinton, 1940
- Cylloepus terzanii Monte and Mascagni, 2012
- Cylloepus tuberculatus Hinton, 1940
- Cylloepus typhon Hinton, 1945
- Cylloepus ulpianus Hinton, 1946
- Cylloepus ventralis Hinton, 1940
- Cylloepus vianai Hinton, 1951
- Cylloepus vicinus Hinton, 1940
- Cylloepus whitmanae Monte and Mascagni, 2012
- Cylloepus zagreus Hinton, 1945
