= Bryelmis =

Scientific classification
- Kingdom: Animalia
- Phylum: Arthropoda
- Clade: Pancrustacea
- Class: Insecta
- Order: Coleoptera
- Suborder: Polyphaga
- Infraorder: Elateriformia
- Family: Elmidae
- Tribe: Elmini
- Genus: Bryelmis; Barr, 2011

Genus of beetles

Bryelmis is a genus of riffle beetles in the family Elmidae. There are at least three described species in Bryelmis.

== Species ==
These three species belong to the genus Bryelmis:

- Bryelmis idahoensis Barr, 2011
- Bryelmis rivularis Barr, 2011
- Bryelmis siskiyou Barr, 2011
