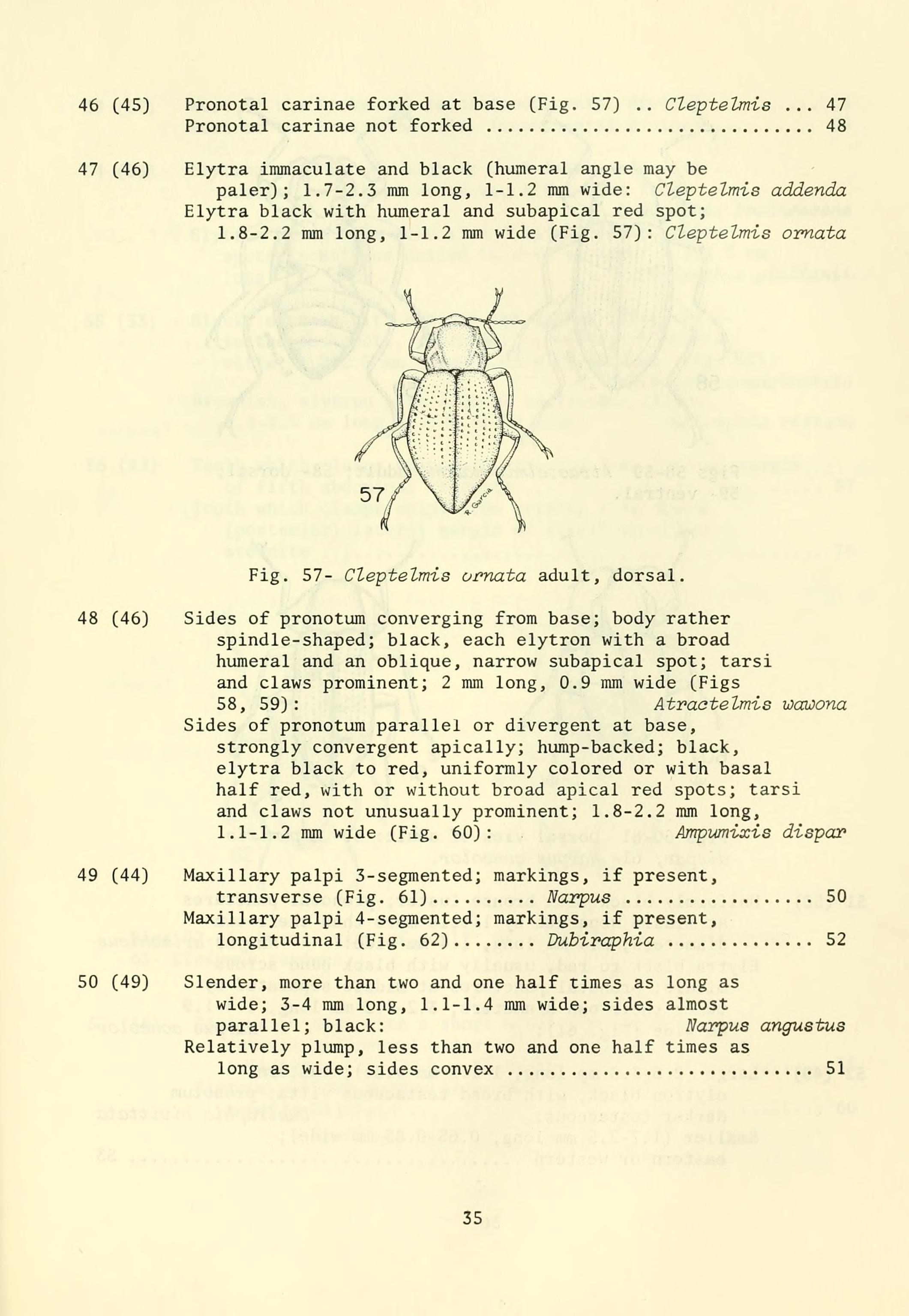
- Coleoptera

Scientific classification
- Kingdom: Animalia
- Phylum: Arthropoda
- Clade: Pancrustacea
- Class: Insecta
- Order: Coleoptera
- Suborder: Polyphaga
- Infraorder: Elateriformia
- Family: Elmidae
- Tribe: Elmini
- Genus: Cleptelmis; Sanderson, 1954

= Cleptelmis =

Genus of beetles

Cleptelmis is a monotypic genus of riffle beetles in the family Elmidae. Cleptelmis addenda (Fall, 1907) is the only species in the genus Cleptelmis.
