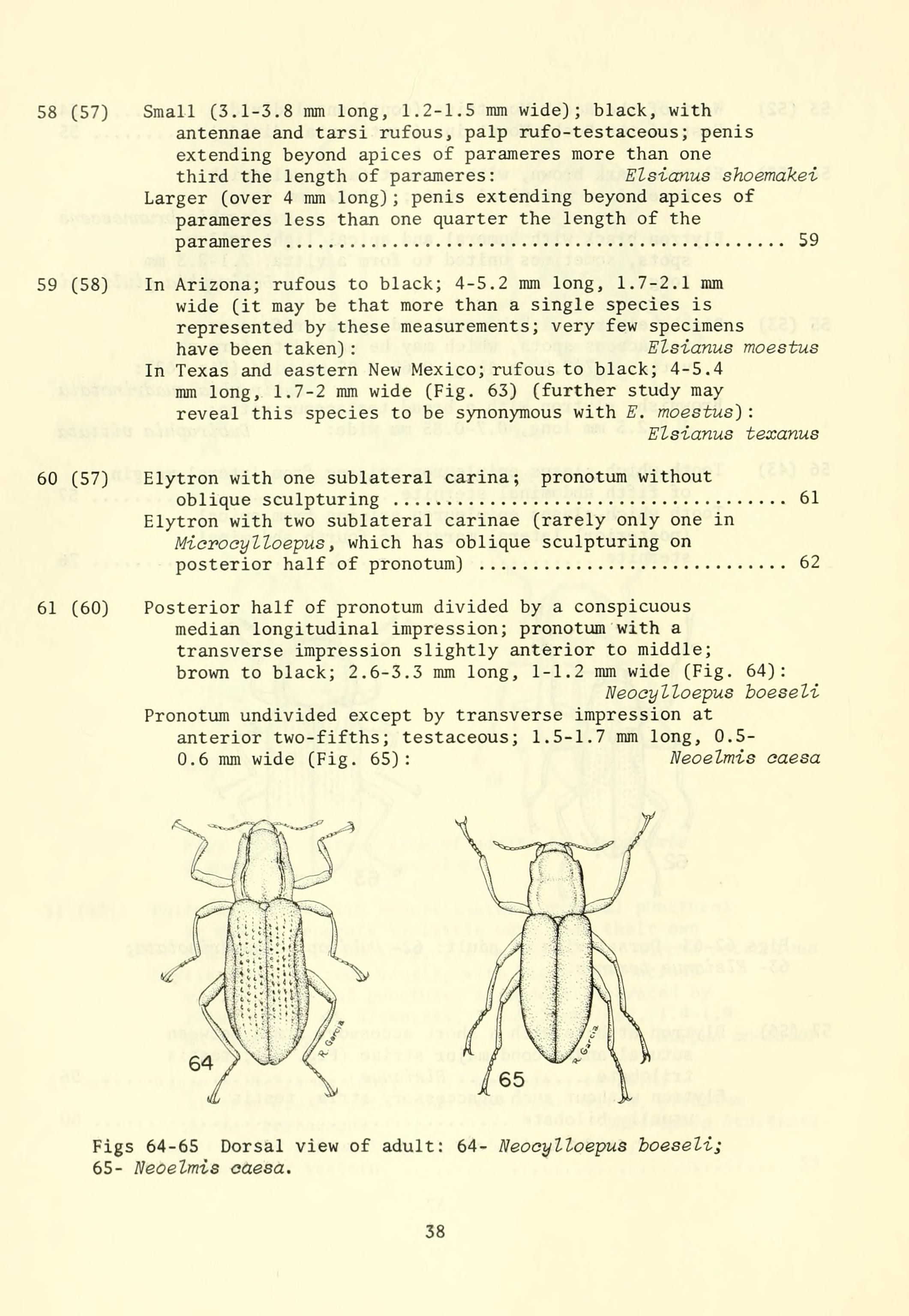
- Dorsal view of adult Neocylloepus boeseli

Scientific classification
- Domain: Eukaryota
- Kingdom: Animalia
- Phylum: Arthropoda
- Class: Insecta
- Order: Coleoptera
- Suborder: Polyphaga
- Infraorder: Elateriformia
- Family: Elmidae
- Tribe: Elmini
- Genus: Neocylloepus; Brown, 1970

= Neocylloepus =

Genus of beetles

Neocylloepus is a genus of riffle beetles in the family Elmidae. There are about eight described species in Neocylloepus.

== Species ==
These eight species belong to the genus Neocylloepus:

- Neocylloepus arringtoni Brown, 1970
- Neocylloepus boeseli Brown, 1970
- Neocylloepus championi (Sharp, 1882)
- Neocylloepus chaparensis Manzo & Moya, 2010
- Neocylloepus hintoni Brown, 1970
- Neocylloepus petersoni Brown, 1970
- Neocylloepus sandersoni Brown, 1970
- Neocylloepus sculptipennis (Sharp, 1882)
