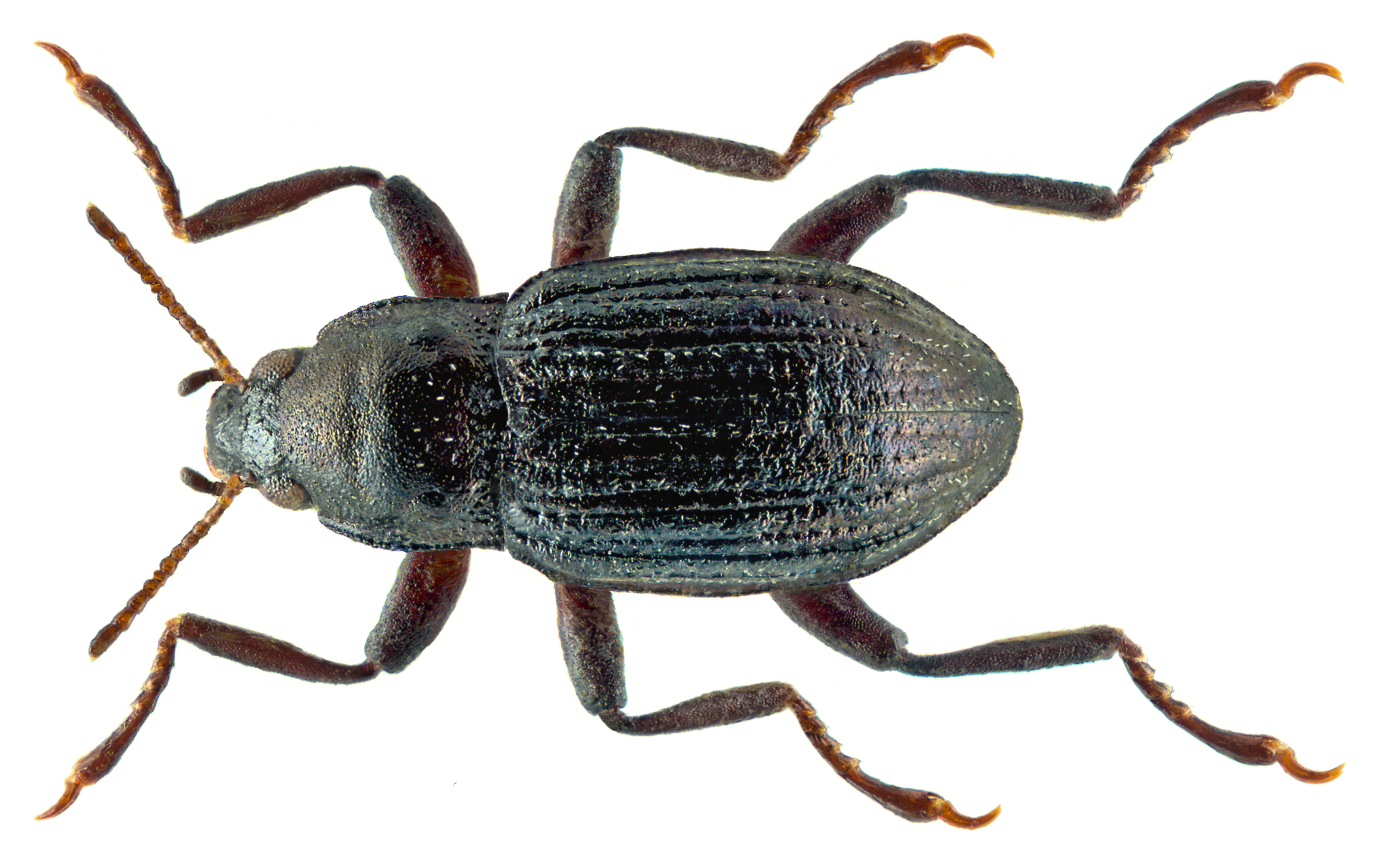
- Riolus

Scientific classification
- Domain: Eukaryota
- Kingdom: Animalia
- Phylum: Arthropoda
- Class: Insecta
- Order: Coleoptera
- Suborder: Polyphaga
- Infraorder: Elateriformia
- Family: Elmidae
- Genus: Riolus; Mulsant & Rey, 1872

= Riolus =

Genus of beetles

Riolus is a genus of beetles belonging to the family Elmidae.

The species of this genus are found in Europe.

Species:

- Riolus cupreus (Müller, 1806)
- Riolus fontinalis Jäch, 1984
