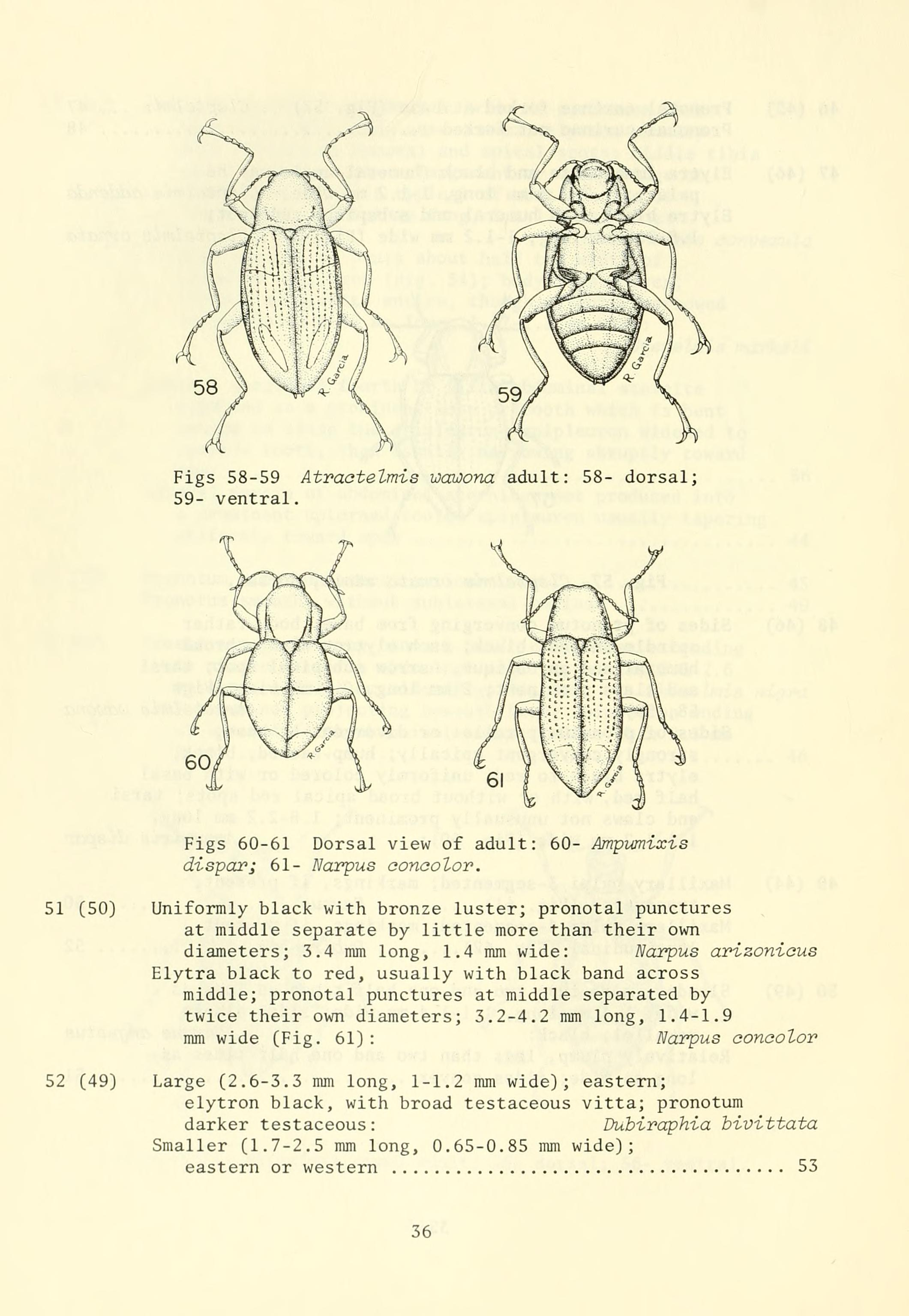
- Atractelmis on image N.O 58 and N.0 59

Conservation status
- Vulnerable (NatureServe)

Scientific classification
- Kingdom: Animalia
- Phylum: Arthropoda
- Class: Insecta
- Order: Coleoptera
- Suborder: Polyphaga
- Infraorder: Elateriformia
- Family: Elmidae
- Genus: Atractelmis; Chandler, 1954
- Species: A. wawona

Binomial name
- Atractelmis wawona Chandler, 1954

= Atractelmis =

Genus of beetles

Atractelmis is a genus of riffle beetles in the family Elmidae. The genus is monotypic, the sole species being Atractelmis wawona, also known as the Wawona riffle beetle. It is endemic to the Western United States between California, Oregon, and Idaho. The specific name wawona refers to its type locality, Wawona in the Yosemite National Park.

== Habitat ==
Atractelmis wawona occur in riffles of rapid clear mountain streams at 600–1,500 m (2,000–5,000 ft) above sea level. Adults and larvae occur in the same microhabitats and are typically found in aquatic mosses, particularly Platyhypnidium riparioides. These beetles are easily overlooked but can be locally numerous.

== Description ==
Adults measure about 2 mm (0.079 in) in length and 0.9 mm (0.035 in) in width. They are shiny black above with four red spots on the elytra. The larvae can grow to 4.8–5 mm (0.19–0.20 in) in length.
