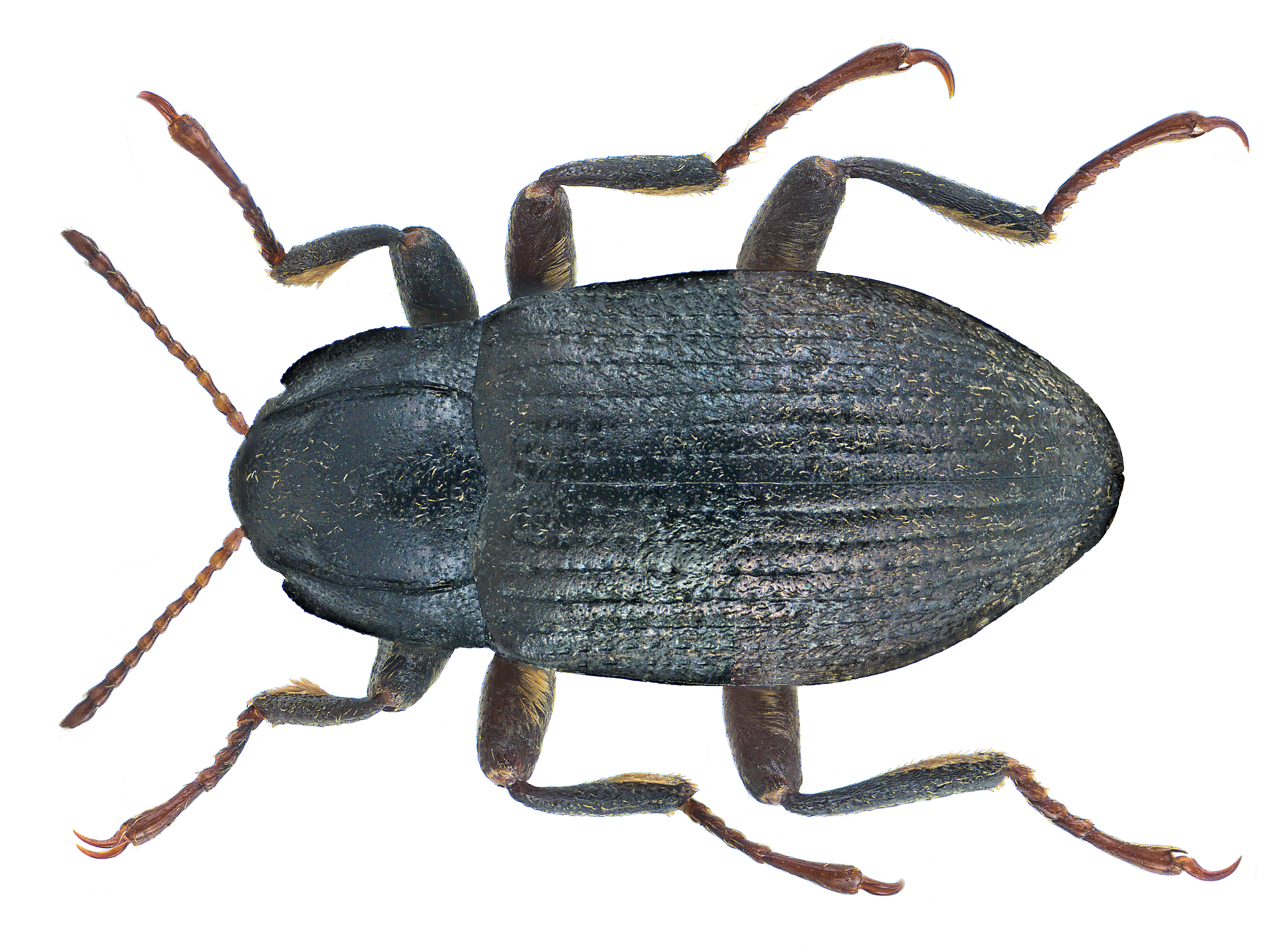
- Limnius volckmari

Scientific classification
- Domain: Eukaryota
- Kingdom: Animalia
- Phylum: Arthropoda
- Class: Insecta
- Order: Coleoptera
- Suborder: Polyphaga
- Infraorder: Elateriformia
- Family: Elmidae
- Genus: Limnius; Illiger, 1802

Synonyms
- Latelmis Reitter, 1883; Lathelmis Zaitzev, 1908

= Limnius =

Genus of beetles

Limnius is a genus of beetles belonging to the family Elmidae.

== Species ==
The following species are recognised n the genus Limnius:

- Limnius aegyptiacus Kuwert, 1890
- Limnius bolivari Bollow
- Limnius colchicus Delève, 1963
- Limnius fastiditus Leconte, 1850
- Limnius gibbosus Jäch, 1984
- Limnius intermedius Fairmaire, 1881
- Limnius latinsculus Leconte, 1866
- Limnius latiusculus (Zaitzev, 1947)
- Limnius letourneuxi (Pic, 1894)
- Limnius muelleri (Erichson, 1847)
- Limnius occidentalis Bollow
- Limnius opacus Müller, 1806
- Limnius orientis Bollow
- Limnius perrisi (Dufour, 1843)
- Limnius satanus Jäch, 1982
- Limnius stygius Hernando, Aguilera & Ribera, 2001
- Limnius sulcipennis Fairmaire, 1881
- Limnius surcoufi (Pic, 1905)
- Limnius swayambhu Jäch, 1982
- Limnius volckmari (Panzer, 1793)
- Limnius wewalkai Jäch, 1984
