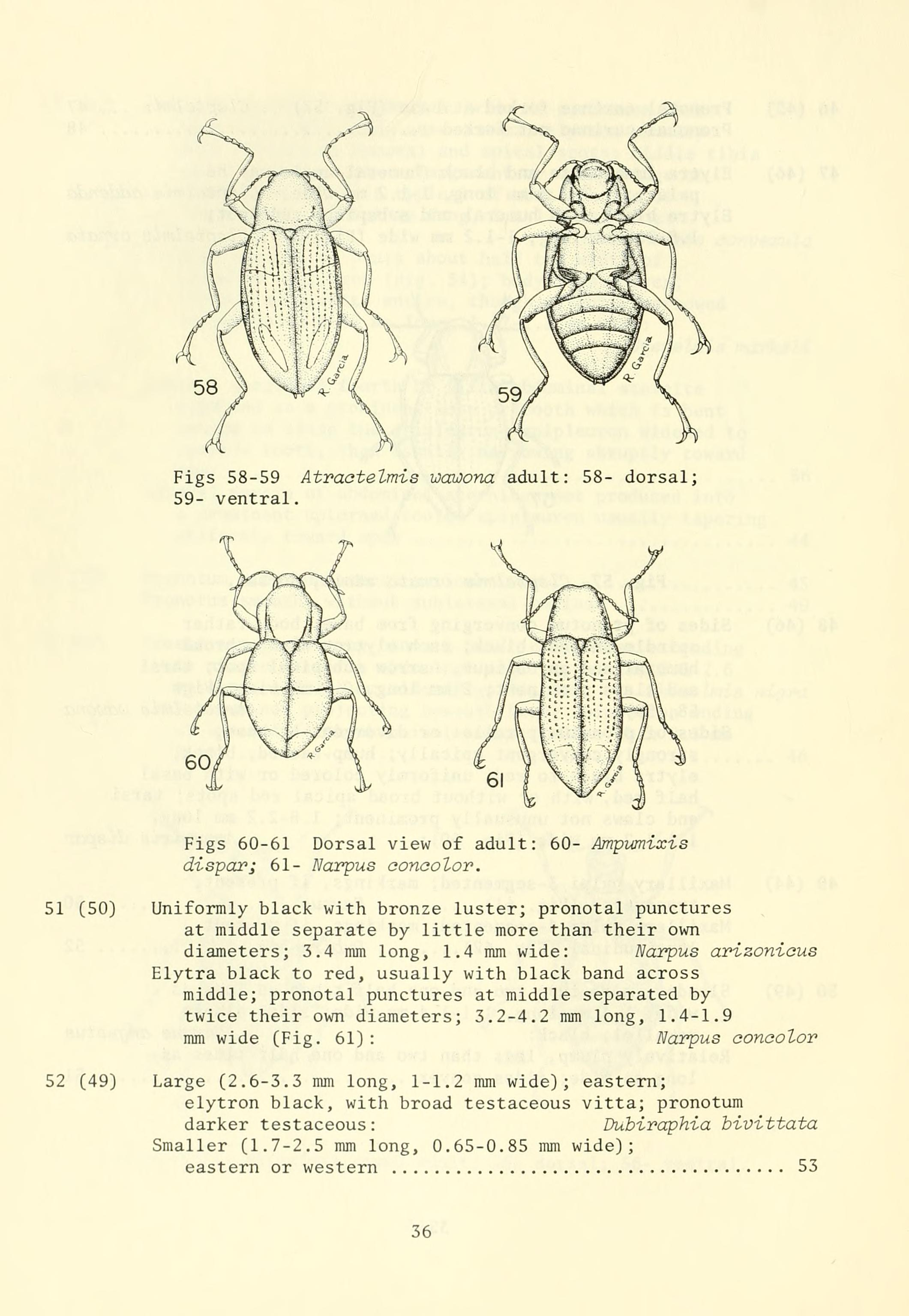
- Ampumixis

Scientific classification
- Kingdom: Animalia
- Phylum: Arthropoda
- Class: Insecta
- Order: Coleoptera
- Suborder: Polyphaga
- Infraorder: Elateriformia
- Family: Elmidae
- Genus: Ampumixis; Sanderson, 1954
- Species: A. dispar

Binomial name
- Ampumixis dispar (Fall, 1925)

Synonyms
- Helmis dispar Fall, 1925

= Ampumixis =

Genus of beetles

Ampumixis is a genus of riffle beetles in the family Elmidae. The genus is monotypic, the sole species being Ampumixis dispar. It is endemic to the Western United States between California and Oregon.

Adults measure about 2.1–2.5 mm (0.083–0.098 in) in length and 1.2–1.25 mm (0.047–0.049 in) in width.
