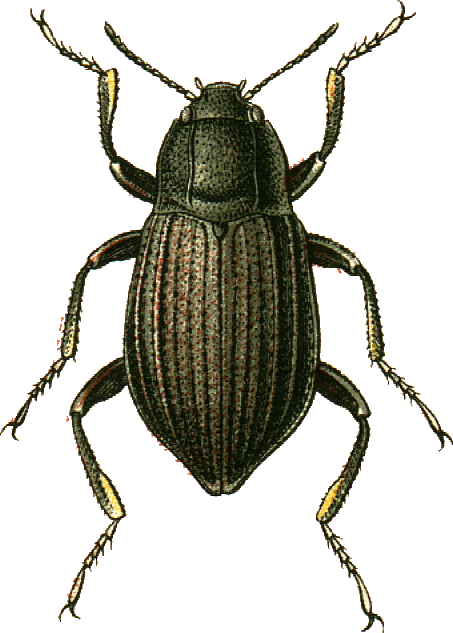
- Elmis aeneus

Scientific classification
- Kingdom: Animalia
- Phylum: Arthropoda
- Class: Insecta
- Order: Coleoptera
- Suborder: Polyphaga
- Infraorder: Elateriformia
- Family: Elmidae
- Genus: Elmis; Latreille, 1802

= Elmis =

Genus of beetles

Elmis is a genus of beetles belonging to the family Elmidae.

The species of this genus are found in Europe and Northern America.

Species:

- Elmis aenea (Müller, 1806)
- Elmis atlantis (Alluaud, 1922)
