= Ctenelmis =

Scientific classification
- Kingdom: Animalia
- Phylum: Arthropoda
- Class: Insecta
- Order: Coleoptera
- Suborder: Polyphaga
- Infraorder: Elateriformia
- Family: Elmidae
- Genus: Ctenelmis; Delève, 1964

Species
- Ctenelmis crinipes Delève, 1966; Ctenelmis discrepans Delève, 1964 (type); Ctenelmis elegans Delève, 1966; Ctenelmis harrisoni Delève, 1964; Ctenelmis incerta (Grouvelle, 1890); Ctenelmis lata Delève, 1964; Ctenelmis rufipes Delève, 1966; Ctenelmis tibialis Delève, 1966

Genus of beetles

Ctenelmis is a genus of riffle beetles (insects in the family Elmidae). Species are found near rivers in South Africa.
