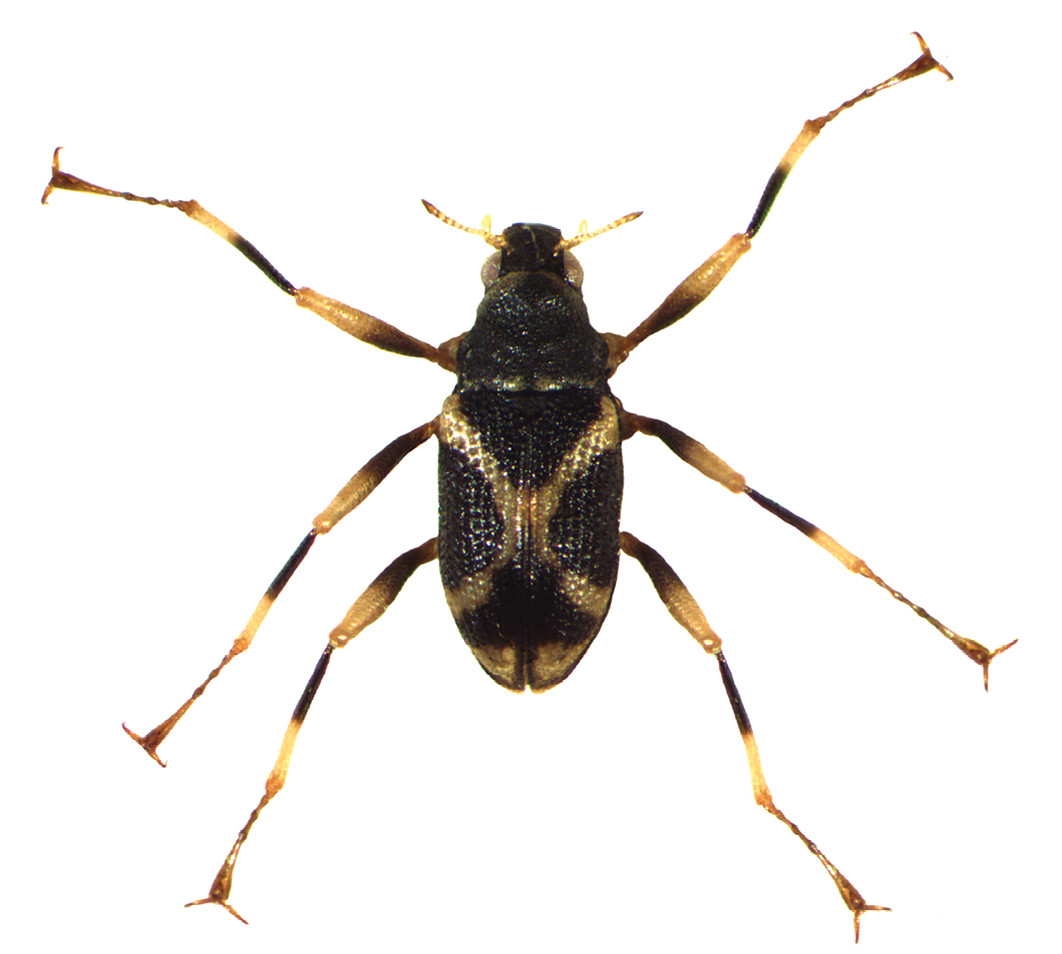
- Ancyronyx schillhammeri

Scientific classification
- Kingdom: Animalia
- Phylum: Arthropoda
- Clade: Pancrustacea
- Class: Insecta
- Order: Coleoptera
- Suborder: Polyphaga
- Infraorder: Elateriformia
- Superfamily: Byrrhoidea
- Family: Elmidae; Curtis, 1830

Subfamilies
- Elminae Curtis, 1830; Larainae LeConte, 1861

Diversity
- at least 150 genera

= Elmidae =

Elmidae Temporal range: Cenomanian–Recent

Family of beetles

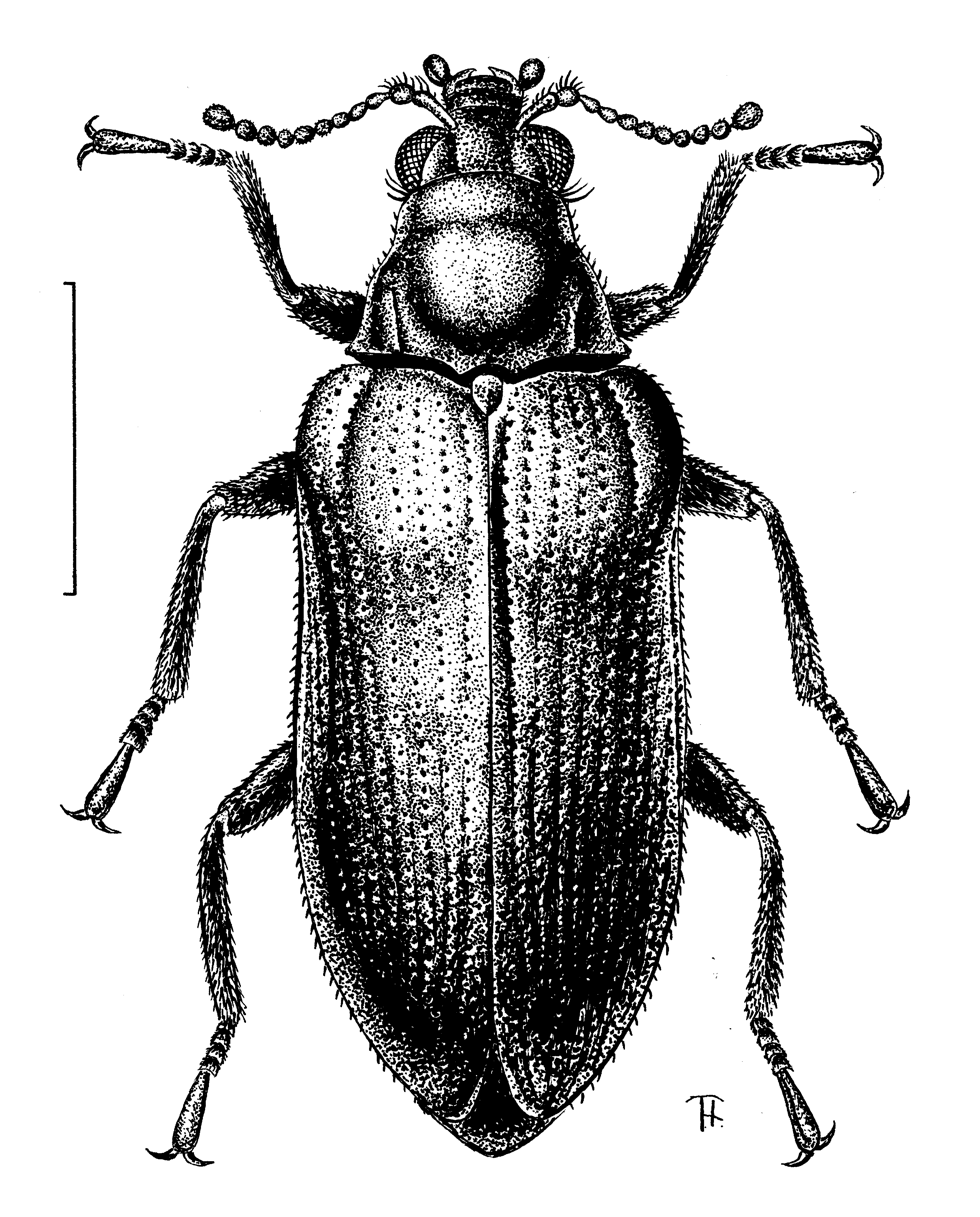
Hydora picea illustration by Des Helmore

Elmidae, commonly known as riffle beetles, is a family of beetles in the superfamily Byrrhoidea described by John Curtis in 1830. Both adults and larvae are usually aquatic, living under rocks in fast-flowing shallow areas of streams, such as riffles, feeding on algae and biofilms. There are more than 150 genera and 1,500 described species in Elmidae. The oldest record of the group is Cretohypsilara from the Cenomanian aged Burmese amber.

== See also ==
- List of Elmidae genera
