= August 1927 =

Month of 1927

<<	August 1927					>>
Su	Mo	Tu	We	Th	Fr	Sa
	1	2	3	4	5	6
7	8	9	10	11	12	13
14	15	16	17	18	19	20
21	22	23	24	25	26	27
28	29	30	31

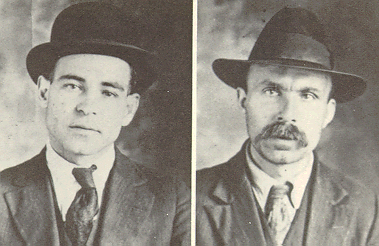
August 23, 1927: Sacco and Vanzetti executed in the electric chair

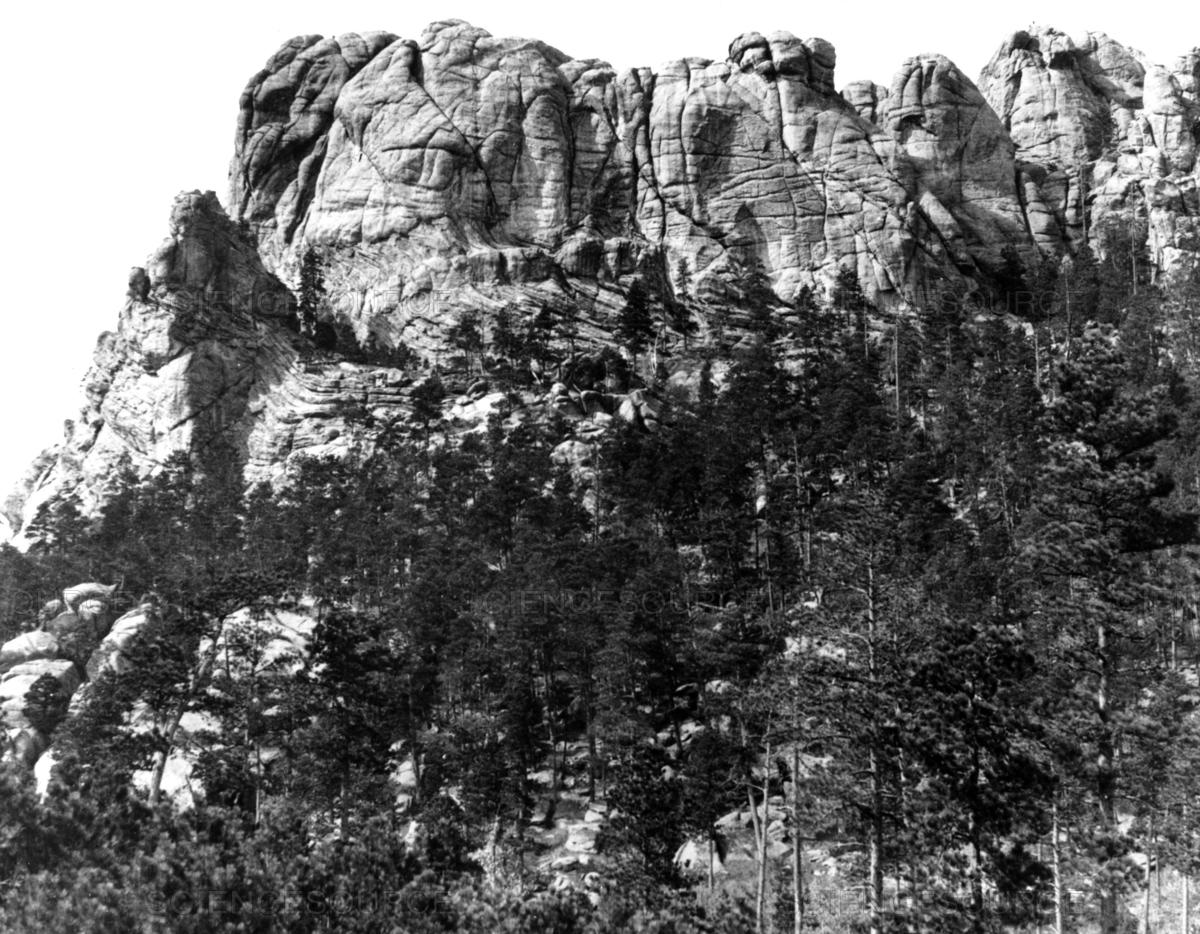
August 10, 1927: Carving to begin at Mount Rushmore

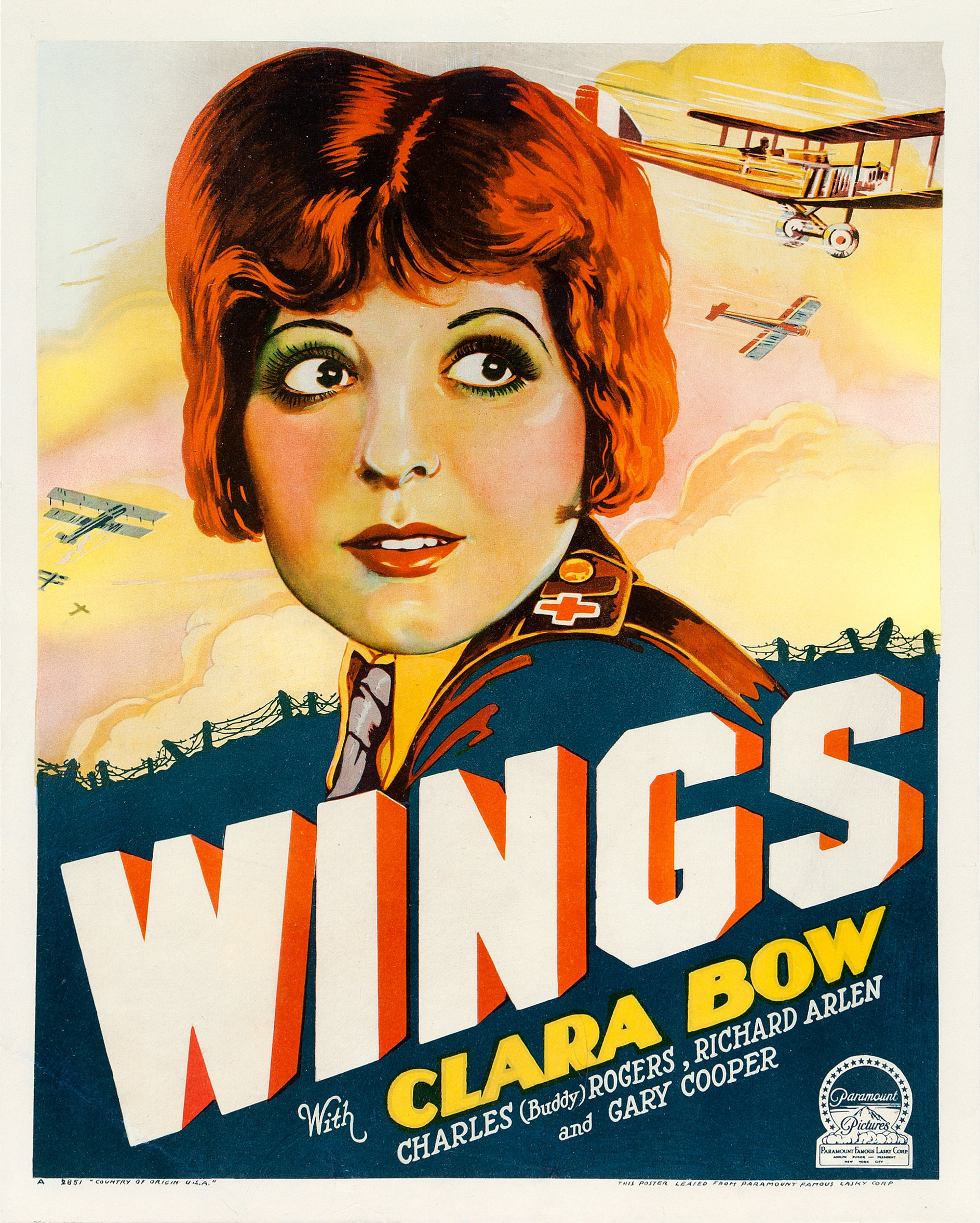
August 12, 1927: Sound effects introduced to moviegoers by Wings

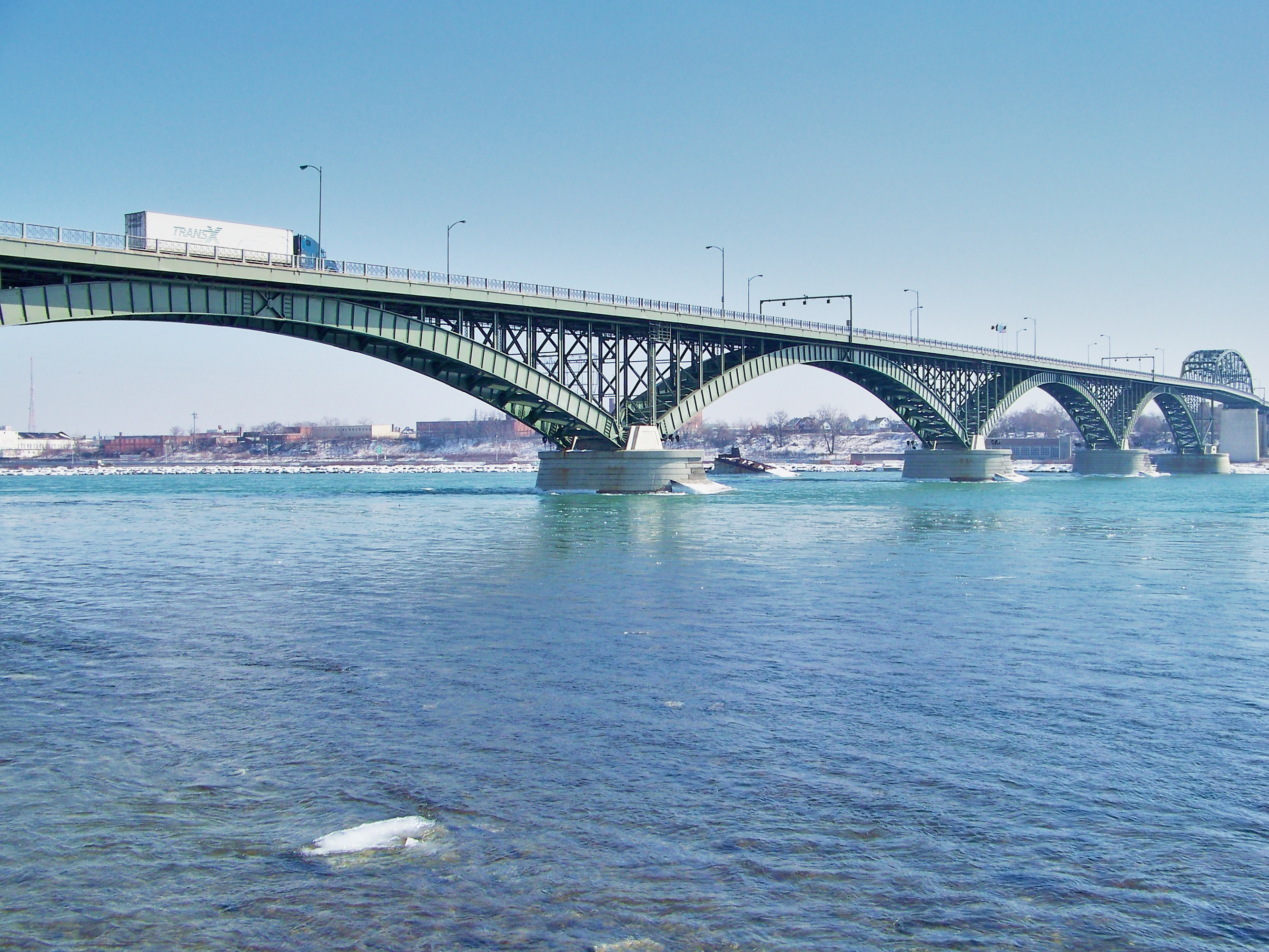
August 7, 1927: Peace Bridge opened between U.S. and Canada

The following events occurred in August 1927:

== August 1, 1927 (Monday) ==
- The Nanchang Uprising began as a pivotal event that created the China's People's Liberation Army, as 20,000 of the Communist members of the Twentieth Army of the Kuomintang revolted and took control of the city of Nanchang, capital of the Jiangxi Province. The rebels dispersed four days later when the Nationalists counter-attacked, but the new Chinese Red Army planned other attacks. Among the participants were future Prime Minister Zhou Enlai, the later to be disgraced Lin Biao, and future Marshals Zhu De, General He Long, Ye Ting, Liu Bocheng, Nie Rongzhen and Luo Ruiqing and Lin Biao. August 1 is still celebrated annually as "Army Day".
- The Carter Family, led by A. P. Carter and described as "the first band sensation in country music history", recorded the first of many bestselling records. Their debut single, made at a studio in Bristol, Tennessee, was "Bury Me Beneath the Willow".
- The Japanese minelaying ship Tokiwa was heavily damaged while trying to deactivate armed mines in the Saiki Bay. One of the floating mines exploded, setting off a chain reaction in seventeen other mines. Thirty-five of the crew were killed and another sixty-eight seriously injured.
- The Leningrad Oblast, one of the largest in Soviet Union, was formed by the consolidation of the lands around Leningrad, Murmansk, Novgorod, Cherepovets, and Pskov. Over the next fifteen years, the oblast would be broken up again.

== August 2, 1927 (Tuesday) ==
- While on an extended vacation in Rapid City, South Dakota, U.S. President Calvin Coolidge closed his weekly 9:30 am press conference with a directive to return at noon for a special announcement. When the newspapermen returned to Coolidge's office, located at Central High School, the President told them, "Will you please file past me? I have a little statement for you." Each reporter was handed a folded slip of paper with one typewritten statement: "I do not choose to run for President in nineteen twenty-eight." A reporter asked, "Does the president care to comment further?" The laconic Coolidge replied, "No", and left the room. The surprise had been timed so that it could not make the news until after the close of trade on the stock markets. Speculation about the Republican candidate for president in 1928 included Secretary of Commerce Herbert Hoover and former Illinois Governor Frank O. Lowden.

== August 3, 1927 (Wednesday) ==
- Sixteen miners were killed in an explosion at the West Kentucky Coal Company Mine Number 7 at Clay, Kentucky. The disaster occurred one day before the tenth anniversary of an explosion, on August 4, 1917, at the very same mine, which had killed 67 coal miners.
- Massachusetts Governor Alvan T. Fuller denied a request for clemency for Nicola Sacco and Bartolomeo Vanzetti after reviewing arguments concerning the fairness of their murder trial. Fuller wrote, "As a result of my investigation I find no sufficient justification for executive intervention. I believe with the jury, that those men, Sacco and Vanzetti, were guilty and they had a fair trial." The two men had been given a temporary reprieve on their execution, due to expire on August 10. Whether Fuller actually investigated the case is doubted by some historians.
- The SS Carl D. Bradley sailed for the first time. The freighter would sink in Lake Michigan in 1958, drowning 33 of its 35 crew.
- Died: William Harvey Thompson, 24, American Bureau of Prohibition agent in Seattle, died one week after being shot on July 27 by a patrolman of the Tacoma police department. After an investigation, the administrator of the Seattle prohibition office concluded that the patrolman had acted in self-defense.

== August 4, 1927 (Thursday) ==
- Radio station WFAA in Dallas did the first "rebroadcast" of a news report, repeating NBC Radio's June 11 report of Charles Lindbergh's parade in Washington. Four phonograph records had been made from the broadcast by the RCA Victor company.
- Three days after the Carter Family had cut their debut single in the same studio, Jimmie Rodgers recorded his first country song. At Bristol, Tennessee, he sang the "yodeling lullaby", "Sleep, Baby, Sleep" and "The Soldier's Sweetheart"
- Born:
  - Jess Thomas, American tenor, in Hot Springs, South Dakota (d. 1993)
  - Eddie Kamae, American singer who led music's Hawaiian Renaissance; in Honolulu (d. 2017)
- Died: Eugène Atget, 70, French surrealist photographer

== August 5, 1927 (Friday) ==
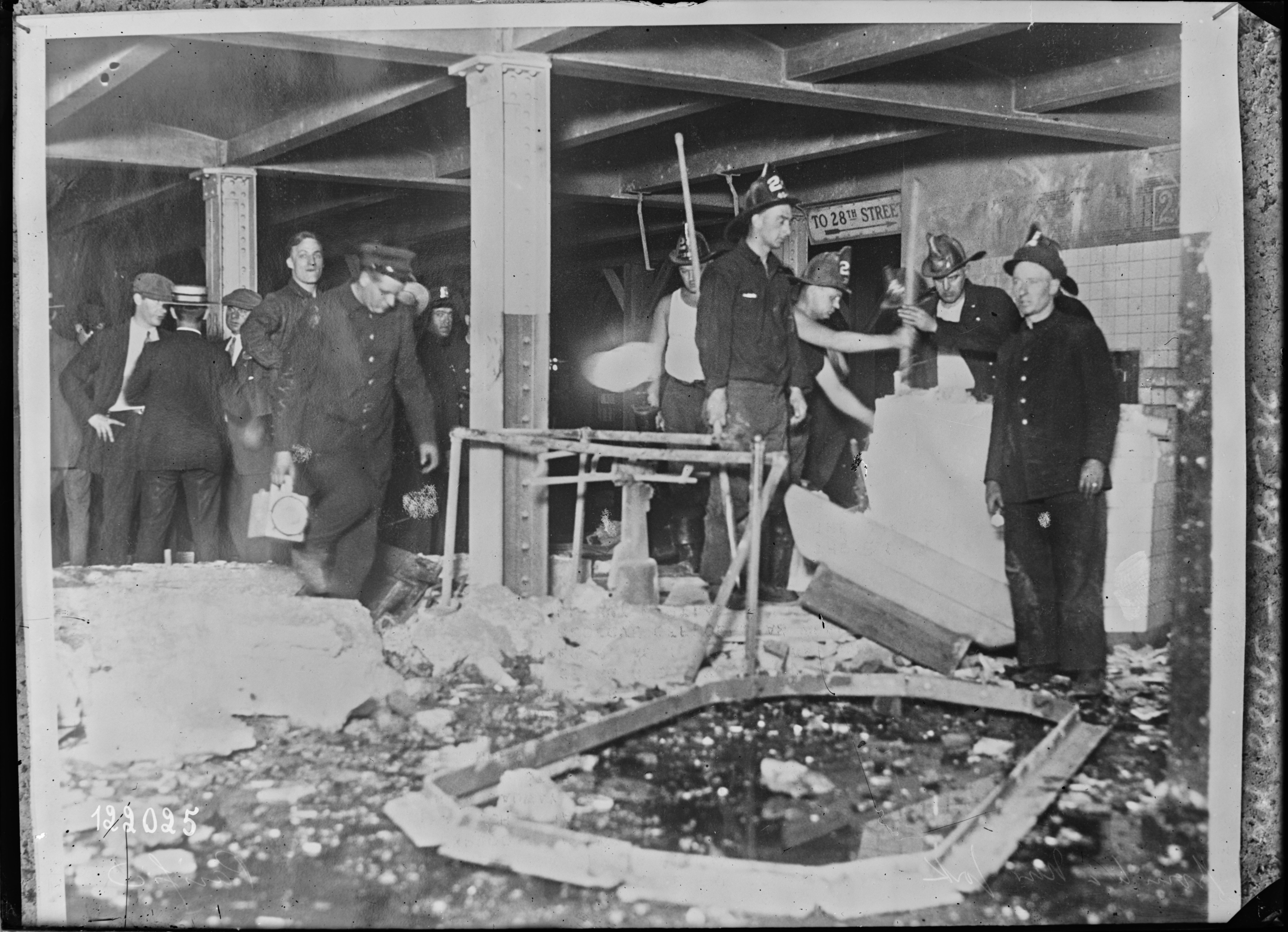
28th Street subway bombing

- The U.S. Federal Reserve Board cut the prime lending rate at the same time that British Chancellor of the Exchequer Winston Churchill placed Britain back on to the gold standard. The action, taken in order to protect the British government from the possibility of the British pound being devalued against the U.S. dollar. This has been described as the first time in history "that one of the world's great economic powers altered its macroeconomic policy with the aim of supporting a minor currency".
- A previously unknown species of beetle, the Gehringia olympica, was discovered by Philip Darlington, who collected eight specimens at the Sol Duc River in the state of Washington. Darlington named the beetle in honor of J.G. Gehring, who had sponsored the expedition.
- Following the denial of clemency to Sacco and Vanzetti, bombs exploded at two subway stations on New York City's 28th Street, seriously injuring two people and hurting many others. The threat of violent protests put police on alert worldwide.

== August 6, 1927 (Saturday) ==
- Harold Stephen Black invented the negative feedback amplifier. Four days earlier, he had come up with the idea while riding the Lackawanna Ferry across the Hudson River to his New York job.
- The forerunner of the breathalyzer was first demonstrated by Professor Rolla H. Harger of Indiana University, who showed how breath contained in a balloon could be dispersed into sulfuric acid and then accurately measured to calculate blood alcohol content. Harger would patent the "Drunkometer" in 1938 for use by police.
- Born: Richard Murphy, Irish poet, in County Mayo (d. 2018)

== August 7, 1927 (Sunday) ==
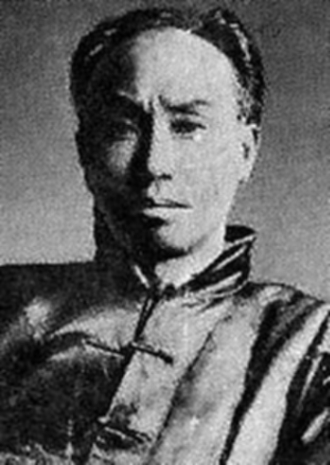
Chairman Chen

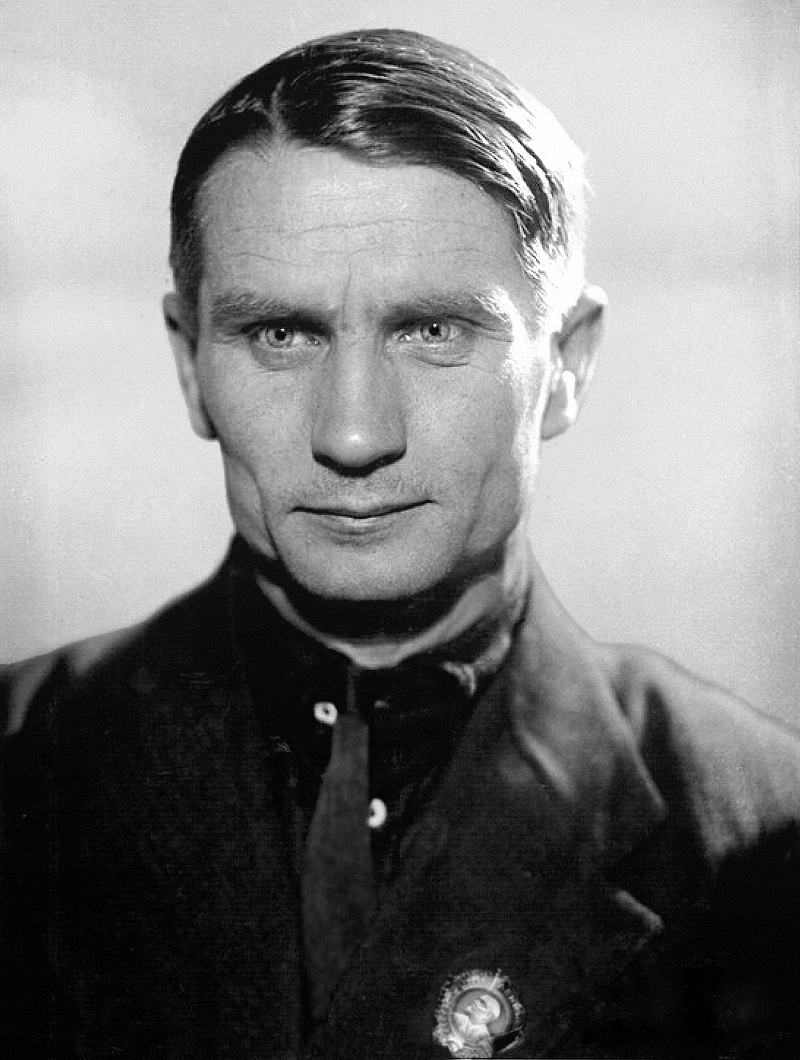
Dr. Lysenko

- At an emergency meeting of the Chinese Communist Party, convened in Hankou by the Vissarion Lominadze Soviet representative of Comintern, Secretary General Chen Duxiu (Ch'en Tu-hsiu) was deposed as the CCP's leader, and replaced by Qu Qiubai (Ch'u Ch'iu-pai). At the meeting, future Party Chairman Mao Zedong made the oft-quoted statement that "political power is obtained out of the barrel of a gun".
- The Peace Bridge opened between Fort Erie, Ontario, and Buffalo, New York, as British Prime Minister Stanley Baldwin, Edward, Prince of Wales, U.S. Vice President Charles G. Dawes, U.S. Secretary of State Frank B. Kellogg, and New York Governor Al Smith, met at the center of the span. Mrs. Dawes, and Mrs. W.D. Ross, wife of the Deputy Premier of Ontario, cut the ribbon with golden shears.
- Trofim Lysenko, whose discredited ideas about genetics would dominate Soviet thought during the era of Joseph Stalin, first came to national attention in the Soviet Union as the subject of a feature story in Pravda.
- Born:
  - Carl "Alfalfa" Switzer, American actor and singer in the Little Rascals comedies (killed, 1959)
  - Edwin Edwards, three-time Governor of Louisiana between 1972 and 1996, who was later convicted of racketeering; in Marksville, Louisiana (d. 2021)
  - George Busbee, Governor of Georgia 1975–83, in Vienna, Georgia (d. 2004)
- Died:
  - Pope Cyril V of Alexandria, 96, Patriarch of the Coptic Christian Church since 1874
  - U.S. Army Major General Leonard Wood, Governor-General of the Philippines, 66
  - Arthur T. Walker, 49, multimillionaire who had inherited most of the estate of Edward F. Searles.

== August 8, 1927 (Monday) ==
- The Manila Stock Exchange, first stock market in the Philippines, was established by five American businessmen. In 1994, it and the rival Makati Stock Exchange would merge to create the Philippine Stock Exchange.
- Pilot Clarence Chamberlin demonstrated a method for speeding up the delivery of overseas mail, by flying his airplane from the deck of the cruise ship Leviathan, to New York for the first ship to shore delivery.
- Standard Oil of New Jersey President Walter C. Teagle announced a deal with German chemical cartel IG Farben to produce synthetic motor fuel at a lower price than that refined strictly from oil. Manufacturing using the Bergius process proved to be more expensive than expected. By 1931, synthetic oil cost six times as much as natural petroleum, after both companies had lost millions on the investment.
- Born: Johnny Temple, American baseball player (d. 1994)

== August 9, 1927 (Tuesday) ==
- A crowd of 100,000 protesters rallied at Union Square in New York on the eve of the scheduled execution of Sacco and Vanzetti. After the meeting, 2,000 of the protesters marched down Fifth Avenue, where police dispersed them. On the same day, at least 70,000 workers nationwide walked off their jobs.
- Born: Marvin Minsky, American computer scientist, philosopher and 1970 Turing Award winner; in New York City (d. 2016).

== August 10, 1927 (Wednesday) ==
- The upcoming artistic project on Mount Rushmore was dedicated by President Calvin Coolidge, who promised national funding for the carving and praised, as described later, George Washington for founding America, Jefferson for expanding it, Lincoln for preserving it and Roosevelt for reaching out to the world. Coolidge then handed sculptor Gutzon Borglum a set of drills, and Borglum climbed to the top of the mountain and began drilling where Washington's head would one day be.
- The French Chamber of Deputies repealed a law that had previously taken away French citizenship from women who married foreigners. There had been no analogous law taking away citizenship of French men with foreign wives.
- Forty minutes before they were scheduled to go to the electric chair, Sacco and Vanzetti, along with Celestino Madeiros, were given a twelve-day reprieve by Governor Fuller. The Governor had been notified by the Massachusetts Supreme Court that it would announce at noon Thursday whether it would reconsider the case. The condemned men were informed at 11:27 pm.
- Navy Lieutenants George Covell and R.W. Waggener crashed shortly after takeoff from San Diego, where they had planned to be part of the field for the Dole Air Race. They were only the first of many casualties associated with the ill-fated competition.
- Born:
  - Vainu Bappu, Indian astronomer, and co-discoverer of the Wilson–Bappu effect, which permits the judgment of the absolute magnitude of certain types of stars; in Madras (d. 1982)
  - Jimmy Martin, American musician known as "The King of Bluegrass"; in Sneedville, Tennessee (d.2005)

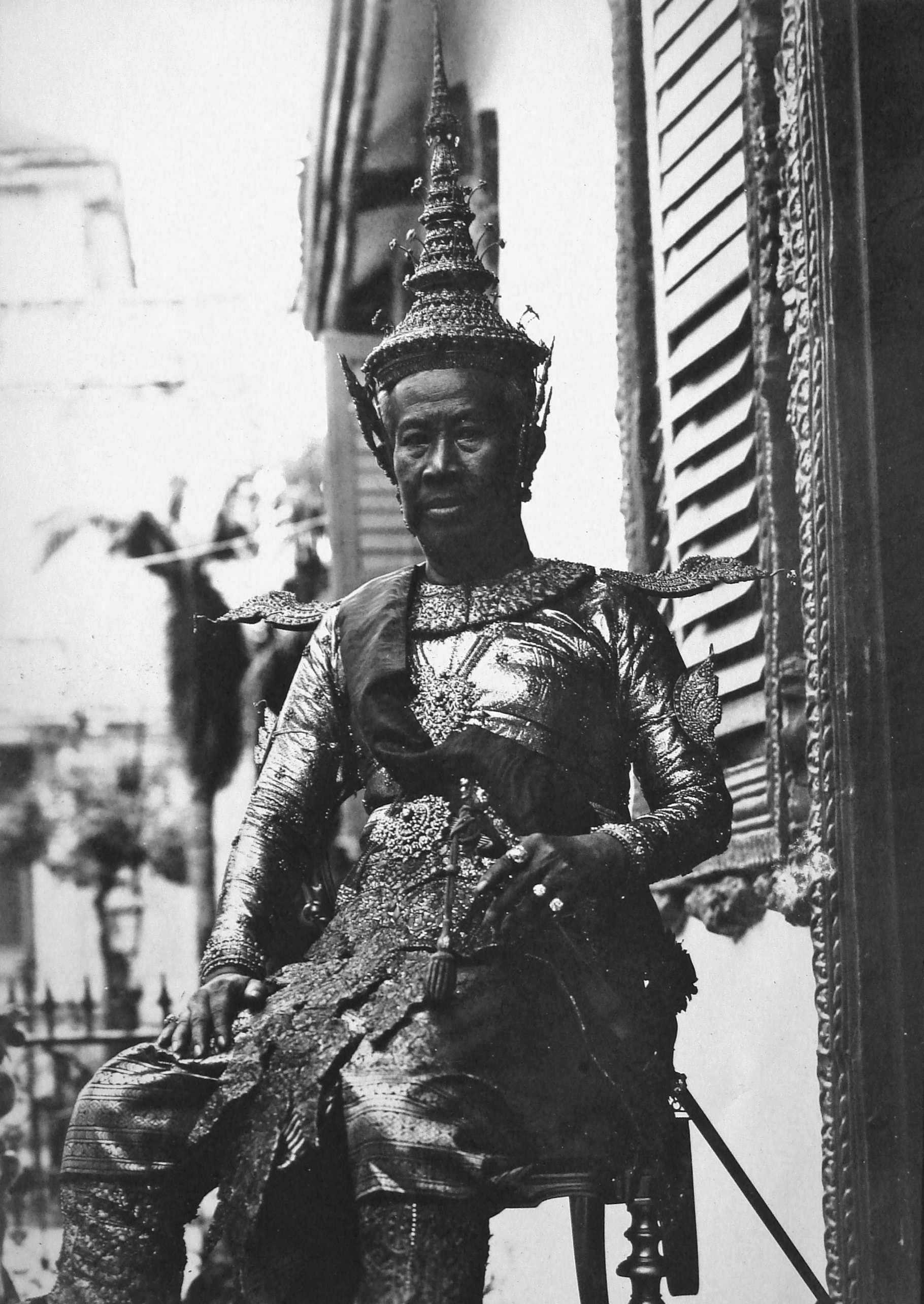
King Sisowath

- Died: King Sisowath of Cambodia, 86, monarch of the French protectorate since 1904. He was succeeded by his son, King Sisowath Monivong

== August 11, 1927 (Thursday) ==
- Members of the Irish Independence Party, Fianna Fáil, led by Éamon de Valera, decided to take their seats in the Parliament of the Irish Free State, the Dáil Éireann, even though it would require them to sign an oath of allegiance to the King. Witnesses would later report that de Valera solved the ethical dilemma by covering the written oath with his hand while applying his signature.

== August 12, 1927 (Friday) ==
- The Bardo Thodol was first published in the United States as The Tibetan Book of the Dead.
- British pilot Arthur V. Rogers was killed while practicing at Los Angeles for the Dole Air Race to Honolulu, in the third plane crash in as many days for participants. After the deaths of Covell and Waggener on Wednesday, the triplane "Pride of Los Angeles" plunged into the San Francisco Bay on Thursday and its crew of three narrowly escaped drowning. The crews of the nine remaining planes postponed the start of the race from Saturday to Tuesday.
- The film Wings was first presented. Starring Clara Bow and introducing Gary Cooper, the movie was accompanied by recorded sound effects of the various airplanes seen, but not spoken dialogue. It was the first, and only silent film to win the Academy Award for Best Picture.
- Born: Porter Wagoner, American country music singer, in West Plains, Missouri (d. 2007)
- Died: Francis Marion Snow, 46, American murderer known as "The Butcher of Stephenville" for his 1925 murder of his wife, his stepson and his mother-in-law, was executed in the electric chair at the Texas State penitentiary in Huntsville, Texas. Snow's last words as he sat in the electric chair were, reportedly, "There has never been a better man sit in this thing."

== August 13, 1927 (Saturday) ==
- After the disaster at Nanchang, General Chiang Kai-shek resigned rather than be fired as commander of the Kuomintang Army, and temporarily retired to his native village of Xikou.
- The first live sports broadcast on Japanese radio took place with the play-by-play on the national middle-school baseball tournament in Tokyo. Because of radio censorship rules requiring advance approval by the Ministry of Communication of scripts, permission was granted only on condition that a Ministry official sit next to the announcer to prevent any inappropriate statements. Radio broadcasting had begun on March 22, 1925.
- Born: (according to some sources) Fidel Castro, Cuban dictator from 1959 onward, in Birán (d. 2016). Although the official birthdate for Castro is August 13, 1926, several of his siblings in exile stated that their father lied about the year in order for him to enroll earlier in school.
- Died: James Oliver Curwood, 49, America novelist and conservationist. Curwood had been bitten by an insect while on a fishing trip in Florida, and died of blood poisoning on his return to his home in Owosso, Michigan

== August 14, 1927 (Sunday) ==
- The first tournament for the Mitropacup opened with eight teams drawn from the top finishers and the cup winners of the national soccer football leagues of Austria, Hungary, Yugoslavia and Czechoslovakia. Sparta Praha would defeat Rapid Wien in the two game final to win the first cup.
- Herbert Lord, the Director of the U.S. Bureau of the Budget (now the OMB), announced that there was a surplus of more than two billion dollars in the federal budget. He gave the precise figure of $2,392,909,074.38 for the amount saved.
- Astronomer C.T. Elvey announced from the Yerkes Observatory in Chicago that the Sun could explode any minute, and added, "If the sun should explode, we would know of it in eight minutes and we would have 138 hours more to live. At that time the burning gases would reach the earth and we would be annihilated."

== August 15, 1927 (Monday) ==
- In East Milton, Massachusetts, the home of Lewis McHardy, who had been one of the jurors who had convicted Sacco and Vanzetti of murder, was destroyed by a bomb that went off at 3:30 in the morning. McHardy, his wife and three children survived with only cuts and bruises. After the two men were put to death, the homes of their executioner and of trial judge Webster Thayer were bombed on May 17, 1928, and September 27, 1932, respectively.
- Rollo Gallagher of Salt Lake City, Utah, was fatally burned when he fell into a hot spring near Firehole Lake in Lower Geyser Basin at Yellowstone National Park. Although advised to go to a nearby hospital, Gallagher chose to drive back to Salt Lake City and died after he arrived there.
- Born: Patrick Galvin, Irish poet, in Cork City (d. 2011)
- Died: Elbert H. Gary, 81, President of the United States Steel Company. He died at 2:40 am, but his death was not announced until after the close of trading on Wall Street.

== August 16, 1927 (Tuesday) ==
- With three competitors already out because of crashes, the ill-fated Dole Air Race began with eight airplanes taking off from Oakland, California, at noon to fly 2,400 miles to Honolulu, Hawaii. The stakes were $25,000 for first place, and $10,000 for second place. Two of the planes— El Encanto and the Pabeo Flyer— crashed on takeoff, weighed down by the gasoline. The Dallas Spirit and the Oklahoma both took to the air, but were forced to return with engine problems. Only two planes— Aloha and Woolarac — would successfully arrive in Hawaii.
- In an 8–1 win by his New York Yankees over the Chicago White Sox, slugger Babe Ruth hit a home run that cleared the roof of the right field grandstands at Comiskey Park by a considerable margin. A contemporary account from the Chicago Tribune said that "Such a blow started from Wrigley Field would jeopardize the lives of golfers on the Lincoln Park course, it was estimated."
- Born: William Henry Thompson, first African-American recipient of the Medal of Honor in the 20th Century; in New York City (killed in action 1950)
- Died: J. Ogden Armour, 63, heir to the Armour Meat Packing fortune and former president of the company; he lost $130,000,000 in 1921 at his height, he was the world's second richest man, and still had a fortune of twenty million dollars at the time of his death.

== August 17, 1927 (Wednesday) ==
- At 12:33 p.m., local time, Arthur Goebel and Lt. W.V. Davis won the Dole Air Race and its $25,000 prize after being the first to arrive in Honolulu, 26 hours and 16 minutes after they had taken off in the Woolaroc. Coming in second was the Aloha, at 2:22 pm, with Martin Jensen and Paul Schluter capturing the $10,000 second place. Officials waited for the two remaining entrants, the Miss Doran, with Auggy Pedlar, V. R. Knope and Mildred Doran aboard, and the Golden Eagle (with Jack Frost and Gordon Scott), and none of them arrived. The five missing fliers, none of whom were seen again, would bring the number of deaths associated with the race to eight. No trace was found, despite a search of the Pacific route by rescue airplanes. Out of his $10,000 winnings, pilot Jensen gave his navigator, Schulter, only $25.
- Born: Bernard Cornfeld, controversial American investor and financier who operated Investors Overseas Service in the 1970s; in Istanbul (d. 1995)
- Died: Ivar Fredholm, 61, Swedish mathematician who posed the problem and solution of the Fredholm integral equation

== August 18, 1927 (Thursday) ==
- The lowest barometric pressure ever measured at sea level was taken by the crew of the Dutch ship S.S. Sapoerea during a tropical cyclone in the Philippine Sea, at 26.185 inches or 88.673 kilopascals. On October 12, 1979, an estimate of 25.69 in (87.00 kPa) was made by dropsonde observation from an aircraft during Typhoon Tip.
- Born: Rosalynn Carter, American First Lady, 1977 to 1981; as Eleanor Rosalynn Smith, in Plains, Georgia. In 1946 she would marry U.S. Navy Ensign and future U.S. President Jimmy Carter (d. 2023)

== August 19, 1927 (Friday) ==
- On their way to Hawaii to search for five missing fliers who had vanished during the Dole Air Race, Bill Erwin and Al Eichwaldt disappeared after sending a distress call. Their plane, the Dallas Spirit, had been forced out of the race three days earlier. When the search for the three airplanes was called off, the final death toll of the race was ten.
- On his 20th birthday, Bir Bikram Kishore Debbarman was given full powers as the Maharaja of Tripura, one of the princely states of British India.
- In Cleveland, the Terminal Tower was topped off at 708 feet and 52 stories. At the time, it was the second tallest building in the world, second only to the 57 story, 792 foot Woolworth Building in New York.
- Born:
  - L.Q. Jones, American character actor, producer and director; as Justice McQueen Jr., in Beaumont, Texas (d. 2022)
  - Hsing Yun, Chinese Buddhist monk and founder of the Fo Guang Shan order; in Jiangsu (d. 2023)

== August 20, 1927 (Saturday) ==
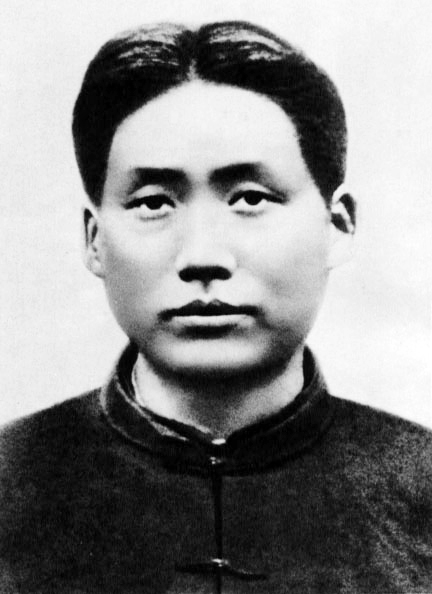
Mao Zedong

- Mao Zedong, a lower level member of the Chinese Communist Party, was approached in Hunan by an agent of the Soviet Union's Comintern, and advised that Moscow wanted the CCP to organize workers, peasants, and soldiers into Communist groups. "Mao's instinct for power," wrote one observer later, "led him to grasp immediately the potential of the message."
- Argentina returned to the gold standard, thirteen years after suspending the export of gold during World War One.
- Born:
  - Peter Oakley, also known as "geriatric1927", former English mechanic who gained fame at age 79 as a YouTube celebrity; in Leicester (d. 2014)
  - Jimmy Raney, American guitarist, in Louisville, Kentucky (d. 1995)
  - Yootha Joyce, English television actress, in Wandsworth (d. 1980)
- Died: Fannie Bloomfield-Zeisler, 64, Austrian-American pianist

== August 21, 1927 (Sunday) ==
- On the final day of the first large scale Nazi Party national congress at Nuremberg, a crowd of 80,000 followers turned out for the main event at 9:00 pm, to hear party leader Adolf Hitler address his loyal followers. The Nuremberg Rallies would become an annual event with each party congress of the NSDAP.
- Born: Thomas S. Monson, President of the LDS Church 2008–2018; in Salt Lake City (d. 2018)
- Died: William Burnside, 75, British mathematician who pioneered group theory

== August 22, 1927 (Monday) ==
- The divorce trial of Charlie Chaplin and Lita Grey Chaplin ended with a settlement with a record verdict, $625,000 to her and a $200,000 trust fund for their sons.
- Died: Louis Agassiz Fuertes, 53, American ornithologist, after his car was struck by a train at a railroad crossing at Unadilla, New York

== August 23, 1927 (Tuesday) ==
- At Charlestown State Prison near Boston, Nicola Sacco, 36 and Bartolomeo Vanzetti, 39 were put to death in the electric chair despite worldwide public outcry. Preceding them in death was Celestino Madeiros, who was executed for an unrelated murder at 12:09 am, but who had sworn that he had committed the 1920 murder of Frederick A. Parmenter and Alexander Berardelli, for which Sacco and Vanzetti had been convicted. Sacco entered the death chamber at 12:11. After reportedly shouting, in Italian, "Long live anarchy!", he then said, in English, "Farewell, mother," and was pronounced dead at 12:19. Vanzetti went to the chair at 12:20 and reportedly said, "I wish to forgive some people for what they are now doing to me." He was pronounced dead at 12:26. All three men were put to death by state executioner Robert G. Elliott.
- Born: Dick Bruna, Dutch illustrator (d. 2017)
- Died: Saad Zaghlul, 68, Egyptian nationalist and former Prime Minister of Egypt (in 1924)

== August 24, 1927 (Wednesday) ==
- During night maneuvers of Japan's Combined Fleet, the battle cruiser Jintsu struck the starboard side of the Warabi and cut it into two, sinking it immediately with 92 of her crew on board. To avoid the collision, the Naka turned sharply and struck the Ashi, killing 27 of its crew.
- The Geneva Naval Conference came to an end after nine weeks, with no agreement on reduction of warship construction, and an increase in tension between the United States and the United Kingdom.
- Ludwig Mies van der Rohe received a patent for a process that allowed the mass production of steel chairs that were both lightweight and strong. (→ Weissenhof chair)
- Born: Harry Markowitz, American economist and 1990 Nobel Prize laureate (d. 2023)
- Died: Manuel Díaz Rodríguez, 56, Venezuelan author of the modernismo movement in Spanish-language literature and former Foreign Minister of Venezuela

== August 25, 1927 (Thursday) ==
- Paul Redfern left Brunswick, Georgia, at noon, flying his Stinson Detroiter Port of Brunswick to attempt a solo non-stop flight to Rio de Janeiro, Brazil. He disappeared the next day and was never seen again; his plane is believed to have crashed in a jungle in Venezuela.
- Born:
  - Althea Gibson, American tennis player and the first African-American to win the Wimbledon championship; in Silver, South Carolina (d. 2003)
  - Albert Uderzo, French cartoonist who illustrated the Asterix comic books (d. 2020)

== August 26, 1927 (Friday) ==
- British scientist Frederick Griffith submitted the first paper ever describing the transforming principle in genetics. "The Significance of Pneumococcal Types" was published in the January issue of the Journal of Hygiene. The search for the cause of the transformation of pneumococcal bacteria would yield the identification of DNA.
- The first radio station in Calcutta (Kolkata), and only the second, after Bombay (Mumbai), in India, began broadcasting. There was not a third station until eight years later.
- An unexpected and fast-moving hurricane in Nova Scotia killed 184 people, most of them fishermen who had been drowned at sea, but also sank the American racing schooner Columbia off of the coast of Sable Island, along with its entire crew of 22 people.
- Chinese warlord Sun Chuanfang led an attack on the city of Nanjing, cutting the electric wires and railroad traffic between that city and Shanghai. Sun was later defeated at the Battle of Lung-tan, after radio broadcasting was used to reopen communications.
- Born: B.V. Doshi, Indian architect, in Pune (d. 2023)

== August 27, 1927 (Saturday) ==
- A group of Canadian women who would become known as the "Famous Five" (Emily Murphy, Irene Parlby, Nellie McClung, Louise Crummy McKinney and Henrietta Muir Edwards) petitioned the Supreme Court of Canada for the right of women to serve in the Senate of Canada. Although they were denied by the nation's high court, they won a victory in the British Privy Council in 1929, opening the door for Canadian women not only to serve in the Senate, but to have the same rights in politics as men.
- Born:
  - Fouad al-Tikerly, prominent Iraqi novelist and writer (d. 2008)
  - Mario Jascalevich, controversial American physician, in Buenos Aires (d. 1984)

== August 28, 1927 (Sunday) ==
- The remains of Nicola Sacco and Bartolomeo Vanzetti were cremated in order to prevent their graves from becoming a shrine. Boston authorities permitted mourners to march in a memorial service. Some 200,000 people lined the funeral procession through Boston.
- Died: Jimmy Clements, 80, Australian Aboriginal elder presented to royalty on the opening of the first Federal Parliament

== August 29, 1927 (Monday) ==
- Near Folsom, New Mexico, Carl Schwachheim found a man-made spearhead imbedded in the skeleton of an ancient bison, proving that human beings had arrived in North America at the end of the last ice age, earlier than believed. Carbon dating later determined that the bison had been killed more than 10,000 years earlier. (→ Folsom point)
- The first World Population Conference opened in Geneva, after having been arranged by Albert Thomas, director of the International Labour Office, and Raymond Pearl, the five-day meeting on population growth did not reach a consensus.
- Born: Marion Williams, African-American gospel singer, in Miami (d. 1994)

== August 30, 1927 (Tuesday) ==
- The Princes' Gates, with a stone archway, pillars and a statue of The Winged Victory, were dedicated in Toronto to mark the 60th anniversary of the 1867 independence of Canada. The gateway to Exhibition Place was named for the two visiting British princes, the future kings Edward VIII and George VI.
- Born: Bill Daily, American comedian and TV actor known as Roger Healey on I Dream of Jeannie and as Howard Borden on The Bob Newhart Show, in Des Moines, Iowa (d. 2018)

== August 31, 1927 (Wednesday) ==
- Princess Anne of Löwenstein-Wertheim-Freudenberg, flying along with pilot Leslie Hamilton and navigator Frederick F. Minchin departed from England to attempt a westward transatlantic crossing and disappeared over the ocean.
- Died: William F. Carver, 76, American entertainer who specialized in sharpshooting, and created the diving horse act for his traveling Wild West show.
