= Phanocerus clavicornis =

Scientific classification
- Kingdom: Animalia
- Phylum: Arthropoda
- Class: Insecta
- Order: Coleoptera
- Suborder: Polyphaga
- Infraorder: Elateriformia
- Family: Elmidae
- Genus: Phanocerus
- Species: P. clavicornis

Binomial name
- Phanocerus clavicornis Sharp, 1882

Synonyms
- Phanocerus helmoides Darlington, 1936; Phanocerus hubbardi Schaeffer, 1911

Species of beetle

Phanocerus clavicornis is a species of riffle beetle in the family Elmidae. It is found in Texas (Southwestern United States), the Caribbean, Middle America, and South America south to southeast Brazil.

Phanocerus clavicornis measure 3 mm (0.12 in) in length.
