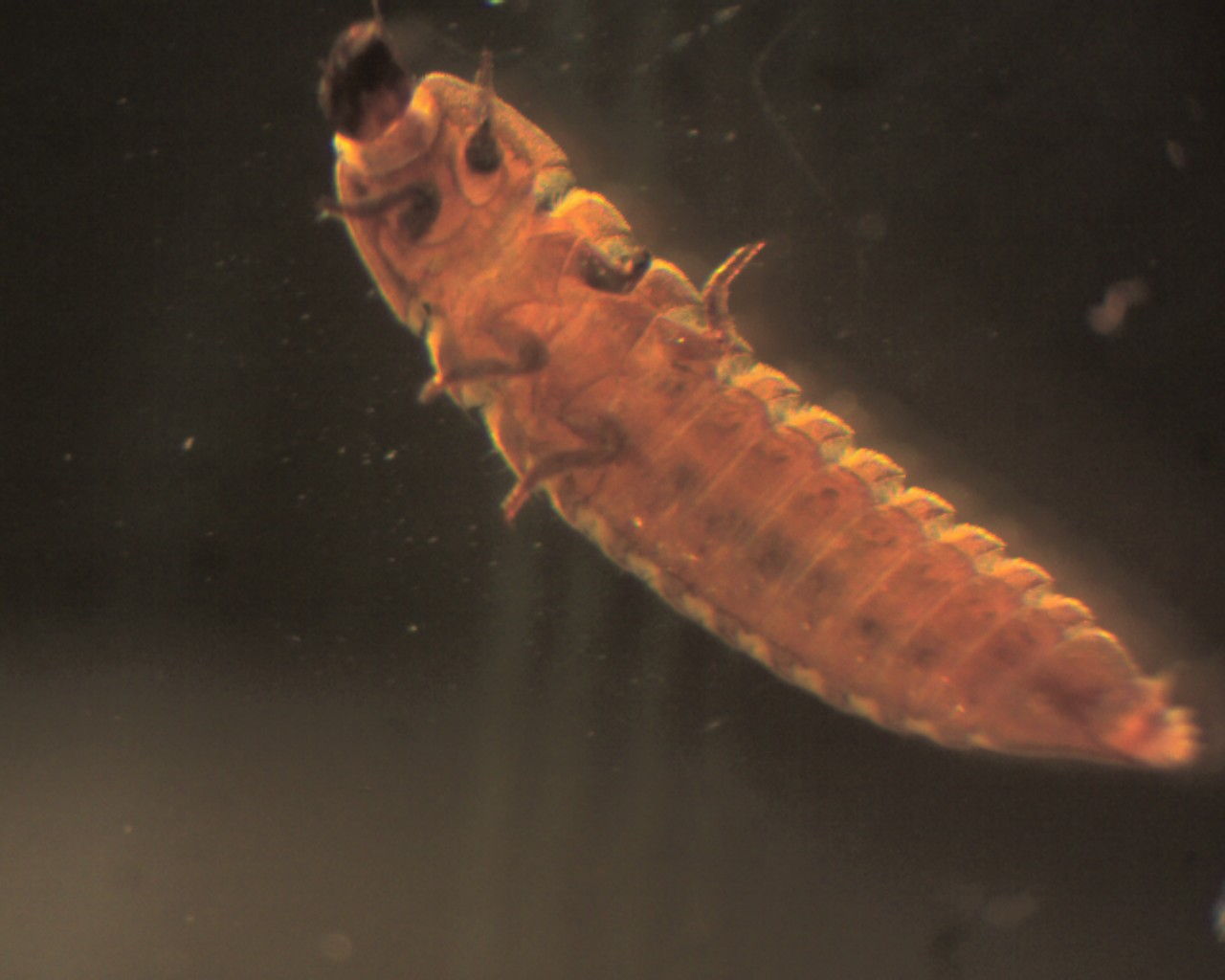
- Phanocerus larva

Scientific classification
- Kingdom: Animalia
- Phylum: Arthropoda
- Class: Insecta
- Order: Coleoptera
- Suborder: Polyphaga
- Infraorder: Elateriformia
- Family: Elmidae
- Subfamily: Larainae
- Genus: Phanocerus; Sharp, 1882

= Phanocerus =

Genus of beetles

Phanocerus is a genus of riffle beetles in the family Elmidae. It is primarily Neotropical, with one species (Phanocerus clavicornis) reaching the Nearctic realm.

== Species ==
These seven species belong to the genus Phanocerus:

- Phanocerus bugnioni Grouvelle, 1902
- Phanocerus charopus Spangler, 1966
- Phanocerus clavicornis Sharp, 1882
- Phanocerus congener Grouvelle, 1898
- Phanocerus guaquira Leal-Duarte, Briceño-Santos and Rincon-Ramírez, 2021
- Phanocerus rufus Maier, 2013
- Phanocerus sharpi Grouvelle, 1896
