= July 1927 =

Month of 1927

| << | July 1927 | | | | | >> |
| Su | Mo | Tu | We | Th | Fr | Sa |
| | | | | | 1 | 2 |
| 3 | 4 | 5 | 6 | 7 | 8 | 9 |
| 10 | 11 | 12 | 13 | 14 | 15 | 16 |
| 17 | 18 | 19 | 20 | 21 | 22 | 23 |
| 24 | 25 | 26 | 27 | 28 | 29 | 30 |
| 31 |

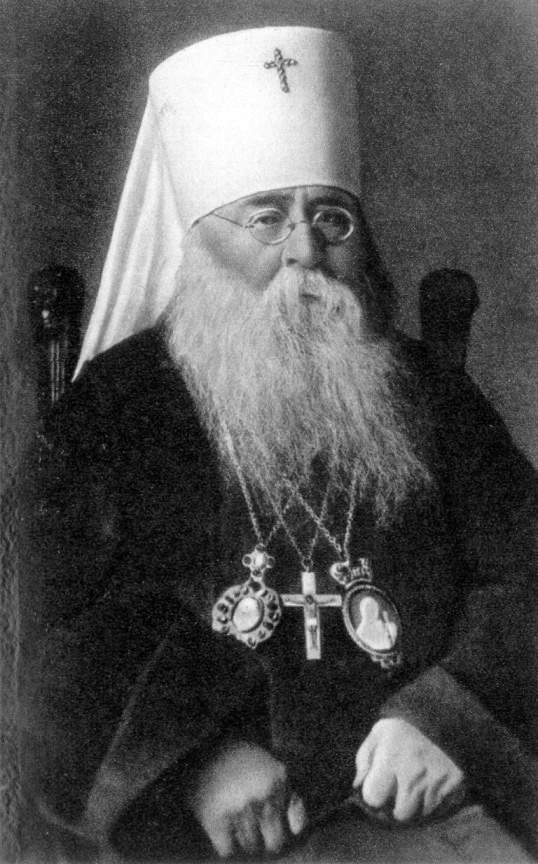
July 29, 1927: Russian Orthodox Church leader orders oath of allegiance to the Soviet government

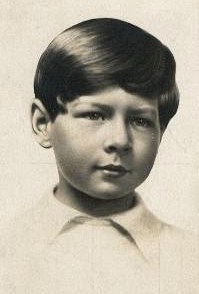
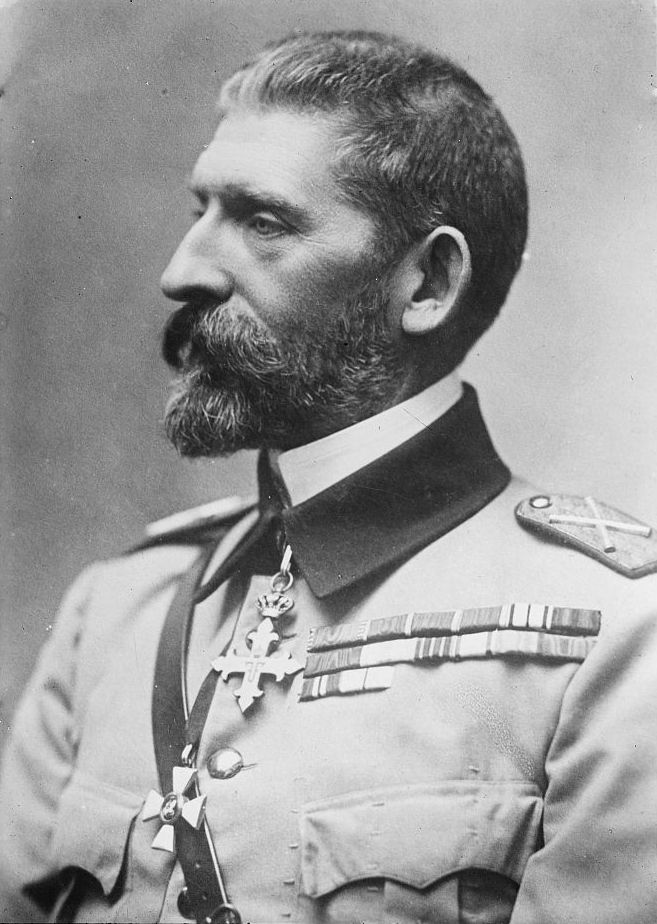
July 20, 1927: Five-year old Michael becomes King of Romania after death of King Ferdinand

July 11, 1927: First 7-Eleven convenience store opens

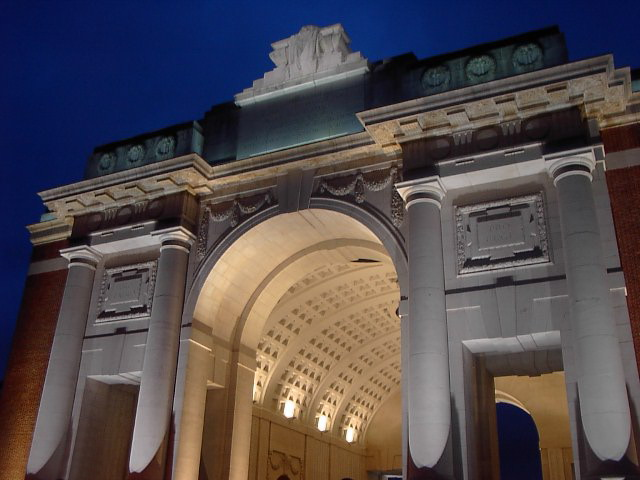
July 24, 1927: The Menin Gate dedicated

The following events occurred in July 1927:

== July 1, 1927 (Friday) ==
- The first coast-to-coast radio network hookup in Canada was made for the celebration of the 60th anniversary of the Dominion.
- The airplane America, along with Commander Richard E. Byrd and its crew, Bert Acosta, George O. Noville and Bert Balchen, crashed into the sea as they attempted to duplicate Charles Lindbergh's flight from New York to Paris. Fortunately, the aviators were within 200 meters of the beach at Ver-sur-Mer when their plane ran out of fuel at 5:45 am, and they survived the ordeal.
- Born:
  - Chandra Shekhar Singh, Prime Minister of India in 1990 and 1991; in Ibrahimpatti, United Provinces of British India (d. 2007)
  - Winfield Dunn, American politician, Governor of Tennessee from 1971 to 1975; in Meridian, Mississippi (d. 2024)

== July 2, 1927 (Saturday) ==
- Jane Eads, reporter for the Chicago Herald and Examiner became the first airline passenger, completing a flight from Chicago to San Francisco, on a Boeing Air Transport Model 40 that was used to transport mail. The airline would later become United Airlines.
- Henri Cochet won the Wimbledon finals over fellow Frenchman Jean Borotra after losing the first two sets, 4–6 and 4–6, then won the next two 6–3, 6–4, and took the match 7–5. The day before, Cochet had made the finals by defeating Bill Tilden in the same come from behind fashion, losing the first 2 sets and winning the other three. Helen Wills became the first American player in 20 years to win the women's singles, beating Spanish champion Lili de Alvarez in straight sets, 6–2, 6–4.
- Lord Norman, Governor of the Bank of England and Hjalmar Schacht of the German Reichsbank met at Long Island with U.S. Undersecretary of the Treasury Ogden L. Mills to make plans to boost the American and world economies.
- Niels Bohr began working on his description of space-time in quantum and wave mechanics
- The Western film The Last Outlaw starring Gary Cooper was released.

== July 3, 1927 (Sunday) ==
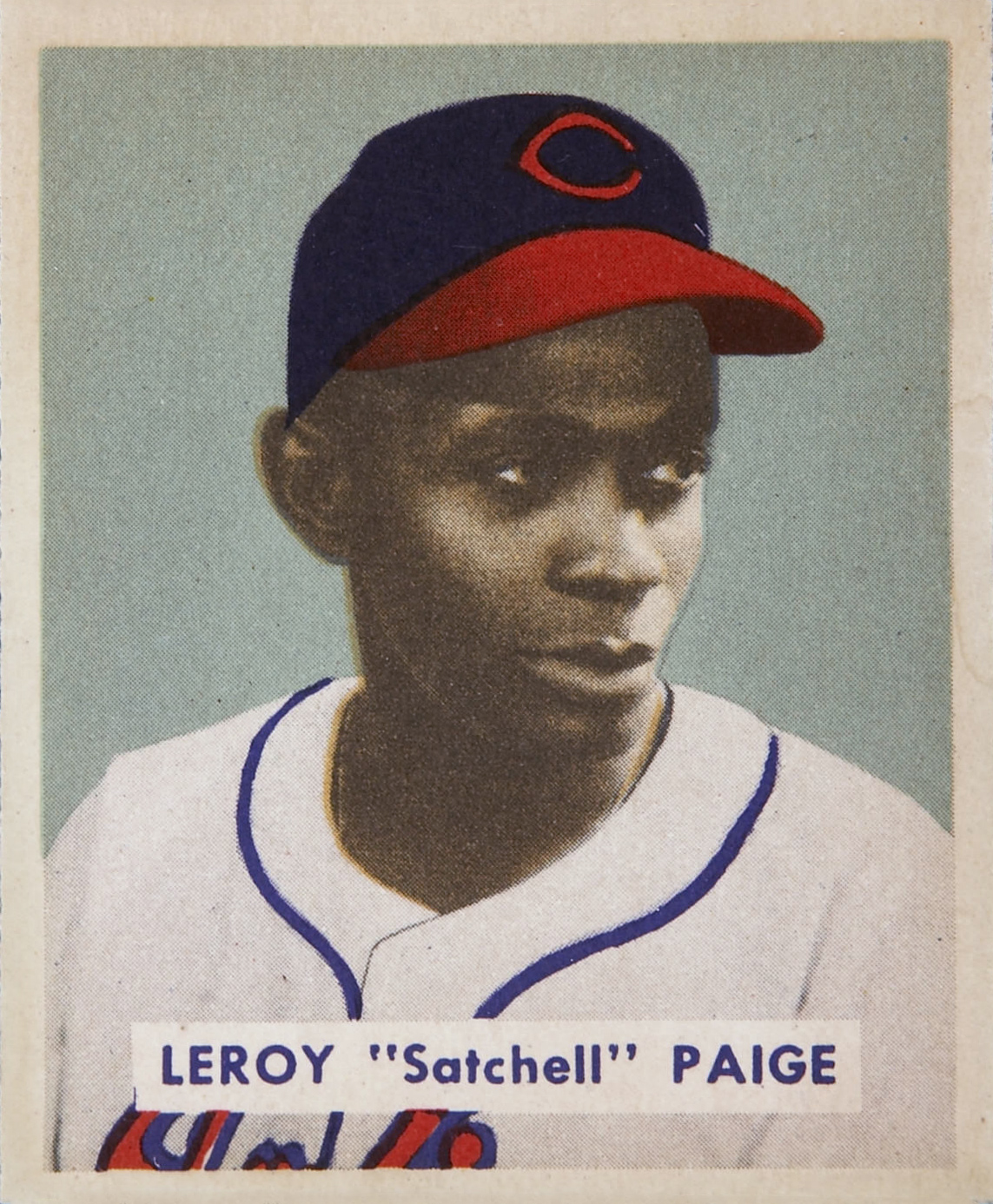

- Satchel Paige made his pro baseball debut in the Negro leagues, pitching for the Birmingham Black Barons in a game at Detroit. After twenty-one years, Paige would, at 42, become the oldest rookie in Major League Baseball, joining the Cleveland Indians in 1948 after the integration of baseball. At 59, he would make his final appearance, pitching for the Kansas City A's.
- Born:
  - Ken Russell, British film director known for Women in Love and Altered States; in Southampton, Hampshire (d. 2011)
  - Salome Thorkelsdottir, Icelandic politician and the first woman (from 1991 to 1995) to have served as the Speaker of the House in that nation's parliament, the Althing; in Reykjavík (alive in 2026)

== July 4, 1927 (Monday) ==
- Sukarno (born Kusno Sosrodihardjo) founded the Perserikatan Nasional Indonesia, seeking independence of the Dutch East Indies colony from the Netherlands. In 1945, he would become the first President of Indonesia.
- The Lockheed Vega, first airplane manufactured by the Lockheed Corporation, made its inaugural flight, with Eddie Belande taking the plane up from Mines Field in Los Angeles.
- Joseph Goebbels published the first issue of the Nazi newspaper, Der Angriff, which promoted Goebbels' views until its last issue in April 1945.
- Born:
  - Neil Simon, American playwright; in the Bronx, New York (d. 2018)
  - Gina Lollobrigida, Italian and American film actress; in Subiaco (d. 2023)

== July 5, 1927 (Tuesday) ==
- The Verein fur Raumschiffahrt (VfR, or Association for Space Travel) was founded at the Goldenes Zepter tavern in Breslau, Germany, (now Wrocław, Poland) by various German rocket scientists including Hermann Oberth, Walter Hohmann and Johannes Winkler,
- Northwest Airlines began passenger service when businessman Byron Webster bought a ticket to fly from Minneapolis to Chicago. The plane took more than 12 hours to complete its journey, after stops in the Wisconsin cities of LaCrosse, Madison and Milwaukee, and Webster arrived in Chicago the next morning at 2:30. Northwest would become one of the largest airlines in the United States, before being merged into Delta Air Lines in 2010.
- The S.S. Presidente Saavedra, the only ship of the Bolivian Naval Force, sank in the harbor outside of Buenos Aires, Argentina.
- Inventor Stanley S. Jenkins applied for the patent for the process that he used to create the corn dog and other deep-fried foods that could be carried on a stick. Under the title "Combined Dipping, Cooking, and Article Holding Apparatus", Jenkins wrote in his application that his invention was for "an apparatus in which a new and novel edible food product may be deep fried... consisting of an article of food impaled on a stick and coated with batter," and added that "I have discovered that articles of food such, for instance, as wieners, boiled ham, hard boiled eggs, cheese, sliced peaches, pineapples, bananas and like fruit, and cherries, dates, figs, strawberries, etc., when impaled on sticks and dipped in a batter... the resultant food product on a stick for a handle is a clean, wholesome and tasty refreshment." U.S. Patent No. 1,706,491 was granted on March 26, 1929.
- Born: Thomas J. Fleming, American historian and novelist; in Jersey City, New Jersey (d. 2017)
- Died: Albrecht Kossel, 73, German physician and 1910 Nobel Prize laureate for his determination of the chemical composition of nucleic acids

== July 6, 1927 (Wednesday) ==
- The Church of England's governing assembly voted 517–133 in favor of the proposed revision of the Book of Common Prayer.
- The song "My Blue Heaven" was recorded for the first time, by Paul Whiteman and his Orchestra, and became one of the year's top-selling records.
- Born:
  - Janet Leigh (stage name for Jeanette Helen Morrison), American film actress known for Psycho and The Fog; in Merced, California (d. 2004)
  - Pat Paulsen, American comedian and perennial presidential candidate; in South Bend, Washington (d. 1997)
  - Alan Freeman, Australian-born British disc jockey who was the long time host of Pick of the Pops; in Melbourne (d. 2006)
  - Dolores Claman, Canadian composer who created the popular theme song for CBC's Hockey Night In Canada; in Vancouver (d. 2021)

== July 7, 1927 (Thursday) ==
- Portuguese neurosurgeon Egas Moniz first presented his discovery of cerebral angiography arterial encephalography in a paper presented at the Societe de Neurologie in Paris. Moniz had discovered a safe method of detecting brain tumors by injecting contrast into the cervical carotid artery.
- In his weekly magazine, The Dearborn Independent, auto manufacturer Henry Ford published an apology, widely reprinted, for his anti-Semitic views. The missive was part of a settlement of a libel lawsuit brought by Aaron Sapiro.
- Under pressure from the victorious Allies of World War I, Germany's Reichstag voted 390–44 to pass a law prohibiting the import or export of war materials.
- Born:
  - Doc Severinsen (stage name for Carl Hilding Severinsen), American bandleader and jazz trumpeter who led the NBC Orchestra for Johnny Carson on The Tonight Show; in Arlington, Oregon
  - Martin Ransohoff, American film and television producer who founded the Filmways production company; in New Orleans (d. 2017)
- Died: Gösta Mittag-Leffler, 81, Swedish mathematician known for Mittag-Leffler's theorem

== July 8, 1927 (Friday) ==
- Charles Lindbergh inaugurated the Transcontinental Air Transport airline with the first passenger flight from New York to Los Angeles. The trip would take 48 hours.

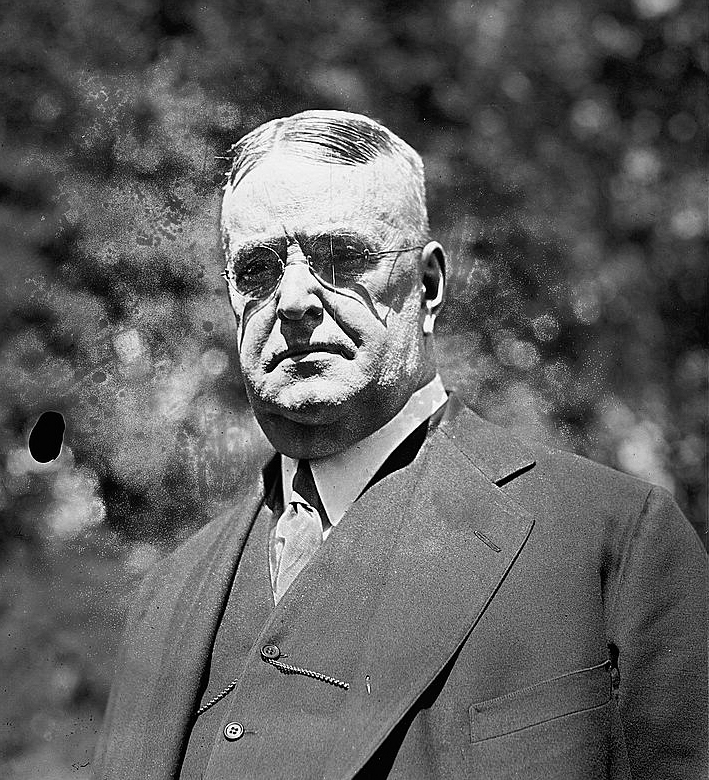
Johnson

- Ban Johnson, founder of the American League and its president since 1901, was forced to resign by the owners of the eight teams.
- Died: Max Hoffmann, 58, German general who led the attack on Russia in World War I

== July 9, 1927 (Saturday) ==
- Torrential rains in Germany swelled the Elbe River and led to flash floods that killed hundreds in Saxony. In the village of Berggießhübel, 93 people drowned when a 7-foot-high wave swept through the town. At least 200 people were reported to have died.
- The Federal Trade Commission outlawed the practice of "block booking" by film distributors, issuing a cease and desist order to Paramount Pictures. Until the FTC order, Paramount required cinemas to rent films as part of a block of movies, usually with the arrangement that a popular film had to be accepted along with several less attractive releases.
- Born:
  - Ed Ames (stage name for Edmund Dantes Urick), American singer for the Ames Brothers and white actor known for portraying American Indian characters, most notably on the Daniel Boone television show; in Malden, Massachusetts(d 2023)
  - Red Kelly (Leonard Patrick Kelly), Canadian NHL star and Hockey Hall of Fame inductee (d. 2019)
- Died:
  - John Drew, Jr., 73, American stage actor
  - Gregory Kelly, 36, American stage actor and husband of actress Ruth Gordon, who outlived him by 58 years.

== July 10, 1927 (Sunday) ==
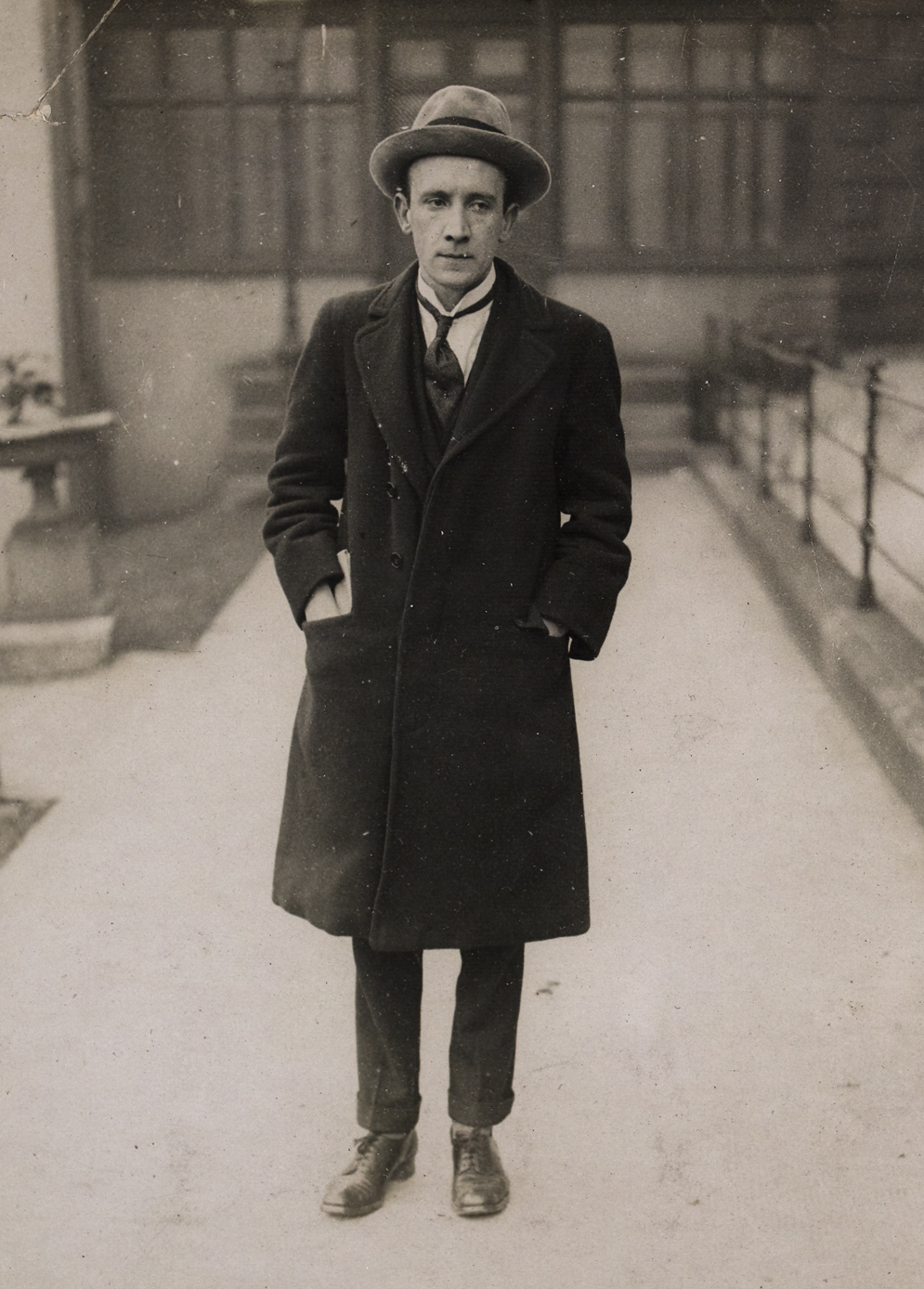
O'Higgins

- Irish Vice-President and Minister of Justice Kevin O'Higgins was assassinated while walking to mid-day Mass at Blackrock in Dublin. O'Higgins, described as "the Irish Mussolini" and "probably the most respected and at the same time the most hated man in Ireland", had given his bodyguard the day off. A car pulled up beside him and three gunmen jumped out and began firing. Reportedly, he was shot six times, but remained conscious for several hours after being taken back to his home. In response to his murder, the Irish Dail passed legislation that effectively barred the Irish Republican Army from running candidates for office.
- General José Sanjurjo declared the pacification of Spanish Morocco and the end of the Moroccan War after 18 years.
- Born: David Dinkins, first African-American mayor of New York City (1990–1993); in Trenton, New Jersey (d. 2020)

== July 11, 1927 (Monday) ==
- The very first 7-Eleven convenience store opened, on Edgefield and 12th Streets in Dallas, Texas, on 7/11/1927, with the new concept of staying open from 7:00 am to 11:00 pm.
- Striking at 2:10 in the afternoon, an earthquake in Palestine (now Israel) killed more than 200 people. Though initial reports set a higher death toll, a later report by the British Secretary of State for the Colonies put the death toll at 200 in Palestine and another eight in the neighboring Trans-Jordan (now Jordan). Hardest hit were Nablus, Ramallah and Lydda. The River Jordan dried up, and remained that way for 21 hours.
- More than a century after her death, a sealed box, owned by Joanna Southcott and said to contain her final prophecies, was opened at Westminster. Inside the container was a pistol, a nightcap, some coins and other personal belongings, but nothing mysterious.
- African-American singer and actress Ethel Waters made her Broadway debut, appearing in the production Africana.
- Born: Theodore H. Maiman, American inventor and physicist who developed the laser, patented in 1960; in Los Angeles (d. 2007)

== July 12, 1927 (Tuesday) ==
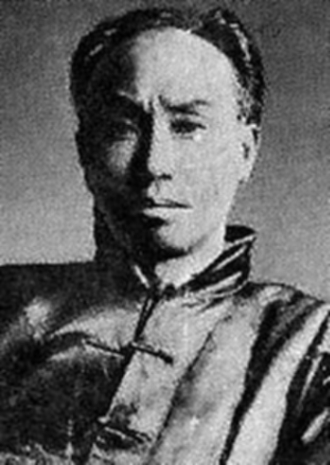
Chen

- Chen Duxiu, who had been the first General Secretary of the Chinese Communist Party, resigned from that position. In 1925, he had been succeeded as chairman by Mao Zedong.
- The convention to create the International Relief Union was adopted at the League of Nations by the 43 states in attendance, and entered into force on December 27, 1932. Intended as a unified organization for disaster relief, the I.R.U. had only limited success in assisting the International Red Cross.
- Born: Tom Benson, American entrepreneur, philanthropist, and owner of the NFL's New Orleans Saints and the NBA's New Orleans Pelicans; in New Orleans (d. 2018)

== July 13, 1927 (Wednesday) ==
- French Prime Minister Raymond Poincaré, who was also the Finance Minister, received a vote of confidence in the Chamber of Deputies and an endorsement of his call to not add further spending to the budget. Informing the legislators that "Messieurs, the whole fate of French finances rests on your decision," Poincaré won his point by a margin of 347 to 200.
- Born: Simone Veil, President of the European Parliament (1979–1982), former French Minister of Health, and survivor of the Auschwitz concentration camp during the Holocaust; as Simone Annie Liline Jacob, in Nice (d. 2017)

== July 14, 1927 (Thursday) ==
- The government of Czechoslovakia created the autonomous Slovak Province (Slovenska Krajina) in response to demands by the Slovak People's Party. (→ sk:Slovenská krajina (1928 – 1938))
- Born:
  - Peggy Parish, American author who created the Amelia Bedelia series of books; in Manning, South Carolina (d. 1988)
  - John Chancellor, American news anchorman for NBC Nightly News from 1970 to 1982, and a commentator 1982 to 1993; in Chicago (d. 1996).

== July 15, 1927 (Friday) ==
- Eighty-four protesters were killed in Vienna, and the Austrian capital's Palace of Justice (Justizpalast) was burned down, in the aftermath of a riot that followed the acquittal of three accused murderers. Vienna Police Chief Johannes Schober had ordered his men to fire into the crowd to disperse the mob.
- In Greece, the government issued decrees directed against the Macedonian minority of Slavic descent. The new rules banned use of Macedonian language and decreed that Cyrillic inscriptions were to be removed from churches.
- Born:
  - Ann Jellicoe, British playwright; in Middlesbrough, Yorkshire (d. 2017)
  - Carmen Zapata, American stage and film actress; in New York City (d. 2014)
- Died: Countess Markievicz (Constance Gore-Booth), 69, Irish politician who, in 1918, had become the first woman to be elected to the United Kingdom's House of Commons. After Ireland's independence from the United Kingdom, she was the Irish Free State's first Minister for Labour.

== July 16, 1927 (Saturday) ==
- The Battle of Ocotal began at 1:15 a.m., when several hundred Nicaraguan rebels, led by Augusto César Sandino, attacked a barracks at Ocotal, occupied by 38 U.S. Marines and 47 Nicaraguan civil guards. USMC Captain Gilbert Hatfield and his men withstood three charges. At mid-morning, rescue came from Major Ross E. Rowell, who had gotten word of the attack and led "the first dive-bombing campaign in history". At battle's end, 300 rebels and one U.S. Marine had been killed.
- Cartoonist Theodor Geisel, 23, was published for the first time under the pen name inspired by his mother's maiden name, "Seuss", in the July 16, 1927, Saturday Evening Post, effectively beginning his career as illustrator and author Dr. Seuss.
- Germany's Reichstag passed comprehensive unemployment insurance and maternity leave laws, by a margin of 356–47.

== July 17, 1927 (Sunday) ==
- In furtherance of the Turkish nationalist movement, Turkey directed the relocation of 1,400 members of the Kurdish minority from their homes in the southeast, to the far west. This was followed by deportation of Armenian and Syriac people from the same area.

== July 18, 1927 (Monday) ==
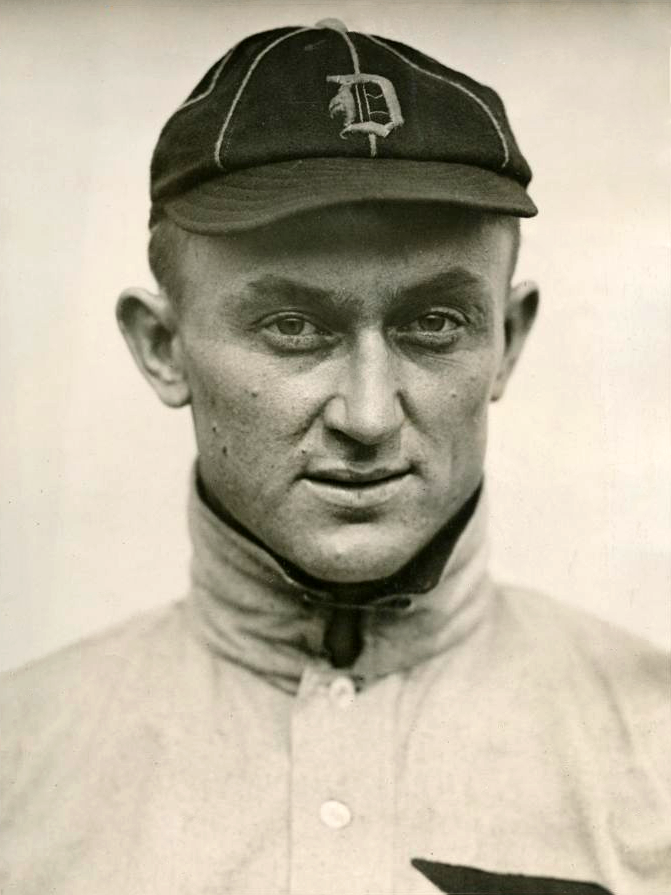
Cobb

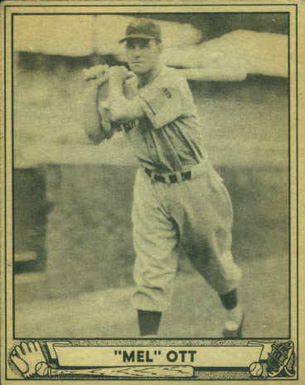
Ott

- Ty Cobb got his 4,000th hit (and would finish with 4,191) playing for the Philadelphia A's at Detroit against his former team, the Tigers. As one commentator noted fifty years later, "the event went almost unnoticed". On the same day, future Hall of Famer Mel Ott hit his first home run, an inside the park homer.
- Born: Kurt Masur, East German conductor, who later conducted the London Philharmonic Orchestra; in Brieg, Prussia (now Brzeg, Poland) (d. 2015)

== July 19, 1927 (Tuesday) ==
- Pan American Airways was awarded its first flight route, signing the contract to transport American mail between Key West and Havana. Flights began on October 19, meeting the three-month deadline called for in the agreement. "Pan Am" would grow to become one of the world's largest airlines before going bankrupt in 1991.
- Died:
  - Sheikh Amadou Bamba, 74, Senegalese Muslim religious leader and founder of the Murid Order
  - Zhao Shiyan, 26, Chinese Communist official, was executed after being captured by Nationalist forces.

== July 20, 1927 (Wednesday) ==
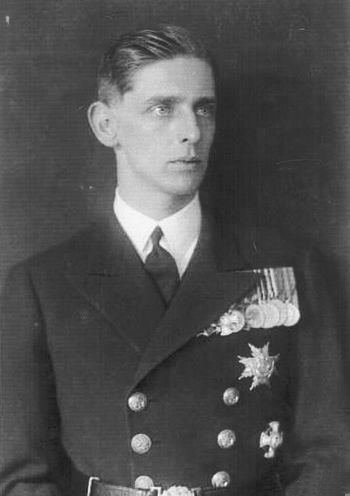
The regent, Prince Nicholas

- King Ferdinand of Romania, who had reigned since 1914, died at 2:15 am at his palace in Sinaia after a battle with cancer. At 6:00 pm, his 5-year-old grandson, was proclaimed as the new monarch, King Michael I. A regency council, headed by Prince Nicholas, was appointed to act on the boy king's behalf during his childhood.
- The French Olympic Committee, lacking funds, voted not to send a team to the 1928 games scheduled for Amsterdam. French perfume magnate François Coty would come to the team's rescue by loaning one million francs to the committee.
- Germany and Japan established closer ties by the signing of a trade treaty in Tokyo between the two nations, by Ambassador Wilhelm Solf and Japan's Prime Minister, Baron Tanaka.
- Born:
  - Leon C. Hirsch, American inventor of the Auto Suture surgical stapler, and founder of United States Surgical Corporation; in the Bronx, New York City
  - Barbara Bergmann, American economist; in the Bronx, New York City (d. 2015)
  - Lyudmila Alexeyeva, Soviet dissident and Russian human rights activist; in Yevpatoria, Crimean ASSR, Soviet Union (d. 2018)

== July 21, 1927 (Thursday) ==
- Before a crowd of 90,000 at New York's Yankee Stadium, former heavyweight boxing champion Jack Dempsey, 32, fought with Jack Sharkey to determine who would be the challenger in a September bout against champion Gene Tunney. Sharkey was winning after six rounds. As the 7th began, Dempsey struck two low body blows to Sharkey, who turned toward referee Jack O'Sullivan to complain of a foul. When Sharkey turned his head, Dempsey struck him in the jaw with a short left hook and knocked him out.
- The Ford Motor Company took steps toward the creation of Fordlândia, by spending $8,000,000 to buy 1,000,000 hectares (2,470,000 acres or 3,861 square miles) of land in Brazil's Pará State, in return for a 50-year tax exemption and full legal jurisdiction rights.
- The day after his father's death, and the proclamation of his six-year-old son as King of Romania, former Crown Prince Carol, who had renounced his right of succession two years earlier, proclaimed from his villa near Paris that he planned to claim the throne.

== July 22, 1927 (Friday) ==
- The merger of three clubs (Roman FC, SS Alba-Audace and Fortitudo-Pro Roma SGS) created the Italian soccer football team A.S. Roma, league champion in 1942, 1983 and 2001

== July 23, 1927 (Saturday) ==
- The first regular radio broadcasts in India began as the Indian Broadcasting Company went on the air in Mumbai (Bombay). A second station began operation on August 26 in Kolkata (Calcutta). The privately owned company was bought in 1930 by the publicly funded Indian Broadcasting Service, now All India Radio.
- Born: Elliot See, American astronaut who was killed in a plane crash three months before he was scheduled to have commanded the Gemini 9 mission; in Dallas (d. 1966)
- Died: Brigadier General Reginald Dyer, 62, British officer whose troops fired into a crowd of protesters, killing hundreds of unarmed civilians during the Jallianwala Bagh massacre of 1919; from a cerebral hemorrhage

== July 24, 1927 (Sunday) ==
- The Menin Gate Memorial to the Missing was dedicated in Ypres, Belgium, as a monument to nearly 90,000 soldiers of the British Empire who went missing in action in the three Battles of Ypres in World War I. The names of 54,900 soldiers who were missing in action were engraved on the available space, and another 34,888 were inscribed at a memorial at the nearby Tyne Cot cemetery. The Last Post continues to be sounded each evening at 8:00 pm at the monument.
- Died:
  - Maurice E. Crumpacker, 40, U.S. Representative for Oregon since 1925, killed himself by leaping into San Francisco Bay
  - Ryūnosuke Akutagawa, 35, Japanese short story writer, killed himself with an overdose of barbiturates

== July 25, 1927 (Monday) ==
- Centralized traffic control, now in use on railroads worldwide, was first implemented. The system for remote control of railroad signals from a central location was invented by Sedgwick N. Wight, and first used for a 40-mile stretch of the New York Central Railroad between Walbridge and Berwick, Ohio.
- July 25, 1927, is the date of the "Tanaka Memorial", purported to be a report by the Prime Minister of Japan, Baron Tanaka Giichi, to the Emperor Hirohito, summarizing a plan for world conquest that had been devised during a conference from June 27 to July 7. "The document," notes one observer, "has never been found and is generally assumed to have been a Chinese forgery, if it ever existed."

== July 26, 1927 (Tuesday) ==
- The Central Executive Committee of the Kuomintang, China's ruling Nationalist Party, passed a resolution expelling Communists from its membership and calling for the outlawing of the Chinese Communist Party.
- The Central Committee of the Chinese Communist Party met to plan what would become the Nanchang uprising; present at the meeting was V. K. Bliuker, a Soviet representative for Comintern, the Communist International organization, which was deciding whether to continue its support of Mao Zedong as the person to lead the spread of communism to China.
- French Army General Georges Catroux called a press conference to announce that the Syrian revolt by the Jabal Druze minority had been suppressed, and to deny rumors that France would give up on its responsibilities for the Mandate for Syria and the Lebanon.
- Born: Danny La Rue (stage name for Daniel Carroll), Irish-born British comedian and impressionist; in Cork (d. 2009)
- Died: June Mathis, 38, American film executive and screenwriter known for The Four Horsemen of the Apocalypse and Blood and Sand, died of a heart attack while watching a Broadway play at the 48th Street Theatre.

== July 27, 1927 (Wednesday) ==
- Soviet emissary Mikhail Borodin and 30 people left China's Wuhan province in five cars and five trucks to return to the Soviet Union in a two-month overland trip, after General Feng Yuxiang was bribed to guarantee him safe passage. The move came 12 days after Chinese Communists were expelled by Nationalist forces. Borodin had had a bounty of US$29,000 for his capture, and had hidden in the home of Nationalist official and future Chinese Premier T. V. Soong. Borodin finally returned to Moscow on October 6.
- U.S. President Calvin Coolidge and his wife, Grace Coolidge, narrowly escaped serious injury during a visit to Custer, South Dakota, after a panicked team of horses charged toward their open car, then veered away after coming within 20 feet. The horses panicked during a re-enactment of Custer's Last Stand, and charged through the crowd and out of the amphitheatre where 10,000 had assembled. Miraculously, nobody was hurt in the incident.
- Born:
  - Yuri Denisyuk, Soviet Russian physicist who helped develop the science of holography, in Sochi, Russian SFSR (d. 2006)
  - Dawid Rubinowicz, Polish victim of the Holocaust whose diaries were published, in 1960, nearly 18 years after he was murdered at the Treblinka extermination camp; in Kielce. (d. 1942)

== July 28, 1927 (Thursday) ==
- Twenty-seven people, 16 of them children, died when the excursion boat The Favorite capsized in Lake Michigan, one-half mile after departing Lincoln Park.
- Born: John Ashbery, American poet; in Rochester, New York (d. 2017). In 1976, he won the National Book Award, the National Book Critics Award and the Pulitzer Prize for his published poetry in Portrait in a Convex Mirror.

== July 29, 1927 (Friday) ==
- The Metropolitan Sergei Stragorodsky, Patriarch of the Russian Orthodox Church since 1925, issued the "Civil Fatherland Declaration", declaring that the clergy should swear allegiance to the Soviet government.
- The Trade Disputes and Trade Unions Act 1927 came into effect in the United Kingdom. The law put criminal penalties on secondary action (including "sympathy strikes").
- The State Bar of California, the largest state professional association of lawyers in the United States, was legally established to set standards for licensing and discipline among attorney, after the State Bar Act went into effect.
- Born:
  - Harry Mulisch, Dutch novelist known for The Assault (De aanslag); in Haarlem (d. 2010)
  - Horace Ward, African-American federal judge who, as a student, filed suit to challenge the segregation of the University of Georgia; in LaGrange, Georgia (d. 2016).

== July 30, 1927 (Saturday) ==
- The last flight of the U.S. Air Mail Service took place, a year after the agency had begun phasing out in favor of the Postmaster General contracting with independent carriers. The AMS had delivered mail since May 15, 1918.
- Two future Kings arrived in Quebec, along with British Prime Minister, Stanley Baldwin, to honor Canada's Diamond Jubilee. First and second in line for the throne were the Prince of Wales, who would become King Edward VIII, and the Duke of York, who would be King George VI. The party arrived at Quebec at 9:40 am on the liner RMS Empress of Australia to begin a month-long tour of the Dominion.
- Born: Victor Wong, Chinese-American character actor best known as the wise Grandpa in the 3 Ninjas film series; in San Francisco (d. 2001)

== July 31, 1927 (Sunday) ==
- The Madison suburb of Shorewood Hills, Wisconsin, was incorporated from a merger of Shorewood and College Hills.
- Died:
  - Sir Harry Johnston, 69, British explorer of Africa during the 19th century
  - Walter Travis, 65, Australian-born golfer who won the U.S. Amateur championship in 1900, 1901 and 1903 in the pre-professional era.
