= Lara avara =

Scientific classification
- Domain: Eukaryota
- Kingdom: Animalia
- Phylum: Arthropoda
- Class: Insecta
- Order: Coleoptera
- Suborder: Polyphaga
- Infraorder: Elateriformia
- Family: Elmidae
- Genus: Lara
- Species: L. avara

Binomial name
- Lara avara Leconte, 1852

Species of beetle

Lara avara is a species of riffle beetle in the family Elmidae. It is found in North America.

== Subspecies ==
These two subspecies belong to the species Lara avara:

- Lara avara amplipennis Darlington, 1929
- Lara avara avara LeConte, 1852
