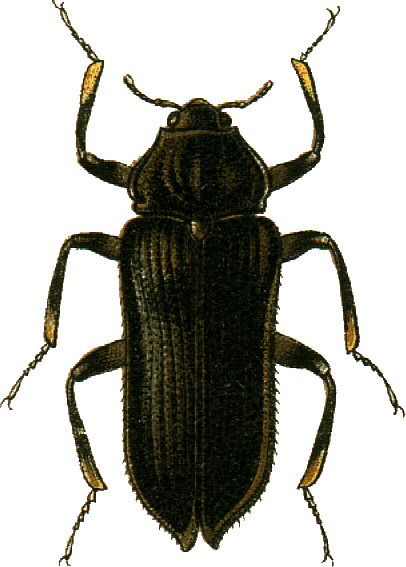

Scientific classification
- Kingdom: Animalia
- Phylum: Arthropoda
- Class: Insecta
- Order: Coleoptera
- Suborder: Polyphaga
- Infraorder: Elateriformia
- Family: Elmidae
- Subfamily: Larainae; LeConte, 1861

Tribes
- Laraini LeConte, 1861; Potamophilini Mulsant & Rey, 1872

= Larainae =

Subfamily of beetles

Larainae is a subfamily of riffle beetles in the family Elmidae. There are more than 20 genera and 160 described species in Larainae.

== Genera ==
These 28 genera belong to the subfamily Larainae:

- Disersus Sharp, 1882
- Dryopomorphus Hamilton, 1936
- Hexanchorus Sharp, 1882
- Hispaniolara Brown, 1981
- Hydora Broun, 1882
- Hydrethus Fairmaire, 1889
- Hypsilara Maier & Spangler, 2011
- Jaechomorphus Kodada, 1993
- Laorina Jäch, 1997
- Lara LeConte, 1852
- Microlara Jäch, 1993
- Neblinagena Spangler, 1985
- Omotonus Delève, 1963
- Ovolara Brown, 1981
- Parapotamophilus Brown, 1981
- Phanoceroides Hinton, 1939
- Phanocerus Sharp, 1882
- Pharceonus Spangler & Santiago-Fragoso, 1992
- Potamocares Grouvelle, 1920
- Potamodytes Grouvelle, 1896
- Potamogethes Delève, 1963
- Potamolatres Delève, 1963
- Potamophilinus Grouvelle, 1896
- Potamophilops Grouvelle, 1896
- Potamophilus Germar, 1811
- Pseudodisersus Brown, 1981
- Roraima Kodada & Jäch, 1999
- Stetholus Carter & Zeck, 1929
