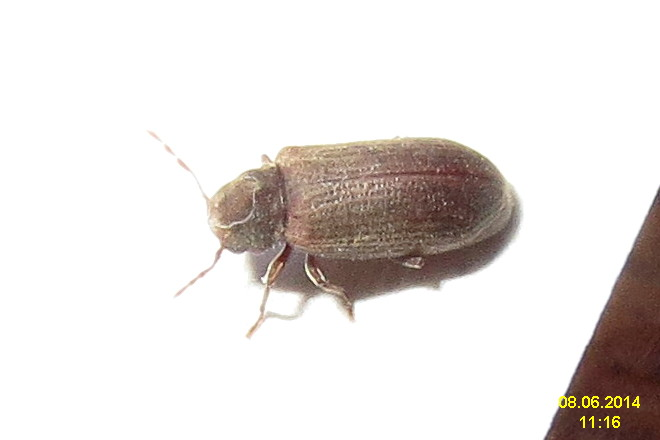
- Lara Avara(wood eating beetle)

Scientific classification
- Kingdom: Animalia
- Phylum: Arthropoda
- Class: Insecta
- Order: Coleoptera
- Suborder: Polyphaga
- Infraorder: Elateriformia
- Family: Elmidae
- Subfamily: Larainae
- Genus: Lara; LeConte, 1852

Type species
- Lara avara LeConte, 1852

Species
- 2, see text

= Lara (beetle) =

Genus of beetles

Lara is a genus of Nearctic beetles in the family Elmidae.

Name Lara was also applied to a genus of orthopterans by Otte and Alexander in 1983 (now Musgravia Otte, 1994), and to a genus of harvestmen by González-Sponga in 1987 (now Venezuelana Özdikmen, 2008).

== Species ==
There are two species, the North American wood-eating beetle Lara avara LeConte, 1852 and Lara gehringii Darlington, 1929.

== Life cycle ==
In Oregon, the life cycle of Lara avara is 4 to 6 years long, or even more. Adults can be found from May to August and live for about three weeks. They deposit the eggs on submerged wood. The larvae feed on decaying wood, absorbing substances liberated by microbial activity—they lack their own cellulase or endosymbionts.
