= June 1927 =

Month of 1927

<<	June 1927					>>
Su	Mo	Tu	We	Th	Fr	Sa
			1	2	3	4
5	6	7	8	9	10	11
12	13	14	15	16	17	18
19	20	21	22	23	24	25
26	27	28	29	30

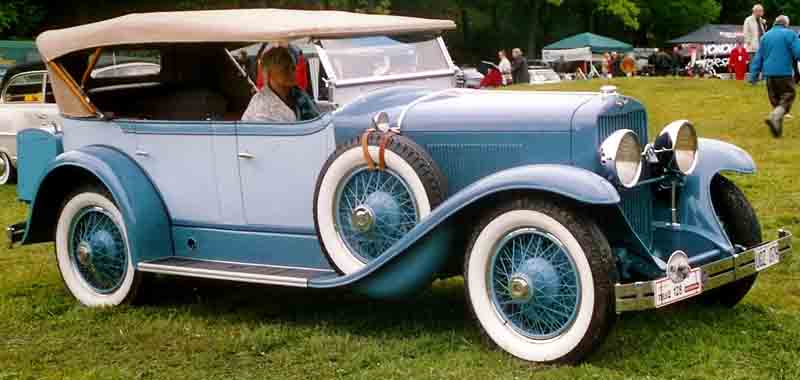
June 23, 1927: GM follows Harley Earl recommendation, introduces color to automobiles

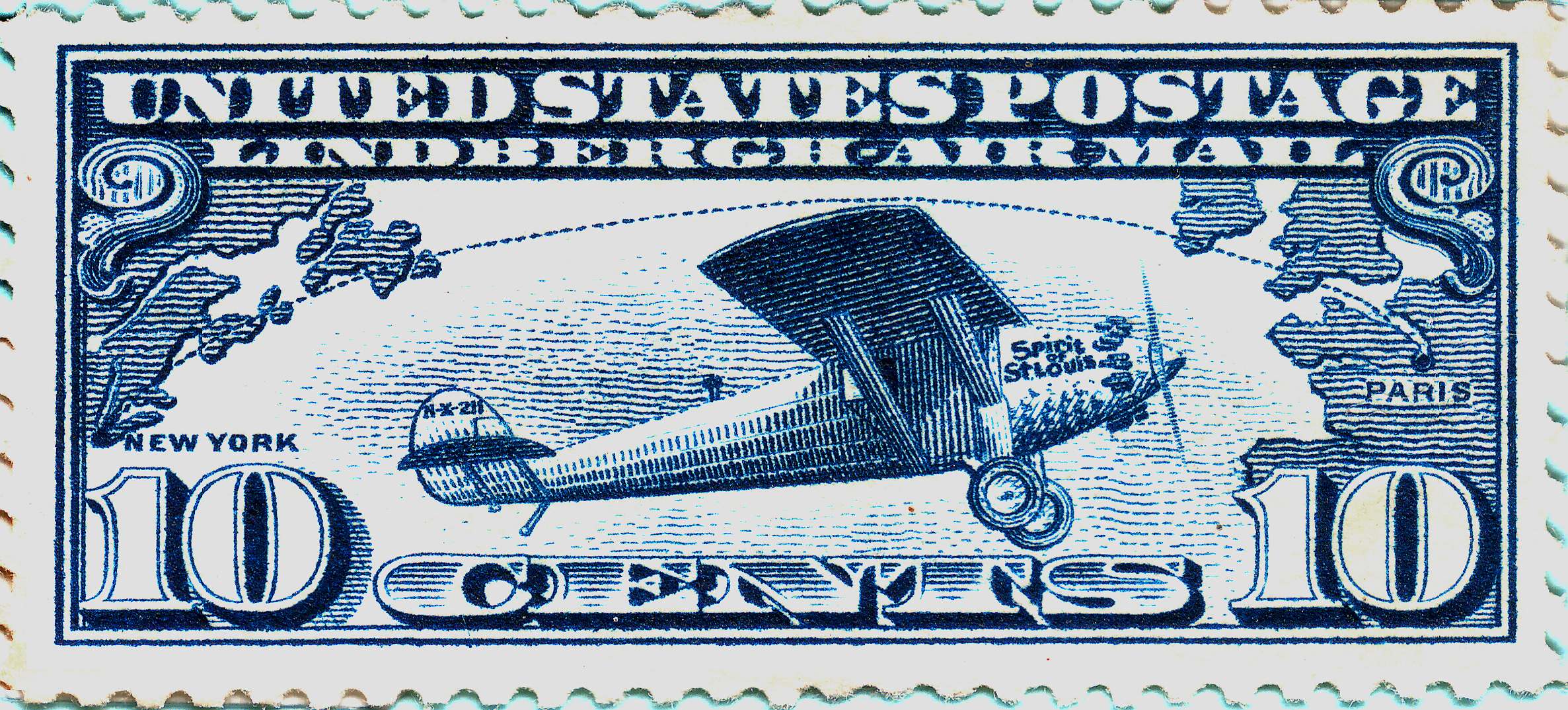
June 18, 1927: Spirit of St Louis airmail stamp issued

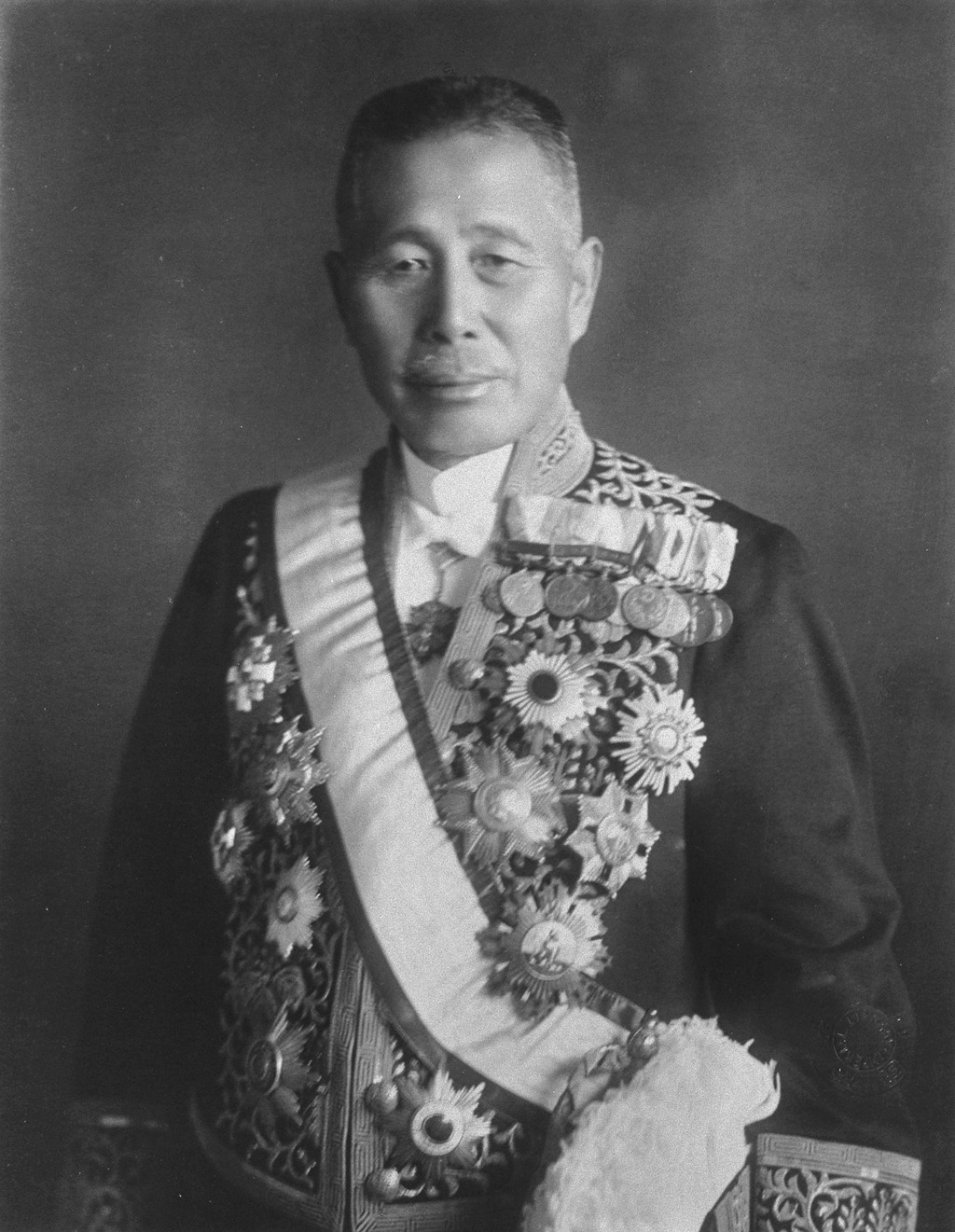
June 27, 1927: Prime Minister Tanaka plots expansion of the Japanese Empire

June 24, 1927: Fascist "Iron Guard" founded in Romania

The following events occurred in June 1927:

== June 1, 1927 (Wednesday) ==
- Liquor sales began again in the province of Ontario for the first time since 1916. Visitors from the United States, where alcohol sales had been banned nationwide since 1920, were allowed to purchase up to two cases apiece of whiskey, wine and beer, no more often than once a month, and only if they were issued a non-citizen permit, which required three days stay in Canada.
- Radio frequencies assigned by the Federal Radio Commission, effective June 15, for 694 American radio stations. All stations in the U.S. were required to begin broadcasting on their assigned AM radio frequency no later than 3:00 a.m. Eastern time on the 15th, or have their licenses taken. Federal Radio Commission's new frequency allocations take effect at 3:00 am Eastern time
- World lightweight boxing champion Sammy Mandell and challenger Steve Adams (real name Steven Adamczyk) met in an exhibition bout in Kansas City. In the second round, Adams jumped back from a blow and struck his head on the top rope of the ring, fell unconscious, and was counted out. Minutes later, he was pronounced dead.
- Died:
  - Lizzie Borden, 66, who was acquitted in the 1892 ax murders of her parents
  - J. B. Bury, 65, Irish historian

== June 2, 1927 (Thursday) ==
- The Aviation Corporation of America was founded by Juan Trippe, with the backing of Cornelius Vanderbilt Whitney and W. Averell Harriman, and raised $250,000 in startup capital from the sale of stock to launch the first major airline, Pan American World Airways.
- Died: Wang Guowei, 49, Chinese poet, by suicide

== June 3, 1927 (Friday) ==
- The creation of a chain of 600 vaudeville and movie theatres, largest in the United States, was announced with a $250 million merger of companies into the Keith-Albee-Orpheum Corporation.
- Born: Boots Randolph (stage name for Homer Louis Randolph III), American saxophone player, in Paducah, Kentucky (d. 2007)
- Died: Einar Hanson, 29, Swedish film actor and co-star of Pola Negri; in a car accident near Santa Monica, California.

== June 4, 1927 (Saturday) ==
- The Indonesian National Party (Partai Nasional Indonesia or PNI) was founded by Sukarno (Kusno Sosrodihardjo) and Mohammad Hatta, and guided the Dutch East Indies to independence from the Netherlands by 1945, when Sukarno and Hatta became the first President and Vice-President of Indonesia.
- Charles Lindbergh and his airplane, the Spirit of St. Louis, began their trip back to the United States from France, as passenger and cargo on the USS Memphis (CL-13). Lindbergh flew from Paris to Cherbourg, where a launch took him to the Memphis.
- General Alexandru Averescu was removed as Prime Minister of Romania by King Ferdinand, who replaced him with Barbu Ştirbey.
- From the U.S. presidential yacht Mayflower, stationed off Cape Henry, Virginia, President Coolidge watched the most elaborate naval review in the nation's history. In all, 98 aircraft carriers, battleships, destroyers, submarines and other U.S. Navy vessels sailed past the Commander in Chief. Unidentified sources in the Navy later claimed that Coolidge had watched only 20 minutes of the procession, wore only casual clothes, and been indifferent to the honor.
- The horror film The Unknown starring Lon Chaney and Joan Crawford was released.
- Died: Robert McKim, 49, American silent film actor and vaudevillian, three weeks after he suffered a cerebral hemorrhage on stage while performing at a vaudeville show.

== June 5, 1927 (Sunday) ==
- Arthur Barry, the most successful gentleman thief in history, was arrested at the train station in Ronkonkoma, New York, bringing to an end a career in which he stole more than five million dollars' worth of jewelry from the homes of wealthy victims. Barry, who used the alias Arthur Gibson, escaped prison in 1929 and was recaptured in 1932, then released in 1949.
- Torino F.C. bribed opposing defender Luigi Allemandi of Juventus FC prior to a match and was later stripped of its title for the 1926-27 season.

== June 6, 1927 (Monday) ==
- Clarence D. Chamberlin and Charles A. Levine became the second people to fly an airplane across the Atlantic Ocean from North America, to Europe, landing the Columbia at Eisleben, in Germany, after a nonstop flight of 3,905 miles (6,284 km) in 44 hours and 35 minutes. The duo had planned to reach Berlin but were forced to land 100 miles (160 km) short of their goal by a damaged propeller.
- Article 58 of the Russian Penal Code was amended to expand the number of "anti-Soviet" crimes, including "aid to social groups that are under the influence of that part of the international bourgeoisie that does not recognize the equality of rights of the Communist system", making statements in favor of "weakening" Soviet power, or possessing subversive literature. Failure to report a counter-revolutionary crime could be punishable by up to ten years in prison.

== June 7, 1927 (Tuesday) ==
- Alvin "Shipwreck" Kelly climbed up the 50-foot (15 m) tall flagpole at the St. Francis Hotel in Newark, New Jersey, at 10:00 am, set a stool on the sphere at the top, and announced that he would remain there for at least eight days. Kelly, who had trained with a 7-day stunt in St. Louis in January, told reporters that the point of the stunt was to prove to the American public that it "overdoes things- especially eating", and that he would be in better physical shape after he came down than when he went up. Kelly remained at his perch for 12 days and 12 hours, coming down on June 19.
- Pyotr Voykov, Soviet ambassador to Poland, was assassinated at the railway station in Warsaw. He was shot by 19-year-old Boris Kowerda, an exiled Russian youth, in retaliation for having signed the death warrants in 1918 for Tsar Nicholas II and the Russian Imperial Family.

== June 8, 1927 (Wednesday) ==
- Canada sent a note of protest to U.S. Secretary of State Frank B. Kellogg concerning a decision to require all Canadians, working in the U.S., to obtain immigrant visas by December 1. Thousands of Canadians had, for years, commuted to jobs in the United States every day, but border restrictions were made in response to the legalization of liquor sales in Canada, which were still prohibited in the U.S.
- American theatrical producer Earl Carroll began a prison sentence of one year and one day as inmate number 24,909 in the federal prison in Atlanta, after being convicted of perjury. Carroll had created a national scandal when he had thrown a party on Washington's Birthday in 1926, featuring a nude model in a bathtub of champagne, then lied about it.
- Born: Jerry Stiller, American comedian, in New York City (d. 2020)

== June 9, 1927 (Thursday) ==
- In elections in Ireland, W. T. Cosgrave retained his post as Prime Minister of the Irish Free State. His Cumann na nGaedheal Party won 47 seats in Dáil Éireann, while Fianna Fáil, led by Éamon de Valera, received 44.
- A forerunner of the musical synthesizer, the "Clavier à Lampes", was demonstrated by its inventor, Armand Givelet, at the Trocadero Theatre in Philadelphia.
- Died: Victoria Woodhull, 88, American leader of the campaign to give women the right to vote, and the first woman to run for U.S. President (1872)

== June 10, 1927 (Friday) ==
- Printing of Nan Britton's controversial book, The President's Daughter, was halted by New York City police, following a complaint by the Society for the Suppression of Vice. The police were forced to release confiscated books and printing plates on June 29, and the book, in which Britton claimed that she and the late President Warren G. Harding had had an affair, was published in 1928.

== June 11, 1927 (Saturday) ==
- Following a week-long voyage from France, the U.S.S. Memphis sailed up the Potomac River to return Charles Lindbergh and his plane to the United States, three weeks after his May 20 departure by airplane. "Lucky Lindy" received an enthusiastic welcome in Washington, D.C., and was honored by the President and Mrs. Coolidge, before setting off the next day by train to New York City. He became the first person to be awarded the Distinguished Flying Cross, a medal which had been created on July 2, 1926.

== June 12, 1927 (Sunday) ==
- The body of the last victim of American serial killer Earle Nelson was discovered in a rooming house in Winnipeg. Dubbed "The Gorilla Murderer" by the American press, Nelson killed at least 22 women in the U.S. over a period of a year and a half, then murdered a boardinghouse operator and a 14-year-old girl after coming to Canada. Arrested on June 15 in Manitoba, he was convicted of the murder of Emily Patterson, and hanged on January 13, 1928.
- The threat of war between Yugoslavia and Albania, with Italy taking Albania's side, was eased at a meeting in Geneva of the Council of Foreign Ministers at the League of Nations. Earlier in the month, Yugoslavia had severed diplomatic relations after the arrest of an embassy employee in Tirana.
- Guglielmo Marconi, the inventor of wireless radio and Italy's most celebrated living scientist, married the Countess Maria Christina Bezzi-Scali in Rome. The couple received full military honors and the ceremony was attended by dictator Benito Mussolini.

== June 13, 1927 (Monday) ==
- A ticker-tape parade was held for aviator Charles Lindbergh down Fifth Avenue in New York City. An estimated 4,500,000 people turned out to watch, and millions more heard the events described in a live radio broadcast.
- Born: Slim Dusty (stage name for David Gordon Kilpatrick), Australian country singer-songwriter; in Sydney (d. 2003)

== June 14, 1927 (Tuesday) ==
- Reinhold Glière's The Red Poppy received its first performance. Premiering in Moscow, it was the first Communist-themed ballet.
- Died: Jerome K. Jerome, 68, English humorist

== June 15, 1927 (Wednesday) ==
- President Coolidge, his wife, and his top aides arrived in Rapid City, South Dakota, two days after leaving Washington, D.C., then traveled 32 miles (51 km) to the 40-room state game lodge. For nearly three months, the President took an extended summer vacation and governed from the state park in the Black Hills, before returning to the White House on September 11.

== June 16, 1927 (Thursday) ==
- Charles Lindbergh collected the $25,000 Orteig Prize, as the first person to fly an airplane between New York City and Paris. Raymond Orteig handed him the award at the Hotel Brevoort. On the same day, Lindbergh also became the first person to receive the American Distinguished Flying Cross (authorized July 2, 1926).

== June 17, 1927 (Friday) ==
- American occupation troops began their withdrawal from Nicaragua, with a small contingent group of a contingent of U.S. Marines sailing from Corinto.
- Born: Wallace Wood, American comic artist, in Menahga, Minnesota (d. 1981)
- Died: John R. Thompson, 62, founder of one of the first fast food restaurant chains in the United States. Thompson built on the concept of the cafeteria, catering to business people in large cities. At the time of his death, there were 120 Thompson's Restaurants in 42 states.

== June 18, 1927 (Saturday) ==
- Marshal Zhang Zuolin began a military dictatorship in northeast China, with Beijing as his capital, and vowed to purge the entire nation of Communists led by Mao Zedong and Nationalists led by Chiang Kai-shek.
- The first of 15 million U.S. air mail stamps, printed with a picture of the Spirit of St. Louis in honor of Lindbergh's flight to Paris, went on sale and were sought after by collectors. The 10¢ stamps went on sale in St. Louis, Detroit, Washington, and Lindbergh's boyhood hometown of Little Falls, Minnesota.
- The first race took place on the newly-completed Nürburgring in Germany, on 350cc motorcycles. Toni Ulmen won the race.
- Born: Paul Eddington, British actor, in London (d. 1995)

== June 19, 1927 (Sunday) ==
- Plans were announced for the merger of the Great Northern Railway and the Northern Pacific Railway, the two largest carriers in the northwestern United States, with lines in Seattle and Minneapolis. The Interstate Commerce Commission eventually (1931) rejected the proposal to create the "Great Northern Pacific Railway Company". A larger merger would finally take place in 1970, with the two companies and others joining as the Burlington Northern Railroad. As of 1996, the two former systems are now part of the BNSF Railway.

== June 20, 1927 (Monday) ==
- The Geneva Naval Conference opened with representatives of the United States, the United Kingdom and Japan discussing further limitations on the building of warships, including a prohibition against submarines. The Conference was a failure, adjourning on August 24 with no agreement.
- Aristide Briand, former Premier of France, visited the U.S. Embassy in Paris and presented his proposed treaty to outlaw war. The Kellogg–Briand Pact would be signed in 1928 by many of the world's superpowers.
- Born: Pauline Newman, U.S. Circuit Judge of the Court of Appeals for the Federal Circuit, in New York City
- Died: William Frederick Collings, 74, feudal ruler of the British island of Sark since 1882. He was succeeded as ruler by his 33-year-old daughter, Dame Sibyl Hathaway.

== June 21, 1927 (Tuesday) ==
- In an incident of antisemitism that shocked the United States, three Jewish physicians, interning at the Kings County Hospital Center in Brooklyn, were grabbed from their beds, bound and gagged, dunked in ice cold water, and threatened with reprisals if they did not quit the traditionally "Christian" institution. The perpetrators turned out to be other doctors, a group of twenty other interns. The victims pressed charges, and six of the attackers were expelled.
- Born: Carl Stokes, first African-American mayor of a major U.S. city politician, in Cleveland, where he was mayor 1968-1971 (d. 1996)

== June 22, 1927 (Wednesday) ==
- The South Dakota state legislature, meeting in special session, voted unanimously to rename Lookout Mountain, elevation 5,971 feet (1,820 m), in honor of the President, who had moved to the state for the summer. Mount Coolidge overlooks what is now Custer State Park.

== June 23, 1927 (Thursday) ==
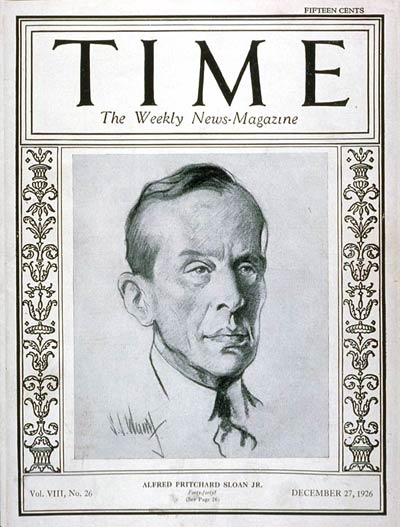
Sloan

- General Motors CEO Alfred P. Sloan changed automotive history by creating the "Art and Color Section" for the design of all GM automobiles, with Harley Earl to plan vehicles that would be visually appealing.
- A grand jury in Los Angeles issued an indictment of 55 persons associated with the Julian Petroleum Company, on charges of conspiracy to swindle investors of millions of dollars. Sales of worthless stock had been halted on May 6.
- The Cleanliness Institute, with a mission of increasing sales of personal care products through education and press releases, was founded in New York City by Sidney M. Colgate, president of the Association of American Soap and Glycerine Producers. "The institute was short-lived," an observer noted 80 years later, "but helped give birth to the shelves of deodorants, soaps, shampoos, toothpastes, mouthwashes, teeth-whiteners, douches and antibacterial lotions that fill our pharmacy shelves today."
- Born: Bob Fosse, American choreographer and director, winner of 8 Tony Awards; in Chicago (d. 1987)

== June 24, 1927 (Friday) ==
- The Iron Guard (Garda de fier), a fascist organization known officially as the Legion of the Archangel Michael (Legiunea Arhanghelul Mihail), was founded in Romania by Corneliu Codreanu.
- Born: Martin Lewis Perl, American physicist and 1995 Nobel Prize in Physics laureate for discovery of the tau lepton; in New York City (d. 2014)

== June 25, 1927 (Saturday) ==
- Léon Daudet, the jailed French monarchist leader and editor of L'Action française, strolled out of La Santé Prison after the warden was tricked by a phone call. Shortly after noon, prison governor Haute took the call and was told, "This is the Minister of the Interior speaking. You are to release Leon Daudet immediately... the President of the Republic has reprieved him." Haute called the Ministry for confirmation and was answered by another plotter, who claimed to be the Minister's secretary. Released also were L'Action francaise manager Joseph Delest, and French Communist Party leader Pierre Semard, who were all personally escorted out the front gate by Haute. Daudet went into exile in Belgium until he was pardoned in 1929.
- The drama film The Way of All Flesh starring Emil Jannings premiered in New York City.
- Died: Daniel D. Luckenbill, 46, Professor of Assyriology and author of the first volume of Ancient Records of Assyria and Babylonia, translated by him from cuneiform records.

== June 26, 1927 (Sunday) ==
- The Pons–Winnecke Comet passed within 0.04 AU (3.7 million miles or 6 million kilometers) of Earth, making the closest approach of any comet in the 20th century, and the closest since Lexell's Comet on July 1, 1770.
- The Cyclone, at the time the world's largest and fastest roller coaster, opened at New York's Coney Island. Refurbished in 1975, the Cyclone continues to operate.

== June 27, 1927 (Monday) ==
- Led by Prime Minister Tanaka Giichi, the "Far Eastern Conference" was convened in Tokyo. Over a period of ten days, Japan's military and political leaders discussed long range strategy for the conquest of China, and possibly the world. A report was made to the Emperor following the conference, and in 1929, the "Tanaka Memorial", purporting to be a leaked copy of the secret document, was published. The Tanaka Memorial, whose authenticity has been questioned, described plans for Japanese control of the Pacific Ocean, including conquest of the western United States, Australia and New Zealand.
- Born: Bob Keeshan, American children's television show host who portrayed "Captain Kangaroo" from 1955 to 1984; in Lynbrook, New York (d. 2004)

== June 28, 1927 (Tuesday) ==
- Lieutenants Lester J. Maitland and Albert F. Hegenberger took off from Oakland at 7:10 a.m. toward Honolulu in a race to become the first to fly from the U.S. mainland to Hawaii. Ernest L. Smith set off at 9:38 am to catch them, but he had to return due to a defective lid on the cockpit.
- Campañía Arrendataria del Monopolio de Petroleós (CAMPSA), as predecessor of petrochemicals and energy brand, Repsol was founded in Spain.
- Born:
  - Frank Sherwood Rowland, American chemist, one of three who discovered the threat to the ozone layer from CFCs; 1995 Nobel Prize in Chemistry laureate; in Delaware, Ohio (d. 2012)
  - Ann Aldrich, U.S. District Judge from 1980 to 2010 (d. 2010)

== June 29, 1927 (Wednesday) ==
- A total eclipse of the Sun took place with the Moon's shadow covering the United Kingdom shortly after sunrise. As a contemporary account noted, "This is the first total eclipse of the sun that has visited Great Britain since 1724 and it will be the last seen here until 1999".
- Pilots Maitland and Hegneberger completed their trans-Pacific journey at 6:31 am local time, landing at Wheeler Army Airfield in Honolulu.
- Filming of the MGM motion picture The Trail of '98 was marred by the deaths of stuntman Ray Thompson, and actors Joseph Bautin and F.H. Daughters. The three were filming a scene on the rapids of the Copper River in Alaska. On the same day, actress Ethel Hall was killed on the Merced River during the filming of the silent western Tumbling River, starring Tom Mix and Dorothy Dwan (for whom Miss Hall was standing in).
- In a major turning point in his spiritual and literary life, author T. S. Eliot was baptized into the Church of England.
- The city of Laguna Beach, California, was incorporated.

== June 30, 1927 (Thursday) ==
- Blood was drawn from a yellow fever sufferer in the West African colony of the Gold Coast (now Ghana), then used for research by Dr. Adrian Stokes and Dr. A.H. Mahaffy. The blood sample, given by a 28-year-old man named Asibi, led to the isolation and discovery of the virus that transmits the disease.
- Boeing Air Transport, a predecessor to United Airlines, was founded with William Boeing as chairman of the board, Philip G. Johnson as president, and Claire Egtvedt as its chief aircraft engineer and designer.
- Walter Heitler and Fritz London submitted their paper, "Wechselwirkung neutraler Atome und homöopolare Bindung nach der Quantenmechanik", for publication in Zeitschrift für Physik, an event described as "the birthday of quantum chemistry".
