= Francis Marion Snow =

American murderer (1881–1927)

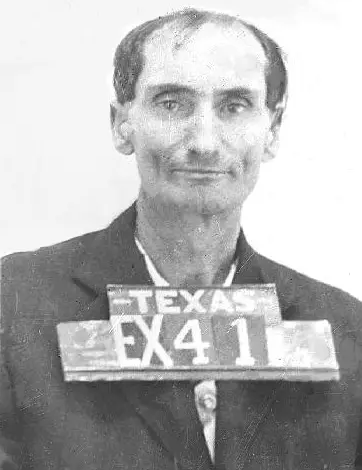
- Born: June 6, 1881; Texas, U.S.
- Died: August 12, 1927 (aged 46); Huntsville Unit, Texas, U.S.
- Other names: The Butcher of Stephenville; Old Man Snow
- Status: Executed by electrocution
- Conviction: Murder with malice
- Penalty: Death

Details
- Victims: 3-7
- Date: November 12, 1925
- Weapons: Wooden club Axe; Winchester rifle

Francis Marion Snow (June 6, 1881 – August 12, 1927), also known as the Butcher of Stephenville, was an American triple murderer and family annihilator who murdered his wife, mother-in-law, and step-son on November 27, 1925, near Selden, Texas, after an argument. He was convicted of these murders and executed on August 12, 1927. Snow is also suspected of committing several other murders.

== Murders ==
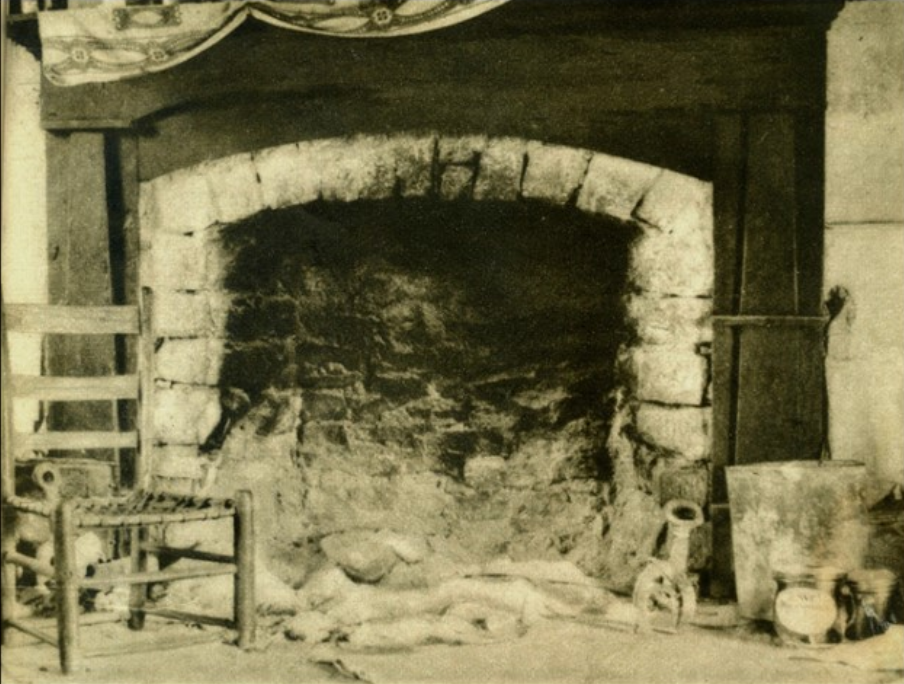
The fireplace where Maggie Snow and Samantha Ann Old's bodies were burned.

On November 27, 1925, a 44-year-old Francis Snow had an argument with his wife, Maggie Snow, after she let livestock loose in the cotton patch. Snow became enraged, and bludgeoned her to death with a wooden club. Snow then murdered his mother-in-law, Samantha Olds, with an axe. Olds, who was 74, was unaware that she was in any danger because she was blind and deaf. Snow then hid the bodies, and rode on horse and buggy to find his stepson, 19-year-old Bernard Connally. Earlier in the day, Connally took a load of wood into a more urban area of Stephenville, and hadn't returned home yet. After he found Connally, Snow told him that his mother was sick, and wanted Connally to return home. (Note: Other records of the event state that Bernie Connally was present during the argument, and killed by Snow because he agreed with his mother.) After arriving at the farm, Snow shot Connally twice in the back with a Winchester rifle, killing him.

After murdering his three family members, Snow cut up the bodies of Maggie Snow and Samantha Ann Olds with an axe, and burned them in his fireplace. Snow then stripped all the clothes from Bernard Connally's body except for his underwear. He took his stepson's remains to Cedar Point, where he decapitated the body with his axe. Later in the evening, Snow put the severed head in a sack, and left it in the cellar of an abandoned farmhouse in Erath County.

== Discovery of remains ==
Jesse Elvis Riggs, a young fur trapper, discovered the head of Bernard Connally on December 9, 1925. Riggs, along with an acquaintance, Ben Aycock, and his dog Butch, (Note: The dog is often miscredited with the discovery of the head.) went to his grandfather's farm to set traps. Aycock set traps outside of an abandoned house on the farm, while Jesse Riggs went inside to set traps. When he reached the basement of the house, he noticed the bloody sack containing the head. Riggers alerted Aycock about the sack, and he went into the cellar to inspect it. Then, Aycock opened the bag and found the head.

The two men then drove away in their car and alerted the police.

== Investigation ==
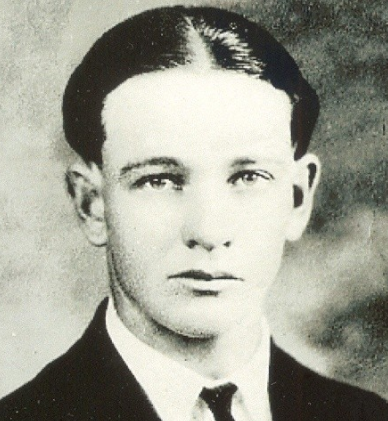
Bernard D. "Bernie" Connally

After arriving at the cellar, investigators quickly determined that the murder did not happen at the farmhouse due to the lack of blood at the crime scene. They also determined that the decapitation wasn't the cause of death. The authorities theorized that the death may have resulted from the knife wound found under the chin, or from a bludgeoning. The police also realized that the murderer was likely familiar with the area, because there were three other abandoned homes nearby, but the one the murderer hid the severed head in was the only one with a basement.

The investigators could not identify the head, so they put it on display at a local morgue in the hopes that someone would recognize it. An estimated 6,000 to 7,000 people viewed the head, nicknamed "the pretty boy" before it was identified as Bernard Connally by a woman named Ida Gristy.

After the identification of the head, Francis Marion Snow was questioned at his home by Sheriff David Medicus Hassler. Snow claimed that Maggie Snow, Samantha Olds, and Bernard Connally left home to visit Waco, Texas on November 27. However, Snow soon became a suspect in the murders after Sheriff Hassler and Stewart Stanley, a Texas ranger, noticed inconsistencies in Snow's story, so he was taken into custody for additional questioning. In order to prevent locals from lynching him, Snow was kept in the Tarrant County jail in Fort Worth for his own protection.

Authorities quickly secured a search warrant to investigate Snow's farm. In his wagon, they discovered dry blood and the Winchester rifle used to kill Bernard Connally. In the fireplace, they found the ashes and bone fragments of Maggie Snow and Samantha Olds. They also found an axe with dry blood on it.

Francis Snow confessed to the murder of Bernard Connally on December 11, 1925. Accompanied by the sheriff, the deputy, two rangers, district attorney Samuel Morris Russell, and officers of Fort Worth, Snow walked to where the rest of his stepson's remains were, sixteen miles away from where the head was found. While standing over the body, Snow also confessed to the murders of his wife and mother-in-law.

== Legal proceedings and execution ==
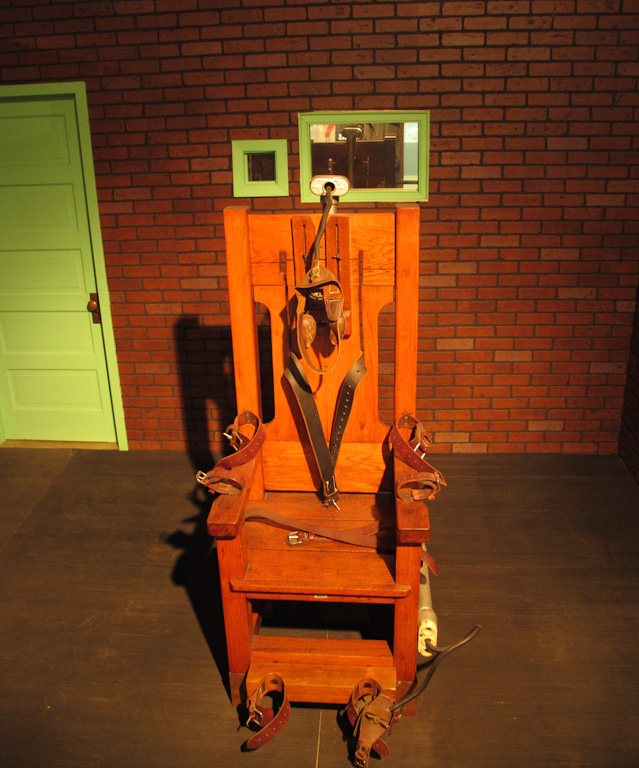
The electric chair Snow was executed in.

Francis M. Snow's trial, The State of Texas vs. F.M Snow, started on January 18, 1926. The defense attempted to use an insanity defense, but it was quickly rejected. The most damning evidence in the trial was Snow's written confession, which he signed in front of multiple witnesses. On December 27, 1926, the jury briefly deliberated before returning a guilty verdict. Snow was sentenced to death. He then tried to file an appeal, which was denied, and he was then taken to the Huntsville Unit in Huntsville, Texas.

While in prison, Snow confessed to murdering several more people, including Gene Graves, another inmate who taunted Snow in prison. He also confessed to murdering a man in Palo Pinto county, and another man in San Saba county. Snow was also suspected of decapitating and murdering someone in Mineral Wells in 1912, but he refused to comment further on that murder.

=== Execution ===
Francis Marion Snow was executed by electric chair on August 12, 1927, in Huntsville, Texas. His last words, which he said while strapped to the electric chair, were "there's never been a better man sit in this thing." He is buried at Captain Joe Byrd Cemetery.

== In media ==
=== Literature ===
- Pylant, James (2008). Blood Legacy: The True Story of the Snow Axe Murders. Jacobus Books. ISBN 9780962274695

=== Music ===
- Musical artist Milton Brown wrote a song about Francis Marion Snow in 1926, titled, "Old Man Snow."
