= Harley Brown =

American entomologist

Harley Procter Brown Jr. (January 13, 1921 – June 6, 2008) was an American biologist and an expert in certain types of aquatic beetles. He described over forty new species in his career.

== Background and education ==
He was born in Uniontown, Alabama and showed an early interest in insects. He received undergraduate and graduate degrees (1942) from Miami University in Oxford, Ohio. His thesis involved the lifecycle of the species Climacia areolaris of the family Sisyridae. He received a PhD from Ohio State University in Columbus, Ohio in 1945. His dissertation studied the flagellum of the protozoan with the electron microscope.

== Academic career ==
Brown taught at the following institutions:

- University of Idaho (Moscow), 1945–1947
- Oregon Institute of Marine Biology (Charleston), 1946
- Queens College (Flushing, New York), 1947–1948
- University of Oklahoma (Norman), 1948–1984

== Taxa described by Brown ==
Taxa described by Brown include:

- Dryopidae
  - Elmoparnus mexicanus (1970)
- Elmidae
  - Austrelmis (1984)
  - Elsianus shoemakei (1971); synonym of Macrelmis by Motschulsky (1860)
  - Heterelmis comalensis (1988); with Bosse & Tuff
  - Heterelmis stephani (1972)
  - Hispaniolara 1981 (1981)
  - Hispaniolara farri (1981)
  - Huleechius (1981)
  - Huleechius carolus (1981)
  - Huleechius marroni (1981)
  - Hydora annectens (1981); with Spangle
  - Hydora lenta (1981); with Spangle
  - Leptelmis philomina (1984); with Thobias
  - Neocylloepus arringtoni (1970)
  - Neocylloepus boeseli (1970)
  - Neocylloepus (1970)
  - Neocylloepus hintoni (1970)
  - Neocylloepus petersoni (1970)
  - Neocylloepus sandersoni (1970)
  - Ovolara (1981)
  - Parapotamophilus (1981)
  - Parapotamophilus gressitti (1981)
  - Pseudodisersus (1981)
  - Pseudodisersus coquereli (1981); synonym of P. goudotii by Guérin-Méneville (1843)
  - Stenelmis cheryl (1987)
  - Stenelmis gammoni (1976); with White
  - Stenelmis lignicola (1992); with Schmude
  - Stenelmis occidentalis (1991); with Schmude
  - Suzevia (1992); subgenus of Zaitzevia by Champion (1923)
  - Xenelmis sandersoni (1985)
  - Zaitzevia posthonia (1985)
- Lutrochidae
  - Lutrochus arizonicus (1970); with Murvosh
- Psephenidae
  - Alabameubria (1980); synonym of Dicranopselaphus by Guérin-Méneville (1861)
  - Alabameubria starki (1980); synonym of Dicranopselaphus variegatus by Horn (1880)
  - Mataeopsephus taiwanicus (1990); with Lee & Yang
  - Psephenus arizonensis (1974); with Murvosh
  - Psephenus montanus (1974); with Murvosh
  - Psephenus murvoshi (1970)
  - Psephenus texanus (1967); with Arrington
  - Schinostethus flabellatus (1993) with Lee & Yang
  - Schinostethus junghuaensis (1993) with Lee & Yang; synonym of S. satoi by Lee, Yang & Brown (1993)
  - Schinostethus minutus (1993); with Lee & Yang
  - Schinostethus niger (1993); with Lee & Yang
  - Schinostethus satoi (1993); with Lee & Yang

== Taxa named in honor of Brown (Patronyms) ==
Taxa named in honor of Brown include:

- Elmidae
  - Austrolimnius browni
  - Dubiraphia browni
  - Dubiraphia harleyi
  - Hexanchorus browni
  - Optioservus browni
  - Macrelmis browni
- Hydraenidae
  - Hydraena browni
  - Ochthebius browni
- Limnichidae
  - Limnichites browni
- Psephenidae
  - Psephenopalpus browni

== Publications ==
=== Papers ===
Brown authored and co-authored dozens of scientific papers from 1941 to 2001.

=== Books ===
- Aquatic Dryopoid Beetles (Coleoptera) Of The United States [Biota of Freshwater Ecosystems Identification Manual No. 6] (1972)
- A catalog of the Coleoptera of America north of Mexico: Family : Dryopidae (Agriculture handbook) (1983)
