= S. concinna =

S. concinna may refer to:

- Schinia concinna, a North American moth
- Schismatoglottis concinna, a flowering plant
- Schizura concinna, a North American moth
- Scissurella concinna, a sea snail
- Sepsis concinna, an ant-mimicking fly
- Sigara concinna, a water boatman
- Siphonalia concinna, a sea snail
- Stenelmis concinna, a rifle beetle
- Stratiomys concinna, a soldier fly
- Swainsona concinna, a flowering plant
- Synaptocochlea concinna, a sea snail
