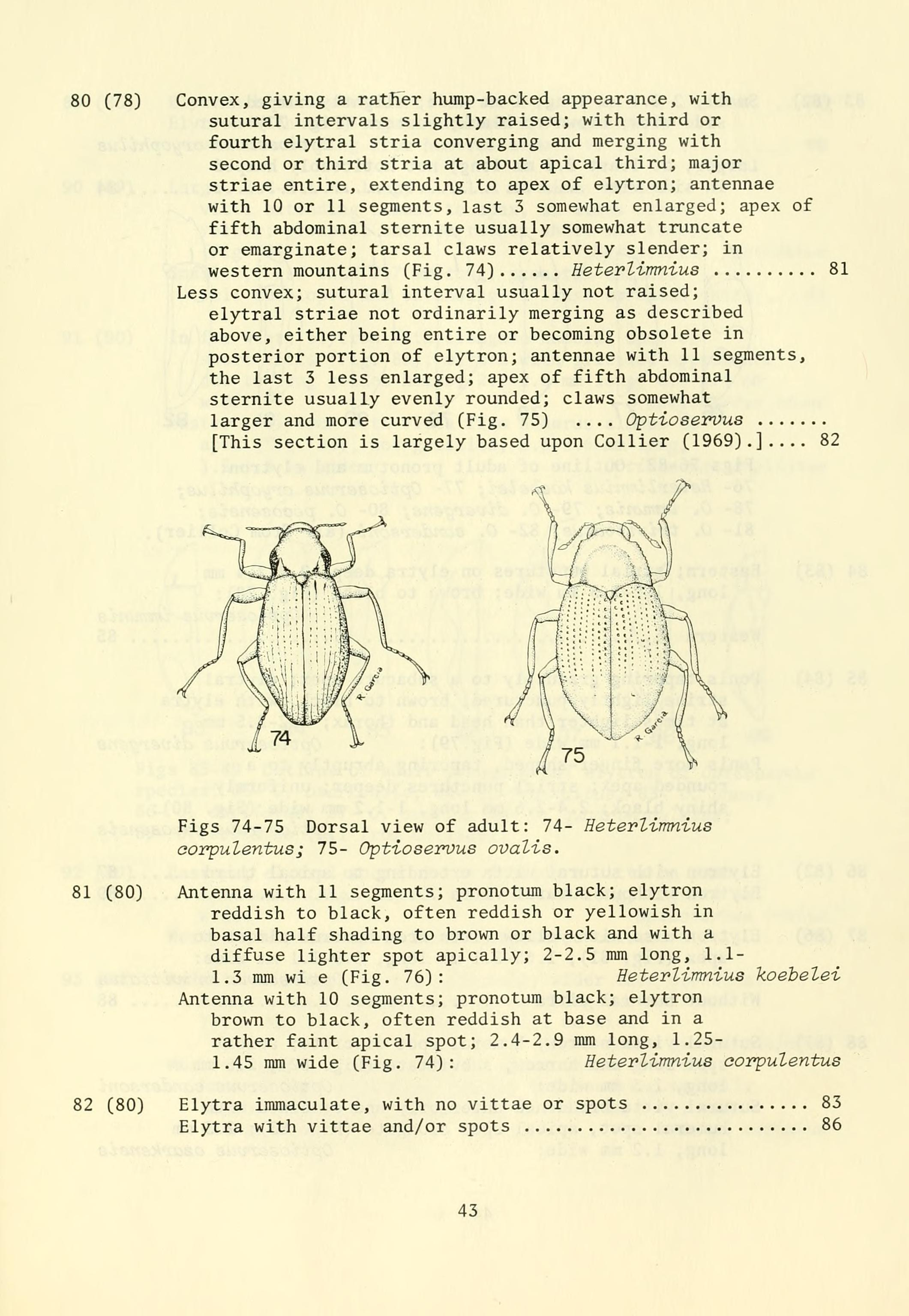

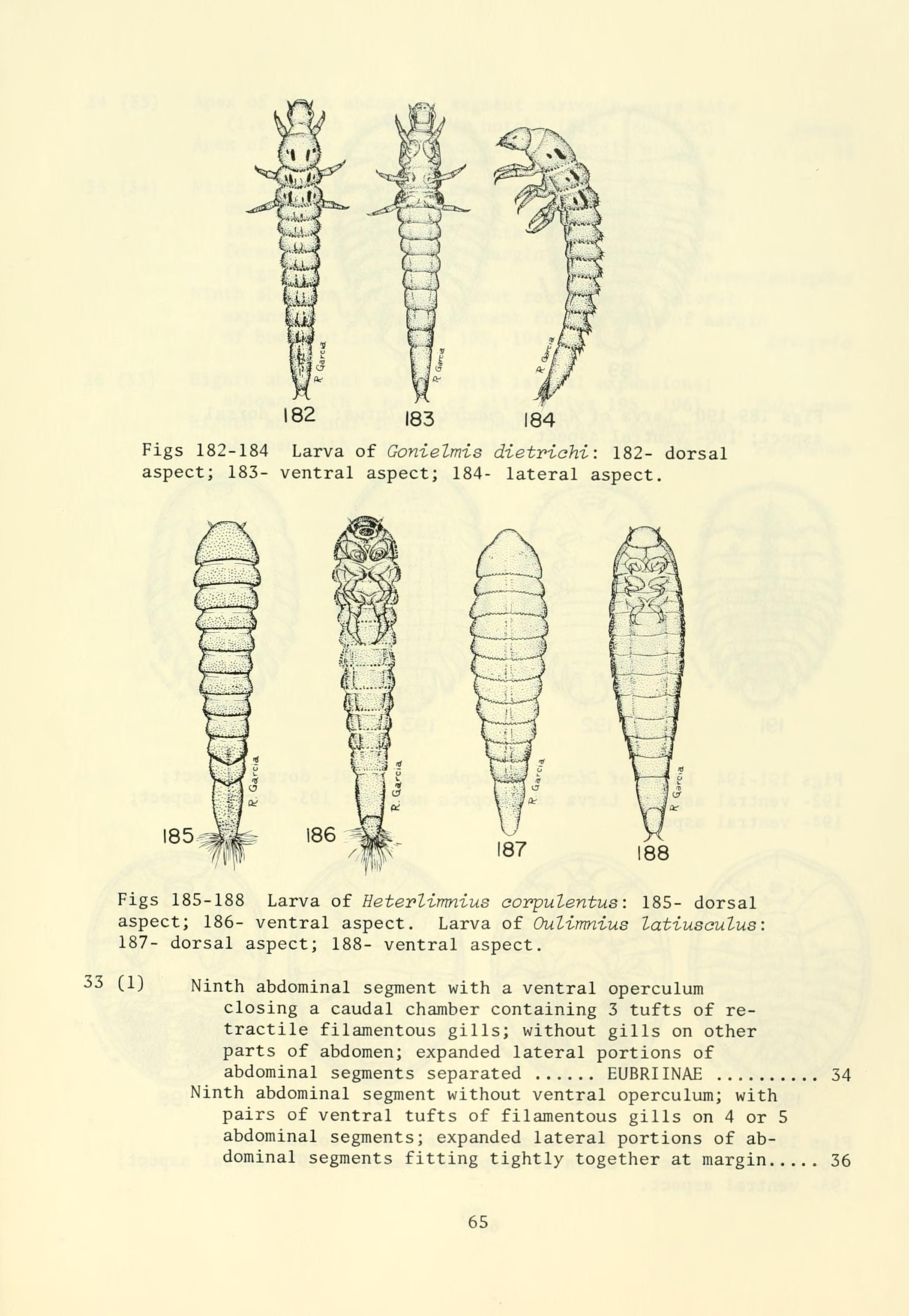
- Larva of Heterlimnius corpulentus on fig N.0 185-188

Scientific classification
- Domain: Eukaryota
- Kingdom: Animalia
- Phylum: Arthropoda
- Class: Insecta
- Order: Coleoptera
- Suborder: Polyphaga
- Infraorder: Elateriformia
- Family: Elmidae
- Tribe: Elmini
- Genus: Heterlimnius; Hinton, 1935

Synonyms
- Gonielmis; Optioservus

= Heterlimnius =

Genus of beetles

Heterlimnius is a genus of riffle beetles in the family Elmidae. When Optioservus and Gonielmis are synonymized with Heterlimnius in 2021, there are around 30 described species in Heterlimnius. Sources that recognize these genera as valid list fewer species.

== Species ==
These species belong to the genus Heterlimnius:

- Heterlimnius amabilis Kamite, 2011
- Heterlimnius ater (Nomura, 1958)
- Heterlimnius browni (White, 1978)
- Heterlimnius canus (Chandler, 1954)
- Heterlimnius castanipennis (Fall, 1925)
- Heterlimnius corpulentus (LeConte, 1874)
- Heterlimnius dietrichi (Sanderson, 1954)
- Heterlimnius divergens (LeConte, 1874)
- Heterlimnius ennearthrus Kamite, 2009
- Heterlimnius fastiditus (LeConte, 1850)
- Heterlimnius hasegawai (Nomura, 1958)
- Heterlimnius heteroclitus (White, 1978)
- Heterlimnius hisamatsui Kamite, 2009
- Heterlimnius horii Kamite, 2012
- Heterlimnius ikedai Kamite, 2011
- Heterlimnius immunis (Fall, 1925)
- Heterlimnius jaechi Kamite, 2009
- Heterlimnius koebelei (Martin, 1927)
- Heterlimnius ovalis (LeConte, 1863)
- Heterlimnius phaeus (White, 1978)
- Heterlimnius quadrigibbus Kamite, 2012
- Heterlimnius quadrimaculatus (Horn, 1870)
- Heterlimnius samlandica (Bollow, 1940)
- Heterlimnius sandersoni (Collier, 1972)
- Heterlimnius seriatus (LeConte, 1874)
- Heterlimnius shepardi Kamite, 2009
- Heterlimnius trachys (Janssens, 1959)
- Heterlimnius trivittatus (Brown, 1930)
- Heterlimnius vietnamensis Kamite, 2011
- Heterlimnius yokoii Kamite, 2012
