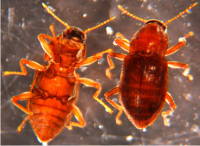
- Heterelmis comalensis

Scientific classification
- Kingdom: Animalia
- Phylum: Arthropoda
- Clade: Pancrustacea
- Class: Insecta
- Order: Coleoptera
- Suborder: Polyphaga
- Infraorder: Elateriformia
- Family: Elmidae
- Subfamily: Elminae
- Tribe: Elmini
- Genus: Heterelmis; Sharp, 1882

= Heterelmis =

Genus of beetles

Heterelmis is a genus of beetles in the riffle beetle family Elmidae and contains 22 extant species and 1 species that is presumed to be extinct.

Species include:

- Heterelmis apicata (Grouvelle, 1896)
- Heterelmis cervina (Grouvelle, 1896)
- Heterelmis comalensis Bosse, Tuff, and Brown, 1988
- Heterelmis convexicollis Delève, 1968
- Heterelmis debilis Polizei 2018
- Heterelmis dubia Grouvelle, 1889
- Heterelmis gibbosa (Grouvelle, 1889)
- Heterelmis glabra (Horn, 1870)
- Heterelmis impressicollis Delève, 1968
- Heterelmis limnoides Hinton, 1936
- Heterelmis longior (Grouvelle, 1896)
- Heterelmis longula Sharp, 1887
- Heterelmis lucida Delève, 1968
- Heterelmis neglecta Grouvelle, 1896
- Heterelmis obesa Hinton, 1936
- Heterelmis obscura Sharp, 1882
- Heterelmis pusilla Delève, 1968
- Heterelmis simplex Sharp 1882
- †Heterelmis stephani Brown, 1972
- Heterelmis tarsalis (Germain, 1892)
- Heterelmis trivialis (Germain, 1892)
- Heterelmis vilcanota Spangler, 1980
- Heterelmis vulnerata (LeConte, 1874)
