= Dubiraphia minima =

Scientific classification
- Kingdom: Animalia
- Phylum: Arthropoda
- Clade: Pancrustacea
- Class: Insecta
- Order: Coleoptera
- Suborder: Polyphaga
- Infraorder: Elateriformia
- Family: Elmidae
- Genus: Dubiraphia
- Species: D. minima

Binomial name
- Dubiraphia minima Hilsenhoff, 1973

Species of riffle beetle

Dubiraphia minima is a species of riffle beetle in the family Elmidae. It is found in North America.
