= Lutrochus luteus =

Scientific classification
- Domain: Eukaryota
- Kingdom: Animalia
- Phylum: Arthropoda
- Class: Insecta
- Order: Coleoptera
- Suborder: Polyphaga
- Infraorder: Elateriformia
- Family: Lutrochidae
- Genus: Lutrochus
- Species: L. luteus

Binomial name
- Lutrochus luteus Leconte, 1852

Species of beetle

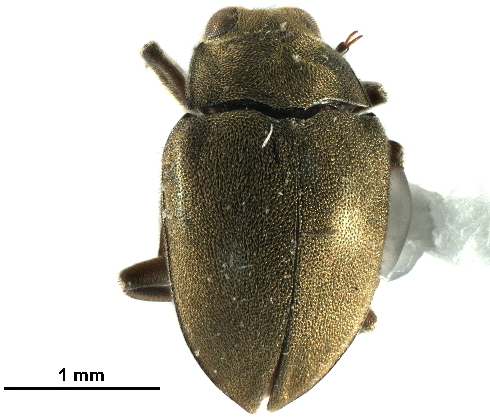

Lutrochus luteus is a species of travertine beetle in the family Lutrochidae. It is found in North America.
