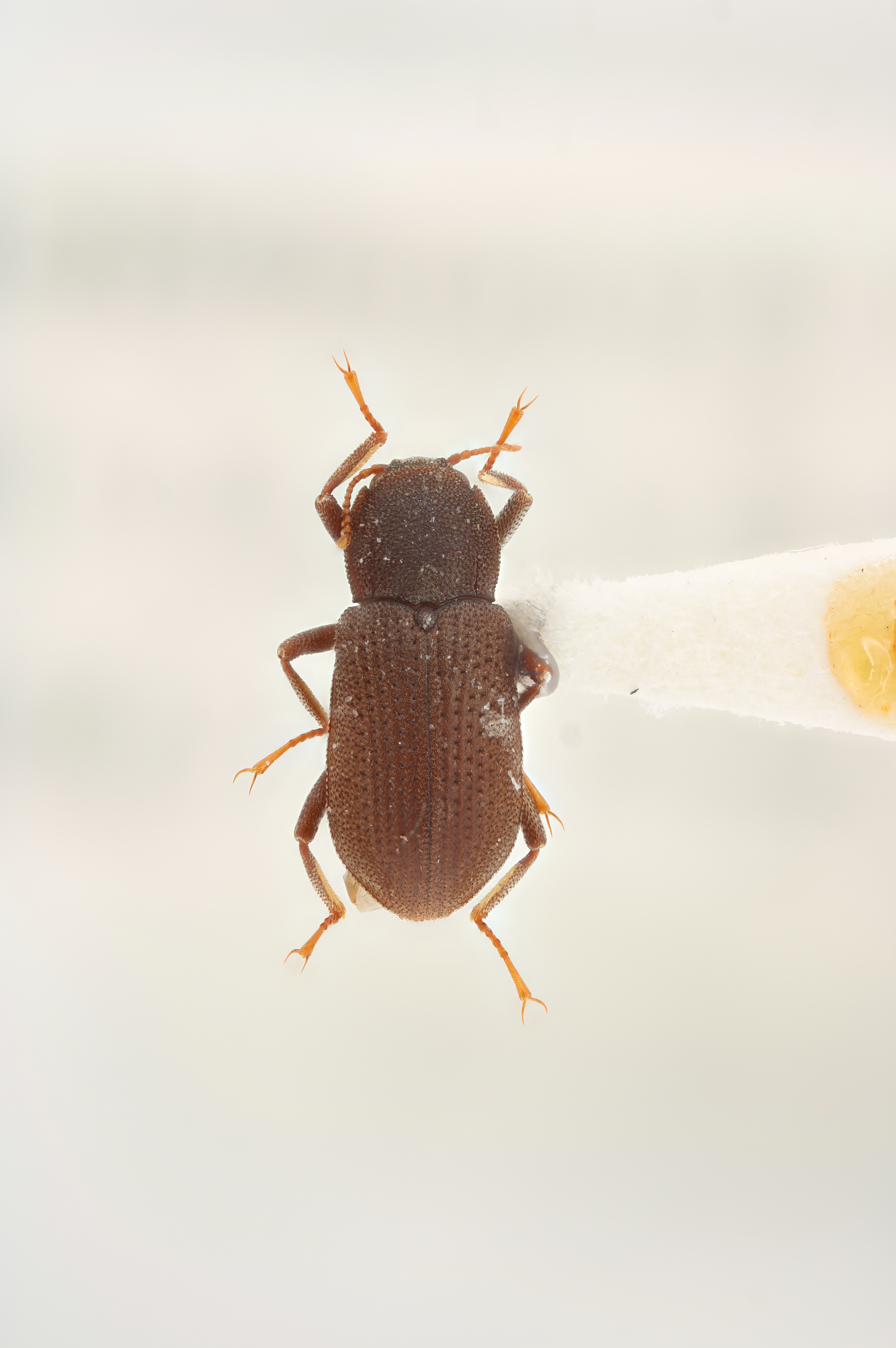
- Macrelmis shoemakel

Scientific classification
- Domain: Eukaryota
- Kingdom: Animalia
- Phylum: Arthropoda
- Class: Insecta
- Order: Coleoptera
- Suborder: Polyphaga
- Infraorder: Elateriformia
- Family: Elmidae
- Genus: Macrelmis
- Species: M. shoemakei

Binomial name
- Macrelmis shoemakei (Brown, 1971)

Synonyms
- Elsianus shoemakei Brown, 1971

= Macrelmis shoemakei =

Species of beetle

Macrelmis shoemakei is a species of riffle beetle in the family Elmidae. It is found in Central America and North America.
