= Optioservus canus =

Scientific classification
- Kingdom: Animalia
- Phylum: Arthropoda
- Clade: Pancrustacea
- Class: Insecta
- Order: Coleoptera
- Suborder: Polyphaga
- Infraorder: Elateriformia
- Family: Elmidae
- Genus: Optioservus
- Species: O. canus

Binomial name
- Optioservus canus Chandler, 1954

Species of beetle

Optioservus canus, the pinnacles optioservus riffle beetle, is a species of riffle beetle in the family Elmidae. It is found in North America.
