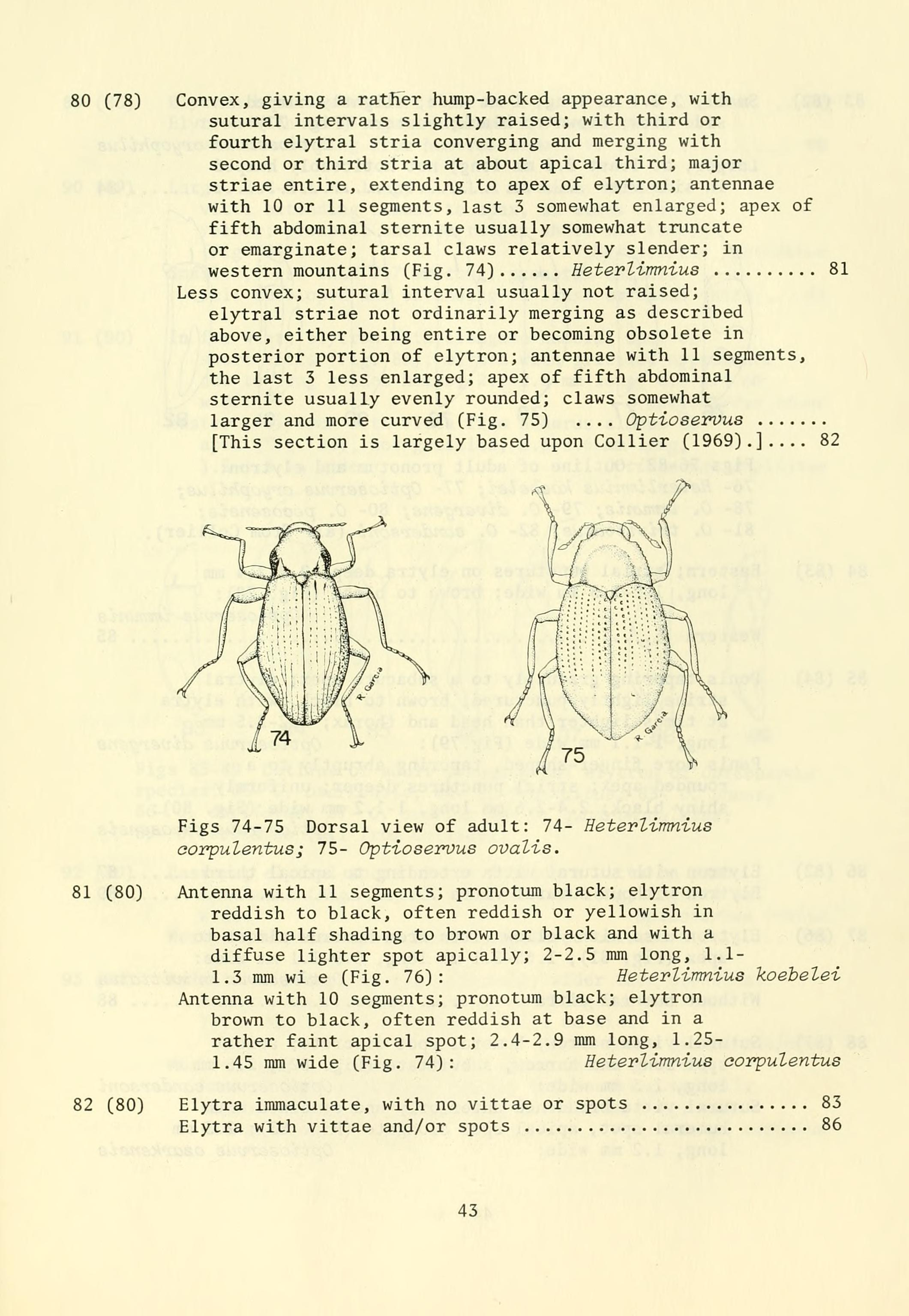
- Dorsal view of the adult H. corpulentus on fig N.0 74

Scientific classification
- Domain: Eukaryota
- Kingdom: Animalia
- Phylum: Arthropoda
- Class: Insecta
- Order: Coleoptera
- Suborder: Polyphaga
- Infraorder: Elateriformia
- Family: Elmidae
- Genus: Heterlimnius
- Species: H. corpulentus

Binomial name
- Heterlimnius corpulentus (LeConte, 1874)

Synonyms
- Elmis corpulenta LeConte, 1874; Elmis antennata Fall in Fall and Cockerell, 1907; Heterlimnius antennatus (Fall in Fall and Cockerell, 1907)

= Heterlimnius corpulentus =

Species of beetle

Heterlimnius corpulentus is a species of riffle beetle in the family Elmidae. It is found in western North America.
