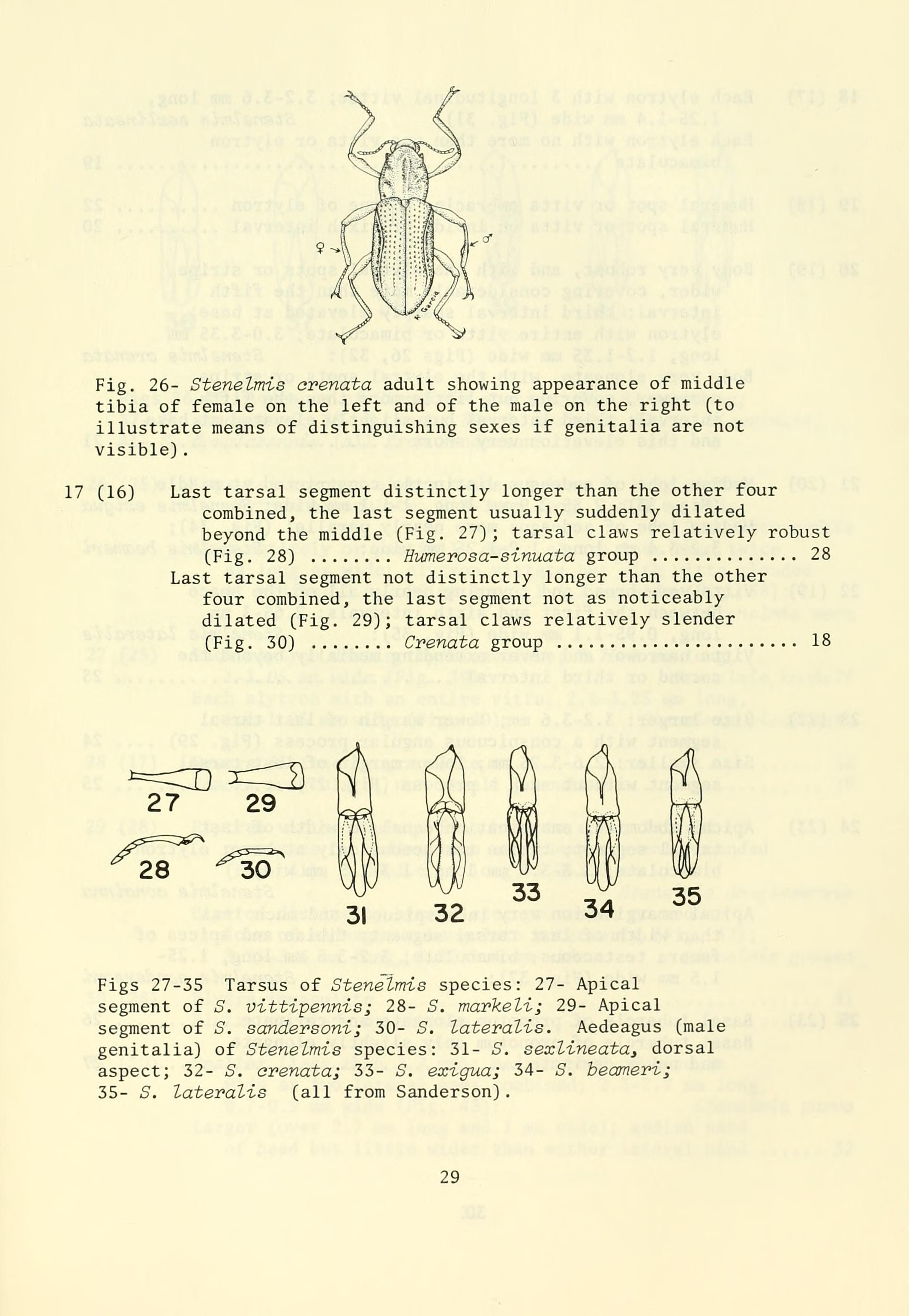
- Stenelmis crenata

Scientific classification
- Domain: Eukaryota
- Kingdom: Animalia
- Phylum: Arthropoda
- Class: Insecta
- Order: Coleoptera
- Suborder: Polyphaga
- Infraorder: Elateriformia
- Family: Elmidae
- Genus: Stenelmis
- Species: S. crenata

Binomial name
- Stenelmis crenata (Say, 1824)

Synonyms
- Elmis crenata Say, 1824; Stenelmis sordida Motschulsky, 1859

= Stenelmis crenata =

Species of beetle

Stenelmis crenata is a species of riffle beetle in the family Elmidae. It is found in North America.
