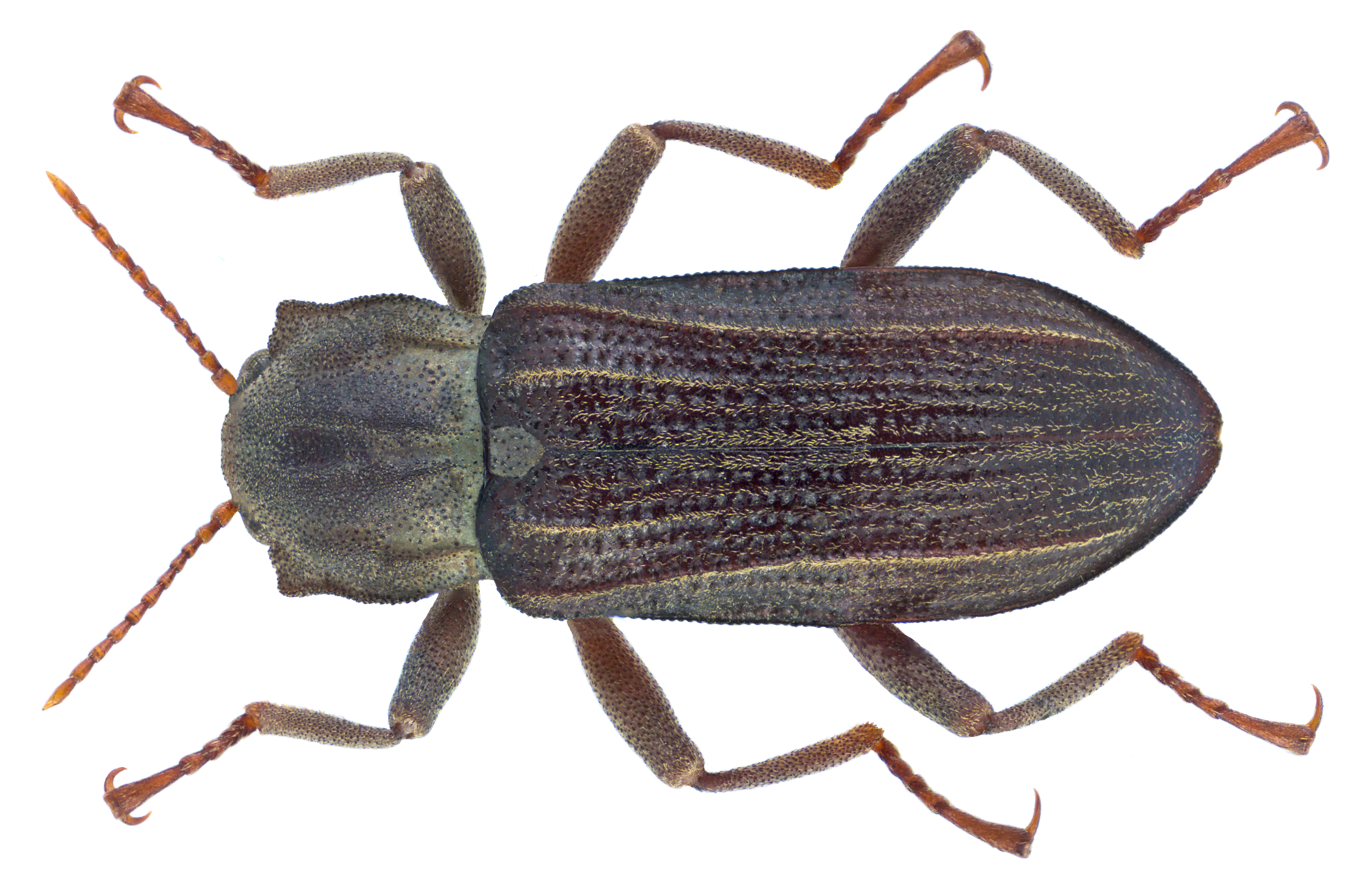

Scientific classification
- Domain: Eukaryota
- Kingdom: Animalia
- Phylum: Arthropoda
- Class: Insecta
- Order: Coleoptera
- Suborder: Polyphaga
- Infraorder: Elateriformia
- Family: Elmidae
- Genus: Stenelmis
- Species: S. canaliculata

Binomial name
- Stenelmis canaliculata (Gyllenhål, 1808)

Synonyms
- Limnius canaliculata Gyllenhål, 1808

= Stenelmis canaliculata =

Species of beetle

Stenelmis canaliculata is a species of beetle from the Elminae subfamily which can be found throughout Western Europe. It is the largest elmid beetle of the British Isles, with total length of 3.75–4.75 mm (0.148–0.187 in).
