= Optioservus trivittatus =

Scientific classification
- Domain: Eukaryota
- Kingdom: Animalia
- Phylum: Arthropoda
- Class: Insecta
- Order: Coleoptera
- Suborder: Polyphaga
- Infraorder: Elateriformia
- Family: Elmidae
- Genus: Optioservus
- Species: O. trivittatus

Binomial name
- Optioservus trivittatus (Brown, 1930)

Synonyms
- Limnius trivittatus Brown, 1930

Species of beetle

Optioservus trivittatus is a species of riffle beetle in the family Elmidae. It is found in North America.
