= Optioservus quadrimaculatus =

Scientific classification
- Domain: Eukaryota
- Kingdom: Animalia
- Phylum: Arthropoda
- Class: Insecta
- Order: Coleoptera
- Suborder: Polyphaga
- Infraorder: Elateriformia
- Family: Elmidae
- Genus: Optioservus
- Species: O. quadrimaculatus

Binomial name
- Optioservus quadrimaculatus (Horn, 1870)

Species of beetle

Optioservus quadrimaculatus is a species of riffle beetle in the family Elmidae. It is found in North America.
