= Optioservus immunis =

Scientific classification
- Domain: Eukaryota
- Kingdom: Animalia
- Phylum: Arthropoda
- Class: Insecta
- Order: Coleoptera
- Suborder: Polyphaga
- Infraorder: Elateriformia
- Family: Elmidae
- Genus: Optioservus
- Species: O. immunis

Binomial name
- Optioservus immunis (Fall, 1925)

Synonyms
- Helmis immunis Fall, 1925; Limnius cryophilus Musgrave, 1932; Optioservus cryophilus (Musgrave, 1932)

Species of beetle

Optioservus immunis is a species of riffle beetle in the family Elmidae. It is found in North America.
