= Stenelmis bicarinata =

Scientific classification
- Domain: Eukaryota
- Kingdom: Animalia
- Phylum: Arthropoda
- Class: Insecta
- Order: Coleoptera
- Suborder: Polyphaga
- Infraorder: Elateriformia
- Family: Elmidae
- Genus: Stenelmis
- Species: S. bicarinata

Binomial name
- Stenelmis bicarinata Leconte, 1852

Synonyms
- Stenelmis convexula Sanderson, 1938; Stenelmis maerkelii Motschulsky, 1854; Stenelmis vittipennis Zimmermann, 1869

Species of beetle

Stenelmis bicarinata is a species of riffle beetle in the family Elmidae. It is found in Central America and North America.
