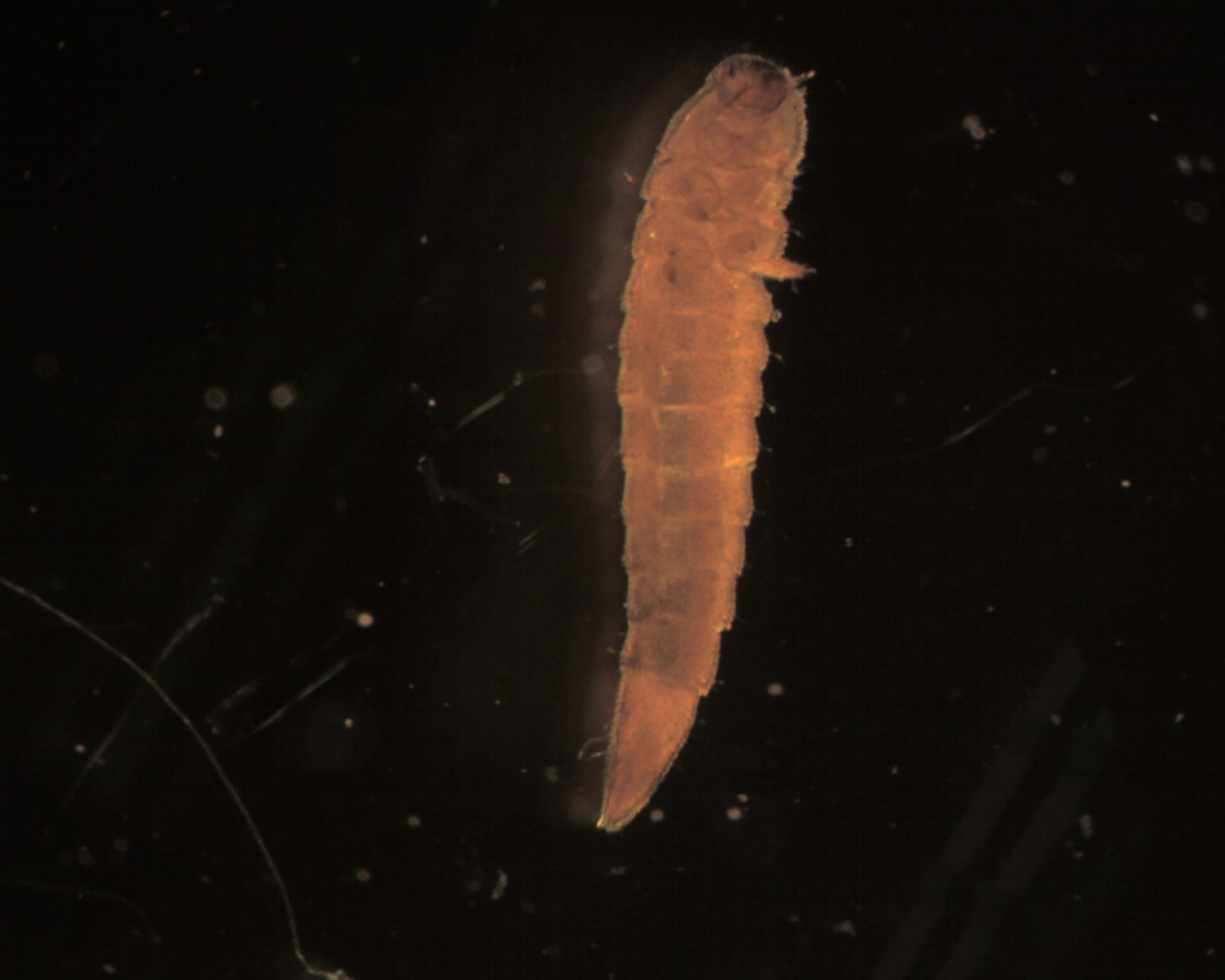
- Optioservus larva

Scientific classification
- Kingdom: Animalia
- Phylum: Arthropoda
- Clade: Pancrustacea
- Class: Insecta
- Order: Coleoptera
- Suborder: Polyphaga
- Infraorder: Elateriformia
- Family: Elmidae
- Subfamily: Elminae
- Tribe: Elmini
- Genus: Optioservus; Sanderson, 1954

= Optioservus =

Genus of beetles

Optioservus was a genus of riffle beetles in the family Elmidae; as of 2021 it is a junior synonym of Heterlimnius. There were about 13 described species in Optioservus.

== Species ==
- Optioservus browni White, 1978 (Brown's optioservus riffle beetle)
- Optioservus canus Chandler, 1954 (pinnacles optioservus riffle beetle)
- Optioservus castanipennis (Fall, 1925)
- Optioservus divergens (LeConte, 1874)
- Optioservus fastiditus (LeConte, 1850)
- Optioservus heteroclitus White, 1978
- Optioservus immunis (Fall, 1925)
- Optioservus ovalis (LeConte, 1863)
- Optioservus phaeus White, 1978 (Scott optioservus riffle beetle)
- Optioservus quadrimaculatus (Horn, 1870)
- Optioservus sandersoni Collier, 1972
- Optioservus seriatus (LeConte, 1874)
- Optioservus trivittatus (Brown, 1930)
