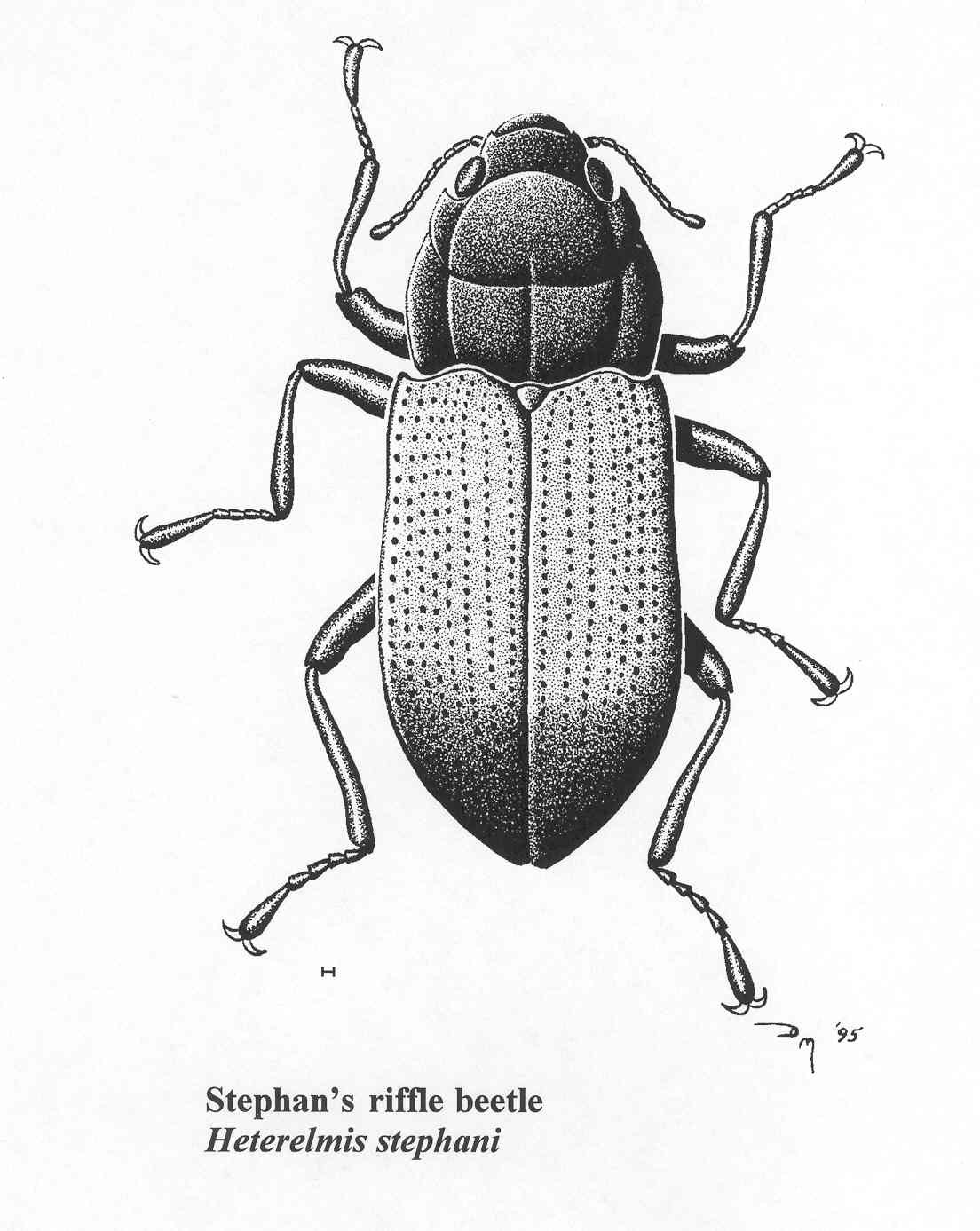

Conservation status
- Presumed Extinct (2016) (NatureServe)

Scientific classification
- Domain: Eukaryota
- Kingdom: Animalia
- Phylum: Arthropoda
- Class: Insecta
- Order: Coleoptera
- Suborder: Polyphaga
- Infraorder: Elateriformia
- Family: Elmidae
- Genus: Heterelmis
- Species: †H. stephani

Binomial name
- †Heterelmis stephani Brown, 1972

= Heterelmis stephani =

Extinct species of beetle found in Arizona, U.S.

Heterelmis stephani was a rare species of aquatic beetle known by the common name Stephan's riffle beetle. It was endemic to Arizona in the United States, where it occurred in the Santa Rita Mountains before being declared presumed extinct. It was brown in color with small black dots on its wings.

== Description ==
The beetle was discovered in 1969 by Karl Stephan, of Tucson, Arizona, after whom the species was named, and formally described as a new species in 1972 by Harley Brown of the University of Oklahoma. Stephan initially collected seven samples on February 6, 1969 and sent them to Brown for identification. When Brown realized the samples were of a new species, he requested more specimens and Stephan collected a further one larval and 64 adult samples on May 16, 1970. It is 2.3 mm (0.091 in) to 2.6 mm (0.10 in) long and 1.05 mm (0.041 in) to 1.2 mm (0.047 in) in width. It is generally light to dark brown in color, with some parts reddish brown. The male and female are generally similar. The beetle has dozens of small black dots on its wings. Little else is known about the beetle. Riffle beetles are aquatic, leaving the water only during metamorphosis from the larvae stage. They lose their wings and ability to fly after returning to water as adults where they spend the remainder of their lives underwater. Survival depends upon water with a high content of dissolved oxygen. Riffle beetles eat plants or decomposing material and biofilm.

The species holotype was provided to the Canadian Museum of Nature (Ottawa) in 1970. Additional paratypes were provided to the British Museum of Natural History (London), the National Museum of Natural History (Washington, DC), the University of Arizona (Tucson), the Illinois Natural History Survey (Urbana), the California Academy of Sciences (San Francisco), the University of Oklahoma (Norman), and the private collection of Karl Stephan.

== Habitat ==
The known habitats of Stephan's riffle were only in Madera Canyon, on the west flank of the Santa Rita Mountains in Coronado National Forest (southeastern Arizona, United States). There it was found only in two specific locations, Bog Spring and Sylvester Spring. At the time of its discovery at Bog Spring, the beetle was living in a wet area proximate to a leaking pipe that diverted water from the spring to the Bog Spring Campground.

== Extinction ==
The United States Fish and Wildlife Service (USFWS) declared the beetle needed conservation in 1984. The leaky pipe had been repaired in 1976, removing the habitat. The beetle was observed during other water leaks in 1972 and 1987, but never in the natural outflow of the spring itself. It was last observed in 1993 at Sylvester Spring. In 2002, it was considered for listing under the Endangered Species Act. It was not known at that time if the species still existed.

Between 2012 and 2016, the USFWS surveyed Sylvester Spring, and seven other locations with potential habitat multiple times using three different survey methods and no beetles were detected.

In 2016, the service announced that the beetle had not been observed for twenty years and was considered extinct. It therefore was not eligible for listing under the Endangered Species Act and has been withdrawn as a candidate.
