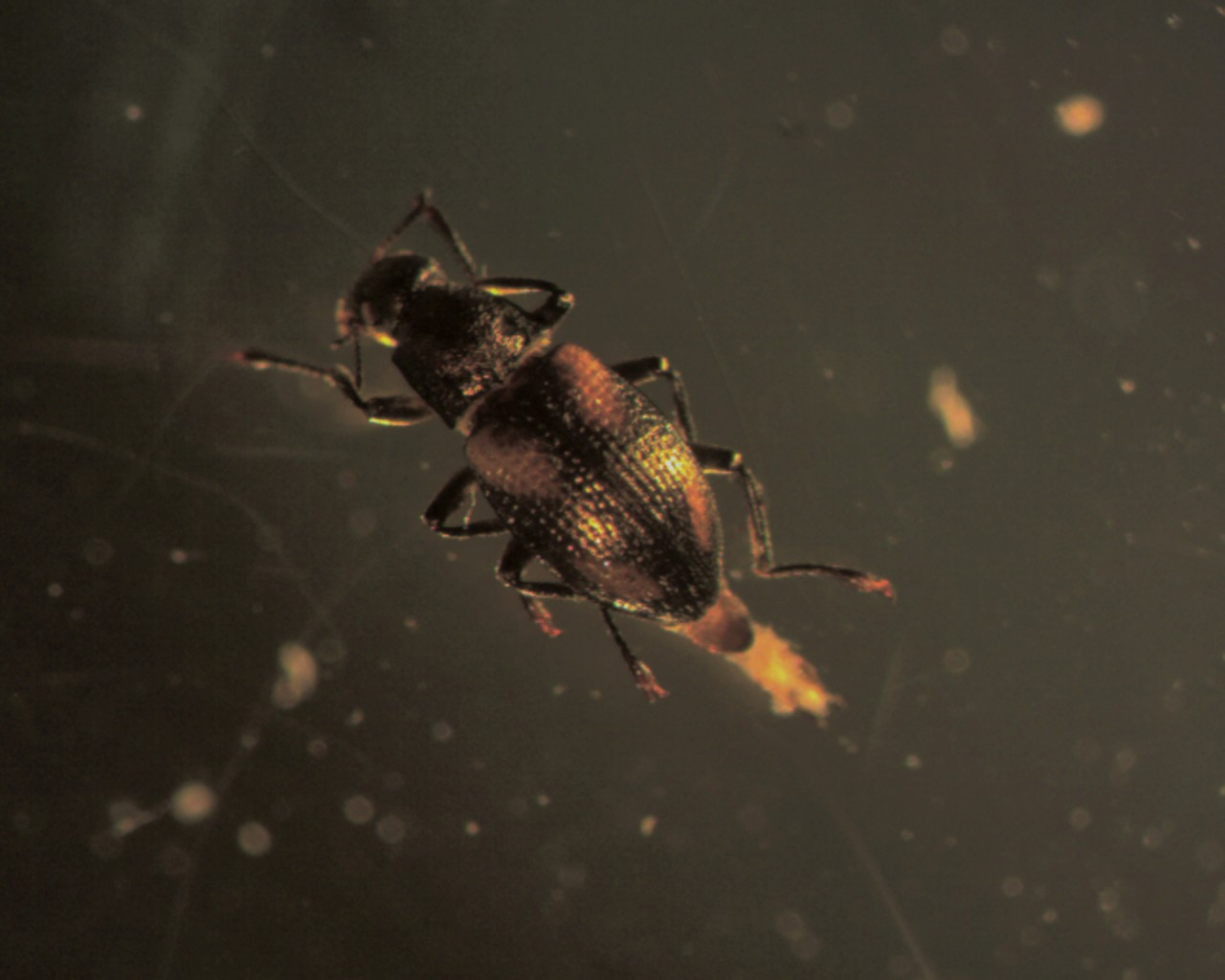
- Adult Dubiraphia

Scientific classification
- Kingdom: Animalia
- Phylum: Arthropoda
- Class: Insecta
- Order: Coleoptera
- Suborder: Polyphaga
- Infraorder: Elateriformia
- Family: Elmidae
- Subfamily: Elminae
- Tribe: Elmini
- Genus: Dubiraphia; Sanderson, 1954

= Dubiraphia =

Genus of beetles

Dubiraphia is a genus of riffle beetles in the family Elmidae. There are about 11 described species in Dubiraphia.

== Species ==
- Dubiraphia bivittata (Leconte, 1852)
- Dubiraphia brevipennis Hilsenhoff, 1973
- Dubiraphia browni Hilsenhoff, 1973
- Dubiraphia brunnescens (Fall, 1925) (brownish dubiraphian riffle beetle)
- Dubiraphia giulianii (Van Dyke, 1949) (Giuliani's dubiraphian riffle beetle)
- Dubiraphia harleyi Barr, 1984
- Dubiraphia minima Hilsenhoff, 1973
- Dubiraphia parva Hilsenhoff, 1973 (little dubiraphian riffle beetle)
- Dubiraphia quadrinotata (Say, 1825)
- Dubiraphia robusta Hilsenhoff, 1973
- Dubiraphia vittata (Melsheimer, 1844)
