= Stenelmis gammoni =

Conservation status
- Vulnerable (IUCN 2.3)

Scientific classification
- Kingdom: Animalia
- Phylum: Arthropoda
- Class: Insecta
- Order: Coleoptera
- Suborder: Polyphaga
- Infraorder: Elateriformia
- Family: Elmidae
- Genus: Stenelmis
- Species: S. gammoni

Binomial name
- Stenelmis gammoni White & Brown, 1976

Species of beetle

Stenelmis gammoni is a species of beetle in the riffle beetle family, Elmidae. It is known by the common name Gammon's riffle beetle.

The beetle is native to the United States. It was first described from the New River in North Carolina in 1976. Its total distribution is still unclear, but it has been found in Virginia and Alabama as well.

The specimens used in the original species description were dark brown to black beetles with elongated, convex bodies measuring between 2 and 3 millimetres (0.079 and 0.118 in) long. Each elytron has two spots.
