= Stenelmis consobrina =

Scientific classification
- Domain: Eukaryota
- Kingdom: Animalia
- Phylum: Arthropoda
- Class: Insecta
- Order: Coleoptera
- Suborder: Polyphaga
- Infraorder: Elateriformia
- Family: Elmidae
- Genus: Stenelmis
- Species: S. consobrina

Binomial name
- Stenelmis consobrina Dufour, 1835

Species of beetle

Stenelmis consobrina is a species of beetle from the subfamily Elminae which can be found in France, Greece, Spain, Switzerland, Italy, and Sardinia.
