= Stenelmis sandersoni =

Scientific classification
- Domain: Eukaryota
- Kingdom: Animalia
- Phylum: Arthropoda
- Class: Insecta
- Order: Coleoptera
- Suborder: Polyphaga
- Infraorder: Elateriformia
- Family: Elmidae
- Genus: Stenelmis
- Species: S. sandersoni

Binomial name
- Stenelmis sandersoni Musgrave, 1940

Species of beetle

Stenelmis sandersoni is a species of riffle beetle in the family Elmidae. It is found in North America.
