= Heterelmis obesa =

Scientific classification
- Kingdom: Animalia
- Phylum: Arthropoda
- Class: Insecta
- Order: Coleoptera
- Suborder: Polyphaga
- Infraorder: Elateriformia
- Family: Elmidae
- Genus: Heterelmis
- Species: H. obesa

Binomial name
- Heterelmis obesa Sharp, 1882

Species of beetle

Heterelmis obesa is a species of riffle beetle in the family Elmidae. It is found in Central America, North America, and South America.

== Subspecies ==
These two subspecies belong to the species Heterelmis obesa:

- Heterelmis obesa obesa
- Heterelmis obesa plana Hinton, 1936
