= Optioservus fastiditus =

Scientific classification
- Domain: Eukaryota
- Kingdom: Animalia
- Phylum: Arthropoda
- Class: Insecta
- Order: Coleoptera
- Suborder: Polyphaga
- Infraorder: Elateriformia
- Family: Elmidae
- Genus: Optioservus
- Species: O. fastiditus

Binomial name
- Optioservus fastiditus (LeConte, 1850)

Synonyms
- Limnius fastiditus LeConte, 1850

Species of beetle

Optioservus fastiditus is a species of riffle beetle in the family Elmidae. It is found in North America.
