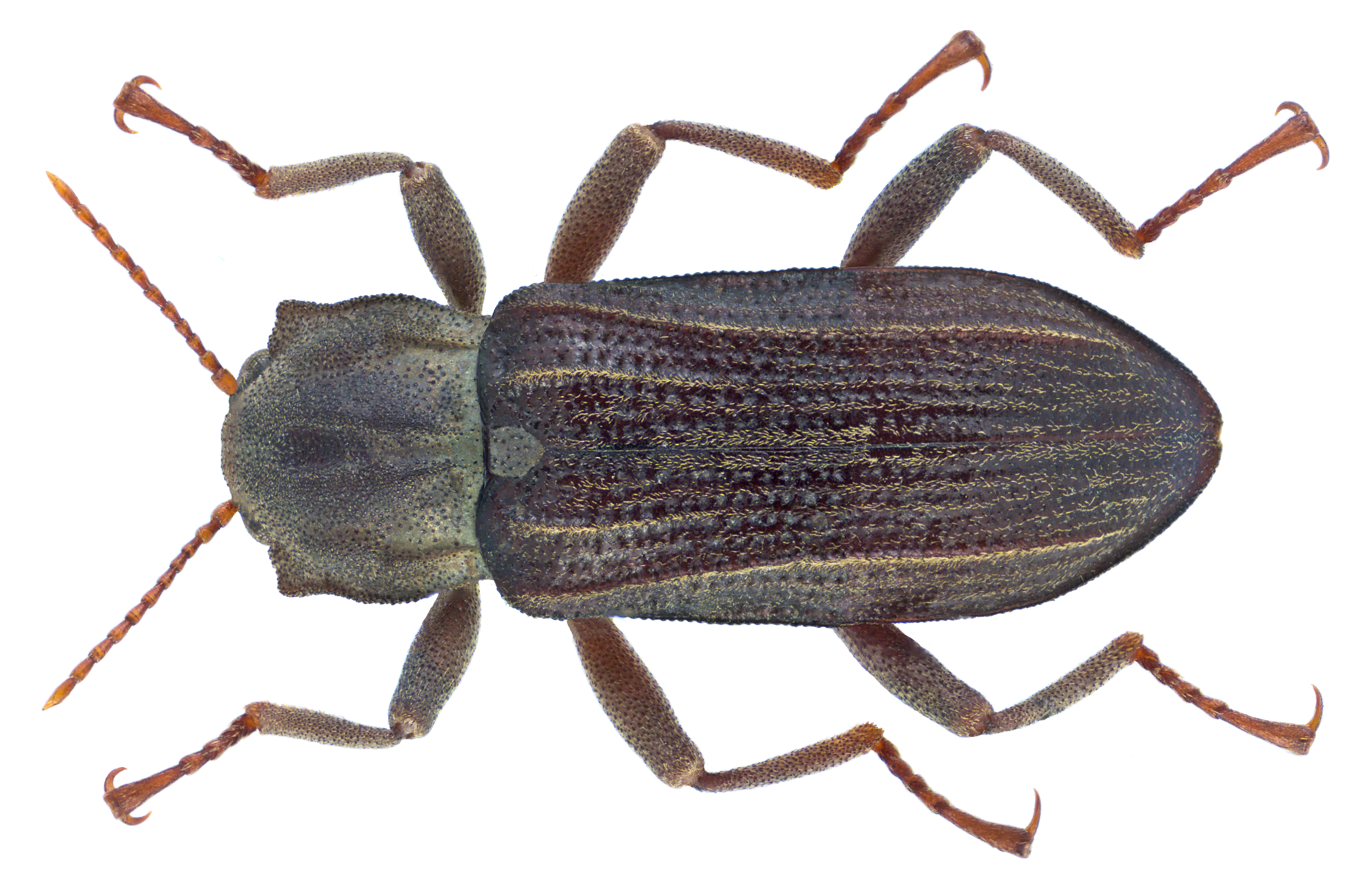
- Stenelmis canaliculata

Scientific classification
- Domain: Eukaryota
- Kingdom: Animalia
- Phylum: Arthropoda
- Class: Insecta
- Order: Coleoptera
- Suborder: Polyphaga
- Infraorder: Elateriformia
- Family: Elmidae
- Subfamily: Elminae
- Tribe: Elmini
- Genus: Stenelmis; Dufour, 1835

= Stenelmis =

Genus of beetles

Stenelmis is the largest and most widespread genus of beetles in the family Elmidae.

It contains the following species:

- Stenelmis antennalis Sanderson, 1938
- Stenelmis beameri Sanderson, 1938
- Stenelmis bicarinata LeConte, 1852
- Stenelmis calida Chandler, 1949
- Stenelmis canaliculata (Gyllenhal, 1808)
- Stenelmis concinna Sanderson, 1938
- Stenelmis consobrina Dufour, 1835
- Stenelmis cheryl Brown, 1987
- Stenelmis convexula Sanderson, 1938
- Stenelmis crenata (Say, 1824)
- Stenelmis decorata Sanderson, 1938
- Stenelmis douglasensis Sanderson, 1938
- Stenelmis exigua Sanderson, 1938
- Stenelmis exilis Sanderson, 1938
- Stenelmis florala Schmude
- Stenelmis fuscata Blatchley, 1925
- Stenelmis gammoni White & Brown, 1976
- Stenelmis grossa Sanderson, 1938
- Stenelmis harleyi Schmude
- Stenelmis humerosa
- Stenelmis hungerfordi Sanderson, 1938
- Stenelmis knobeli Sanderson, 1938
- Stenelmis lariversi Schmude, 1999
- Stenelmis lateralis Sanderson, 1938
- Stenelmis lignicola
- Stenelmis mera Sanderson, 1938
- Stenelmis mirabilis
- Stenelmis lignicola
- Stenelmis mera
- Stenelmis mirabilis Sanderson, 1938
- Stenelmis moapa
- Stenelmis musgravei
- Stenelmis occidentalis Schmude and Brown, 1991
- Stenelmis parva
- Stenelmis puberula Reitter, 1887
- Stenelmis quadrimaculata Horn, 1870
- Stenelmis sandersoni Musgrave, 1940
- Stenelmis sexlineata Sanderson, 1938
- Stenelmis sinuata LeConte, 1852
- Stenelmis vittipennis Zimmermann, 1869
- Stenelmis williami
- Stenelmis xylonastis Schmude and Barr in Schmude, Barr and Brown, 1992
