= Optioservus sandersoni =

Scientific classification
- Domain: Eukaryota
- Kingdom: Animalia
- Phylum: Arthropoda
- Class: Insecta
- Order: Coleoptera
- Suborder: Polyphaga
- Infraorder: Elateriformia
- Family: Elmidae
- Genus: Optioservus
- Species: O. sandersoni

Binomial name
- Optioservus sandersoni Collier, 1972

Synonyms
- Optioservus ozarkensis Collier, 1972

Species of beetle

Optioservus sandersoni is a species of riffle beetle in the family Elmidae. It is found in North America.
