= Dubiraphia brunnescens =

Scientific classification
- Domain: Eukaryota
- Kingdom: Animalia
- Phylum: Arthropoda
- Class: Insecta
- Order: Coleoptera
- Suborder: Polyphaga
- Infraorder: Elateriformia
- Family: Elmidae
- Genus: Dubiraphia
- Species: D. brunnescens

Binomial name
- Dubiraphia brunnescens (Fall, 1925)

Synonyms
- Helmis brunnescens Fall, 1925

Species of beetle

Dubiraphia brunnescens, the brownish dubiraphian riffle beetle, is a species of riffle beetle in the family Elmidae. It is found in North America.
