= Heterlimnius koebelei =

Scientific classification
- Domain: Eukaryota
- Kingdom: Animalia
- Phylum: Arthropoda
- Class: Insecta
- Order: Coleoptera
- Suborder: Polyphaga
- Infraorder: Elateriformia
- Family: Elmidae
- Genus: Heterlimnius
- Species: H. koebelei

Binomial name
- Heterlimnius koebelei (Martin, 1927)

Synonyms
- Helmis koebelei Martin, 1927

Species of beetle

Heterlimnius koebelei is a species of riffle beetle in the family Elmidae. It is found in North America.
