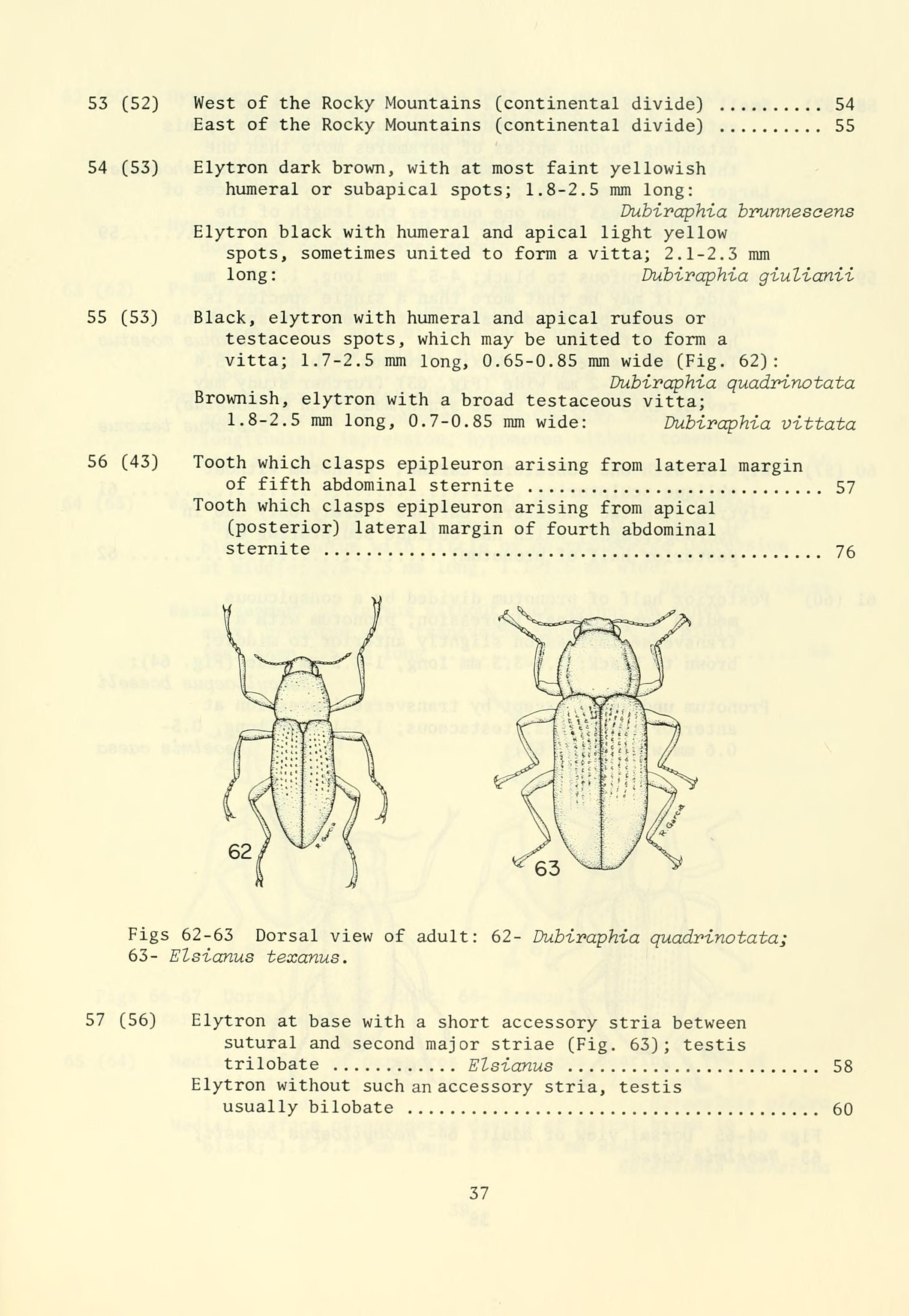
- Adult Dubiraphia quandrinotata on fig N.0 63

Scientific classification
- Domain: Eukaryota
- Kingdom: Animalia
- Phylum: Arthropoda
- Class: Insecta
- Order: Coleoptera
- Suborder: Polyphaga
- Infraorder: Elateriformia
- Family: Elmidae
- Genus: Dubiraphia
- Species: D. quadrinotata

Binomial name
- Dubiraphia quadrinotata (Say, 1825)

Synonyms
- Elmis quadrinotata Say, 1825

= Dubiraphia quadrinotata =

Species of beetle

Dubiraphia quadrinotata is a species of riffle beetle in the family Elmidae. It is found in North America.
