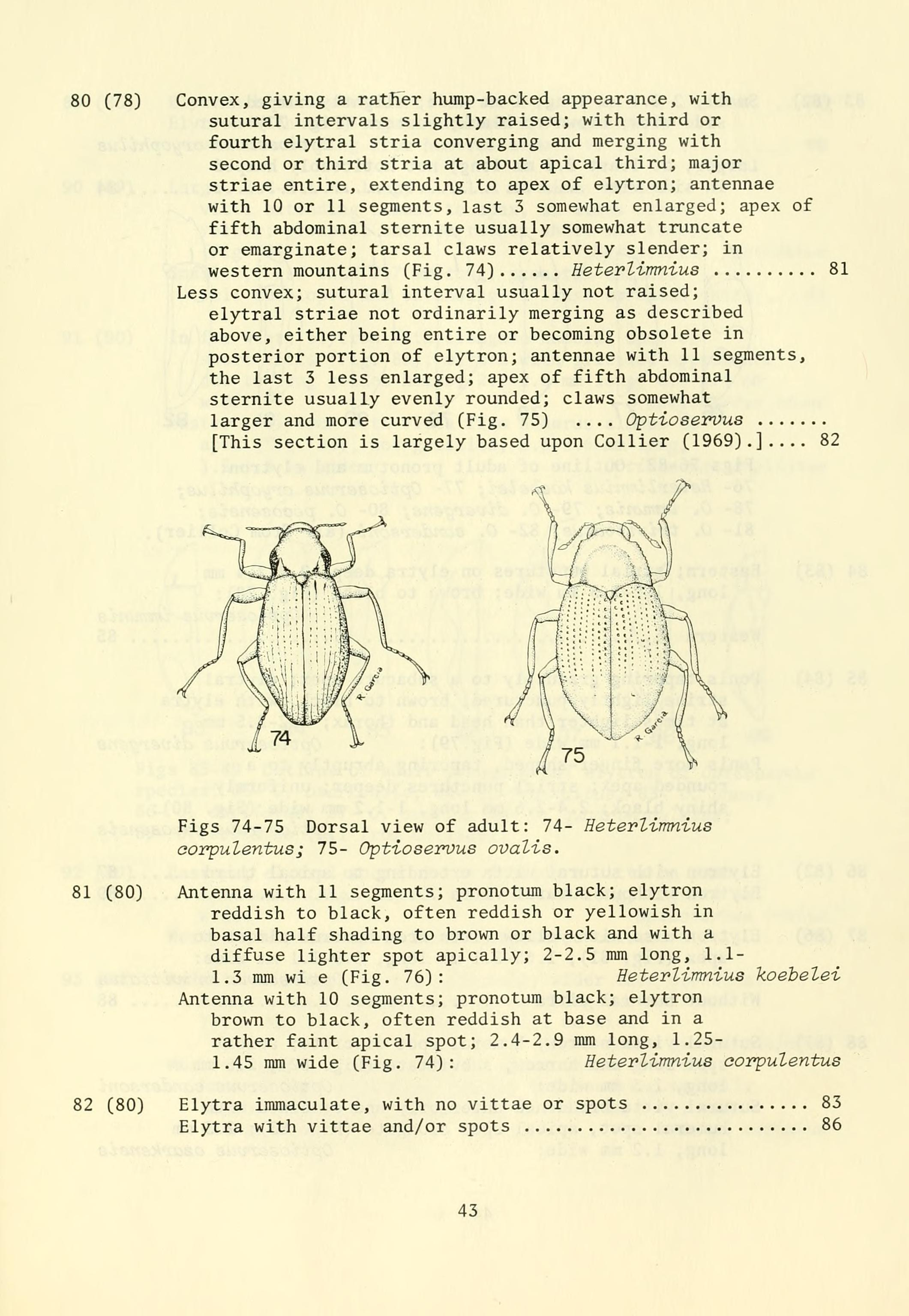

Scientific classification
- Domain: Eukaryota
- Kingdom: Animalia
- Phylum: Arthropoda
- Class: Insecta
- Order: Coleoptera
- Suborder: Polyphaga
- Infraorder: Elateriformia
- Family: Elmidae
- Genus: Optioservus
- Species: O. ovalis

Binomial name
- Optioservus ovalis (LeConte, 1863)

Synonyms
- Helmis ampliata Fall, 1925; Limnius ovalis LeConte, 1863; Optioservus ampliatus (Fall, 1925)

= Optioservus ovalis =

Species of beetle

Optioservus ovalis is a species of riffle beetle in the family Elmidae. It is found in North America.
