= Lutrochus laticeps =

Scientific classification
- Kingdom: Animalia
- Phylum: Arthropoda
- Class: Insecta
- Order: Coleoptera
- Suborder: Polyphaga
- Infraorder: Elateriformia
- Family: Lutrochidae
- Genus: Lutrochus
- Species: L. laticeps

Binomial name
- Lutrochus laticeps Casey, 1893

Species of beetle

Lutrochus laticeps is a species of travertine beetle in the family Lutrochidae. It is found in North America.
