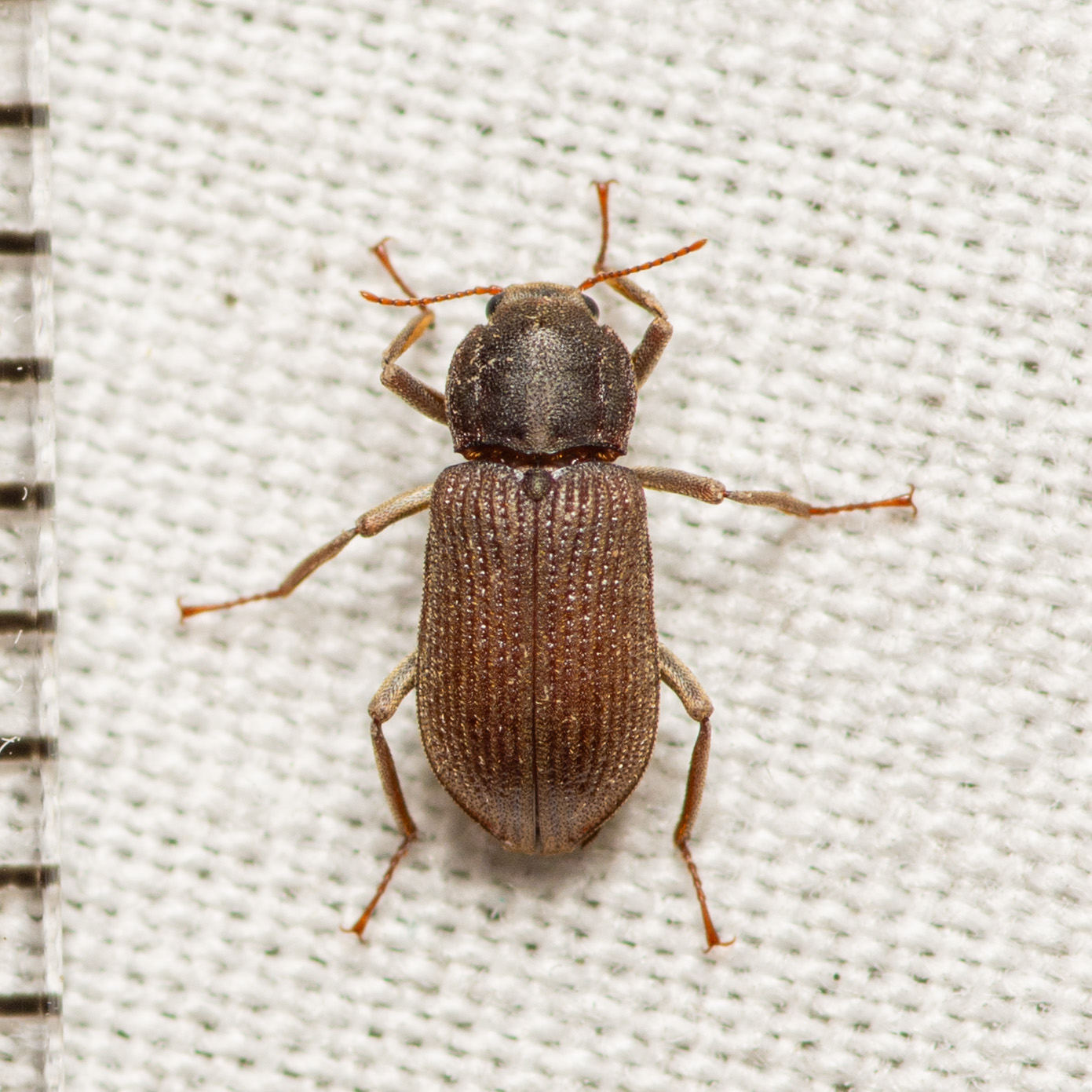

Scientific classification
- Domain: Eukaryota
- Kingdom: Animalia
- Phylum: Arthropoda
- Class: Insecta
- Order: Coleoptera
- Suborder: Polyphaga
- Infraorder: Elateriformia
- Family: Elmidae
- Genus: Macrelmis
- Species: M. texana

Binomial name
- Macrelmis texana (Schaeffer, 1911)

Synonyms
- Elsianus texanus Schaeffer, 1911

= Macrelmis texana =

Species of beetle

Macrelmis texana is a species of riffle beetle in the family Elmidae. It is found in Central America and North America.
