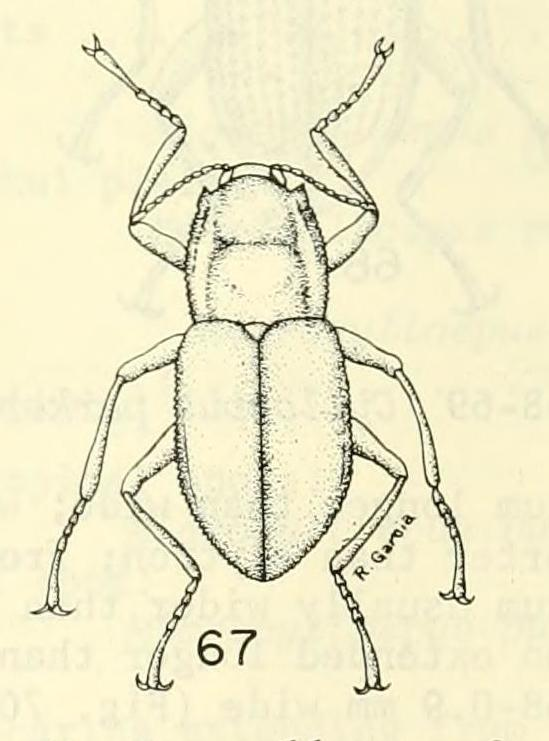
- Heterelmis vulnerata

Scientific classification
- Domain: Eukaryota
- Kingdom: Animalia
- Phylum: Arthropoda
- Class: Insecta
- Order: Coleoptera
- Suborder: Polyphaga
- Infraorder: Elateriformia
- Family: Elmidae
- Genus: Heterelmis
- Species: H. vulnerata

Binomial name
- Heterelmis vulnerata (Leconte, 1874)

Synonyms
- Elmis vulnerata LeConte, 1874

= Heterelmis vulnerata =

Species of beetle

Heterelmis vulnerata is a species of riffle beetle in the family Elmidae. It is found in Central America and North America.
