= Optioservus seriatus =

Scientific classification
- Domain: Eukaryota
- Kingdom: Animalia
- Phylum: Arthropoda
- Class: Insecta
- Order: Coleoptera
- Suborder: Polyphaga
- Infraorder: Elateriformia
- Family: Elmidae
- Genus: Optioservus
- Species: O. seriatus

Binomial name
- Optioservus seriatus (LeConte, 1874)

Synonyms
- Elmis seriata LeConte, 1874

Species of insect

Optioservus seriatus is a species of riffle beetle in the family Elmidae. It is found in North America.
