= Heterelmis glabra =

Scientific classification
- Kingdom: Animalia
- Phylum: Arthropoda
- Class: Insecta
- Order: Coleoptera
- Suborder: Polyphaga
- Infraorder: Elateriformia
- Family: Elmidae
- Genus: Heterelmis
- Species: H. glabra

Binomial name
- Heterelmis glabra (Horn, 1870)

Synonyms
- Elmis glabra Horn, 1870; Heterelmis acicula Hinton, 1940

Species of beetle

Heterelmis glabra is a species of riffle beetle in the family Elmidae. It is found in Central America and North America. The largest populations of this riffle beetle are found in springs associated with the upper Devils River in south-central Texas. Spring-adapted organisms such as this beetle have life-history patterns requiring surface components, which makes them more vulnerable to changes in spring flow that alter the surface habitat.
