= Stenelmis knobeli =

Scientific classification
- Kingdom: Animalia
- Phylum: Arthropoda
- Class: Insecta
- Order: Coleoptera
- Suborder: Polyphaga
- Infraorder: Elateriformia
- Family: Elmidae
- Genus: Stenelmis
- Species: S. knobeli

Binomial name
- Stenelmis knobeli Sanderson, 1938

Species of beetle

Stenelmis knobeli is a species of endangered beetles. It has a sculptured pronotum, light markings on elytra, a filiform antennae, and the adults are 2.53–3.10 millimetres (0.100–0.122 in) long. Its common name is Knobel's riffle beetle.
