= Heterelmis obscura =

Scientific classification
- Kingdom: Animalia
- Phylum: Arthropoda
- Class: Insecta
- Order: Coleoptera
- Suborder: Polyphaga
- Infraorder: Elateriformia
- Family: Elmidae
- Genus: Heterelmis
- Species: H. obscura

Binomial name
- Heterelmis obscura Sharp, 1882

Species of beetle

Heterelmis obscura is a species of riffle beetle in the family Elmidae. It is found in Central America and South America.
