= Optioservus divergens =

Scientific classification
- Kingdom: Animalia
- Phylum: Arthropoda
- Class: Insecta
- Order: Coleoptera
- Suborder: Polyphaga
- Infraorder: Elateriformia
- Family: Elmidae
- Genus: Optioservus
- Species: O. divergens

Binomial name
- Optioservus divergens (LeConte, 1874)

Synonyms
- Elmis divergens LeConte, 1874; Elmis pecosensis Fall, 1907; Optioservus pecosensis (Fall, 1907)

Species of beetle

Optioservus divergens is a species of riffle beetle in the family Elmidae. It is found in North America.
