= Macrelmis moesta =

Scientific classification
- Domain: Eukaryota
- Kingdom: Animalia
- Phylum: Arthropoda
- Class: Insecta
- Order: Coleoptera
- Suborder: Polyphaga
- Infraorder: Elateriformia
- Family: Elmidae
- Genus: Macrelmis
- Species: M. moesta

Binomial name
- Macrelmis moesta (Horn, 1870)

Synonyms
- Elmis moestus Horn, 1870

Species of beetle

Macrelmis moesta is a species of riffle beetle in the family Elmidae. It is found in North America.
