= Optioservus phaeus =

Scientific classification
- Kingdom: Animalia
- Phylum: Arthropoda
- Class: Insecta
- Order: Coleoptera
- Suborder: Polyphaga
- Infraorder: Elateriformia
- Family: Elmidae
- Genus: Optioservus
- Species: O. phaeus

Binomial name
- Optioservus phaeus White, 1978

Species of beetle

Optioservus phaeus, the Scott optioservus riffle beetle, is a species of riffle beetle in the family Elmidae. It is only found in North America, specifically at Lake Scott State Park in Scott County, Kansas.
