= Stenelmis calida =

Scientific classification
- Kingdom: Animalia
- Phylum: Arthropoda
- Class: Insecta
- Order: Coleoptera
- Suborder: Polyphaga
- Infraorder: Elateriformia
- Family: Elmidae
- Genus: Stenelmis
- Species: S. calida

Binomial name
- Stenelmis calida Chandler, 1949

Species of beetle

Stenelmis calida, also known as the Devil's Hole warm spring riffle beetle, is a species of riffle beetle in the family Elmidae endemic to southern Nevada in the United States.

== Description ==
Identification can rely on geographic distribution due to endemism. Adults are most similar to Stenelmis moapa but differ in having a wider pronotum with a distinctly humped lateral profile, broader elytra, a shorter fifth tarsomere, and distinct genital morphology in males.

Adults measure about 3.0–3.4 mm in length. The body is elongate with nearly parallel sides. The elytra are dark brown, while most of the remaining body is covered in dense gray-green hairs; the mouthparts, antennae, tarsi, and tip of the abdomen lack this covering. Antennae are short and yellowish in color.

The pronotum is slightly longer than wide, widest toward the rear, with a distinct median groove and paired depressions near the scutellum; raised lateral tubercles are present. Elytra are unmarked, with deep punctures and prominent raised intervals near the base. The legs are reddish, and the terminal tarsal segment is enlarged and elongated, particularly on the fore and middle legs.

Females are similar in size and appearance but lack the tibial swelling found in males. Larvae are elongate, with an enlarged prothorax and a tapered posterior abdominal segment ending in a truncate apex with small marginal spines. The larval antennae are two-segmented, and the operculum is relatively short.

Adult wings are reduced and nonfunctional in both sexes.

== Ecology ==
Adults and larvae feed on algal growth and organic debris.

== Habitat and distribution ==
Stenelmis calida is endemic to southern Nevada and occurs in the Ash Meadows National Wildlife Refuge. Historically, it was known only from Devil's Hole, but additional confirmed localities include nearby warm springs (Indian Spring, Point of Rock, North and South Scruggs Springs, Marsh Spring, Bloody Gulch).

Population size at Devil's Hole is unknown, and the largest documented series is the type series, consisting of at least 131 specimens.

The species inhabits warm spring systems, occurring in flowing sections over pebble- to cobble-dominated substrates.

== Conservation ==
Stenelmis calida faces risks from habitat reduction and deterioration linked to regional groundwater extraction for development, as well as pressures associated with climate change and nonnative species.
