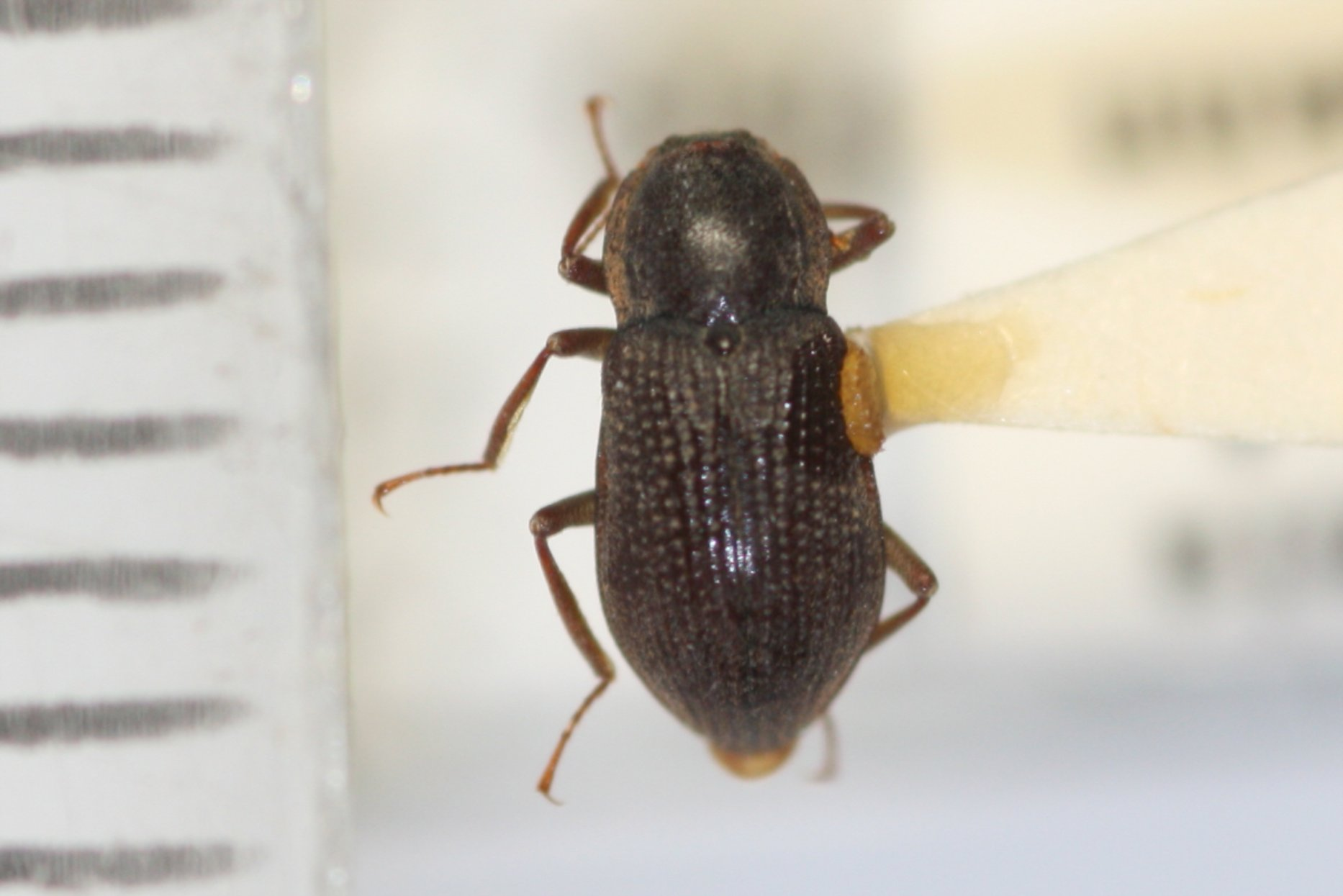

Scientific classification
- Kingdom: Animalia
- Phylum: Arthropoda
- Class: Insecta
- Order: Coleoptera
- Suborder: Polyphaga
- Infraorder: Elateriformia
- Family: Elmidae
- Tribe: Elmini
- Genus: Macrelmis; Motschulsky, 1859

Synonyms
- Elsianus Sharp, 1882

= Macrelmis =

Genus of beetles

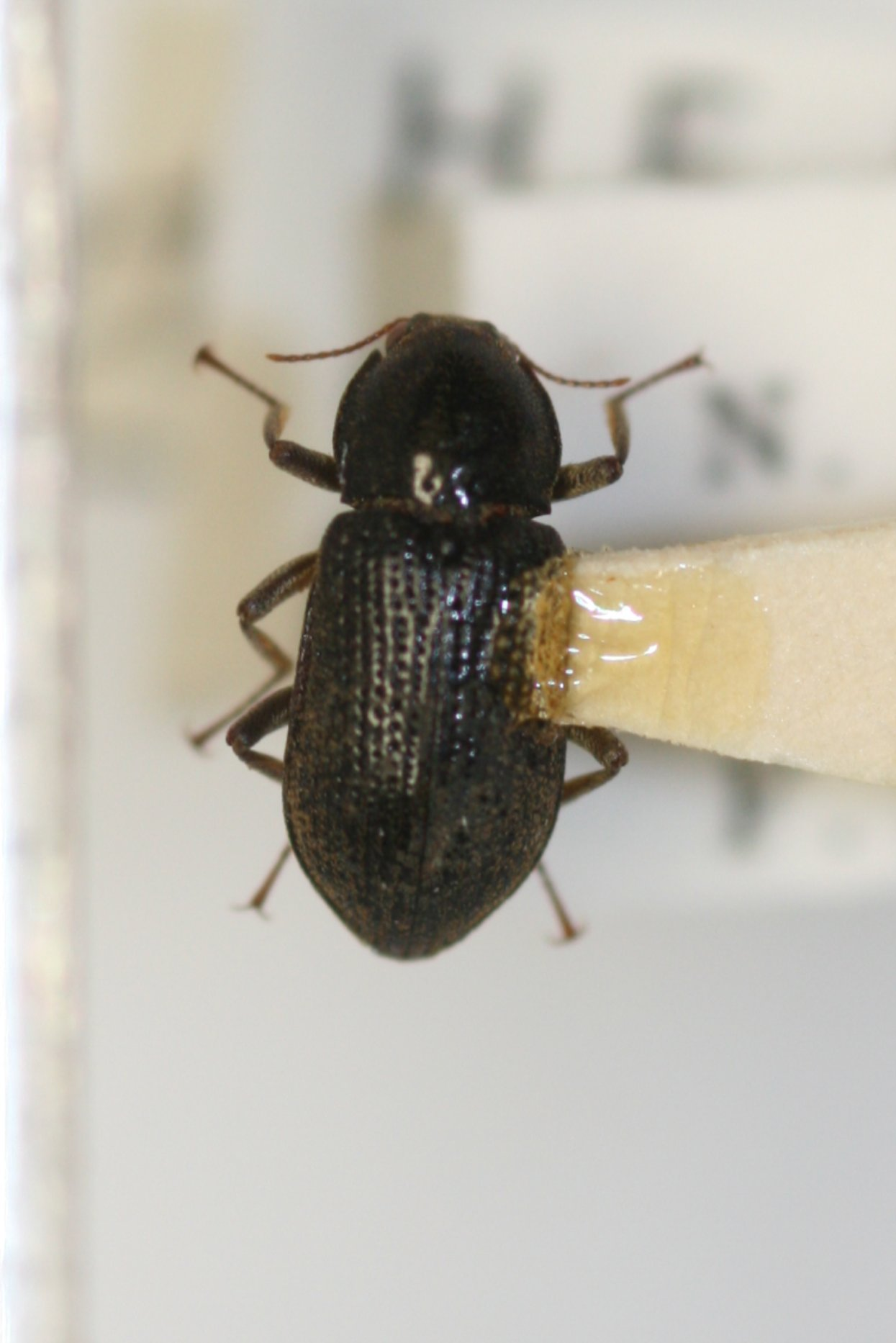
Macrelmis

Macrelmis is a genus of riffle beetles in the family Elmidae. There are at least three described species in Macrelmis.

== Species ==
- Macrelmis moesta (Horn, 1870)
- Macrelmis shoemakei (Brown, 1971)
- Macrelmis texana (Schaeffer, 1911)
