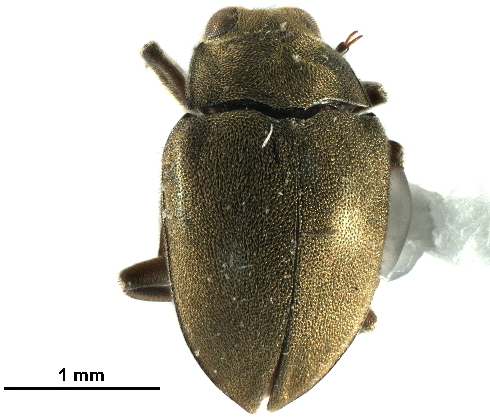

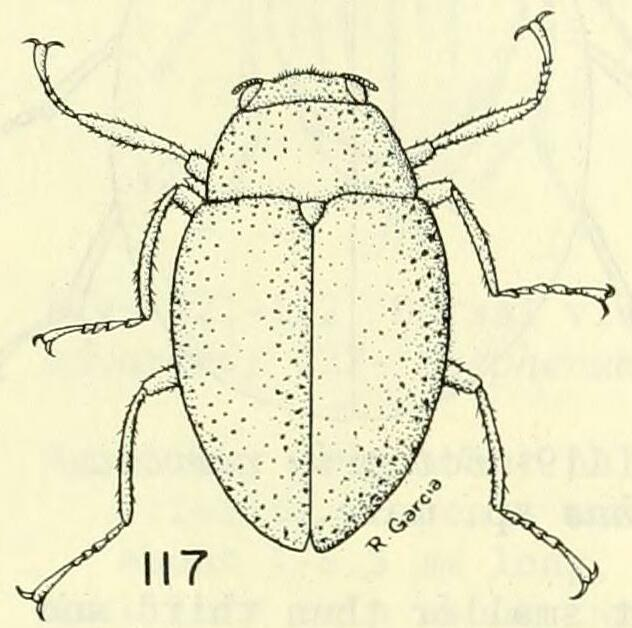
- Specimen and drawing of Lutrochus luteus

Scientific classification
- Kingdom: Animalia
- Phylum: Arthropoda
- Clade: Pancrustacea
- Class: Insecta
- Order: Coleoptera
- Suborder: Polyphaga
- Infraorder: Elateriformia
- Superfamily: Byrrhoidea
- Family: Lutrochidae; Kasap & Crowson, 1975
- Genus: Lutrochus; Erichson, 1847

Species
- Lutrochus arizonicus Lutrochus laticeps Lutrochus luteus, among others

= Lutrochus =

Family of beetles

Lutrochidae is a family of water beetles with a single genus Lutrochus sometimes known as "Travertine beetles". There are around 21 species native to the Americas from the southern United States to Brazil.

They are distinguished by their ovate bodies, 2–6 mm long and yellowish in color, and short antennae in which the first two antennomeres are longer than the others. The larvae are elongate, 4–10 mm in length, with short but well-developed legs.

The adults have a bubble of air held in place by hairs.

The adults and larvae are associated with submerged old and rotting wood found in shallow, fast flowing streams.
