= Optioservus browni =

Scientific classification
- Domain: Eukaryota
- Kingdom: Animalia
- Phylum: Arthropoda
- Class: Insecta
- Order: Coleoptera
- Suborder: Polyphaga
- Infraorder: Elateriformia
- Family: Elmidae
- Genus: Optioservus
- Species: O. browni

Binomial name
- Optioservus browni White, 1978

Species of beetle

Optioservus browni is a species in the family Elmidae ("riffle beetles"), in the suborder Polyphaga ("water, rove, scarab, long-horned, leaf and snout beetles"). The species is known generally as the "Brown's optioservus riffle beetle". It is found in North America.
