= Stenelmis cheryl =

Scientific classification
- Domain: Eukaryota
- Kingdom: Animalia
- Phylum: Arthropoda
- Class: Insecta
- Order: Coleoptera
- Suborder: Polyphaga
- Infraorder: Elateriformia
- Family: Elmidae
- Genus: Stenelmis
- Species: S. cheryl

Binomial name
- Stenelmis cheryl Brown, 1987

Species of beetle

Stenelmis cheryl, or Cheryl's riffle beetle, is a species of riffle beetle in the family Elmidae. It is found in Central America and North America.
