= Stenelmis concinna =

Scientific classification
- Kingdom: Animalia
- Phylum: Arthropoda
- Class: Insecta
- Order: Coleoptera
- Suborder: Polyphaga
- Infraorder: Elateriformia
- Family: Elmidae
- Genus: Stenelmis
- Species: S. concinna

Binomial name
- Stenelmis concinna Sanderson, 1938

Species of beetle

Stenelmis concinna is a species of riffle beetle in the family Elmidae. It is found in North America.
