= Dubiraphia browni =

Scientific classification
- Domain: Eukaryota
- Kingdom: Animalia
- Phylum: Arthropoda
- Class: Insecta
- Order: Coleoptera
- Suborder: Polyphaga
- Infraorder: Elateriformia
- Family: Elmidae
- Genus: Dubiraphia
- Species: D. browni

Binomial name
- Dubiraphia browni Hilsenhoff, 1973

Species of beetle

Dubiraphia browni is a species in the family Elmidae ("riffle beetles"), in the order Coleoptera ("beetles"). Dubiraphia browni is found in North America.
