= Dubiraphia harleyi =

Scientific classification
- Domain: Eukaryota
- Kingdom: Animalia
- Phylum: Arthropoda
- Class: Insecta
- Order: Coleoptera
- Suborder: Polyphaga
- Infraorder: Elateriformia
- Family: Elmidae
- Genus: Dubiraphia
- Species: D. harleyi

Binomial name
- Dubiraphia harleyi Barr, 1984

Species of beetle

Dubiraphia harleyi is a species of riffle beetle in the family Elmidae. It is found in North America.
