= Zaitzevia thermae =

Warm springs zaitzevian riffle beetle

Scientific classification
- Domain: Eukaryota
- Kingdom: Animalia
- Phylum: Arthropoda
- Class: Insecta
- Order: Coleoptera
- Suborder: Polyphaga
- Infraorder: Elateriformia
- Family: Elmidae
- Genus: Zaitzevia
- Species: Z. thermae

Binomial name
- Zaitzevia thermae (Hatch, 1938)

Synonyms
- Macronychus thermae Hatch, 1938

Species of beetle

Zaitzevia thermae, also called the warm springs zaitzevian riffle beetle, is a flightless, wingless small beetle found in aquatic habitats in Montana.

== Description ==
The species is distinguished from other elmids by its 8–segmented antennae, its side–lying and silk like elytra, pimply abdominal sternum, and other minor genetic differences. In general, but not always, the more slender form of Z. thermae can visually differentiate it from its sister species, Z. parvula.

== Taxonomy ==
Zaitzevia thermae is sometimes treated as a synonym of or subspecies to Z. parvula; though this appears to be because a morphology report by Hooter in 1991 went unpublished and widely unread, which concluded that Z. thermae was its own distinct species and not a subspecies of another member of the genus. Due to this and the fact that the species is appropriately listed by the US Fish and Wildlife Service, Z. thermae is generally considered its own unique species.

== Distribution ==
Zaitzevia thermae has a very limited range of less than 35 square meters in one specific location. They are known from only a handful of occurrences around a small warm spring along Bridger Creek, near Bozeman, Montana, on land owned by the US Fish and Wildlife Service. The primary threat to the species was the massive reduction of its habitat by human intervention, namely water collection infrastructure at the spring. In addition, fill in and around the spring further reduced the beetle's feeding grounds and habitat. The species is classified as N1, or critically imperiled, by NatureServe, but threats to its longevity have largely been eliminated, and drastic change in the size of its population in the next ten years is unlikely.

Another riffle beetle, Microcylloepus browni, has an almost identical distribution, endemic to the warm springs less than 300 meters down stream. Z. parvula, the sister species of Z. thermae, has a distribution that actually overlaps that of the latter species, and has an almost nationwide distribution in the United States.

== Ecology ==
The species is found only in warm springs, in surface flowing water from 60–84 degrees Fahrenheit. The species attaches itself to the underside of rocks or clings to watercress and feeds on algae on the gravel bottom of the spring using their mandibles. They are non–migratory, and their lack of wings makes their dispersal opportunities limited, but are most likely long–lived, with lifespans of greater than a year.
