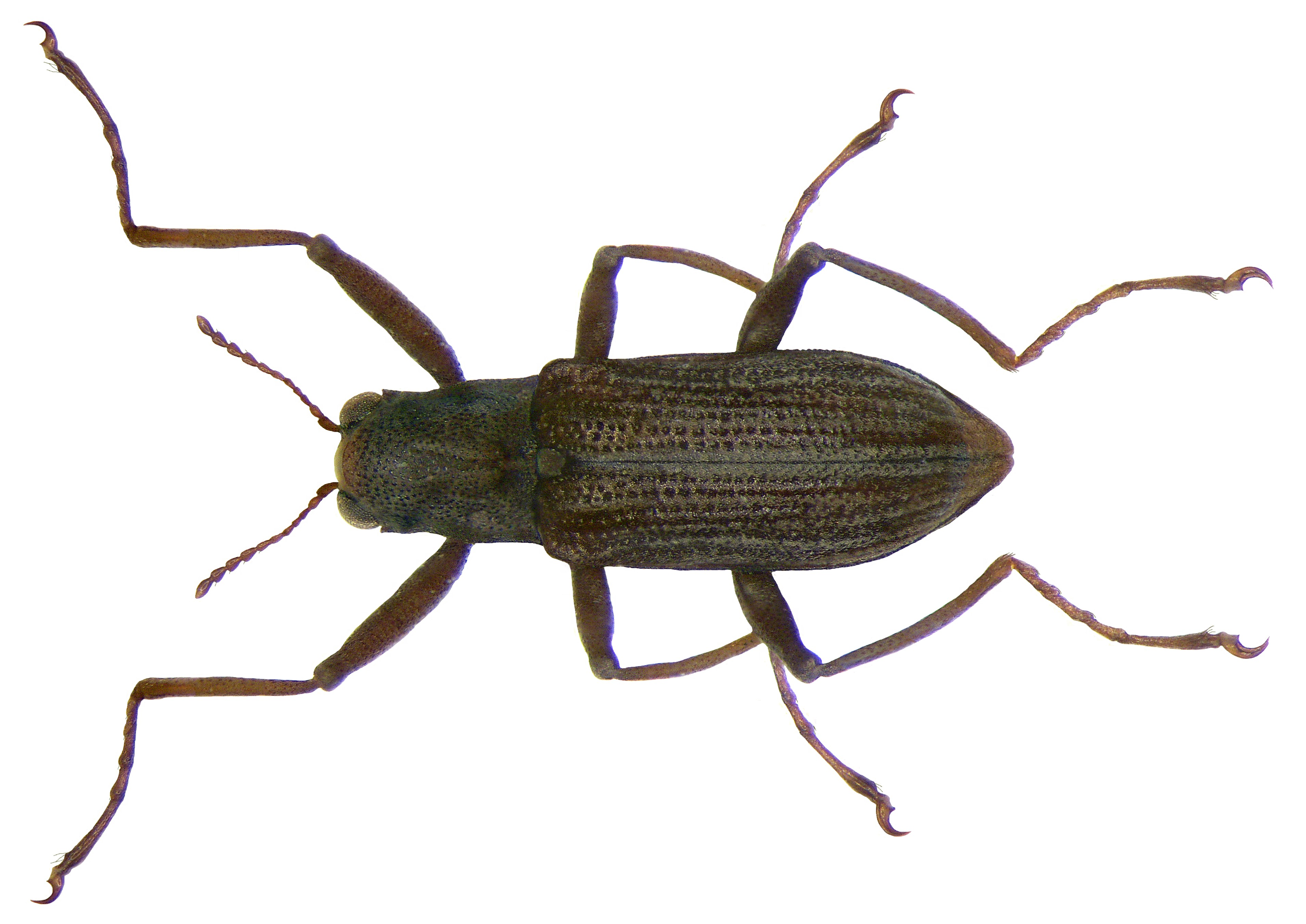
- Ordobrevia constricta

Scientific classification
- Kingdom: Animalia
- Phylum: Arthropoda
- Class: Insecta
- Order: Coleoptera
- Suborder: Polyphaga
- Infraorder: Elateriformia
- Family: Elmidae
- Subfamily: Elminae
- Tribe: Elmini
- Genus: Ordobrevia; Sanderson, 1953

= Ordobrevia =

Genus of beetles

Ordobrevia is a genus of riffle beetles in the family Elmidae. There are about 11 described species in Ordobrevia.

== Species ==
These 11 species belong to the genus Ordobrevia:

- Ordobrevia amamiensis (Nomura, 1957)
- Ordobrevia communis Delève, 1968
- Ordobrevia constricta Delève, 1968
- Ordobrevia flavolineata Delève, 1973
- Ordobrevia fletcheri (Champion, 1923)
- Ordobrevia foveicollis (Schönfeldt, 1888)
- Ordobrevia gotoi Nomura, 1959
- Ordobrevia longicollis (Pic, 1923)
- Ordobrevia nubifer (Fall, 1901)
- Ordobrevia nubifera (Fall, 1901)
- Ordobrevia reflexicollis (Bollow, 1940)
