= Ordobrevia flavolineata =

Scientific classification
- Kingdom: Animalia
- Phylum: Arthropoda
- Class: Insecta
- Order: Coleoptera
- Suborder: Polyphaga
- Infraorder: Elateriformia
- Family: Elmidae
- Genus: Ordobrevia
- Species: O. flavolineata

Binomial name
- Ordobrevia flavolineata (Delève, 1973)

Synonyms
- Stenelmis flavolineata Delève, 1973; Ordobrevia fletcheri flavolineata Delève, 1973

Species of beetle

Ordobrevia flavolineata is a species of riffle beetle found in Sri Lanka.
