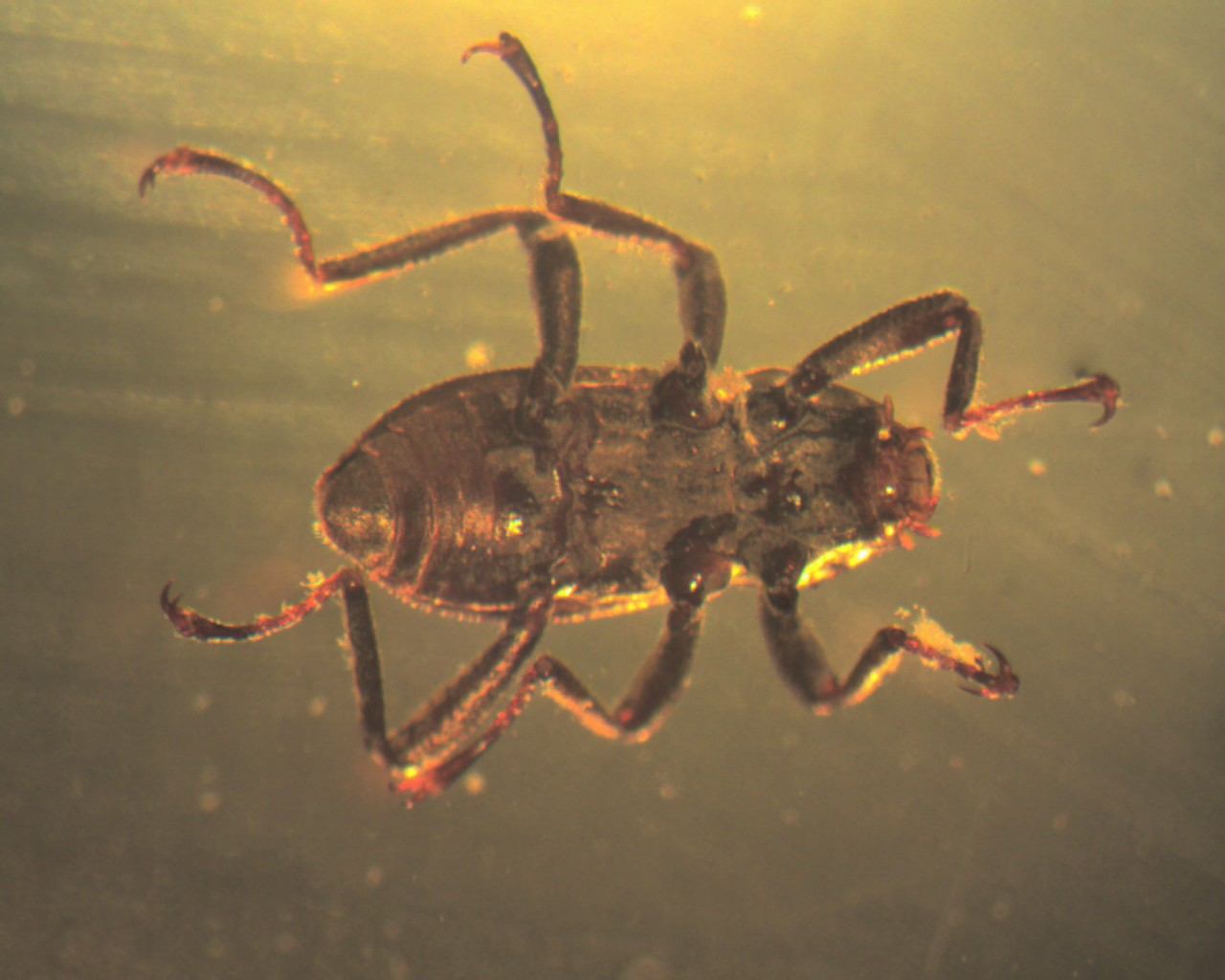

Scientific classification
- Kingdom: Animalia
- Phylum: Arthropoda
- Class: Insecta
- Order: Coleoptera
- Suborder: Polyphaga
- Infraorder: Elateriformia
- Family: Elmidae
- Tribe: Macronychini
- Genus: Macronychus; Mueller, 1806

= Macronychus =

Genus of beetles

Macronychus is a genus of riffle beetles in the family Elmidae. There are about 11 described species in Macronychus.

== Species ==
These 11 species belong to the genus Macronychus:

- Macronychus glabratus Say, 1825
- Macronychus indicus Hinton, 1940
- Macronychus jaechi Ciampor & Kodada, 1998
- Macronychus jendeki Ciampor & Kodada, 1998
- Macronychus kubani Ciampor & Kodada, 1998
- Macronychus levanidovae Lafer, 1980
- Macronychus quadrituberculatus Müller, 1806
- Macronychus reticulatus Ciampor & Kodada, 1998
- Macronychus sulcatus Ciampor & Kodada, 1998
- Macronychus ultimus Ciampor & Kodada, 1998
- Macronychus vietnamensis Delève, 1968
