= Zaitzevia tsushimana =

Scientific classification
- Domain: Eukaryota
- Kingdom: Animalia
- Phylum: Arthropoda
- Class: Insecta
- Order: Coleoptera
- Suborder: Polyphaga
- Infraorder: Elateriformia
- Family: Elmidae
- Genus: Zaitzevia
- Species: Z. tsushimana

Binomial name
- Zaitzevia tsushimana Nomura, 1963

Species of beetle

Zaitzevia tsushimana is a small, wingless beetle in the family Elmidae. The species is found in the Nagasaki Prefecture of Japan.

== Description ==
The species's head is black and its elytra are also normally black but can also have a purple and brown hue. Its claws and mouth parts are brown, and the surface of its underside is dark brown.

The species is most similar to Zaitzevia rivalis, but can be told apart by its smaller body, triangular scutellum, and the sparse serration of its elytra.
