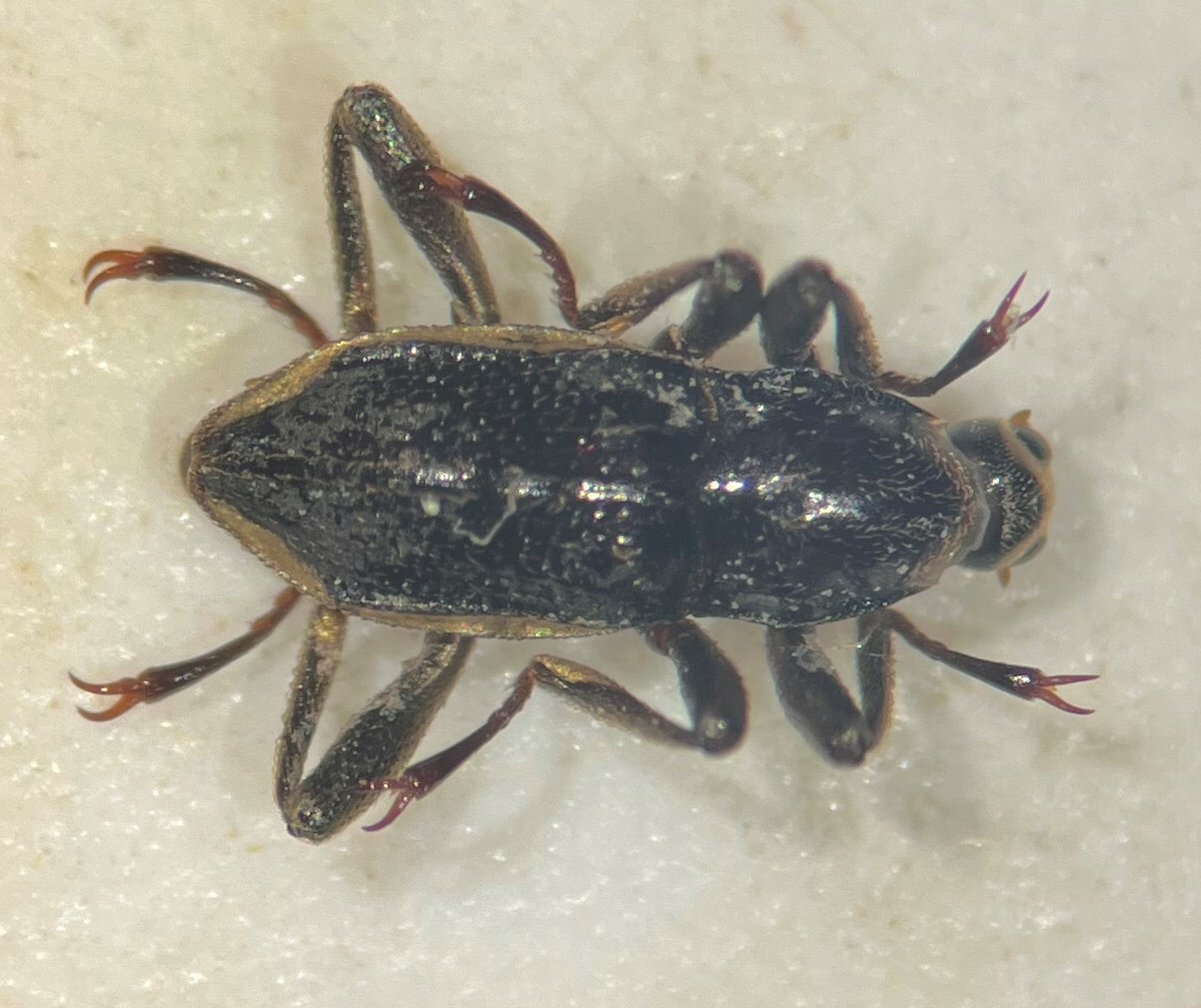
- Macroncychus glabratus

Scientific classification
- Domain: Eukaryota
- Kingdom: Animalia
- Phylum: Arthropoda
- Class: Insecta
- Order: Coleoptera
- Suborder: Polyphaga
- Infraorder: Elateriformia
- Family: Elmidae
- Genus: Macronychus
- Species: M. glabratus

Binomial name
- Macronychus glabratus Say, 1825

Synonyms
- Macronychus lateralis Melsheimer, 1844

= Macronychus glabratus =

Species of beetle

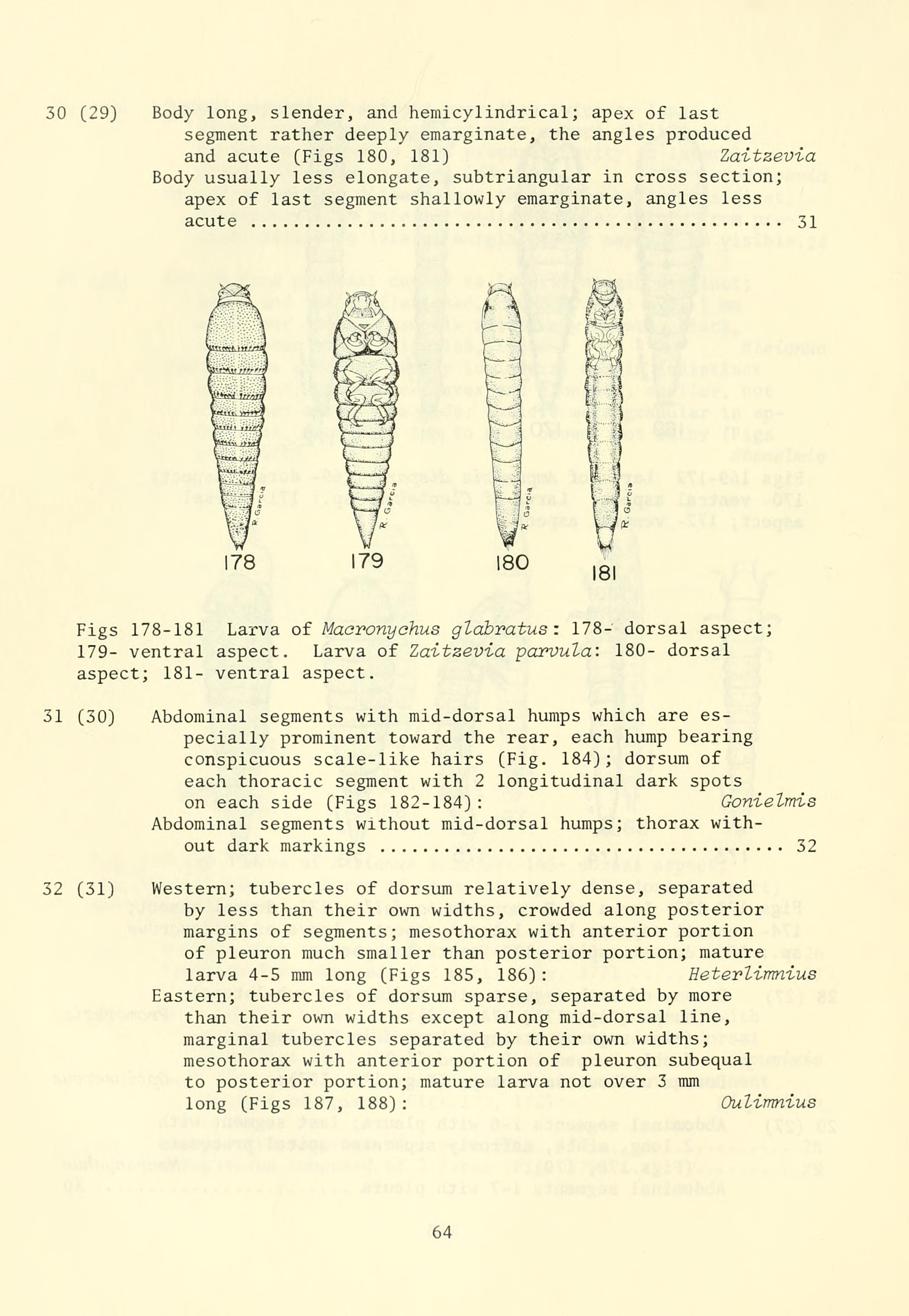
Page with M. glabratus larvae (left two images, dorsal and ventral aspects) compared with Zaitzevia parvula larvae (right two images, dorsal and ventral aspects)

Macronychus glabratus is a species of riffle beetle in the family Elmidae. It is found in North America.
