= Ordobrevia nubifera =

Scientific classification
- Domain: Eukaryota
- Kingdom: Animalia
- Phylum: Arthropoda
- Class: Insecta
- Order: Coleoptera
- Suborder: Polyphaga
- Infraorder: Elateriformia
- Family: Elmidae
- Genus: Ordobrevia
- Species: O. nubifera

Binomial name
- Ordobrevia nubifera (Fall, 1901)

Synonyms
- Stenelmis nubifera Fall, 1901

Species of beetle

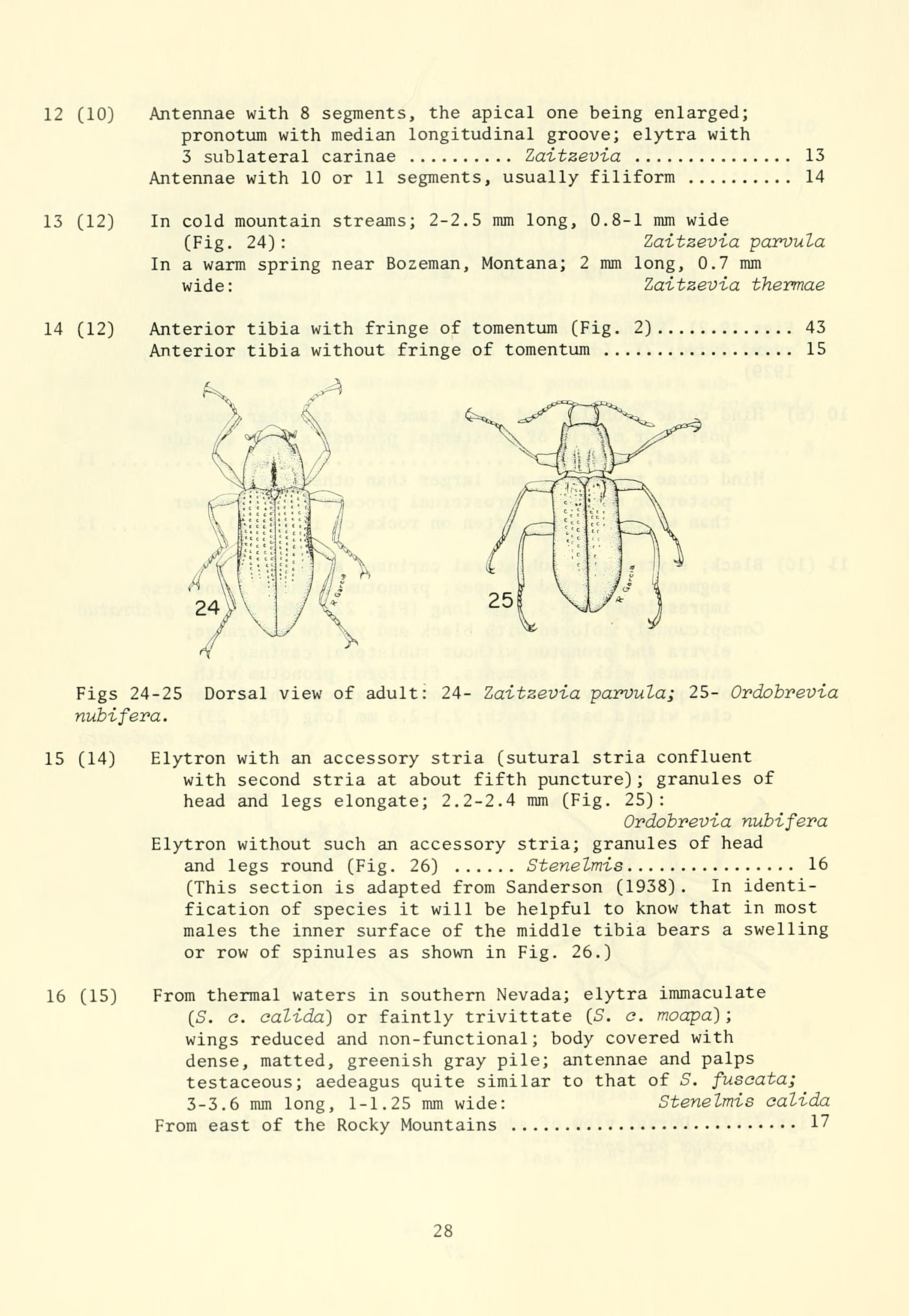
Page with adult O. nubifera (right) compared with adult Zaitzevia parvula (left)

Ordobrevia nubifera is a species of riffle beetle in the family Elmidae. It is found in North America.
