= Ordobrevia fletcheri =

Scientific classification
- Kingdom: Animalia
- Phylum: Arthropoda
- Class: Insecta
- Order: Coleoptera
- Suborder: Polyphaga
- Infraorder: Elateriformia
- Family: Elmidae
- Genus: Ordobrevia
- Species: O. fletcheri

Binomial name
- Ordobrevia fletcheri (Champion, 1923)

Synonyms
- Stenelmis fletcheri Champion, 1923

Species of beetle

Ordobrevia fletcheri is a species of riffle beetle found in Sri Lanka.
