= Zaitzevia elongata =

Scientific classification
- Kingdom: Animalia
- Phylum: Arthropoda
- Class: Insecta
- Order: Coleoptera
- Suborder: Polyphaga
- Infraorder: Elateriformia
- Family: Elmidae
- Genus: Zaitzevia
- Species: Z. elongata

Binomial name
- Zaitzevia elongata Nomura, 1962

Species of riffle beetle

Zaitzevia elongata is a species of riffle beetle which is wingless and flightless. It is found on several of the Ryukyu Islands in Japan in the gravel substrate of streams.

== Description ==
=== Larvae ===
The mature larvae of Zaitzevia elongata have a body length of approximately 4 millimeters (mm) long and are black or dark brown with orange appendages. Their bodies are longer than they are wide, and gradually become more narrow from the thorax (center) to the apex (front). When viewed from the side, the larvae form a rough semi-circular shape. The spiracles, which are openings that allow air to enter the trachea, are found on the mesothorax and the first eight abdominal segments. Their dorsal and ventral (top and bottom) surfaces are not smooth, and have flat granules (bumps) and various setae (bristles).

The head of the larvae are visible from above and is clearly separated from the front segment of the thorax, the prothorax. It is about as long as it is wide. The clypeus (frontal tooth) is transverse and lacks spines on either side. The eyes are large, but lack the lens of stemmata. Each antenna has three antennomeres (segments).

The thorax of the larvae are not serrated on the sides, and the dorsum has similar granules and setae to the rest of the body. The segment of the thorax closest to the head, the prothorax, is wider than it is long and is twice as long as the middle segment of the thorax, the mesothorax. Along the ventral side of the prothorax are seven sclerites, while along the ventral side of the meso- and metathorax there are five sclerites.

The larval abdomen has nine segments, all of which have the same type of granules and setae to the rest of the body. The first eight segments are of similar size and form, all having pleural sclerites. The last segment is longer than it is wide, and gradually narrows to an apex at the rear of the beetle. The apex is notched and ventrally flat, having opercular claws and anal gills.

=== Adults ===
The male genitalia of Zaitzevia elongata is about 2.2 times as long as the median lobe, and the parameres are membraneous.

== Distribution and habitat ==
Zaitzevia elongata is found in the Ryukyu Islands of Japan. Specimens have been collected from the islands of Amami Ōshima, Tokunoshima, and Okinawa.

== Ecology ==
Larvae of the species have been recorded as residing among the moss species Fissidens nagasakinus.
