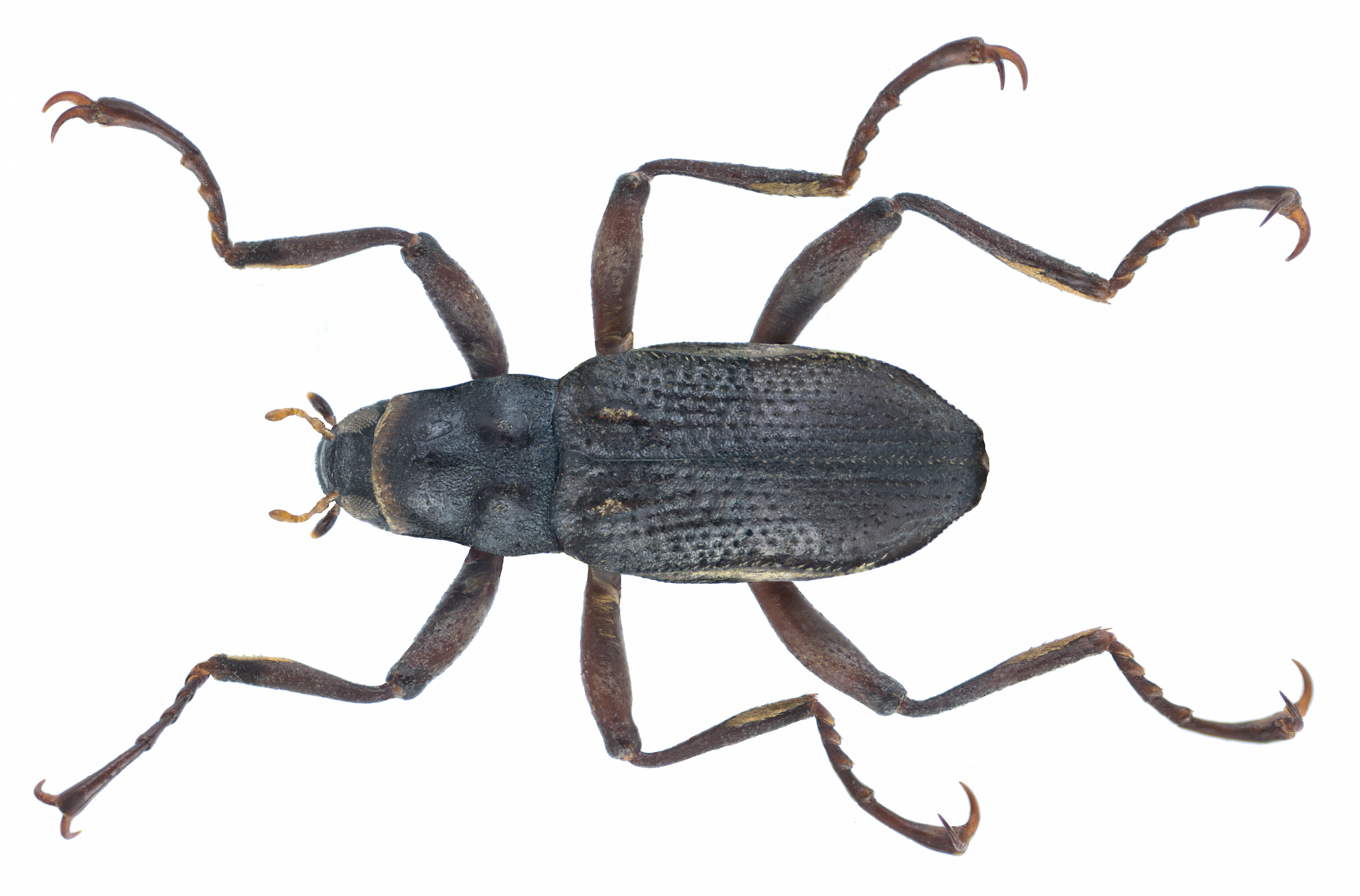
- Macronychus quadrituberculatus

Scientific classification
- Domain: Eukaryota
- Kingdom: Animalia
- Phylum: Arthropoda
- Class: Insecta
- Order: Coleoptera
- Suborder: Polyphaga
- Infraorder: Elateriformia
- Family: Elmidae
- Subfamily: Elminae
- Tribe: Macronychini; Gistel, 1848

= Macronychini =

Tribe of beetles

Macronychini is a tribe of riffle beetles in the family Elmidae. There are more than 20 genera and 80 described species in Macronychini.

== Genera ==
These 22 genera belong to the tribe Macronychini:

- Aulacosolus Jäch & Boukal, 1997
- Cuspidevia Jäch & Boukal, 1995
- Eonychius Jäch & Boukal, 1996
- Graphosolus Jäch & Kodada, 1996
- Haraldaria Jäch & Boukal, 1996
- Homalosolus Jäch & Kodada, 1996
- Indosolus Bollow, 1940
- Jilanzhunychus Jäch & Boukal, 1995
- Loxostirus Jäch & Kodada, 1996
- Macronevia Jäch & Boukal, 1996
- Macronychus Mueller, 1806
- Nesonychus Jäch & Boukal, 1997
- Okalia Kodada & Ciampor, 2003
- Paramacronychus Nomura, 1958
- Podonychus Jäch & Kodada, 1997
- Prionosolus Jäch & Kodada, 1997
- Rhopalonychus Jäch & Kodada, 1996
- Sinonychus Jäch & Boukal, 1995
- Urumaelmis Satô, 1963
- Vietelmis Delève, 1968
- Zaitzevia Champion, 1923
- Zaitzeviaria Nomura, 1959
