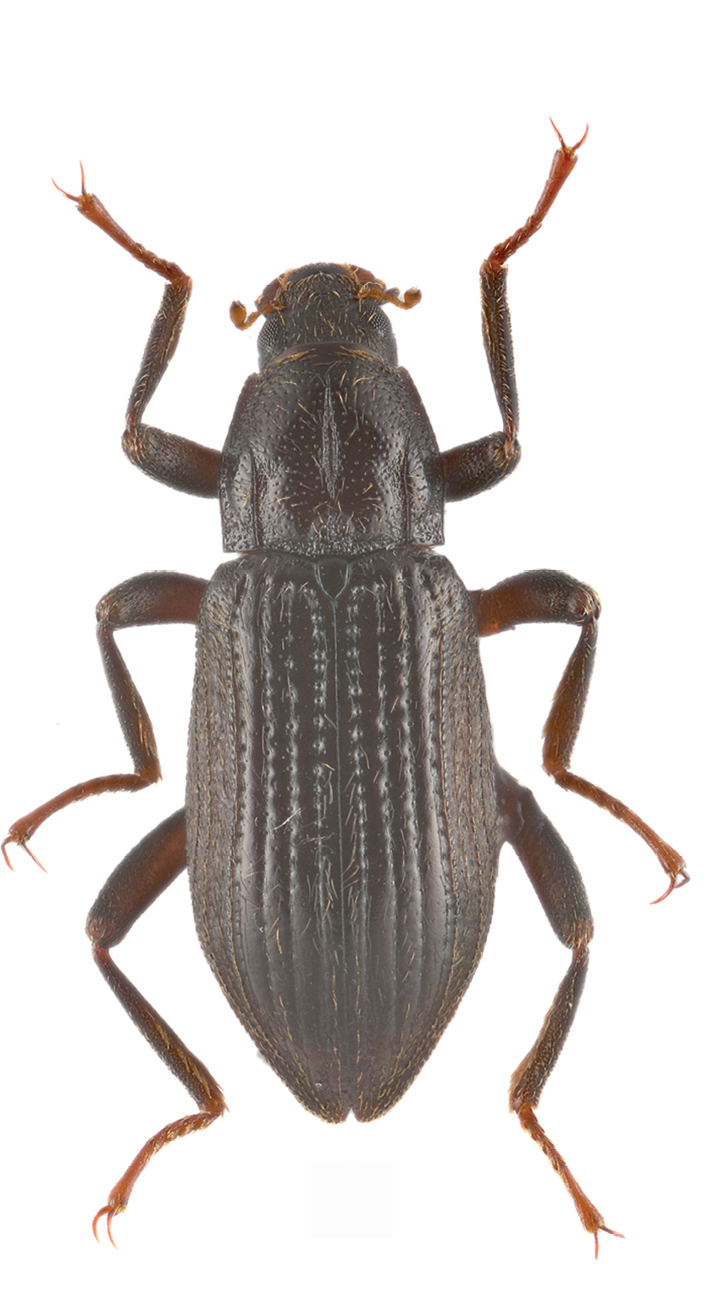

Scientific classification
- Kingdom: Animalia
- Phylum: Arthropoda
- Clade: Pancrustacea
- Class: Insecta
- Order: Coleoptera
- Suborder: Polyphaga
- Infraorder: Elateriformia
- Family: Elmidae
- Tribe: Macronychini
- Genus: Zaitzevia; Champion, 1923

Type species
- Zaitzevia solidicornis Champion, 1923

Species
- See text

Synonyms
- Awadoronus Kôno, 1934; Suzevia Brown, 2001

= Zaitzevia =

Genus of insects

Zaitzevia is a genus of riffle beetles in the family Elmidae. There are about 19 described species in Zaitzevia. The genus is named after the Russian entomologist Filipp Zaitsev (ru).

== Taxonomy ==
The genus Zaitzevia was originally described in 1923 by George Charles Champion, a British entomologist. Champion placed two species within the genus: Z. solidicornis, which he designated as the type species, and Z. acutangula. While Z. solidicornis remains the type species of the genus, Z. acutangula was later transferred to the genus Indosolus.

In 2001, American entomologist Harley Brown proposed dividing the genus into two subgenera in order to better represent the diversity of the genus. Subgenus Zaitzevia is represented by Z. solidicornis, while the new subgenus Suzevia is represented by Z. posthonia.

=== Species ===
The following 21 species are recognized as belonging to the genus Zaitzevia:

==== Currently accepted ====
- Zaitzevia aritai Satô, 1963
- Zaitzevia awana (Kôno, 1934)
- Zaitzevia babai Nomura, 1963
- Zaitzevia bhutanica Satô, 1977
- Zaitzevia chenzhitengi Jiang & Wang, 2020
- Zaitzevia elongata Nomura, 1962
- Zaitzevia formosana Nomura, 1963
- Zaitzevia malaisei Bollow, 1940
- Zaitzevia nitida Nomura, 1963
- Zaitzevia parallela Nomura, 1963
- Zaitzevia parallele Nomura, 1963
- Zaitzevia parvula (Horn, 1870)
- Zaitzevia pocsi Delève, 1968
- Zaitzevia posthonia Brown, 2001
- Zaitzevia rivalis Nomura, 1963
- Zaitzevia rufa Nomura & Baba, 1961
- Zaitzevia solidicornis Champion, 1923
- Zaitzevia thermae Hatch, 1938
- Zaitzevia tsushimana Nomura, 1963
- Zaitzevia xiongzichuni Jiang & Wang, 2020
- Zaitzevia yaeyamana Satô, 1963

==== Transferred ====
- Zaitzevia acutangula – to Indosolus
