= Zaitzevia parvula =

Scientific classification
- Domain: Eukaryota
- Kingdom: Animalia
- Phylum: Arthropoda
- Class: Insecta
- Order: Coleoptera
- Suborder: Polyphaga
- Infraorder: Elateriformia
- Family: Elmidae
- Genus: Zaitzevia
- Species: Z. parvula

Binomial name
- Zaitzevia parvula (Horn, 1870)

Species of beetle

Zaitzevia parvula is a species of riffle beetle in the family Elmidae. It is found in North America.

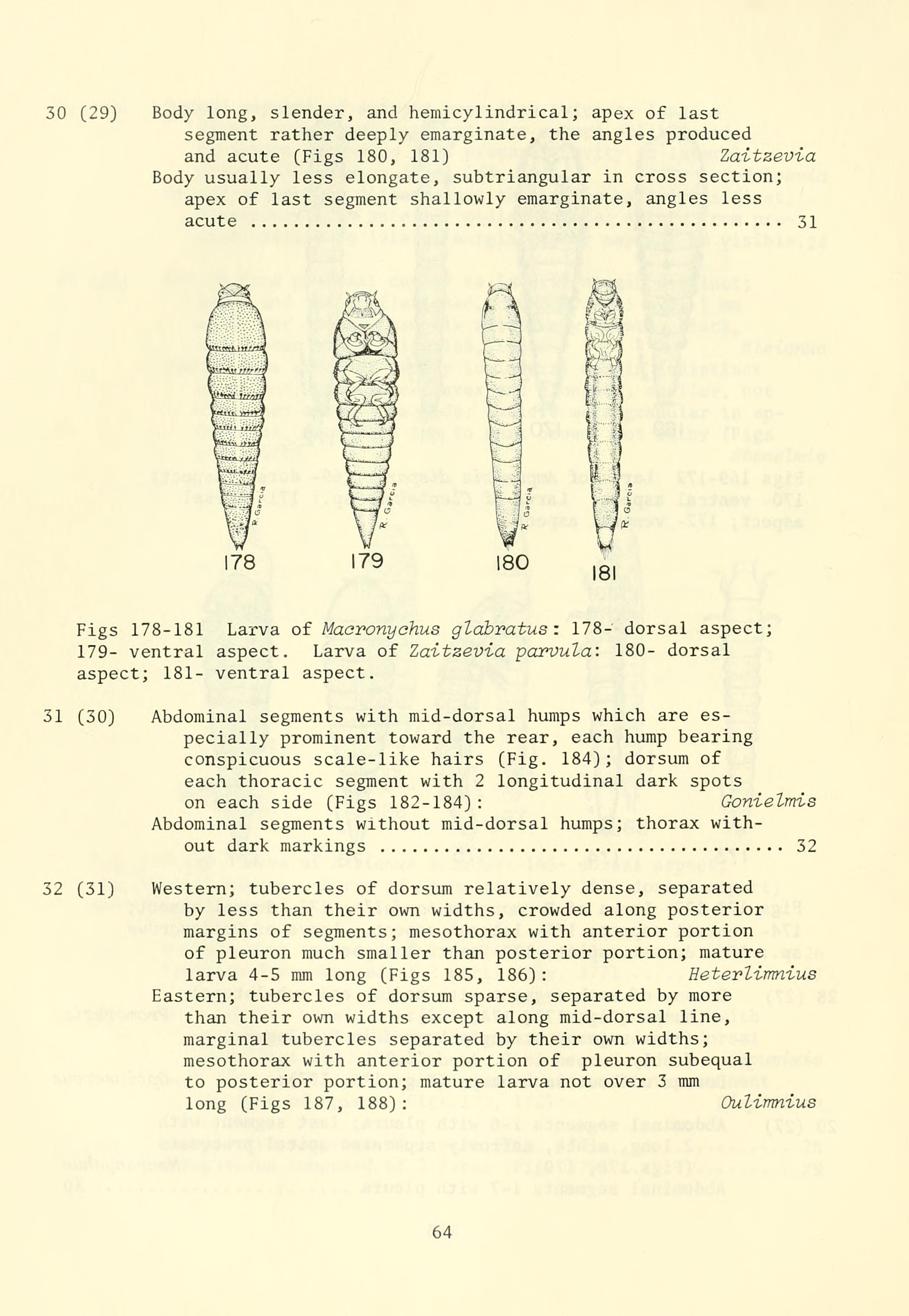
Page with Z. parvula larvae (right two images, dorsal and ventral aspects) compared with Macronychus glabratus larvae (left two images, dorsal and ventral aspects)

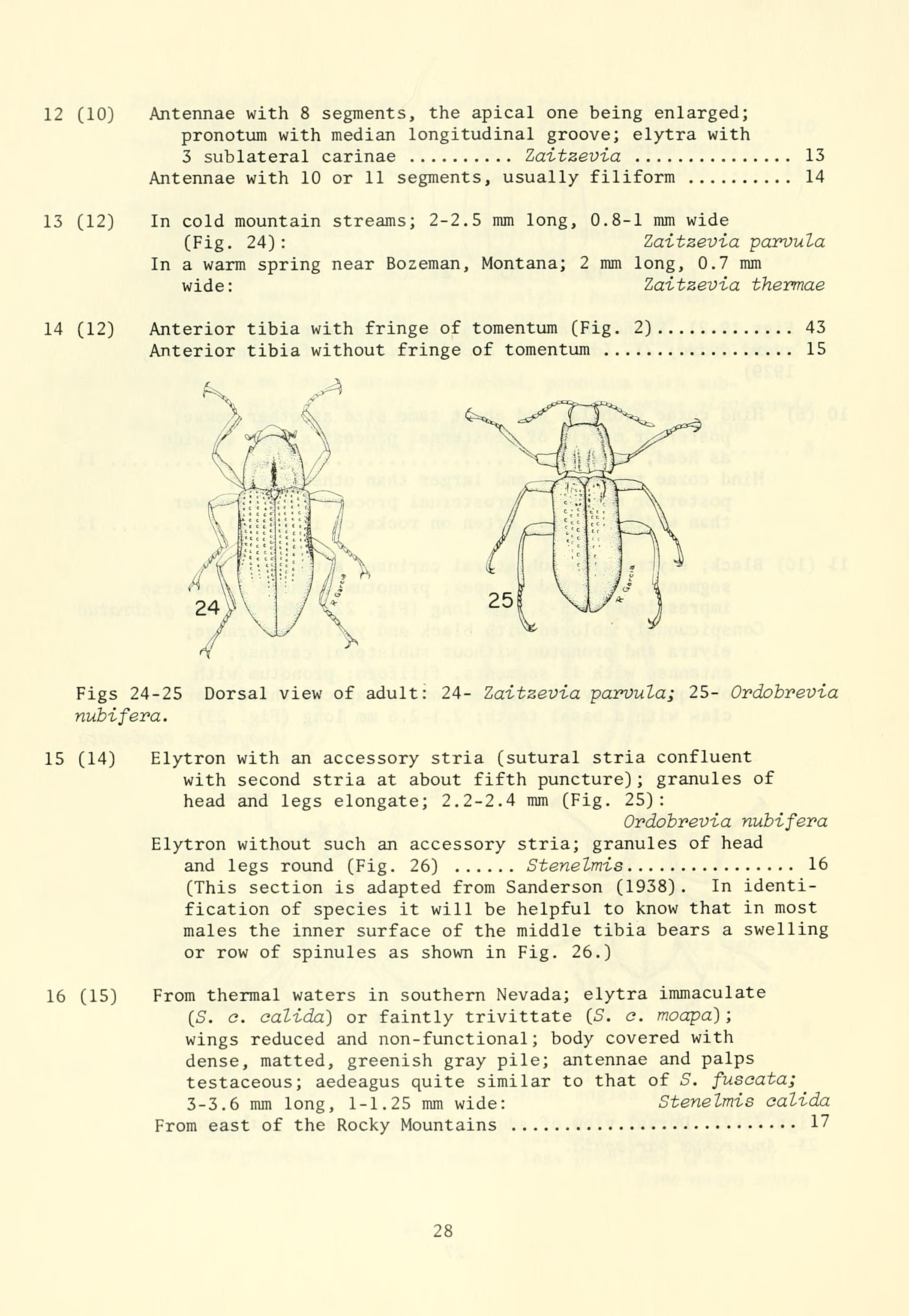
Page with adult Z. parvula (left) compared with adult Ordobrevia nubifera (right)

== Subspecies ==
These two subspecies belong to the species Zaitzevia parvula:

- Zaitzevia parvula parvula (Horn, 1870)
- Zaitzevia parvula thermae (Hatch, 1938)
