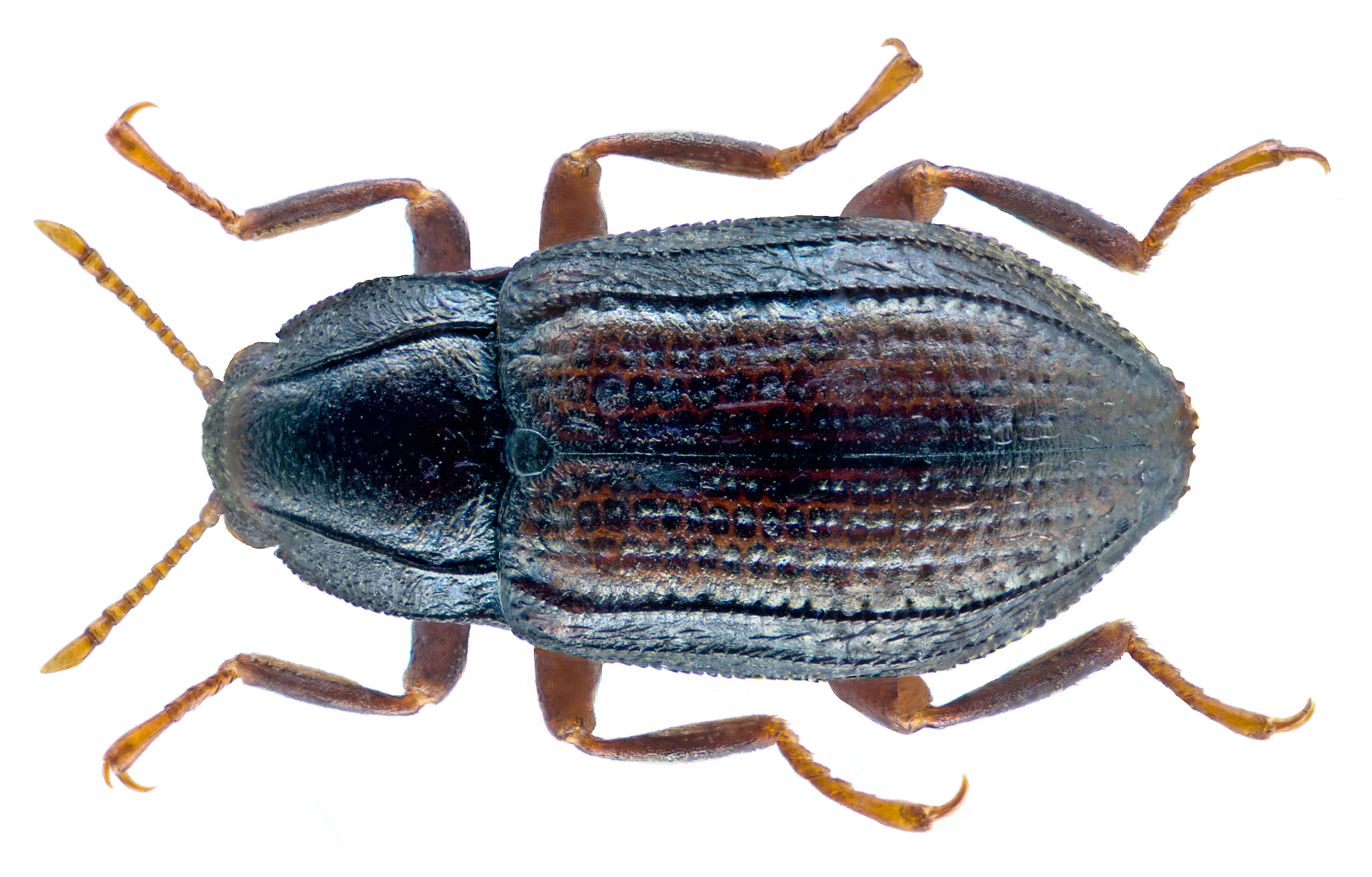
- Oulimnius tuberculatus

Scientific classification
- Domain: Eukaryota
- Kingdom: Animalia
- Phylum: Arthropoda
- Class: Insecta
- Order: Coleoptera
- Suborder: Polyphaga
- Infraorder: Elateriformia
- Family: Elmidae
- Subfamily: Elminae
- Tribe: Elmini
- Genus: Oulimnius des Gozis, 1886

= Oulimnius =

Genus of beetles

Oulimnius is a genus of riffle beetles in the family Elmidae. There are about 15 described species in Oulimnius.

== Species ==
These 15 species belong to the genus Oulimnius:

- Oulimnius aegyptiacus (Kuwert, 1890)
- Oulimnius bertrandi Berthélemy, 1964
- Oulimnius cyneticus Berthélemy, 1980
- Oulimnius echiinatus Berthélemy, 1979
- Oulimnius fuscipes (Reiche, 1879)
- Oulimnius hipponensis Berthélemy, 1979
- Oulimnius jaechi Hernando, Ribera & Aguilera, 1998
- Oulimnius latiusculus (LeConte, 1866)
- Oulimnius maurus Berthélemy, 1979
- Oulimnius nitidulus (Leconte, 1866)
- Oulimnius perezi (Sharp, 1872)
- Oulimnius reygassei (Peyerimhoff, 1929)
- Oulimnius troglodytes (Gyllenhal, 1827)
- Oulimnius tuberculatus (Müller, 1806)
- Oulimnius villosus Berthélemy, 1979
