= Oulimnius nitidulus =

Scientific classification
- Kingdom: Animalia
- Phylum: Arthropoda
- Clade: Pancrustacea
- Class: Insecta
- Order: Coleoptera
- Suborder: Polyphaga
- Infraorder: Elateriformia
- Family: Elmidae
- Genus: Oulimnius
- Species: O. nitidulus

Binomial name
- Oulimnius nitidulus (Leconte, 1866)

Synonyms
- Elmis nitidula LeConte, 1866

Species of beetle

Oulimnius nitidulus is a species of riffle beetle in the family Elmidae. It is found in North America.

Riffle beetles in this genus are aquatic insects. They are found in freshwater habitats, and they prefer locations with rocky substrates. They serve as food for other aquatic organisms.

The species tend to be found in cleaner streams and waters, and are therefore a potential indication of stream health.

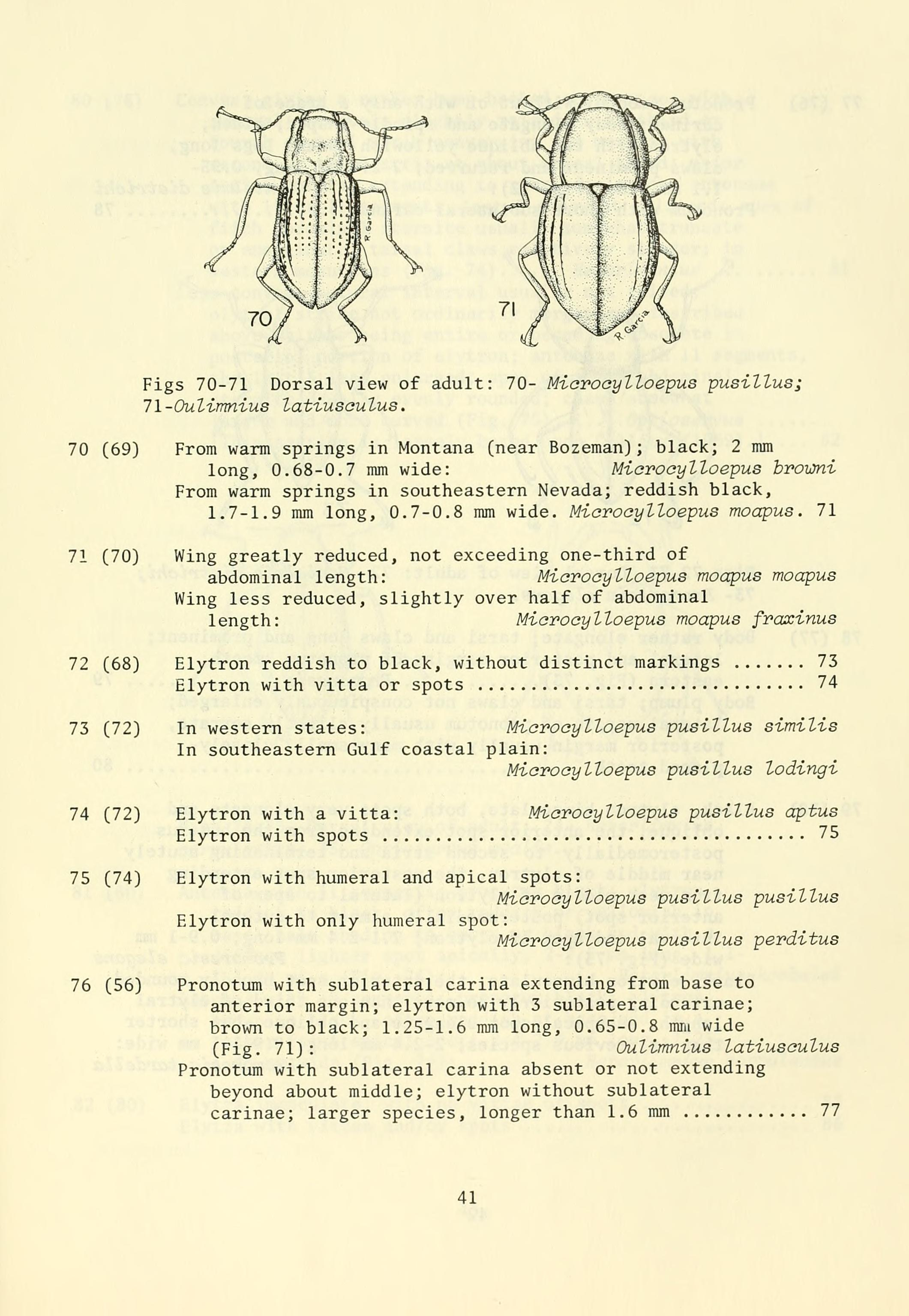
Aquatic dryopoid beetles (Coleoptera) of the United States (Page 41) BHL3286902
