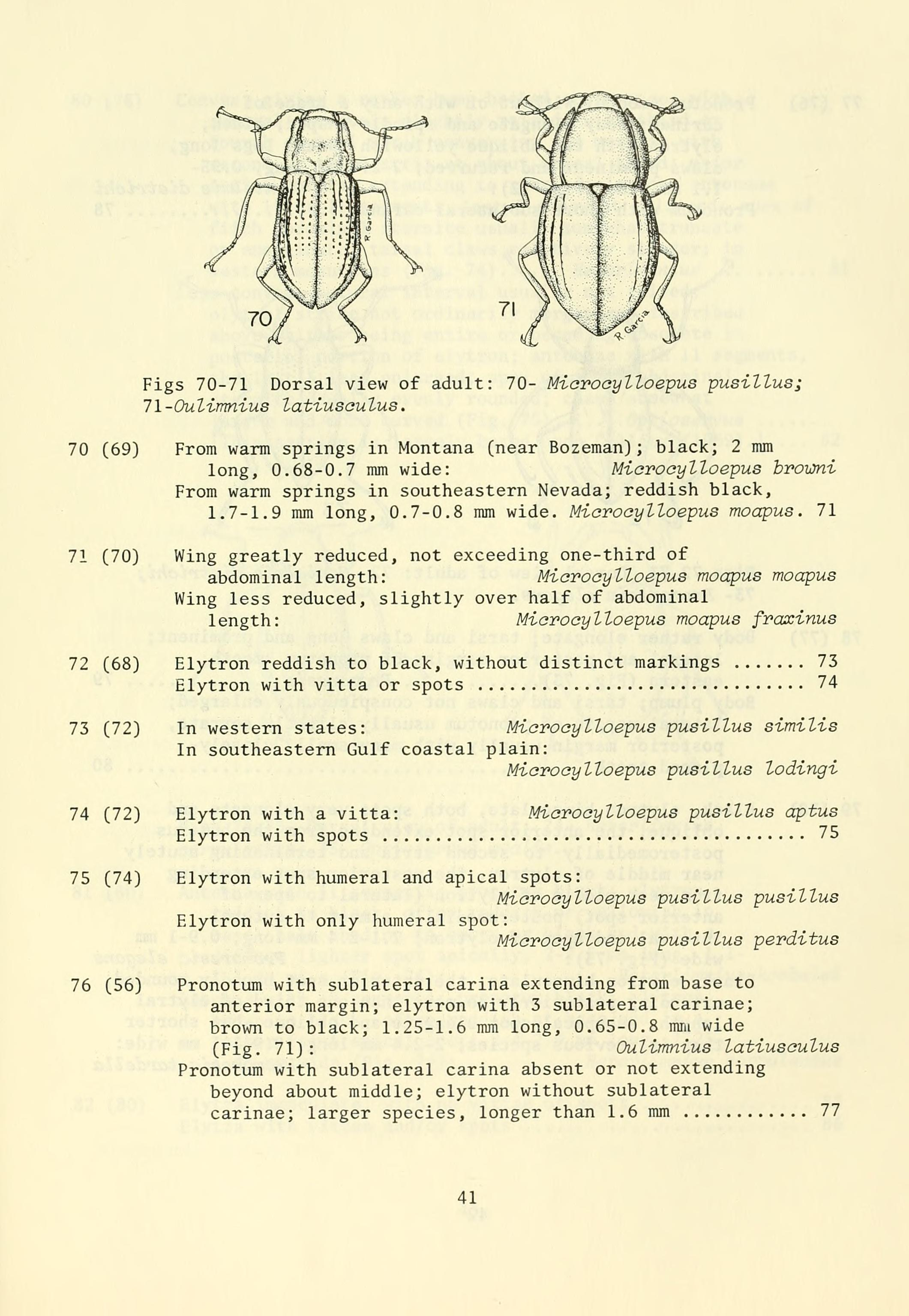
- Dorsal view of Oulimnius latiusculus on fig 71

Scientific classification
- Domain: Eukaryota
- Kingdom: Animalia
- Phylum: Arthropoda
- Class: Insecta
- Order: Coleoptera
- Suborder: Polyphaga
- Infraorder: Elateriformia
- Family: Elmidae
- Genus: Oulimnius
- Species: O. latiusculus

Binomial name
- Oulimnius latiusculus (LeConte, 1866)

Synonyms
- Elmis latiuscula LeConte, 1866

= Oulimnius latiusculus =

Species of beetle

Oulimnius latiusculus is a species of riffle beetle in the family Elmidae. It is found in North America.
