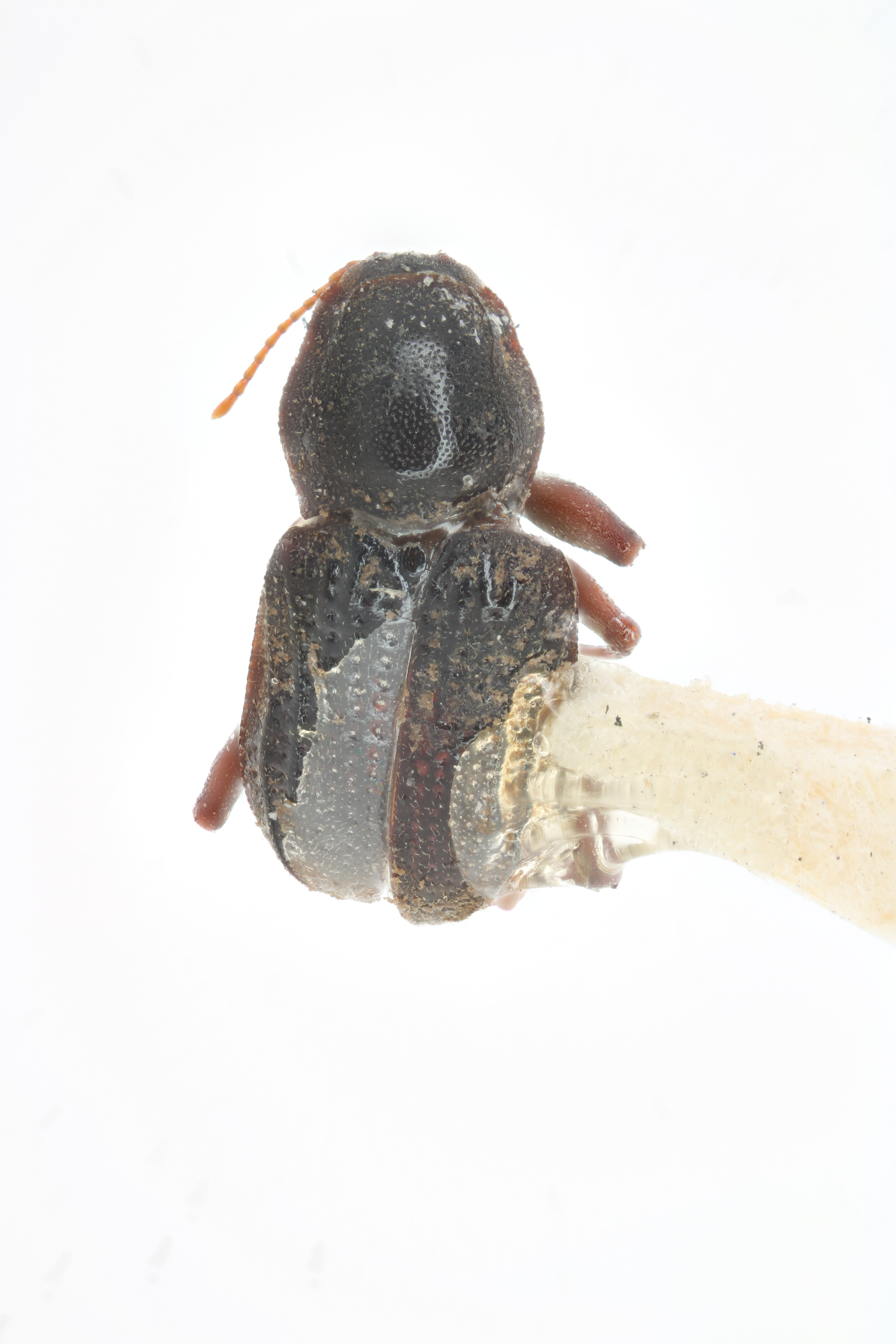
- Microcylloepus

Scientific classification
- Kingdom: Animalia
- Phylum: Arthropoda
- Clade: Pancrustacea
- Class: Insecta
- Order: Coleoptera
- Suborder: Polyphaga
- Infraorder: Elateriformia
- Family: Elmidae
- Tribe: Elmini
- Genus: Microcylloepus; Hinton, 1935

= Microcylloepus =

Genus of beetles

Microcylloepus is a genus of riffle beetles in the family Elmidae. There are 30 described species in Microcylloepus.

== Species ==
- Microcylloepus acuminatus Bug, 1973
- Microcylloepus angustus Hinton, 1940
- Microcylloepus browni (Hatch, 1938)
- Microcylloepus carinatus Hinton, 1940
- Microcylloepus chilensis Janssens, 1957
- Microcylloepus distortus (Sharp, 1882)
- Microcylloepus dolon Hinton, 1945
- Microcylloepus femoralis Hinton, 1940
- Microcylloepus formicoideus Shepard, 1990 (furnace creek riffle beetle)
- Microcylloepus grandis Hinton, 1940
- Microcylloepus granosus Hinton, 1940
- Microcylloepus immsi (Hinton, 1937)
- Microcylloepus inaequalis (Sharp, 1882)
- Microcylloepus latus Bug, 1973
- Microcylloepus loebli Polizei, 2018
- Microcylloepus longipes (Grouvelle, 1889)
- Microcylloepus moapus La Rivers, 1949
- Microcylloepus nomia Hinton, 1945
- Microcylloepus obesus Hinton, 1940
- Microcylloepus ochus Hinton, 1940
- Microcylloepus plaumanni Hinton, 1940
- Microcylloepus pumilus Bug, 1973
- Microcylloepus pusillus (Leconte, 1852)
- Microcylloepus pustulatus Hinton, 1940
- Microcylloepus similis Horn
- Microcylloepus sparsus Hinton, 1940
- Microcylloepus spinipes Hinton, 1940
- Microcylloepus steffani Bug, 1973
- Microcylloepus thermarum (Darlington, 1928)
- Microcylloepus troilus Hinton, 1940
