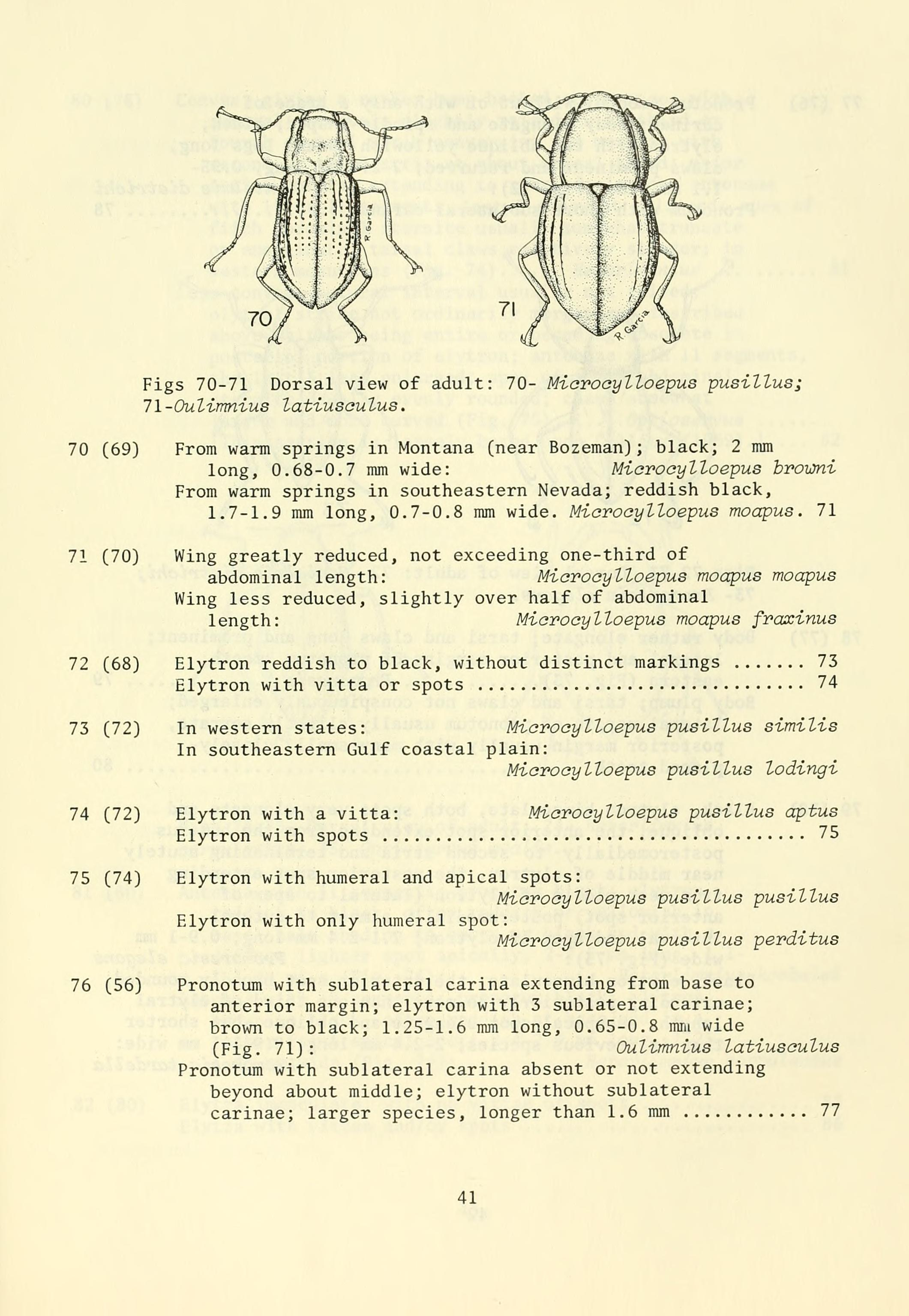
- Microcylloepus pusillus

Scientific classification
- Kingdom: Animalia
- Phylum: Arthropoda
- Clade: Pancrustacea
- Class: Insecta
- Order: Coleoptera
- Suborder: Polyphaga
- Infraorder: Elateriformia
- Family: Elmidae
- Genus: Microcylloepus
- Species: M. pusillus

Binomial name
- Microcylloepus pusillus (Leconte, 1852)

Synonyms
- Elmis similis LeConte, 1852; Stenelmis pusillus Horn, 1870

= Microcylloepus pusillus =

Species of beetle

Microcylloepus pusillus is a species of riffle beetle in the family Elmidae. It is found in North America.

== Subspecies ==
There are no valid subspecies that belong to the species Microcylloepus pusillus. One former subspecies M. pusillus similis (Horn, 1870) is considered a separate species, M. similis. The following four former subspecies are synonyms of M. pusillus:

- Microcylloepus pusillus aptus (Musgrave, 1933)
- Microcylloepus pusillus foveatus (LeConte, 1874)
- Microcylloepus pusillus loedingi (Musgrave, 1933)
- Microcylloepus pusillus perditus (Musgrave, 1933)
