= Microcylloepus formicoideus =

Scientific classification
- Domain: Eukaryota
- Kingdom: Animalia
- Phylum: Arthropoda
- Class: Insecta
- Order: Coleoptera
- Suborder: Polyphaga
- Infraorder: Elateriformia
- Family: Elmidae
- Genus: Microcylloepus
- Species: M. formicoideus

Binomial name
- Microcylloepus formicoideus Shepard, 1990

Species of beetle

Microcylloepus formicoideus, the Furnace Creek riffle beetle, is a species of riffle beetle in the family Elmidae. It is found in North America.
