= 2006 in paleontology =

Paleontology or palaeontology is the study of prehistoric life forms on Earth through the examination of plant and animal fossils. This includes the study of body fossils, tracks (ichnites), burrows, cast-off parts, fossilised feces (coprolites), palynomorphs and chemical residues. Because humans have encountered fossils for millennia, paleontology has a long history both before and after becoming formalized as a science. This article records significant discoveries and events related to paleontology that occurred or were published in the year 2006.

== Plants ==
=== Ferns and fern allies ===
Name	Novelty	Status	Authors	Age	Type locality	Location	Notes	Images
Dickwhitea	Gen et sp nov	Valid	Karafit et al.	Eocene; Ypresian	Eocene Okanagan Highlands; Allenby Formation; Princeton Chert	Canada; British Columbia	An athyriaceous fern The type species is D. allenbyensis	
Trawetsia	Gen et sp nov	Valid	Smith et al.	Eocene; Ypresian	Eocene Okanagan Highlands; Allenby Formation; Princeton Chert	Canada; British Columbia	An athyriaceous fern The type species is T. princetonensis	
Wessiea oroszii	Sp nov	Valid	Serbet & Rothwell	Campanian	Horseshoe Canyon Formation	Canada; Alberta	A fern of uncertain affinity	

=== Angiosperms ===
Name	Novelty	Status	Authors	Age	Type locality	Location	Notes	Images
Beardia	Gen et sp nov	valid	Elliot, Mindell, & Stockey	Eocene	Appian Way Flora	Canada; British Columbia	A juglandaceous fruit.	

== Arthropods ==
=== Crustaceans ===
Name	Novelty	Status	Authors	Age	Unit	Location	Notes	Images
Stenochirus vahldieki	Sp nov	Valid	Schweigert & Garassino	Early Jurassic; Callovian	La Voulte-sur-Rhöne	France	A stenochirid.	

=== Insects ===
Name	Novelty	Status	Authors	Age	Type unit	Location	Notes	Images
Avitomyrmex	Gen et 3 sp. nov	valid	Archibald, Cover, & Moreau	Eocene; Ypresian	Eocene Okanagan Highlands; Tranquille Formation	Canada; British Columbia	A myrmeciine bulldog ant The type species is A. elongatus Other species are A. mastax and A. systenus	
Emiliana	Trib, Gen, et sp. nov	valid	Shcherbakov	Eocene; Ypresian	Green River Formation; Parachute Member	USA; Colorado	A tropiduchid planthopper	
Eocenomyrma	Gen et 3 sp nov	Valid	Dlussky & Radchenko	Eocene; Priabonian	Baltic amber	Russia	A Myrmicin ant The type species is E. orthospina Other species are E. electrina & E. elegantula	Eocenomyrma elegantula
Feroseta	Gen et sp nov	valid	Poinar	Miocene; Burdigalian	Dominican amber	Dominican Republic	A mantidfly The type species is F. prisca	
Macabeemyrma	Gen et sp. nov	valid	Archibald, Cover, & Moreau	Eocene; Ypresian	Eocene Okanagan Highlands; Tranquille Formation	Canada; British Columbia	A myrmeciine bulldog ant The type species is M. ovata	Macabeemyrma ovata
Palaeopsychops douglasae	Sp nov	valid	Archibald & Makarkin	Eocene; Ypresian	Eocene Okanagan Highlands; Coldwater Beds	Canada; British Columbia	An ithionid giant lacewing	
Palaeopsychops marringerae	Sp nov	valid	Archibald & Makarkin	Eocene; Ypresian	Eocene Okanagan Highlands; Klondike Mountain Formation	United States; Washington	An ithionid giant lacewing	Palaeopsychops marringerae
Palaeopsychops quadratus	Sp nov	valid	Archibald & Makarkin	Eocene; Ypresian	Fur Formation	Denmark	An ithionid giant lacewing	
Palaeopsychops setosus	Sp nov	valid	Archibald & Makarkin	Eocene; Ypresian	Eocene Okanagan Highlands; Horsefly Shales	Canada; British Columbia	An ithionid giant lacewing	
Palaeopsychops timmi	Sp nov	valid	Archibald & Makarkin	Eocene; Ypresian	Eocene Okanagan Highlands; Klondike Mountain Formation	United States; Washington	An ithionid giant lacewing	Palaeopsychops timmi
Palaeovespa menatensis	Sp nov	valid	Nel & Auvray	Paleocene; Thanetian	Menat Formation	France	A vespid wasp	Palaeovespa menatensis
Polystoechotites	Gen et 3 sp nov	valid	Archibald & Makarkin	Eocene; Ypresian	Eocene Okanagan Highlands; Klondike Mountain Formation	United States; Washington	An ithionid giant lacewing parataxon Species include P. barksdalae, P. falcatus, P. lewisi Also includes Polystoechotes piperatus (1908)	Polystoechotites barksdalae
Ypresiomyrma	Gen, sp., et comb nov	valid	Archibald, Cover, & Moreau	Eocene; Ypresian	Fur Formation	Denmark	A myrmeciine bulldog ant The type species is Y. orbiculata Other species are Y. bartletti & Pachycondyla rebekkae (1999)	Ypresiomyrma rebekkae

== Molluscs ==
=== Cephalopods ===
Name	Novelty	Status	Authors	Age	Unit	Location	Notes	Images
Tirolonautilus feltgeni	Sp nov	Valid	Chirat, Vaslet & Le Nindre	Late Permian	Khuff Formation	Saudi Arabia	A nautiloid.	

== Tetrapodomorphs ==
Name	Novelty	Status	Authors	Age	Unit	Location	Notes	Images
Tiktaalik	Gen et sp nov	Valid	Daeschler, Shubin, & Jenkins	Late Devonian	Fram Formation	Canada (Nunavut)	Type species T. roseae. The Earliest Tetrapod.	Tiktaalik roseae

== Amphibians ==
=== Newly named temnospondylians ===
Name	Status	Authors	Age	Unit	Location	Notes	Images
Iberospondylus	Valid	Laurin; Soler-Gijon	Late Carboniferous		Spain	The type species is Iberospondylus schultzei.	Iberospondylus
Tirraturhinus	Valid	Nield; Damiani; Warren	Early Triassic	Arcadia Formation	Australia	The type species is Tirraturhinus smisseni.	
Trematolestes	Valid	Schoch	Middle Triassic	Erfurt Formation	Germany	The type species is Trematolestes hagdorni.	Trematolestes

=== Newly named amphibians ===
Name	Status	Authors	Age	Unit	Location	Notes	Images
Pangerpeton	Valid	Wang; Evans	Late Jurassic/Early Cretaceous	Daohugou Beds	China	The type species is Pangerpeton sinensis.	

== Ichthyosaurs ==
Name	Status	Authors	Age	Unit	Location	Notes	Images
Maiaspondylus	Valid	Maxwell; Caldwell	Early Cretaceous	Loon River Formation	Canada	The type species is Maiaspondylus lindoei.	

== Lepidosauromorphs ==
=== Newly named basal lepidosauromorphs ===
Name	Status	Authors	Age	Unit	Location	Notes	Images
Rautiania	Valid	Bulanov; Sennikov	Late Permian	Vyasovka Formation	Russia	Two species was descript: Rautiania alexandri (type) and R. minchi.	

=== Newly named plesiosaurs ===
Name	Status	Authors	Age	Unit	Location	Notes	Images
Bobosaurus	Valid	Dalla Vecchia	Late Triassic	Rio del Lago Formation	Italy	The type species is Bobosaurus forojuliensis.	
Futabasaurus	Valid	Sato; Hasegawa; Manabe	Late Cretaceous	Tamayama Formation	Japan	The type species is Futabasaurus suzukii.	
Opallionectes	Valid	Kear	Early Cretaceous		Australia	The type species is Opallionectes andamookaensis.	
Umoonasaurus	Valid	Kear; Schroeder; Lee	Early Cretaceous	Bulldog Shale	Australia	The type species is Umoonasaurus demoscyllus.	

=== Newly named squamates ===
Name	Novelty	Status	Authors	Age	Unit	Location	Notes	Images
Najash	Gen et sp nov	Valid	Apesteguia & Zaher	Late Cretaceous	Candeleros Formation	Argentina	Type sp N rionegrina.	

== Turtles ==
Name	Status	Authors	Age	Unit	Location	Notes	Images
Gigantatypus	Valid	Kaddumi	Late Cretaceous (Maastrichtian)	Muwaqqar Chalk Marl Formation	Jordan	A sea turtle. The type species is G. salahi.	

== Archosauromorphs ==
=== Newly named crurotarsans ===
Name	Status	Authors	Age	Unit	Location	Notes	Images
Adamantinasuchus	Valid	Nobre; Carvalho	Late Cretaceous	Adamantina Formation	Brazil	A notosuchian. The type species is Adamantinasuchus navae.	Adamantinasuchus
Aldabrachampsus	Valid	Brochu	Pleistocene		Seychelles	A crocodylid. The type species is Aldabrachampsus dilophus.	
Effigia	Valid	Nesbitt; Norell	Late Triassic	Chinle Formation	USA (New Mexico)	A rauisuchian. The type species is Effigia okeeffeae.	Effigia
Isisfordia	Valid	Salisbury; Molnar; Frey; Willis	Early-Late Cretaceous	Winton Formation	Australia	A eusuchian. The type species is Isisfordia duncani.	Isisfordia

=== Newly named dinosaurs ===
- Vickaryous, M K., 2006, New information on the cranial anatomy of Edmontonia rugosidens Gilmore, a Late Cretaceous nodosaurid dinosaur from Dinosaur Provincial Park, Alberta: JVP, v. 26, n. 4: 1011–1013.

Data are courtesy of George Olshevky's dinosaur genera list.

Name	Status	Authors		Location	Notes	Images
Adamantisaurus	Valid taxon	Rodrigo Santucci	Reinaldo Jose Bertini	Brazil		Adamantisaurus
Agujaceratops	Valid taxon	Spencer G. Lucas; Sullivan	Hunt	USA (Texas)		Agujaceratops
Alaskacephale	Valid taxon	Sullivan		USA (Alaska)	Apachycephalosaurid from Alaska.	Alaskacephale
Aniksosaurus	Valid taxon	Martínez	Novas	Argentina		
Antarctopelta.	Valid taxon	Salgado	Gasparini	Antarctica	An Ankylosaur from Antarctica	Antarctopelta
Balochisaurus	Valid taxon	Malkani		Pakistan		
"Bayosaurus"	Nomen nudum	Rodolfo Coria; Phillip J. Currie	Paulina Carabajal			
Cedrorestes	Valid taxon	David Gilpin; Tony DiCroce	Kenneth Carpenter	USA(Utah)		
Dracorex	Jr. Synonym	Robert Bakker; Sullivan; Porter	Larson; Saulsbury		Jr. Synonym of Pachycephalosaurus.	Dracorex
Dracovenator	Valid taxon	Yates		South Africa	An African Neotheropod related to Dilophosaurus.	Dracovenator
Erketu	Valid taxon	Ksepka	Mark Norell	Mongolia		
Europasaurus	Valid taxon	Mateus Laven Knötschke vide: Sander; Mateus	Laven; Knötschke	Germany	A basal macronarian sauropod exhibiting insular dwarfism.	Europasaurus
Fusuisaurus	Valid taxon	Mo; Wang W.; Huang Z.	Huang X.; Xu X.	China		
Guanlong	Valid taxon	Xu Xing; Clark; Forster; Mark Norell	Erickson; Eberth; Jia C.; Zhao Q.	China	A basal, crested Tyrannosauroid.	Guanlong
Huanghetitan.	Valid taxon	You; Li D.	Zhou L.; Ji Q.	China		
Jiutaisaurus	Valid taxon	Wu W. H.; Dong Zhiming; Sun	Li C.; Li T.			
Juravenator	Valid taxon	Göhlich	Luis M. Chiappe	Germany	A feathered Compsognathid.	Juravenator
Khetranisaurus	Valid taxon	Malkani		Pakistan		
Koutalisaurus	Jr. Synonym	Prieto-Marquez; Gaete; Rivas	Galobart; Boada		Jr. Synonym of Pararhabdodon.	
Ligabuesaurus	Valid taxon	Jose Bonaparte; González-Riga (as González Riga)	Apesteguía	Argentina	An Argentine Titanosaur.	
Mantellisaurus	Valid taxon	Paul		Belgium; Germany; UK; Spain		Mantellisaurus
Mapusaurus	Valid taxon	Rodolfo Coria	Phillip J. Currie	Argentina	An Argentine Carcharodontosaur.	Mapusaurus
Marisaurus	Valid taxon	Malkani		Pakistan		
Maxakalisaurus	Valid taxon	Kellner; Campos; Azevedo; Trotta	Henriques; Craik; Silva	Brazil		Maxakalisaurus
Othnielosaurus	Valid taxon	Peter Galton		USA (Colorado, Utah and Wyoming)		Othnielosaurus
Pakisaurus	Valid taxon	Malkani		Pakistan		
Razanandrongobe	Valid taxon	Maganuco; Dal Sasso	Pasini		Described by the authors as a possible crocodylomorph or theropod.	
Sacisaurus	Valid taxon	Ferigolo	Langer	Brazil	Possibly a Dinosaur.	Sacisaurus
Sonidosaurus	Valid taxon	Xu X.; Zhang X. H.; Tan Q.	Zhao X.; Tan L.	China		
Sulaimanisaurus	Valid taxon	Malkani		Pakistan		
Theiophytalia	Valid taxon	Brill	Carpenter	USA (Colorado)		Theiophytalia
Tsaagan	Valid taxon	Mark Norell; Clark; Turner	Makovicky; Rinchen Barsbold; Rowe	Mongolia		Tsaagan
Turiasaurus	Valid taxon	Royo-Torres; Cobos	Alcalá	Spain		
Vitakridrinda.	Valid taxon	Malkani		Pakistan	An Abelisaur from Pakistan.	
Xuanhuaceratops	Valid taxon	Zhao X.; Cheng Z.	Xu X.; Makovicky	China		
Yamaceratops	Valid taxon	Makovicky	Mark Norell	China		Yamaceratops
Yinlong	Valid taxon	Xu X.; Forster	Clark; Mo	China		Yinlong
Yuanmousaurus	Valid taxon	Lü; Li S.; Ji Q.	Wang G. F.; Zhang J. H.; Dong Zhiming	China		
Zapalasaurus	Valid taxon	Salgado; Carvalho	Garrido	Argentina	An Argentine Rebbachisaur.	

=== Newly named birds ===
Name	Status	Novelty	Authors	Age	Unit	Location	Notes	Images
Abdounornis marinus	Nomen Nudum	Thesis name	Bourdon	Early Ypresian		Morocco	A species of Charadriiformes, Abdounornithidae.	
Aequornis traversei	Nomen Nudum	Thesis name	Bourdon	Middle Eocene		Togo	A species of Pelagornithidae.	
Anas cheuen	Valid	Sp. nov.	Agnolín	Early or Middle Pleistocene	Miramar Formation	Argentina	A species of Anas.	
Archaeorhynchus spathula	Valid	Gen et Sp. nov.	Zhonghe & Fucheng	Early Cretaceous	Yixian Formation	China	An Ornithurae, type sp A. spathula.	
Branta thessaliensis	Valid	Sp. nov.	Boev & Koufos	Middle Turolian		Greece	An Anatidae.	
Cerebavis cenomanica	Valid	Gen. et Sp. nov.	Kurochkin, Saveliev, Postnov, Pervushov, & Popov	Cenomanian		Russia	An Enantiornithes, described from a brain endocast.	
Corvitalusoides	Valid	Gen. et Sp. nov.	Boles	Late Oligocene or Early Miocene	Riversleigh	Australia: Queensland	A Passeriformes Incertae Sedis. Type species C. grandiculus	
Cyanoliseus patagonopsis	Valid	Sp. nov.	Hospitaleche & Tambussi	Pleistocene	Miramar Formation	Argentina	A Psittacidae.	
Dalingheornis	Valid	Gen. nov. et Sp. nov.	Zhang, Hou, Hasegawa, O'Connor, Martin, & Chiappe	Early Cretaceous	Yixian Formation	China	An Enantiornithes, type species is Dal. liweii.	
Dapingfangornis	Valid	Gen. nov. et Sp. nov.	Li, Duan, Hu, Wang, Cheng, & Hou	Early Cretaceous	Jiufotang Formation	China	An Enantiornithes, type species Dap. sentisorhinus	
Didunculus placopedetes	Valid	Sp. nov.	Steadman	Subrecent	'Eua	Tonga	A Columbidae.	
Ducula harrisoni	Valid	Sp. nov.	Wragg & Worthy	Subrecent	Henderson Island	Pitcairn	A Columbidae.	
Eclectus infectus	Valid	Sp. nov.	Steadman	Holocene	'Eua, 'Anatu	Vanuatu	A Psittacidae.	
Gallirallus ernstmayri	Valid	Sp. nov.	Jeremy J. Kirchman & Steadman	Holocene	New Ireland, Bismarck Archipelago	Papua New Guinea	A Rallidae.	
Gallirallus pendiculentus	Valid	Sp. nov.	Kirchman & Steadman	Holocene	Tinian	Northern Mariana Islands	A Rallidae.	
Gallirallus pisonii	Valid	Sp. nov.	Kirchman & Steadman	Holocene	Tinian	Northern Mariana Islands	A Rallidae.	
Gallirallus storrsolsoni	Valid	Sp. nov.	Kirchman & Steadman	Holocene	Huahine, Society Islands	French Polynesia	A Rallidae.	
Gallirallus temptatus	Valid	Sp. nov.	Kirchman & Steadman	Holocene	Rota	Northern Mariana Islands	A Rallidae.	
Jungornis geraldmayri	Valid	Sp. nov.	Mourer-Chauviré & Sigé	Late Eocene	Phosphorites du Quercy	France	A Jungornithidae	
Loxioides kikuchi	Valid	Sp. nov.	James & Olson	Subrecent	Kauaʻi, Hawaii Islands	USA	A Fringillidae	
Masillaraptor	Valid	Gen. nov. et Sp. nov.	Mayr	Middle Eocene	Messel pit	Germany	A Masillaraptoridae, type species M. parvunguis	
Nyctanassa carcinocatactes	Valid	Sp. nov.	Olson & Wingate	Holocene	Bermuda	Bermuda	An Ardeidae.	
Odontopteryx gigas	Nomen Nudum	Thesis name	Bourdon	Early Ypresian		Morocco	An Odontopterygidae	
Odontoptila inexpectata	Nomen Nudum	Thesis name	Bourdon	Early Ypresian		Morocco	An Odontopterygidae	
Pleistoanser	Valid	Gen. et Sp. nov.	Agnolín	Early or Middle Pleistocene	Miramar Formation	Argentina	An Anatidae. Type species is P. bravardi.	
Plesiocathartes major	Valid	Sp. nov.	Weidig	Late Wasatchian	Green River Formation	USA	A Leptosomidae.	
Plesiocathartes wyomingensis	Valid	Sp. nov.	Weidig	Late Wasatchian	Green River Formation	USA	A Leptosomidae.	
Porphyrio mcnabi	Valid	Sp. nov.	Kirchman & Steadman	Holocene	Huahine, Fa'ahia, Society Islands	French Polynesia	A Rallidae.	
Pygoscelis calderensis	Valid	Sp. nov.	Hospitaleche, Chávez, & Fritis	Late Miocene-Middle Pliocene	Bahia Inglesa Formation	Chile	A Spheniscidae.	
Pygoscelis grandis	Valid	Sp. nov.	Walsh & Suárez	?Early Pliocene	Bahia Inglesa Formation	Chile	A Spheniscidae.	
Shanxiornis	Valid	Gen. et Sp. nov.	Wang, Zhao, Hu, & Sun	Early Pleistocene	Sanmen Formation	China	A Phasianidae, type species is S. fenyinis	
Tonniornis	Valid	Gen. nov. et Sp. nov.	Tambussi, Hospitaleche, Reguero, & Marenssi	Late Eocene	La Meseta Formation	Antarctica	A Spheniscidae, two species T. mesetaensis & T. minimum	
Waimanu	Valid	Gen. nov. et Sp. nov.	Slack, Jones, Ando, Harrison, Fordyce, Arnason, & Penny	Early Paleocene	Basic Waipara Greensand	New Zealand	A stem Spheniscidae. The type species is Wa. manneringi. Originally the second species, Wa. tuatahi, was assigned to this genus as well; Mayr et al. (2018) transferred this species to the separate genus Muriwaimanu.	
Wieslochia	Valid	Gen. et Sp. nov.	Mayr & Manegold	Rupelian		Germany	An early Passeriformes Incertae Sedis, type species is Wi. weissi	

=== Newly named pterosaurs ===
Name	Status	Authors	Age	Unit	Location	Notes	Images
Cathayopterus	Valid	Wang; Zhou	Early Cretaceous	Yixian Formation	China	A pterodactyloid. The type species is Cathayopterus grabaui.	
Caviramus	Valid	Fröbisch; Fröbisch	Late Triassic	Kössen Formation	Switzerland	A rhamphorhynchoid. The type species is Caviramus schesaplanensis.	
Longchengpterus	Valid	Wang; Li; Duan; Cheng	Early Cretaceous	Jiufotang Formation	China	A pterodactyloid. The type species is Longchengpterus zhoai.	
Muzquizopteryx	Valid	Frey; Buchy; Stinnesbeck; Gonzalez; Stefano	Late Cretaceous	Austin Group	Mexico	The type species is Muzquizopteryx coahuilensis.	
Yixianopterus	Valid	Lü; Ji; Yuan; Gao; Sun; Ji	Early Cretaceous	Yixian Formation	China	A pterodactyloid. The type species is Yixianopterus jingangshanensis.	

== Synapsids ==
=== Non-mammalian ===
Name	Status	Authors	Age	Unit	Location	Notes	Images
Herpetoskylax	Valid	Sidor; Rubidge	Late Permian		South Africa	The type species is Herpetoskylax hopsoni.	
Elliotherium	Valid	Sidor; Hancox	Upper Triassic	Lower Elliot Formation	South Africa	The type species is Elliotherium kerstenae (emmend.).	
Idelesaurus	Valid	Kurkin	Upper Permian		Russia	The type species is Idelisaurus tataricus.	
Langbergia	Valid	Abdala; Neveling; Welman	Early Triassic	Burgersdorp Formation	South Africa	The type species is Langbergia modisei.	
Nanogomphodon	Valid	Hopson; Sues	Middle Triassic	Erfurt Formation	Germany	The type species is Nanogomphodon wildi.	
Oromycter	Valid	Reisz	Early Permian		USA	The type species is Oromycter dolesorum.	
Pachydectes	Valid	Rubidge; Sidor; Modesto	Middle Permian	Koonap Formation	South Africa	The type species is Pachydectes elsi.	
Paraburnetia	Valid	Smith; Rubidge; Sidor	Upper Permian	Teekloof Formation	South Africa	The type species is Paraburnetia sneeubergensis.	
Protheriodon	Valid	Bonaparte, Soares, & Schultz	Middle Triassic	Santa Maria Formation	Brazil	Type sp P. estudianti.	

=== Mammals ===
Name	Status	Authors	Age	Unit	Location	Notes	Images
Anthracoxyaena	Disputed	Tong & Wang	Early Eocene	Wutu Formation	China	A member of the family Oxyaenidae. Genus includes new species A. palustris. Subsequently, Solé, Gheerbrant & Godinot (2013) considered the genus Anthracoxyaena to be a junior synonym of the genus Arfia, though the authors maintained A. palustris as a distinct species within the latter genus.	
Asiohyopsodus	Valid	Tong & Wang	Early Eocene	Wutu Formation	China	A member of the family Hyopsodontidae. Genus includes new species A. confuciusi.	
Asioictops	Valid	Tong & Wang	Early Eocene	Wutu Formation	China	A member of the family Leptictidae. Genus includes new species A. mckennai.	
Celaenolambda	Valid	Tong & Wang	Early Eocene	Wutu Formation	China	A possible member of the family Archaeolambdidae. Genus includes new species C. wangzhaoi.	
Chowliia	Valid	Tong & Wang	Early Eocene	Wutu Formation	China	A member of the family Isectolophidae. Genus includes new species C. laoshanensis.	
Dianomomys	Valid	Tong & Wang	Early Eocene	Wutu Formation	China	A possible member of the family Paromomyidae. Genus includes new species D. ambiguus.	
Dissacus bohaiensis	Valid	Tong & Wang	Early Eocene	Wutu Formation	China	A member of Mesonychia belonging to the family Mesonychidae.	
Hapalodectes huanghaiensis	Valid	Tong & Wang	Early Eocene	Wutu Formation	China	A member of Mesonychia belonging to the family Hapalodectidae.	
Heterocoryphodon？yuntongi	Valid	Tong & Wang	Early Eocene	Wutu Formation	China	A member of the family Coryphodontidae.	
Hylomysoides	Valid	Tong & Wang	Early Eocene	Wutu Formation	China	A possible member of the family Amphilemuridae. Genus includes new species H. qiensis.	
Luchenus	Valid	Tong & Wang	Early Eocene	Wutu Formation	China	A member of the family Erinaceidae. Genus includes new species L. erinaceanus.	
Migrostylops	Valid	Tong & Wang	Early Eocene	Wutu Formation	China	A member of Arctostylopida belonging to the family Arctostylopidae. Genus includes new species M. roboreus and M. rosella.	
Pappomoropus	Valid	Tong & Wang	Early Eocene	Wutu Formation	China	A member of the family Eomoropidae. Genus includes new species P. taishanensis.	
Paresthonyx	Valid	Tong & Wang	Early Eocene	Wutu Formation	China	A member of Tillodontia. Genus includes new species P. orientalis.	
Preonictis	Valid	Tong & Wang	Early Eocene	Wutu Formation	China	A member of the family Hyaenodontidae belonging to the subfamily Proviverrinae. Genus includes new species P. youngi.	
Qilulestes	Valid	Tong & Wang	Early Eocene	Wutu Formation	China	A possible member of the family Amphilemuridae. Genus includes new species Q. schieboutae.	
Scileptictis	Valid	Tong & Wang	Early Eocene	Wutu Formation	China	A member of the family Leptictidae. Genus includes new species S. simplus and S? stenotalus.	
Suyinia	Valid	Tong & Wang	Early Eocene	Wutu Formation	China	A member of Anagalida belonging to the family Pseudictopidae. Genus includes new species S. changleensis.	
Taishanomys parvulus	Valid	Tong & Wang	Early Eocene	Wutu Formation	China	A rodent.	
Talpilestes	Valid	Tong & Wang	Early Eocene	Wutu Formation	China	A possible member of the family Nyctitheriidae. Genus includes new species T. asiatica.	
Variviverra	Valid	Tong & Wang	Early Eocene	Wutu Formation	China	A member of the family Viverravidae. Genus includes new species V. vegetatus.	
Wutucoryphodon	Valid	Tong & Wang	Early Eocene	Wutu Formation	China	A member of the family Coryphodontidae. Genus includes new species W. xianwui.	
Wutuhyus	Valid	Tong & Wang	Early Eocene	Wutu Formation	China	A member of Suiformes of uncertain phylogenetic placement. Genus includes new species W. primiveris.	
Yupingale	Valid	Tong & Wang	Early Eocene	Wutu Formation	China	A member of the family Astigalidae. Genus includes new species Y. weifangensis.	
Zodiocyon	Valid	Tong & Wang	Early Eocene	Wutu Formation	China	A member of the family Miacidae. Genus includes new species Z. zetesios.	

== Trace fossils ==
- The trace fossil genera Nihilichnus (Nihilichnus nihilicus and Nihilichnus mortalis), Machichnus (Machichnus regularis, Machichnus multilineatus, and Machichnus bohemicus) and Brutalichnus (Brutalichnus brutalis) are described from bite traces.
