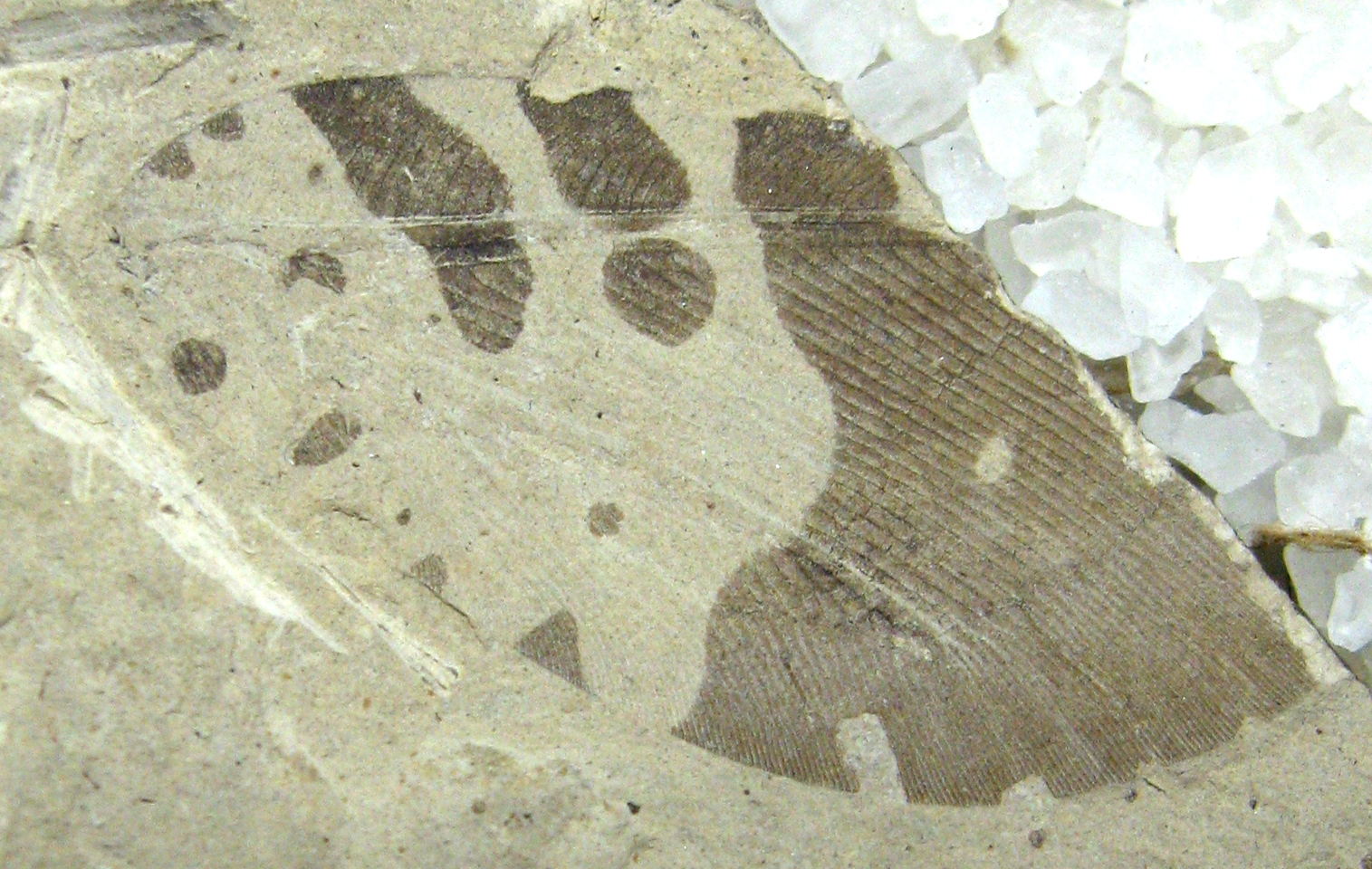
- Palaeopsychops timmi holotype wing, SRIC SR 02-25-01

Scientific classification
- Kingdom: Animalia
- Phylum: Arthropoda
- Clade: Pancrustacea
- Class: Insecta
- Order: Neuroptera
- Family: Ithonidae
- Genus: †Palaeopsychops; Andersen, 2001

Species
- See text

= Palaeopsychops =

Palaeopsychops Temporal range: 54.52–49.5 Ma Ypresian

Extinct genus of lacewings

Palaeopsychops is an extinct genus of lacewing in the moth lacewings family Ithonidae. The genus is known from Early Eocene fossils found in Europe, and North America and is composed of ten species. The ten species can be informally separated into two species groups based on veination of the forewings, the "European" and "North American" groups. When first described, the genus was placed in the family Psychopsidae, but later was moved to Polystoechotidae, which itself is now considered a subgroup of the moth lacewings.

== Distribution and age ==
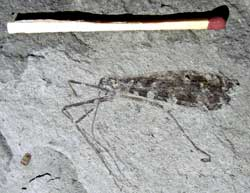
C. bittaciformis

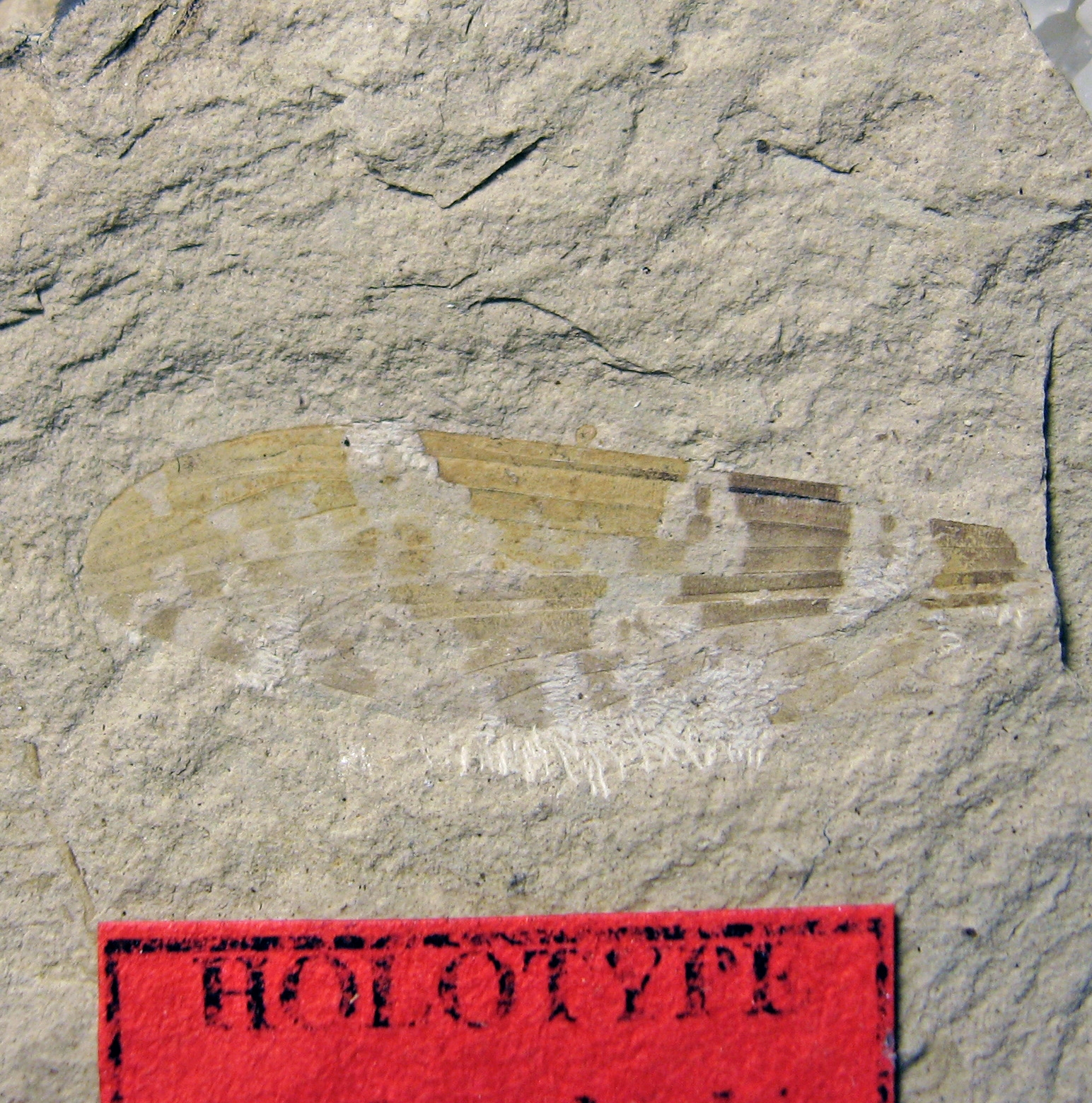
C. brooksi

Cimbrophlebia species
Fur Formation (left) and Okanagan Highlands (right)

The European species of Palaeopsychops are all known from the Early Eocene Fur Formation along the western Limfjord coast of Denmark. Most of the 60 m (200 ft) thick formation is diatomites with an interspersed sequence of approximately 179 ash layers. Argon–argon radiometric dating of ash layer "+19", which is slightly lower in the strata then the "insect beds", has determined a 54.04 ± 0.14 million years ago age.

Palaeopsychops species have been recovered from three locations in the Okanagan highlands, the Horsefly shales near Horsefly, British Columbia, the Coldwater Beds Quilchena site near Quilchena, British Columbia and the Klondike Mountain Formation in Republic, Washington, northern Ferry County, Washington. The Okanagan highlands are aged between 51.5 ± 0.4 million years ago for the Quilchena site to 49.4 ± 0.5 million years ago for the Klondike Mountain Formations Tom Thumb Tuff member.

Archibald and Makarkin (2006) suggested the Turgai Sea which separated western Europe and Asia from the Cretaceous to Oligocene prevented the spread of polystoechotid group lacewings into Asia from Europe. The disjunct distribution of Palaeopsychops between Denmark and the Okanagan Highlands may have been enabled by rising crust elevations in the northern Atlantic region and subsequent increase in landmass during the Late Paleocene which linked Northern Europe with Greenland until at least the Early Eocene. Several land bridge routes may have acted as migration corridors for biotic interchange, the northern De Geer land bridge from Fennoscandia to North America via northern Greenland, and the southern Thulean land bridge from northern Britain though the Faroe Islands and then Greenland and North America. Other insect genera that share a similar disjunct distribution include the mecopteran Cimbrophlebia, the green lacewing Protochrysa and the bull dog ant Ypresiomyrma.

== Paleoenvironment ==
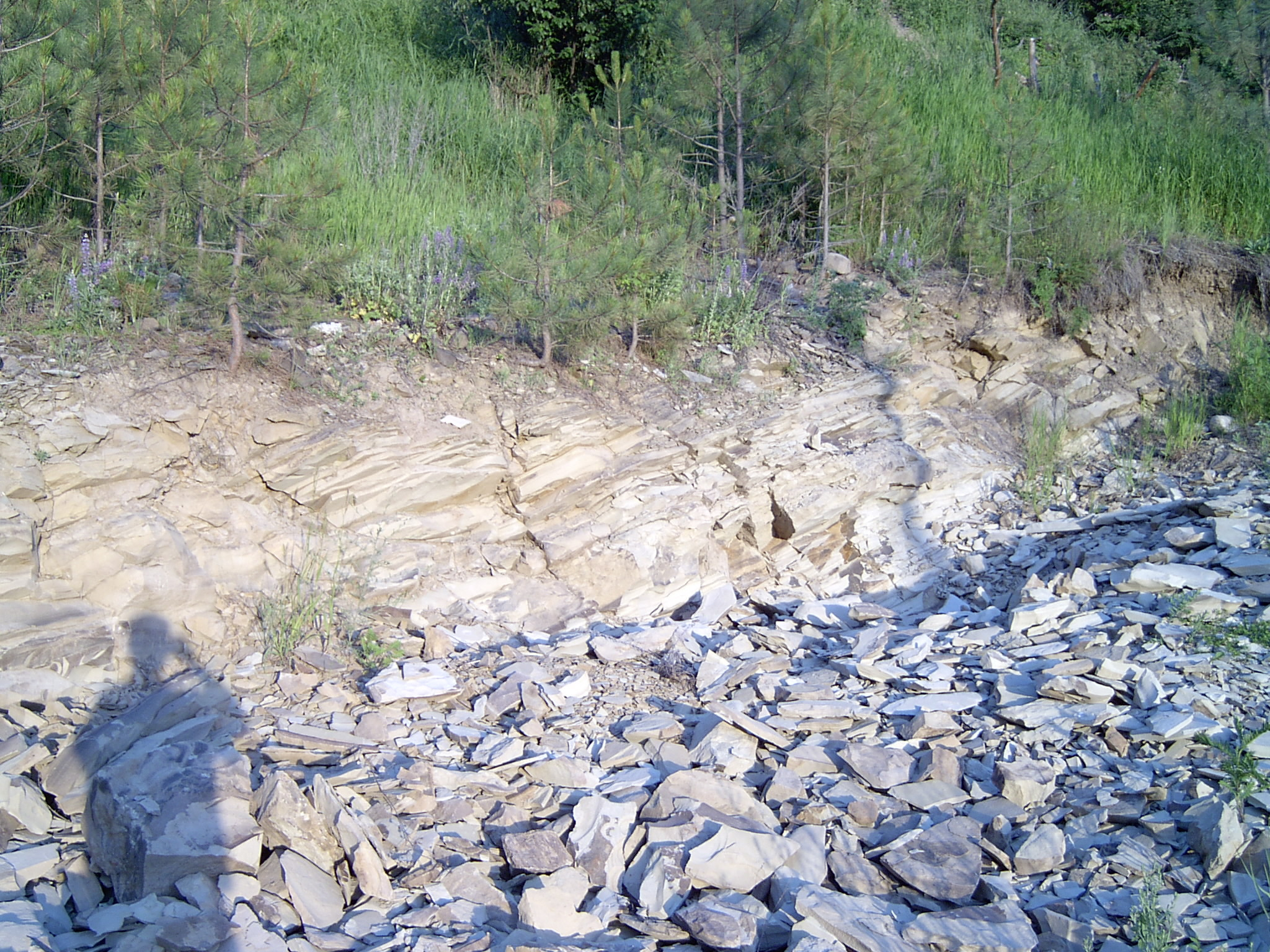
Outcrop of the Klondike Mountain Formation in Republic

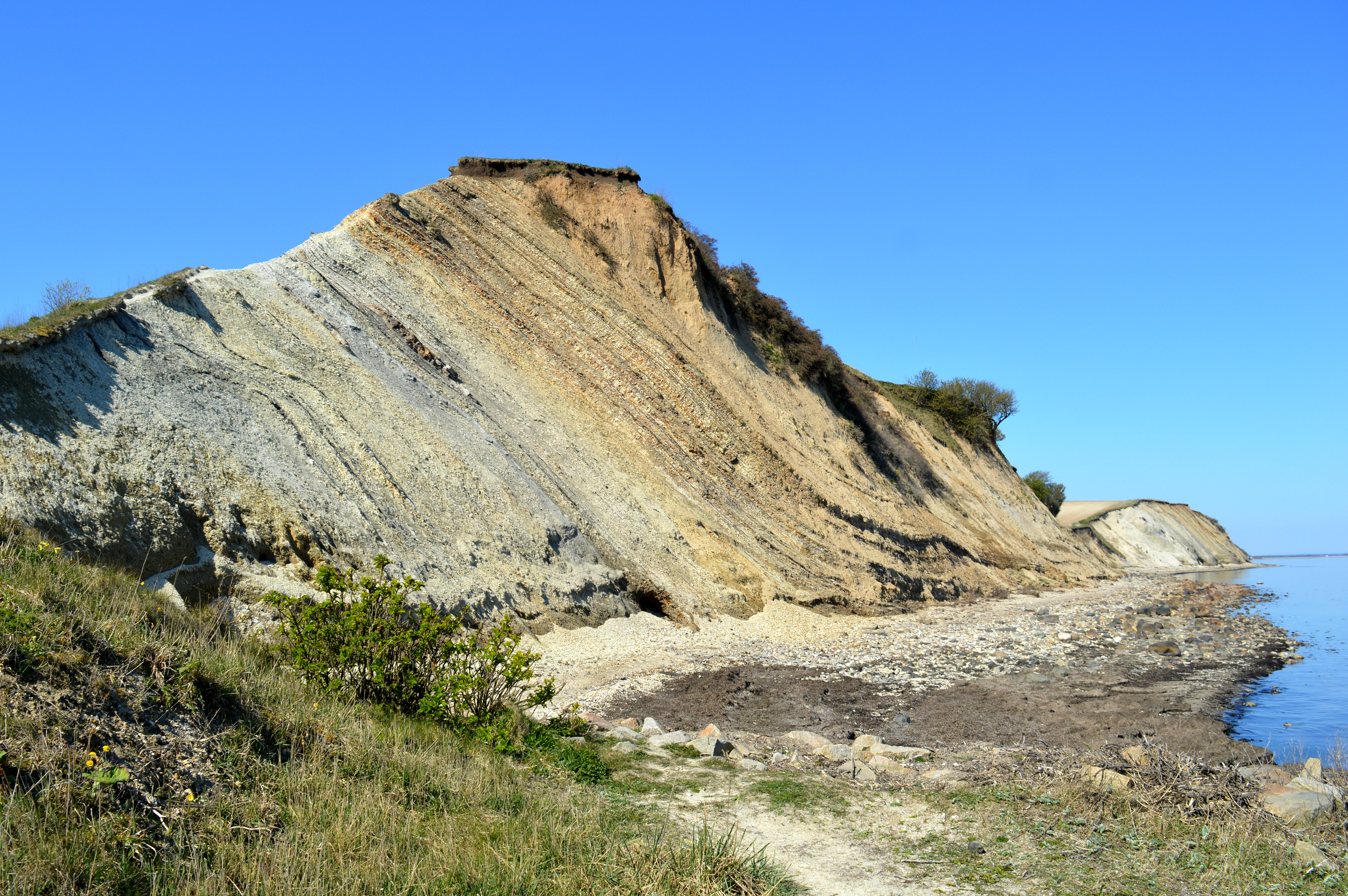
Coastal outcrop of the Fur Formation at Ejerslev

The Fur formation represents a marine depositional environment of the inland water body which is ancestral to the North Sea. While the ancestral water body had an occasional opening to the Atlantic, it was entirely or almost entirely enclosed by land. The Fur formation outcrop is of a site that is an undetermined distance from the paleoshoreline with the preserved terrestrial flora and fauna suggested to have been carried from a shoreline to the north of the site by winds or drifting. Analysis of the δ^{18}O/δ^{16}O isotope ratio found in mollusc shells in the formation indicates paleotemperatures were of a low megathermal mean annual temperature, though the presence in the paleobiota of thermophilic taxa could indicate a lower mean annual temperature combined with a higher coldest month mean temperature.

All three Okanagan Highlands sites represent upland lake systems that were surrounded by a warm temperate ecosystem with nearby volcanism. The highlands likely had a mesic upper microthermal to lower mesothermal climate, in which winter temperatures rarely dropped low enough for snow, and which were seasonably equitable. The paleoforest surrounding the lakes have been described as precursors to the modern temperate broadleaf and mixed forests of Eastern North America and Eastern Asia. Based on the fossil biotas the lakes were higher and cooler then the coeval coastal forests preserved in the Puget Group and Chuckanut Formation of Western Washington, which are described as lowland tropical forest ecosystems. Estimates of the paleoelevation range between 0.7–1.2 km (0.43–0.75 mi) higher than the coastal forests. This is consistent with the paleoelevation estimates for the lake systems, which range between 1.1–2.9 km (1,100–2,900 m), which is similar to the modern elevation 0.8 km (0.50 mi), but higher.

Estimates of the mean annual temperature have been derived from climate leaf analysis multivariate program (CLAMP) analysis of the Republic and Quilchena paleofloras, and leaf margin analysis (LMA) of all three paleofloras. The CLAMP results after multiple linear regressions for Republic gave a mean annual temperature of approximately 8.0 °C (46.4 °F), with the LMA giving 9.2 ± 2.0 °C (48.6 ± 3.6 °F). CLAMP results from Quilchena returned the higher 13.3 ± 2.1 °C (55.9 ± 3.8 °F) which was supported by the 14.8 ± 2.0 °C (58.6 ± 3.6 °F) returned from the LMA. LMA of the Horsefly flora returned a mean annual temperature of 10.4 ± 2.2 °C (50.7 ± 4.0 °F). These are lower than the mean annual temperature estimates given for the coastal Puget Group, which is estimated to have been between 15–18.6 °C (59.0–65.5 °F). The bioclimatic analysis for Republic, Quilchena, and Horsefly suggest mean annual precipitation amounts of 115 ± 39 cm (45 ± 15 in) 130 ± 27 cm (51 ± 11 in) and 105 ± 47 cm (41 ± 19 in) respectively.

== History and classification ==
The genus was first described by Andersen (2001) from a series of 31 fore and hind wing part-counterpart fossils plus three partial body fossils found in the Fur Formation. Andersen chose the genus name as a combination of the psychopsid families nominal genus Psychops, itself a combination of the Greek words psyche and opsis meaning "butterfly" and "appearance", with the Latin word palaeo meaning "old". Andersen designated Palaeopsychops latifasciatus as the type species, and named three other species in the same paper, Palaeopsychops abruptus, Palaeopsychops angustifasciatus, and Palaeopsychops maculatus. Of the study material, the holotype specimens of all four species, along with paratypes for P. abruptus and P. angustifasciatus were deposited in the Geological Museum, University of Copenhagen. The four holotypes plus P. abruptus paratype 1 were all declared by Andersen as danekræ, specimens of high scientific value to the Danish. Additional paratype fossils were spread out between a number of collections including the Fur Museum on Fur Island, the Moler Museum on Mors Island and private collections in Nykøbing Mors Denmark and in Germany.

The fifth species, Palaeopsychops dodgeorum, was described by Makarkin and Archibald (2003) two years later . The holotype hindwing was found at the Coldwater Beds Quilchena site in British Columbia. The only known specimen of the species, was included in the University of Alberta collections at the time of study. Archibald and Makarkin (2006) added five additional species in the genus, bringing to known species count to ten with one additional Danish species Palaeopsychops quadratus, and four Okanagan Highlands species. Palaeopsychops douglasae added a second species from Quilchena, while one species Palaeopsychops setosus was described from the more northern Horsefly shales site and two species Palaeopsychops marringerae and Palaeopsychops timmi were detailed from the southern most Klondike Mountain Formation in Washington.

Andersen (2001) placed the new genus into the family Psychopsidae based on the large size of the wings, the dense vein structure, and his interpretation that the subcosta (Sc), anterior radial trace (R1), and anterior sectoral trace (R2) veins merged near the wing apex forming a vena triplica structure. As such, Andersen placed the genus within the psychopsids, while noting at the time the species were larger than any other member species and notably similar to the Florissant Formation species Polystoechotites piperatus, which was placed in the psychopsid family at the time as "Propsychopsis" piperatus. Makarkin and Archibald (2003) called the psychopsid into question based on examination of the P. latifasciatus images in the type description and the venation of P. douglasae. While the R1 and Sc veins do merge into a single vein, they determined the R2 did not merge with them. Instead the R2 runs parallel to the other two and then to the fused vein and separately terminates at the wing margin. As such, it lacked the key venation character that unites the psychopsids. After examining all described neuropteran families they tentatively placed the genus within the "giant lacewing" family Polystoechotidae. With the addition of the 2006 species and description of the form genus Polystoechotites Archibald and Makarkin reaffirmed the placement of Palaeopsychops within the family Polystoechotidae and noted the fore-wing species fall into two informal groups the "European" and "North American" groups. They were hesitant to place strong weight on the groupings as the scattered crossveins uniting the three North American species is a character seen in other Ithonid genera from North America. Winterton and Makarkin (2010) documented phylogenetic and morphological analysis of the families Ithonidae and Polystoechotidae in which the two families were found to form a monophyletic clade. Due to several of the traditional ithonidae genera forming a sister group within the polystoechotid genera and a lack of characters specific to only one family or the other, Winterton and MAkarkin merged the two into a single expanded Ithonidae family. Subsequent to the expansion of Ithionidae an overview of the family was given by Zheng et al (2016) in which they informally grouped the genera into three genus groups, the Ithonid genus group, the Polystoechotid genus-group, and the Rapismatid genus group, with Palaeopsychops placed in the Polystoechotid genus-group.

== Species ==
Paleopsychops is distinguished from other polystoechotid group genera by a number of characters mainly seen in the fore-wings, though one character is distinct to the hind-wings. The fore-wings of Paleopsychops have a broadly subtriangular outline, while other genera are more elongated and have a length to width ratio of greater than 2.5. The rear margins of the fore-wings are not falcate, while the genus Fontecilla does have a falcate rear margin. Most genera have a MA vein which forks, but in Paleopsychops the basal end of the MA is fused with the Rs1. The MP vein of both the fore and hind-wings notably forks into multiple closely spaced elongate branches, a feature seen in the extinct Jurassic Pterocalla fore-wing, but rare in other genera. The fore-wings range between 29–45 mm (1.1–1.8 in) in length and between 13.5–21 mm (0.53–0.83 in) in width resulting in length/width ratios between 2.14 and 2.40. As with many neuropteran genera, trichosors are often present along the rear margins of the wings though preservation makes it hard to identify if it is specific to certain Paleopsychops species or uniform for the genus. None of the specimens described have a sufficiently preserved basal area of the wing to detect the absence or presence of a basal nygma, however in at least some of the species an apical nygma is present, located between the Rs1 and Rs2 veins. The hind-wings range between 40–42 mm (1.6–1.7 in) long and 17–19 mm (0.67–0.75 in) wide, giving a less subtriangular outline than the forewings. While the hind-wings do not show nygmata, there are trichosors and a coupling apparatus near the wing base typical of polystoechotid group species. The apparatus, used for gripping to the fore-wings in flight, has a frenulum composed of long setae.

Archibald and Makarkin (2006) made note of the possibility that some of the perceived species diversity found in Paleopsychops could be a result of species description from isolated wings combined with sexual dimorphism in wing colorpatterning. They noted specifically the Okanagan Highlands species pair P. dodgeorum + P. marringerae along with the Danish pairs P. latifasciatus + P. abruptus and P. angustifasciatus +'P. quadratus. Given the incomplete nature of the fossils however and that dimorphic color pattering is not known in the polystoechotid group genera, the likelihood of this possibility is small.

=== P. abruptus ===
P. abruptus, of the Fur Formation, is the only Paleopsychops in which body material has been found. The name chosen by Andersen (2001) is from the Latin abruptus which means disconnected, a reference to the dark color bands which are interrupted by the clear subcostal space as it runs the wing length. The antennae as preserved show a short scape but the full length and additional structures of the antennae are missing. The maxillary palpi are preserved, consisting of five segments that terminate in a pointed fifth segment. The legs have coatings of short dense setae on the coxa and fore femurs. There are also short upright setae on the upper surface of the thorax. The forewings are estimated to be between 38–44 mm (1.5–1.7 in) long and 16–19 mm (0.63–0.75 in), while the length of the hind wings is unreported. The coloration of the wings is mostly clear, with three narrow longitudinal dark bands that are interrupted by a hyaline subcostal space. The wings also have numerous small setae running along the wing venation, a feature not seen in the other Danish species, though Archibald and Makarkin (2006) note the lack of setae is possibly due to the preservation of specimens in coarser or finer sediments. Both the P. abruptus paratype which has setae, and the P. setosus holotype are fossilized in "unusually" fine grain matrix, allowing for finer details to be preserved.

=== P. angustifasciatus ===
P. angustifasciatus is one of the Fur Formation fore-wing species whose holotype was recovered from the cementstone at Ejerslev Molergrav, Mors. Andersen (2001) coined the species name angustifasciatus as a combination of the Latin words angustus for "narrow" plus fasciatus meaning banded. Known from at least 11 specimens, the wings range between approximately 29–36 mm (1.1–1.4 in) long and 13.5–15.5 mm (0.53–0.61 in) wide. as with other Danish species, there are no crossveins present in the costal space. The Rs vein branches between 22 and 24 times before termination at the wing margin. The wing coloration is that of a primarily clear membrane with four thin dark stripes. As with P. quadratus three stripes run width wise from fore margin to hind margin and one stripe runs length wise over the outer gradate series of crossveins. However unlike P. quadratus, the inner gradate crossveins are not highlighted with a dark stripe, distinguishing the two species. Within P. angustifasciatus there is variation in the relative distances between the three longitudinal stripes.

=== P. dodgeorum ===
P. dodgeorum is the first of two species described from the Quilchena site in British Columbia, having first been mentioned without formal description by Archibald and Mathewes (2000) and again being referenced without description by Andersen (2001). Makarkin and Archibald (2003) chose the specific name "dodgeorum" as a patronym in honor of Ken Dodge and his son Kenneth Dodge the collectors of the type specimen, which they subsequently donated to Simon Fraser University. At the tine of description the two major characters separating it from the 4 European species were its lack of an inner gradate series of crossveins, a feature in all the Danish species, and its slightly more elongated outline. The wing is 45 mm (1.8 in) long with faintly preserved dark toned spots throughout the membrane becoming distinct oblique banding in the costal margin and the over the outer gradate series. The hind margin sports faintly preserved trichosors and a distal nygma is present between the forks of the Rs vein, as seen in other species.

=== P. douglasae ===
P. douglasae was described from the holotype hindwing collected by paleoichthyologist Mark Wilson from the Quilchena locality. Archibald & Makarkin (2006) picked the specific epithet as a matronym honoring Sheila Douglas for her paleoentomology work on British Columbian fossils. The part side of the holotype is broken into two sections with areas of the midwing and wing base missing, and little color patterning visible. The counterpart is better preserved, showing distinct color patterning and more of the cross-venation in the dark-colored area of the color-pattern. The dark coloration is centered as a u-shaped patch in the central portion of the wing, lightening in tone near the rear wing margin, lacking any coloration at the wing base and apex excepting a very thin strip of darkening along the apical margin. The wing is 42 mm (1.7 in) by 19 mm (0.75 in) at the widest point, with a distinctly undulant rear margin, a trait that appears rarely in neuropteran species. The undulations of the rear margin give a slightly falcate outline to the wing apex.

=== P. latifasciatus ===
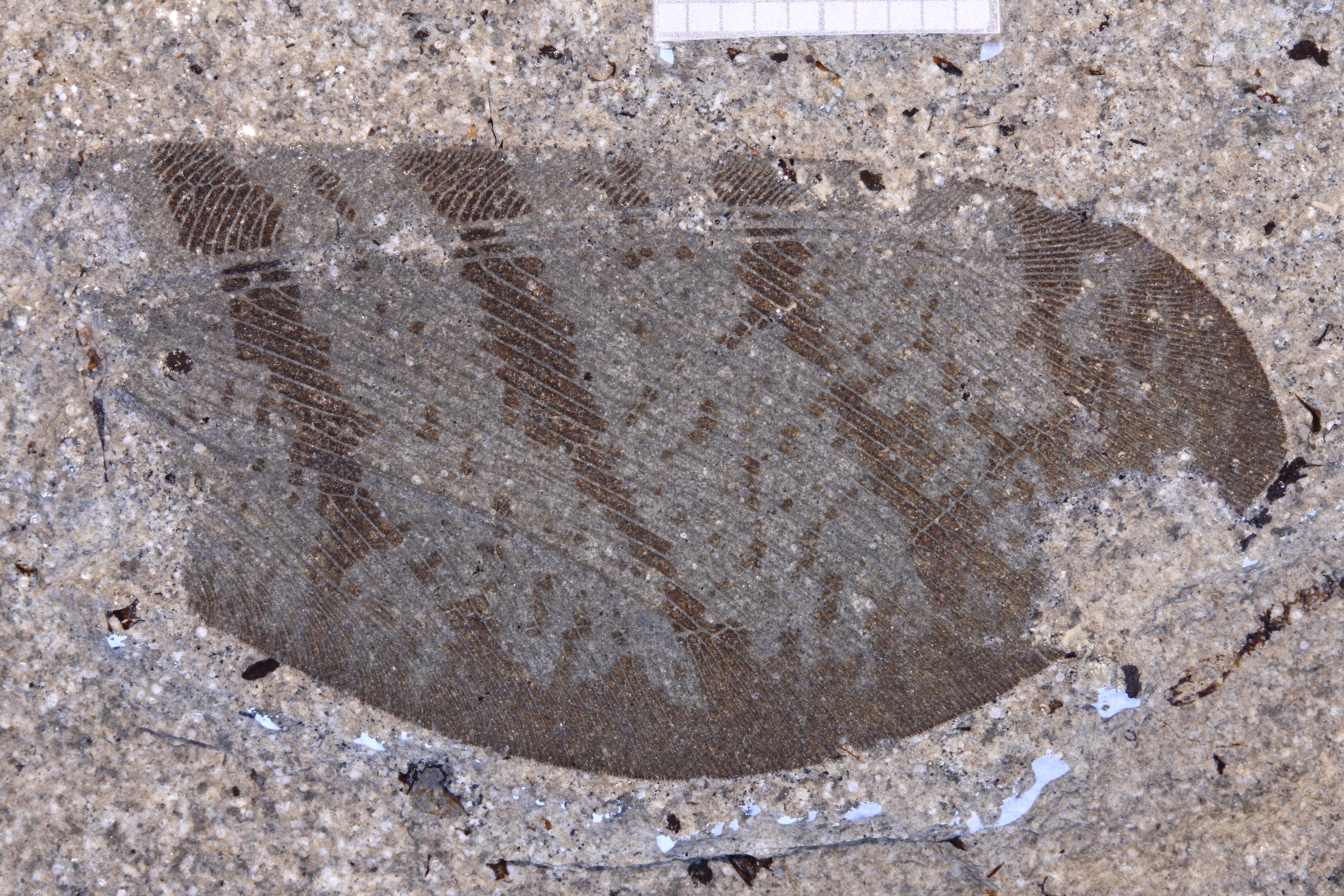
Palaeopsychops latifasciatus from the Early Eocen Fur Formation

P. latifasciatus is one of the Fur Formation species group, being described by Andersen (2001) from a holotype and several paratype forewings. The name was derived from a combination of the Latin words latus meaning "broad" and fasciatus meaning "banded". The forewings range between 3.7–4.4 cm (1.5–1.7 in) in length, and are just over twice as long as they are at the widest point. The preserved color pattering shows a trio of broad straight dark toned stripes crossing the wing at an oblique angle. A fourth dark stripe is present near the wing apex, though it is not distinctly separated from the dark patterning of the posteroapical border. Additional dashes and spots of dark tone are spread across the wing, with the heaviest concentration in the costal space between the larger color bands.

While the wings are similar to those of P. abruptus the crossveins in the costal space and the broad dark tone stripes passing through the subcostal and R1 spaces.

=== P. maculatus ===
P. maculatus is the only Danish species described from a hindwing, though it was first interpreted as a fore wing by Andersen (2001). The holotype was collected by Henrik Madsen from the Ejerslev Molergrav locality of the Fur Formation on Mors, and is complete though indistinctly preserved. Andersen (2001) selected the Latin maculata, meaning "spotted" for the origin of the specific name noting the distinctly different color patterning if it compared to the other three Danish species at the time. The darkened area is concentrated in the center region of the wing with the lower margin following the outer gradate series and narrow dark stripes extending from the central region upwards towards the upper margin crossing the subcostal space. The remainder of the wing lightens to clear along the base, margins, and apex. The wing is 17.5 mm (0.69 in) wide by 40 mm (1.6 in) long with no visible trichosors or nygmata. While the wing is similar in color pattern and proportions to P. setosus, the inner gradate crossveins are placed closer to the outer gradate series, and the basal area of the wing is notably wider than that of P. setosus. Archibald and Makarkin (2006) noted that P. maculatus and P. latifasciatus might be one species, based on the similar coloration of the darkened stripes when they cross the subcostal space. However since P. latifasciatus is known only from fore wings while P. maculatus is known only from a hind wing, the species status remains speculative until articulated fore and hind wings are found.

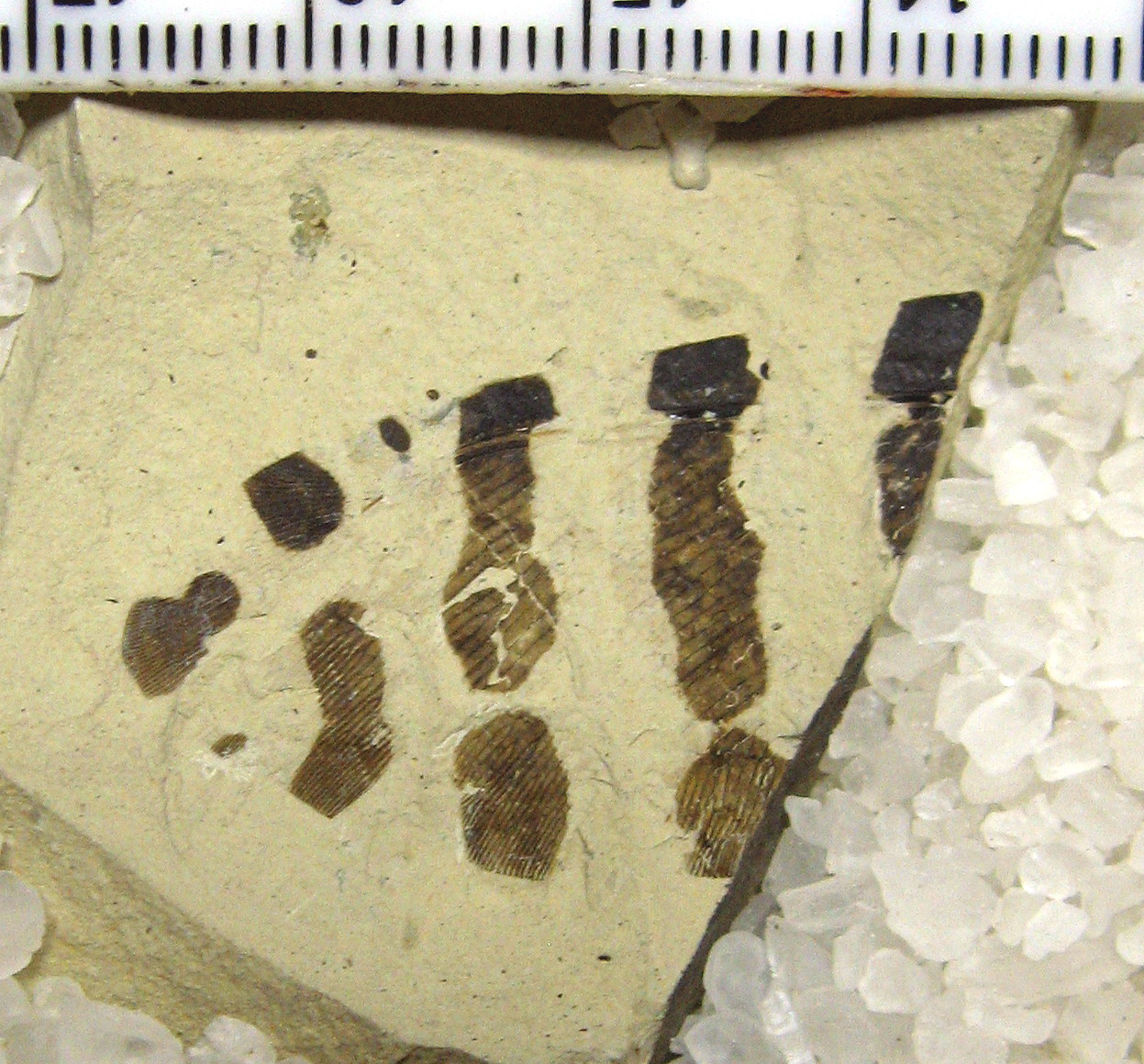
Palaeopsychops marringerae Holotype SR 97-08-05

=== P. marringerae ===
P. marringerae was described from a partial fore-wing collected by Regina Marringer from the Klondike Mountain Formation site, B4131. Archibald and Makarkin (2006)chose the species epithet as a matronym recognizing Marringer for finding the fossil and donating it to the Stonerose Interpretive Center. A fore-wing species, it is known from the apical 2/3 of the wing with the fossil being 33 mm (1.3 in) by 20 mm (0.79 in) wide. It is estimated the complete wings would have been approximately 45 mm (1.8 in) and 20.5–21 mm (0.81–0.83 in). The wing shows very distinct color patterning, with alternating bands of clear and dark bands running across the wing at a perpendicular angle to the upper wing margin. The color pattern is the most notable distinguishing feature between the species and P. dodgeorum which has similar venation and shape. P. marringerae is notable for the inner gradate series of crossveins not being present, with scattered crossveins present in the radial space instead. As preserved the trichosors are indistinctly visible, and no nygmata are present.

=== P. quadratus ===
P. quadratus is known from a Fur Formation part and counterpart fore-wing fossil found on Ejerslev Molergrav, Mors which was originally designated by Andrsen (2001) as "paratype 1" of the species P.angustifasciatus. Archibald and Makarkin (2006) separated the specimen out as a new species based on color patterning and wing size, choosing the specific name based on the Latin adjective quadratus, which means "square", in reference to the distinct shape formed by the dark stripes. The wing is incomplete, with a preserved length of 37 mm (1.5 in), an estimated total size of approximately 42 mm (1.7 in) by 19 mm (0.75 in) wide. the wing shows faintly preserved trichosors, and a distal nygma between the Rs1 and Rs2 veins. The majority of the wing membrane is clear with five thin dark stripes for colorpatterning, three stripes running width wise from front margin to hind margin, and two running across the inner and outer gradate series crossveins, forming a square window of hyaline or light toned membrane in the center of the wing. There are also scattered dark spots and small stripes between the inner gradate series and the wing edge. The distinct latitudinal striping on the crossveins combined with the longer overall size of the P. quadratus wing distinguish the species.

=== P. setosus ===
P. setosus is described from a single hindwing found in the Horsefly Shales and described by Archibald and Makarkin (2006), who named the species from the Latin setosus meaning bristly or hairy. the wing is 17 mm (0.67 in) wide by 40 mm (1.6 in) long with a length/width ratio of 2.35. Overall the wing membrane is dark in color tone lightening along the margins and at the apex and preserved section of the base. The color patterning and proportions of the wing are notably similar to the Danish P. maculatus, though P. setosus has a larger distance between the inner gradate crossvein series, and the outer gradate series, and also by the narrower basal section of the wing. The wing does not have preserved nygmata or marginal trichosors, but a dense region of the wings basal area is covered in a setose band. The band is dominated by 0.15–0.30 mm (0.0059–0.0118 in) long macrotrichia which uniformly cover the region with no differentiation when crossing veins. The upper margin of the bands is indistinct grading from sparse to denser setal covering, while the lower band margin ends abruptly with the longest setae present of the band. The P. setosus setae band is distinct among the ithonids, and long setation is only seen in the living families Ascalaphidae and Sialidae. Within the Neuropteran fossil record, long dense setae is seen in the families Parakseneuridae and Kalligrammatidae. Only one other Palaeopsychops species, P. abruptus is noted for having wing setation, though in that species the hairs are confined to the wing venation.

=== P. timmi ===
P. timmi was described from a partial left fore-wing collected by Thomas Timm from site B4131 of the Klondike Mountain Formation site. Archibald and Makarkin (2006) chose the species epithet as a patronym recognizing Timm for finding the fossil and donating it to the Stonerose Interpretive Center. A fore-wing species, it is known from the basal 2/3 of the wing with the fossil being 37 mm (1.5 in) by 20 mm (0.79 in) wide. It is estimated the complete wings would have been approximately 43–44 mm (1.7–1.7 in) and 20 mm (0.79 in). The wing shows very distinct color patterning, having a uniformly dark apical wing area, with scattered spots and two short stripes present in the upper region of the basal area, the majority of the wing base being clear. The color pattern is the most notable distinguishing feature between the species and all of the other described fore-wing species. P. timmi is notable for the inner gradate series of crossveins not being indistinctly formed and with numerous scattered crossveins present in the radial space. The outer gradate series of crossveins are well aligned from the hind margin though the wing before scattering in the cubital space. As preserved the trichosors are indistinctly visible, and no nygmata are present.
