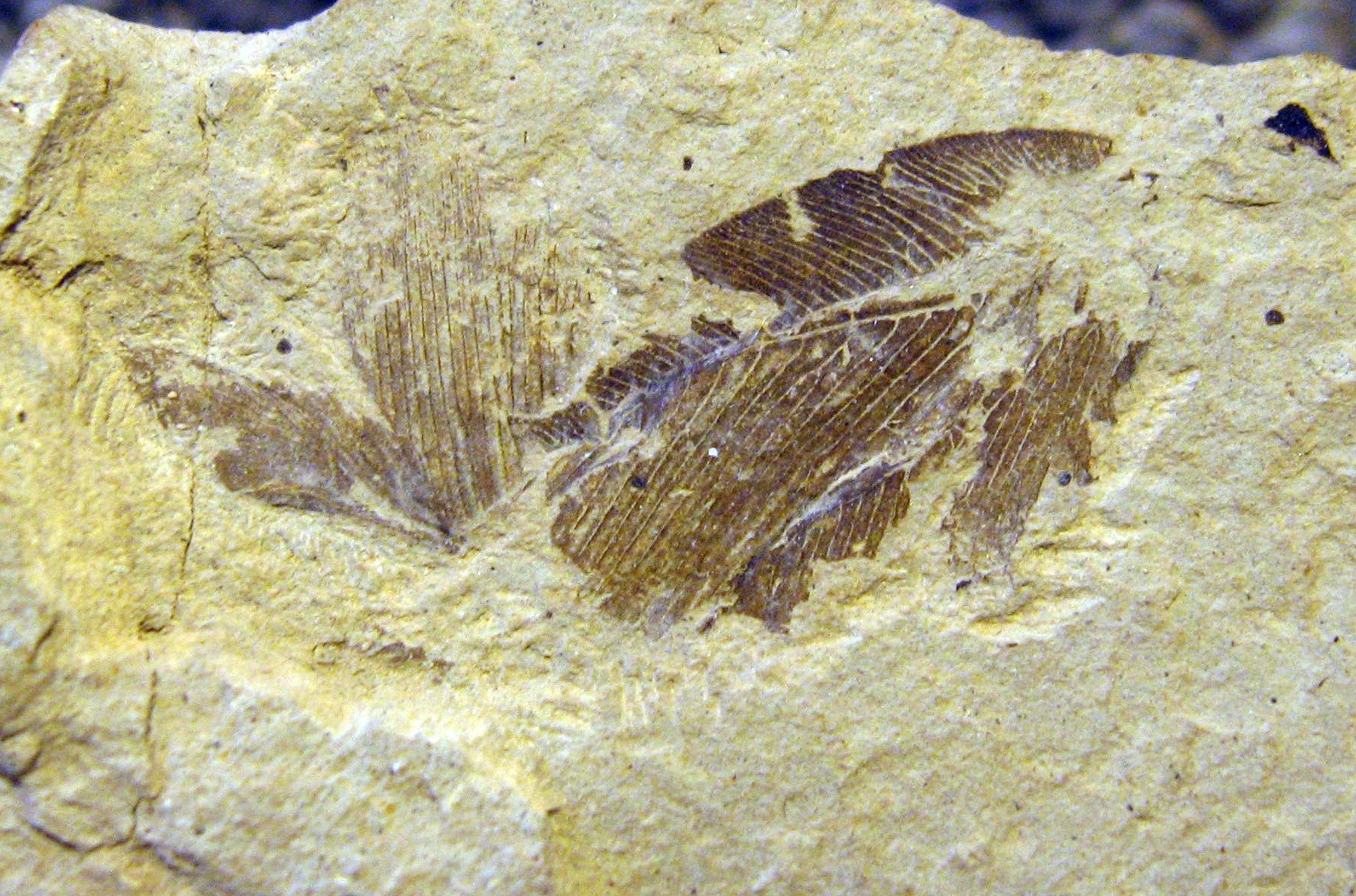
- Polystoechotites barksdalae holotype SRIC SR 97-03-09 A

Scientific classification
- Kingdom: Animalia
- Phylum: Arthropoda
- Clade: Pancrustacea
- Class: Insecta
- Order: Neuroptera
- Family: Ithonidae
- Genus: †Polystoechotites; Archibald & Makarkin, 2006

Species
- Polystoechotites piperatus (Cockerell 1908); Polystoechotites barksdalae Archibald & Makarkin, 2006; Polystoechotites falcatus Archibald & Makarkin, 2006; Polystoechotites lewisi Archibald & Makarkin, 2006; Polystoechotites "sp. A"; Polystoechotites "sp. B"

= Polystoechotites =

Polystoechotites Temporal range: 54.52–49.5 Ma Ypresian

Extinct genus of lacewings

Polystoechotites is an extinct parataxon of lacewings in the moth lacewing family Ithonidae. The taxon is a collective group for fossil polystechotid giant lacewing species whose genus affiliation is uncertain, but which are distinct enough to identify as segregate species. Polystoechotites species are known from Eocene fossils found in North America and is composed of four named species Polystoechotites barksdalae, Polystoechotites falcatus, Polystoechotites lewisi, and Polystoechotites piperatus, plus two unnamed species. Three of the described species are known from fossils recovered from the Eocene Okanagan Highlands of Washington State, while the fourth is from Colorado.

== History and classification ==
Theodore Dru Alison Cockerell named the first species in 1908 as Polystoechotes piperatus, placing the fossil species into the living western hemisphere genus Polystoechotes, which is found in montane regions of North and South America. When Frank Carpenter re-examined the fossil in the early 1940s he concluded, based on the breadth of the costal region that the fossil was likely an osmylid lacewing and transferred the species to the extinct genus Propsychopsis as Propsychopsis piperatus. This placement was retained by Ellis MacLeod (1970) who reviewed and updated the Baltic Amber psychopsids. Generic placement of the species was again questioned in 2003, when Vladimr Makarkin & S. Bruce Archibald reviewed the fossil record of Polystoechotidae in conjunction with placement of the lacewing genus Palaeopsychops into the family and description of a new species.

Three years later, Archibald and Makarkin (2006) described a larger polystechotid fauna from the Eocene Okanagan Highlands, detailing seven named species and two unnamed species. Three of the species named, plus the two described but unnamed species were placed into a "parataxon" named Polystoechotites. Taxa placed within the parataxon were all considered by Archibald and Makarkin to belong to the family Polystoechotidae, the "giant lacewings", but due to preservation quality or incompleteness of the fossil, could not be placed into an already described genus, or confidently be given a new genus. Each was considered identifiable as a species based on both the vein structure of the wings, using the Comstock–Needham system, and the preserved color patterning. As a form taxon, the parataxon Polystoechotites was not given a formal taxonomic description, and Archibald and Makarkin acknowledged it would contain an artificial grouping of species, rather than true monophyletic clade.

At the time of naming, Polystoechotites Polystoechotidae was treated by entomologists as a separate family of lacewings. however in 2010 the family Polystoechotidae was merged into the "moth lacewing" family Ithonidae, with the polystoechotids treated as an internal clade based on molecular phylogenic analysis.

== Description ==
As a parataxon, the Polystoechotites parataxon was not given a specific description, however each of the referred species were given unique descriptions, pending more complete specimens being found.

=== Polystoechotites piperatus ===
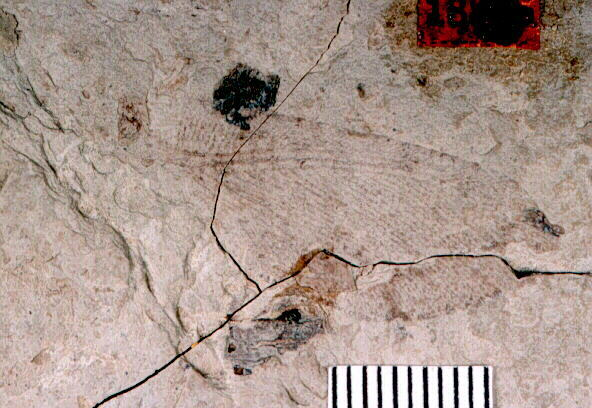
Polystoechotites piperatus holotype

P. piperatus is known from the holotype forewing which has a slightly elongated and possibly sub-triangular in outline. As preserved the length is approximately 27 mm (1.1 in) and approximately 12.5 mm (0.49 in) wide, with an estimated full length around 31 mm (1.2 in). There appear to be no nygmata present on the wing membrane, but there are indistinctly preserved trichosors. The preserved coloration indicates the wings were mainly of a light color or clear, with a mottling of small dark spots. Larger and more distinct dark coloration is found along the outer hind margin of the wing and overlaying the outer gradate series of cross-veins.

The coastal space has its maximum width near the wing base before shrinking to its narrowest near the junction of the subcosta (Sc) and radius (R_{1}) veins, apically of which it widens out again. While the subcostal vein structure is not well preserved, what is visible indicates that likely no cross-veins were present in the costal space. Both the subcosta and radius have a distinctive bend near the wing base which distinguishes the species from other polystechotids. The radial sector (Rs) forks from the radius near the wing base, and apically produces 16 pectinate veins, of which four fork near the Rs branching. The anterior cubitus (CuA) vein also branches, generating between five and seven long veins. Due to the incomplete nature of the fossil margin, both the posterior cubitus (CuP) and anal (A) veins are missing.

=== Polystoechotites barksdalae ===
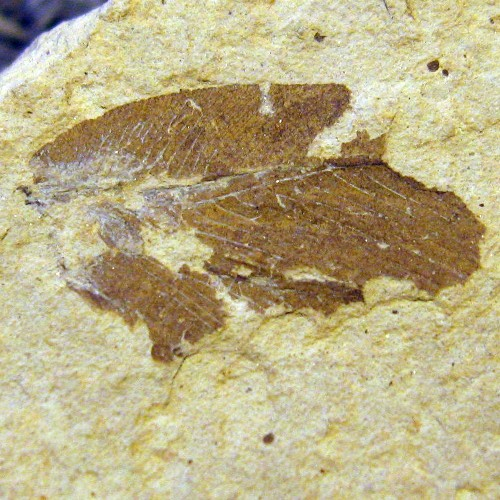
P. barksdalae Holotype counterpart side

P. barksdalae was described from the holotype, a torn and damaged forewing collected from the Klondike Mountain Formations "Boot Hill site" by Lisa Barksdale, along with a fragment of wing tentatively assigned to the species collected from the same site. Both the holotype, SR 97-03-09 A&B, and the additional fossil, SR 01-01-14, were housed in the collections of the Stonerose Interpretive Center at the time of description. The specific name barksdalae was selected as a matronym recognizing Barksdales extensive and valuable contributions, as both collections manager and Curator of Stonerose, in furthering Republic, Washington paleontology. The uniformly dark coloration of the wing membrane combined with the two regular gradate series of crossveins in the radial sector and a lack of any gradate crossvein series in the costal space distinguish the species from other polystoechotids. Based on the preserved characters of the two specimens, it was noted the species may be a species of Palaeopsychops, but the uniform dark wing color, and fragmentary nature of the known fossils leaves open doubt about that placement.

Archibald and Makarkin estimated the holotype wing would have been approximately 35–40 mm (1.4–1.6 in) long by 13–15 mm (0.51–0.59 in) wide if whole, based on the preserved length of about 30 mm (1.2 in) and the widest area of the base present at about 12 mm (0.47 in). In contrast, based on the preserved section of the referred specimen, 48 mm × 6 mm (1.89 in × 0.24 in), Archibald and Makarkin estimated its total wing length to have been between 50–54 mm (2.0–2.1 in). Unlike P. piperatus, a nygmata is present in the distal region of the wing, between the Rs1 and Rs2 veins. Trichosors are also present, being located along the preserved costal wing margin, though the rest of the wing margin is missing. Both specimens show the same uniformly dark wing membrane coloration, with the holotype further displaying the venation having a pale color tone.

In the holotype, the branched humeral veinlet is recurrent. The costal space reaches its widest point between 1/5 to 1/4 of the length from the wing apex, while narrowing both basally and apically from that point. Three of the four identified costal crossveins are present in the proximal region of the costal space and the fourth is located more distally. The subcostal veinlets are all forked before reaching the wing margin.The Radial space has two separate series of regular gradate crossveins, one closer to the outer wing margin and one placed further into the wing center. Additionally there are a few scattered and isolated crossveins on the proximal side of the inner gradate crossveins.

The referred specimen shows a costal area that is wide basally, narrows near the juncture of the Sc and R_{1} veins, and then flares out slightly again, unlike the holotype. While the holotype has four costal crossveins, there are approximately ten identifiable on SR 01-01-14, split evenly between the distal and proximal regions of the costal space. The majority of the subcostal, R_{1} and radial spaces are absent from the fossil fragment.

=== Polystoechotites falcatus ===
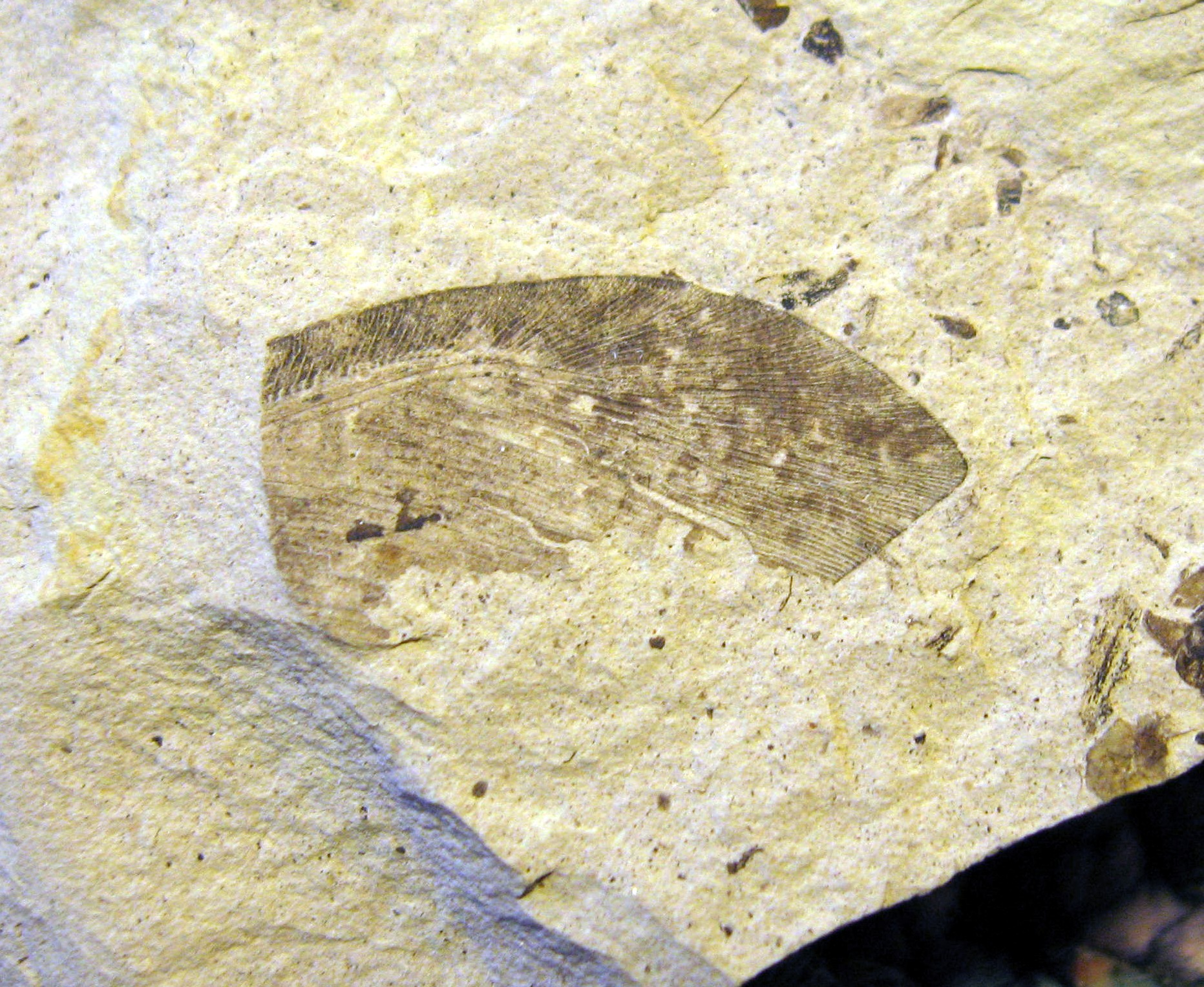
Polystoechotites falcatus Holotype

Also known from a single holotype specimen, Polystoechotites falcatus was found at the "corner lot site", location A0307. They derived the species name falcatus from the Latin "falcatus" meaning greatly curved. Due to the R_{1} space being narrower than the subcostal space, Archibald and Makarkin considered the partial fossil of P. falcatus as a fore-wing. They also noted the similarity between the species and the living Fontecilla graphicus found in Chile based on the color pattering, general venation, and gross wing shape. However, due to incomplete nature of the fossil, they were not able to determine if the species was indeed a member of Fontecilla or if the similarity was due to convergence of wing shape. The species is distinguished from other polystoechotids with falcate wings by the color patterning and venation. In F. graphicus the costal space is mainly lighter colored, while in Palaeopsychops douglasae the radial space is mostly dark in coloration both conditions are opposite in P. falcatus.

The preserved and present fragment of the holotype is an estimated 20 mm (0.79 in) long by about 10 mm (0.39 in) wide. Based on this, Archibald and Makarkin gave an estimated whole wing size of between 40–45 mm (1.6–1.8 in) long and 15 mm (0.59 in) wide with a preserved falcate apical region. they make no mention of nygmata being present, while noting the entire wing margin, as preserved, to be lined with trichosors, becoming indistinct only along the costal margin. The coloration is composed of variegated light and dark patches in the distal costal space plus apical area of the wing. In the known basal costal space the variegation transitions to fully darkened membrane, while the known radial, R_{1} and subcostal areas are light toned.

=== Polystoechotites lewisi ===
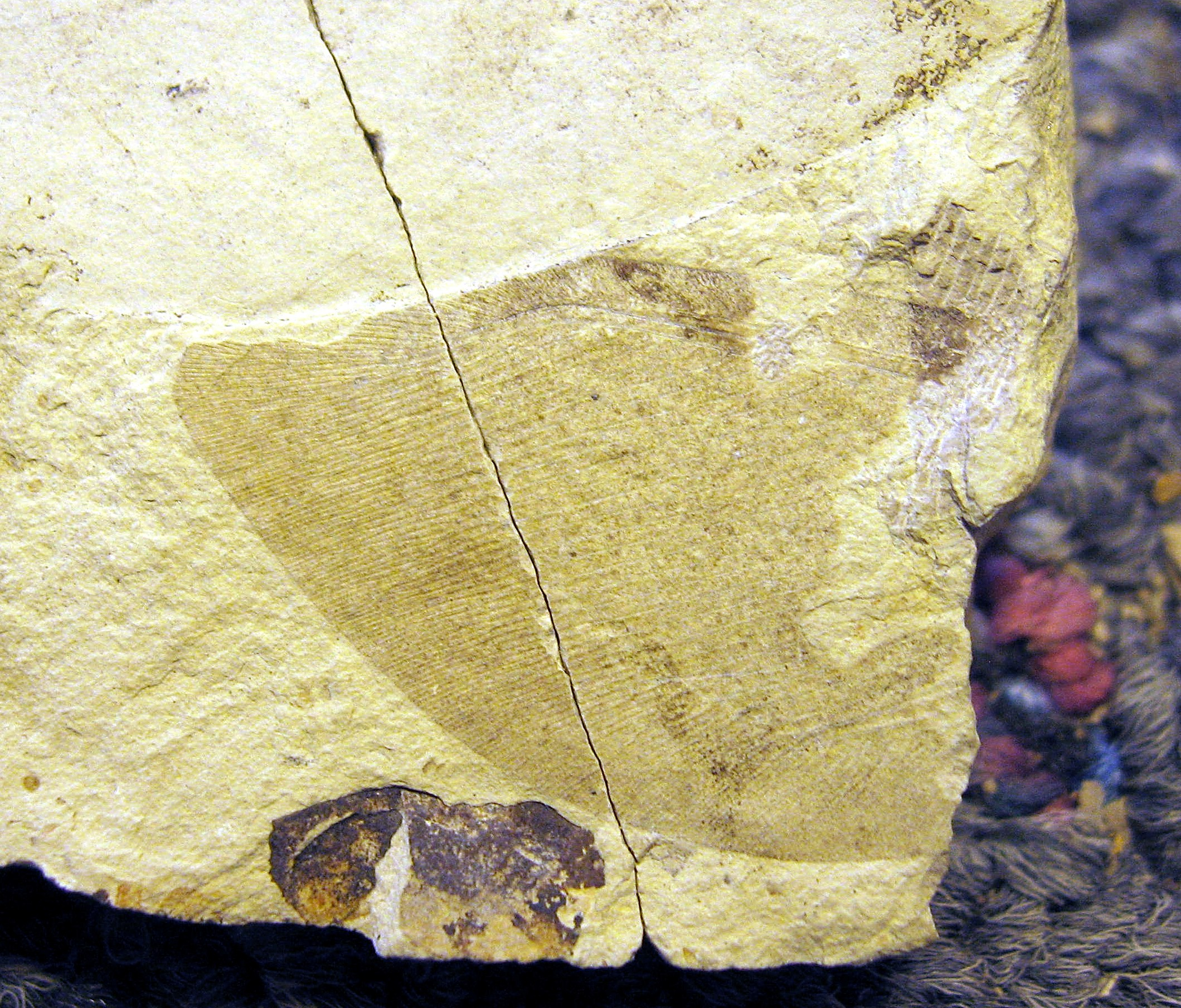
Polystoechotites lewisi Holotype, counterpart

P. lewisi was described from the holotype specimen, which is deposited into two separate institution collections. The part side, SCSU-SR-0316, is retained in the St. Cloud State University collections in St. Cloud, Minnesota, while the counterpart side, SR 01-01-06, is housed at the Stonerose Interpretive Center. The fossil preserves the apical section of a hind-wing that was collected from the "Corner Lot site" in Republic by Standley Lewis. Archibald and Makarkin chose the species name lewisi as a patronym honoring Lewis for his role in pioneering insect research at Republic, and for his wider contributions to palaeoentomology. In almost all aspects the wing is match to the hindwings of Palaeopsychops species, however Archibald and Makarkin opted to place the species into Polystoechotites due to two character states of the P. lewisi wing that are contrary to all other polystoechotids. In the basal area of the subcostal space a number of crossveins are present, and the crossveins in the R_{1} space are fully perpendicular to the R_{1}. No other polystoechotid lacewing genera show this set of characters, and they are augmented by the less distinctly curved pre-apical margin of the wing, which is more pronounced in Palaeopsychops. Archibald and Makarkin deemed the crossveination characters insufficient to name a new genus, but enough to exclude the species from Palaeopsychops.

Estimating from the preserved proportions of the fossil, 26 mm (1.0 in) long by 18 mm (0.71 in) wide, Archibald and Makarkin estimated the hind-wing would have been approximately 18 mm (0.71 in) wide at most and between 42–44 mm (1.7–1.7 in) in maximum length in life. No mention of nygmata is made in the type description but trichorsors are present along the wing venation, and absent from the wing membrane. The macrotrichia are present along the longitudinal veins of the wing, being longer and denser in the anterior region, getting much shorter and sparser in the posterior region. The preserved section of the wing is dark in tone with the exception of a single light or clear spot along the anterior margin area, while there are indications that the basal section of the wing was light to hyaline in coloration.

Unlike in P. barksdalae, the R_{1} and subcostal spaces are evenly proportioned, being of similar widths. There seven crossveins in the subcostal space and four in the R_{1} space, a higher frequency then in other species. The R_{s} vein has 31 branches, 28 of which are each unforked until passing the outer gradate series of crossveins, at which point they dichotomously fork several times each. Additionally the apical most three branches of the R_{s} each dichotomously branch.

=== Polystoechotites "Sp. A" ===
Polystoechotites "Sp. A" is known from an isolated fore-wing fragment plus an almost full and well preserved fore wing, both of which were recovered from the Coldwater Beds Quilchena site. The full wing shows a distinct triangular outline due to its unusually broad profile that distinguishes it from the similarly color patterned species Palaeopsychops dodgeorum and P. marringerae. At the time of description only the smaller wing fragment, specimen Q-0379, was physically studied. The more complete specimen, Q-0421, was collected in 1992 and deposited in the Simon Fraser University paleontology collections being figured in Archibald and Mathewes (2000). However, by the time Archibald and Makarkin were preparing to study fossils for their 2006 paper, the specimen had been lost, and thus the descriptive work for the species diagnosis was accomplished based on examination of existing photographs. Due to Q-0421 going missing, Archibald and Makarkin decided that they could not formally name the taxon, and instead used the informal name Polystoechotites "Sp. A".

Specimen Q-0379 is very fragmentary, with only 13 mm (0.51 in) of the wing present, while Q-0421 was a complete wing 47 mm (1.9 in) long by 28 mm (1.1 in) wide. The wing has one preserved nygma, present in the expanded region between the Rs_{1} and Rs_{2} veins, and trichosors are preserved along the apical margin of the wing at least. The color-patterning consists of thin alternating dark and light stripes running across the wing membrane from the leading edge to the hind edge where the bands change to rounded patches straddling the wing margin. The costal space is narrow at the base before widening for the quarter of its length between base and apical area. It widens again notably after the possibly fusion point of the R_{1} and Sc veins near the wing tip. A well developed outer gradate series of crossveins is present, and numerous additional cross veins are scattered in the radial space. The Rs vein has approximately 23 branches, and the R_{1} has five preserved crossveins. Unlike other species placed in Polystoechotites, there are no preserved crossveins in the subcostal area.

=== Polystoechotites "Sp. B" ===
Polystoechotites "Sp. B" is known from a single poorly fossilized specimen found at Quilchena that consists of a partial pair of overlaid fore-wings. The fragments are 22 mm (0.87 in) long and only 8 mm (0.31 in) wide as preserved, and as such Archibald and Makarkin estimated the wings in life to have been approximately 40 mm (1.6 in) long. The wings have a uniform dark coloration similar to P. barksdalae, however it differs in the wider width of the costal space and the likely presence of a costal gradate series of crossveins. While there are only a few scattered costal space crossveins in P. barksdalae, in the proximal costal area at least eleven were seen on one "Sp. B" wing and seven on the other. The section of Rs that is preserved shows only one fork, and only a scattered placement of crossveins. Due to the poor preservation of the fossils, it wasn't possible to tell if some radial spaces areas were densely covered in trichiation, as is seen in Palaeopsychops setosus or if it was just apparent texturing of the wing area during the fossilization process.

== Distribution and paleoenvironment ==
Quilchena and Republic
Republic and Florssant

The majority of Polystoechotites fossils have been recovered from the Eocene Okanagan Highlands in Central British Columbia and northeast central Washington state, with three named species from the Klondike Mountain Formation of Washington, and a further two unnamed species from the Coldwater Beds Quilchena site.

All three Okanagan Highlands sites represent upland lake systems that were surrounded by a warm temperate ecosystem with nearby volcanism. The highlands likely had a mesic upper microthermal to lower mesothermal climate, in which winter temperatures rarely dropped low enough for snow, and which were seasonably equitable. The paleoforest surrounding the lakes have been described as precursors to the modern temperate broadleaf and mixed forests of Eastern North America and Eastern Asia. Based on the fossil biotas the lakes were higher and cooler then the coeval coastal forests preserved in the Puget Group and Chuckanut Formation of Western Washington, which are described as lowland tropical forest ecosystems. Estimates of the paleoelevation range between 0.7–1.2 km (0.43–0.75 mi) higher than the coastal forests. This is consistent with the paleoelevation estimates for the lake systems, which range between 1.1–2.9 km (1,100–2,900 m), which is similar to the modern elevation 0.8 km (0.50 mi), but higher.

Estimates of the mean annual temperature have been derived from climate leaf analysis multivariate program (CLAMP) analysis of the Republic and Quilchena paleofloras, and leaf margin analysis (LMA) of all three paleofloras. The CLAMP results after multiple linear regressions for Republic gave a mean annual temperature of approximately 8.0 °C (46.4 °F), with the LMA giving 9.2 ± 2.0 °C (48.6 ± 3.6 °F). CLAMP results from Quilchena returned the higher 13.3 ± 2.1 °C (55.9 ± 3.8 °F) which was supported by the 14.8 ± 2.0 °C (58.6 ± 3.6 °F) returned from the LMA. LMA of the Horsefly flora returned a mean annual temperature of 10.4 ± 2.2 °C (50.7 ± 4.0 °F). These are lower than the mean annual temperature estimates given for the coastal Puget Group, which is estimated to have been between 15–18.6 °C (59.0–65.5 °F). The bioclimatic analysis for Republic, Quilchena, and Horsefly suggest mean annual precipitation amounts of 115 ± 39 cm (45 ± 15 in) 130 ± 27 cm (51 ± 11 in) and 105 ± 47 cm (41 ± 19 in) respectively.

The Florissant Formation is composed of successive lake deposits resulting from a volcanic debris flow damming a valley. When Polystoechotites piperatus was described, the Florissant Formation was considered to be Miocene in age, based on the flora and fauna preserved. Successive research and fossil descriptions moved the age older and by 1985 the formation had been reassigned to an Oligocene age. Further refinement of the formation's age using radiometric dating of sanidine crystals has resulted in an age of 34.07 million years ago placing the formation in the Priabonian stage of the Late Eocene.

The Florissant paleoforest surrounding the lake has been described as similar to modern southeastern North America, with a number of taxa represented that are now found in the subtropics to tropics and confined to the old world. Harry MacGinitie (1953) suggested a warm temperate climate based on the modern biogeographic relatives of the biota found in the formation. Modern estimates of the paleoelevation range between 1,900–4,133 m (6,234–13,560 ft), notably higher than the original estimates by MacGinitie of 300–900 m (980–2,950 ft). Estimates of the mean annual temperature for the Florissant Formation have been derived from climate leaf analysis multivariate program (CLAMP) analysis and modern forest equivalencies of the paleoflora. The results of the various methods have gaven a mean annual temperature rage between approximately 10.8–17.5 °C (51.4–63.5 °F), while the bioclimactic analysis for suggests mean annual precipitation amounts of 50 cm (20 in).
