= Brutalichnus =

Trace fossil classification
- Ichnogenus: †Brutalichnus; Mikuláš et al., 2006

Type ichnospecies
- Brutalichnus brutalis Mikuláš et al., 2006

Trace fossil

Brutalichnus is an ichnogenus. A case study from the Miocene of the Czech Republic found that Brutalichnus and two other ichnogenera have evidence of biting and gnawing traces on reptilian and mammalian bones. Brutalichnus contains one ichnospecies, Brutalichnus brutalis. The ichnogenera Machichnus and Nihilichnus were described in the same paper.

Wisshak, Knaust & Bertling (2019) consider Brutalichnus to be a nomen dubium.

== See also ==
- Ichnology
