= Nihilichnus =

Trace fossil classification
- Ichnofamily: †Machichnidae
- Ichnogenus: †Nihilichnus; Mikuláš et al., 2006

Type ichnospecies
- Nihilichnus nihilicus Mikuláš et al., 2006

Ichnospecies
- N. nihilicus Mikuláš et al., 2006; N. covichi Rasser et al., 2016; N. fissuratus Lages et al., 2025

Trace fossil

Nihilichnus is an ichnogenus of trace fossil. It was first described from bite traces in 2006. The ichnogenus originally contained two ichnospecies, Nihilichnus nihilicus and Nihilichnus mortalis. The ichnogenera Brutalichnus and Machichnus were described in the same paper.

== See also ==
- Ichnology
