= Coldwater Beds =

Geologic formation in British Columbia, Canada

- Stratigraphic range: Ypresian (Wasatchian); ~51.9–51.1 Ma
- Type: Formation
- Unit of: Kamloops Group
- Sub-units: Merritt & Quilchena coal basins
- Overlies: Nicola Group
- Thickness: 230 m (750 ft)

Lithology
- Primary: Mudstone
- Other: Shale, tuff, coal

Location
- Coordinates: 50.1°N 120.5°W
- Approximate paleocoordinates: 54.8°N 103.5°W
- Region: British Columbia
- Country: Canada
- Extent: Okanagan Highlands

Type section
- Named for: Coldwater River
- Named by: Dawson
- Year defined: 1895
- Coldwater Beds (British Columbia)

The Coldwater Beds are a geologic formation of the Okanagan Highlands in British Columbia, Canada. They preserve fossils dating back to the Ypresian stage of the Eocene period, or Wasatchian in the NALMA classification.

The formation comprises mudstones, shales and tuffs deposited in a lacustrine environment and has provided many insect fossils, as well as indeterminate birds and fossil flora.

== Description ==
The Coldwater Beds were defined by Dawson (1895) based on a section along the Coldwater River in the Okanagan Highlands. The formation reaches a thickness of 230 metres (750 ft), and comprises mudstones, shales and tuff deposited in a lacustrine environment. U-Pb dating of thick tephra, combined with Ar-Ar dates of sanidine from same bed provided an Early Eocene age. The tephra was deposited within insect-bearing shales.

=== Climate ===
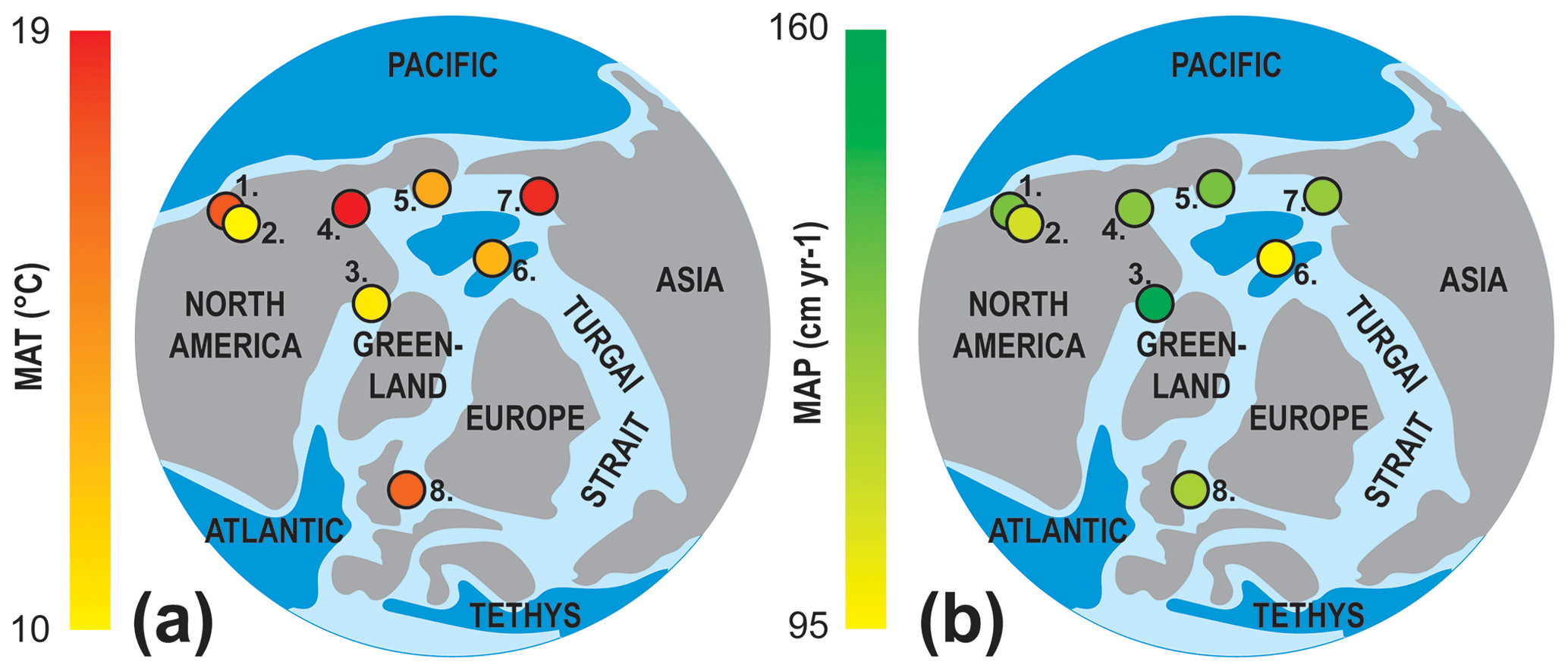
Early Eocene proxy ensemble data from fossil localities showing (a) MAT and (b) MAP estimates with the Coldwater Beds indicated with (2)

During the Early Eocene, the climate of much of northern North America was warm and wet, with mean annual temperatures (MAT) as high as 20 °C (68 °F), mean annual precipitation (MAP) of 100 to 150 centimetres (39 to 59 in), mild frost-free winters (coldest month mean temperature >5 °C (41 °F)), and climatic conditions that supported extensive temperate forest ecosystems.

The Quilchena fossil locality is dated to 51.5 ± 0.4 Ma corresponding to the Early Eocene Climatic Optimum (EECO), and is reconstructed as the warmest and wettest of the Early Eocene upland sites from the Okanagan Highlands of British Columbia and northern Washington State. Mean annual temperature (MAT) is estimated from leaf margin analysis as 16.2 ± 2.1 °C (61.2 ± 3.8 °F) and 14.6 ± 4.8 °C (58.3 ± 8.6 °F). Using bioclimatic analysis of 45 nearest living relatives, a moist mesothermal climate is indicated (MAT 12.7 to 16.6 °C (54.9 to 61.9 °F); cold month mean temperature (CMMT) 3.5 to 7.9 °C (38.3 to 46.2 °F) and mean annual precipitation (MAP) of 103 to 157 centimetres (41 to 62 in)/yr. Leaf size analysis estimates a mean annual precipitation of 121 ± 39 centimetres (48 ± 15 in).

== Fossils ==
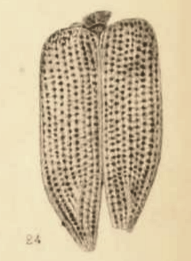
Buprestis saxigena (1890 illustration)

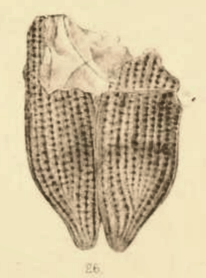
Buprestis sepulta (1890 illustration)

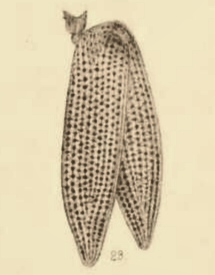
Buprestis tertiaria (1890 illustration)

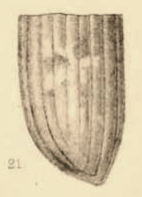
Cercyon? terrigena (1890 illustration)

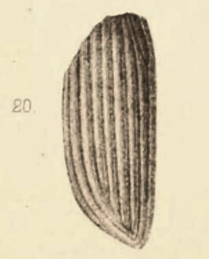
Nebria paleomelas (1890 illustration)

A wide variety of fossils occur in the formation, including abundant fish remains, insects, and plants, and rare occurrences of molluscs, ostracods, and birds:

=== Flora ===
Fossil plants were first reported from the Coldwater Beds at the Quilchena site and nearby by Penhallow (1908) with an expanded taxonomic list given by Mathewes et al (2016).

Pteridophytes

- Azolla

Ginkgophytes

- Ginkgo

Pinophytes

- Abies
- cf Amentotaxus
- Calocedrus
- Chamaecyparis
- Glyptostrobus
- Keteleeria
- Metasequoia
- Picea
- Pinus
- Pseudolarix
- Sequoia
- Taxodium
- Thuja
- Tsuga

Angiosperms

- Acer
- cf. Aesculus
- †Alnus parvifolia
- †Betula leopoldae
- Bignoniaceae
- †Castaneophyllum
- †Comptonia columbiana
- Cornus
- Corylopsis
- Dipteronia
- cf. Disanthus
- †Eucommia montana
- †Eucommia rolandii
- cf. Exbucklandia
- Fagus
- †Florissantia quilchenensis
- Fraxinus
- Hovenia
- †Joffrea/Nyssidium
- Nyssa
- Pieris
- †Plafkeria
- cf. Pterocarya
- Rhus
- cf. Sambucus
- Sassafras
- Ternstroemia
- cf. Gordonia
- Tilia
- Trochodendron
- †Ulmus okanaganensis

=== Pollen taxa ===
Ginkgophytes

- Ginkgo

Pinophytes

- Picea
- Pinus
- cf Sciadopitys
- Tsuga

Angiosperms

- Alnus
- Carya
- †Liliacidites
- Liquidambar
- †Pistillipollenites mcgregorii
- cf. Platanus
- Pterocarya
- †Sabal ?florisanti
- Tilia
- Ulmus

=== Molluscs ===
Mark Wilson (1987) noted, without taxonomic identification, that unidentified small bivalves are a component of the Quilchena invertebrate paleofauna.

=== Insects ===
The insect fossils studied by Wilson (1987) showed Bibionidae dominating the paleoentemofauna, at 28% of all specimens examined at that time. An additional 13% of the fossils were other dipterans while up to 41% of all insects still had attached wings. The invertebrates trace fossils included two undescribed species of Trichoptera larval cases and burrowing or tracks in the sediment.

Blattaria

- †Diploptera praecisus

Coleoptera

- cf. Amara sp.
- †Buprestis saxigena Scudder, 1879
- †Buprestis sepulta Scudder, 1879
- †Buprestis tertiaria Scudder, 1879
- Carabidae indet.
- †Cercyon? terrigena Scudder, 1879
- Curculionidae indet.
- cf. Erotylidae indet.
- †Nebria paleomelas Scudder, 1879
- Omaliinae indet.
- Pachymerina sp.
- Scarabaeoidea indet.

Dermaptera

- Forficulina indet.

Diptera

- Plecia angustipennis
- Plecia canadensis
- Plecia pictipennis
- Mycetophilidae indet.
- Pipunculidae indet.
- Pipunculinae indet.
- Pleciinae indet.
- Syrphidae indet.
- Tipulidae indet.

Hemiptera

- Telmatrechus defunctus
- Aphididae indet.
- Cercopoidea indet.
- Cicadellidae indet.
- Cydnidae indet.
- Gerridae indet.
- Megymeninae indet.
- cf. Pentatomidae indet.

Hymenoptera

- Eosphecium naumanni
- Halictus? savenyei
- Braconidae indet.
- Formicidae indet.
- Ichneumonidae indet.
- Tenthredinidae indet.
- Trigonalidae indet.
- Vespidae indet.

Mecoptera

- Eorpa jurgeni
- Eorpa sp.
- Panorpoidea sp.

Neuroptera

- Polystoechotites sp.
- Palaeopsychops dodgeorum
- Palaeopsychops douglasae
- Wesmaelius mathewesi

Orthoptera

- Prophalangopsidae indet.

Trichoptera

- Phryganeidae indet.
- Trichoptera indet.

=== Fish ===
- Amia sp. scales
- Amyzon brevipinne

=== Birds ===
- Aves indet. feathers

=== Mammals ===
- Insectivorous mammalian indet. tooth

== Correlations ==
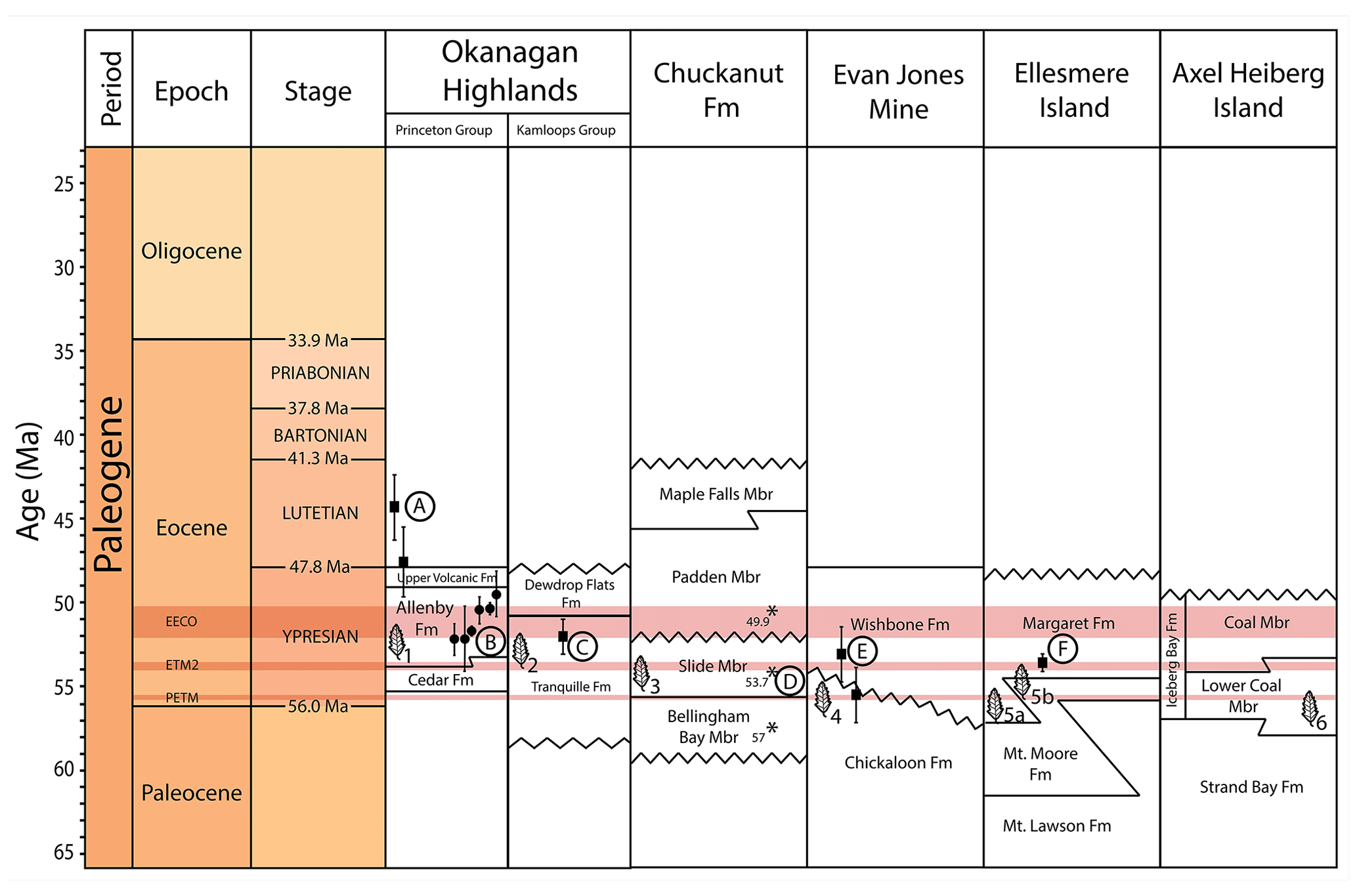
Correlation of the Coldwater Beds with other Early Eocene formations in northern North America

The formation has been correlated with the Eocene Okanagan Highlands floras including the Allenby Formation, Kamloops Group, Horsefly shales, and Driftwood Canyon site of British Columbia, along with the Klondike Mountain Formation of Washington State. Additionally its correlated with the Margaret Formation of Ellesmere Island, Nunavut, the Chickaloon Formation of Alaska, Wishbone, Chuckanut and Iceberg Bay Formations, all of similar age. The flora of the Coldwater Beds has been correlated to the Chu Chua Formation of southeastern British Columbia. The formation also correlates with the Springbrook, Kettle River and O'Brien Creek Formations in Washington, United States.

== See also ==
- List of fossiliferous stratigraphic units in British Columbia
