= Corvitalusoides =

Corvitalusoides Temporal range: Late Oligocene to Early Miocene

Scientific classification
- Kingdom: Animalia
- Phylum: Chordata
- Class: Aves
- Order: Passeriformes
- Suborder: Passeri
- Genus: †Corvitalusoides; Boles, 2006
- Species: †C. grandiculus

Binomial name
- †Corvitalusoides grandiculus Boles, 2006

Extinct genus of birds

Corvitalusoides grandiculus is an extinct species of songbird, in a monotypic genus of uncertain familial affinities, from the Late Oligocene or Early Miocene of northern Australia. It was described from a distal tibiotarsal fragment found at Riversleigh, in the Boodjamulla National Park of north-western Queensland. The bone size indicates that the bird was among the largest of songbirds, within the size range of ravens and lyrebirds.
