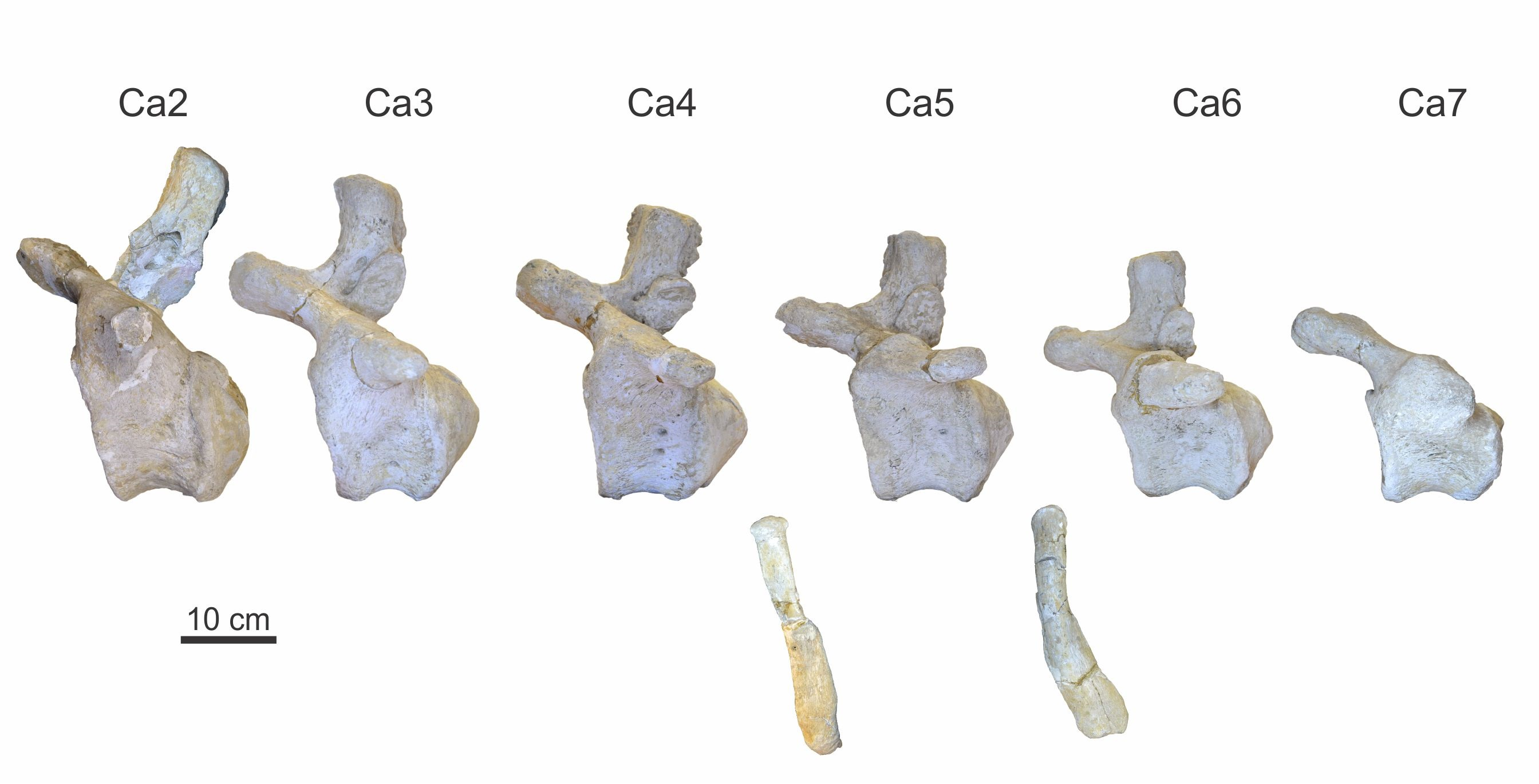
- Adamantisaurus holotype

Scientific classification
- Kingdom: Animalia
- Phylum: Chordata
- Class: Reptilia
- Clade: Dinosauria
- Clade: Saurischia
- Clade: †Sauropodomorpha
- Clade: †Sauropoda
- Clade: †Macronaria
- Clade: †Titanosauria
- Clade: †Lithostrotia
- Genus: †Adamantisaurus; Santucci & Bertini, 2006
- Species: †A. mezzalirai

Binomial name
- †Adamantisaurus mezzalirai Santucci & Bertini, 2006

= Adamantisaurus =

Adamantisaurus Temporal range: Late Cretaceous, 75 Ma

Extinct genus of dinosaurs

Adamantisaurus (/ˌædəˌmæntɪˈsɔːrəs/ AD-ə-MAN-tiss-OR-əs) is a poorly-known genus of titanosaurian sauropod dinosaur from the Late Cretaceous Period of what is now South America. It is only known from six tail vertebrae but, as a sauropod, it can be assumed that this dinosaur was a very large animal with a long neck and tail.

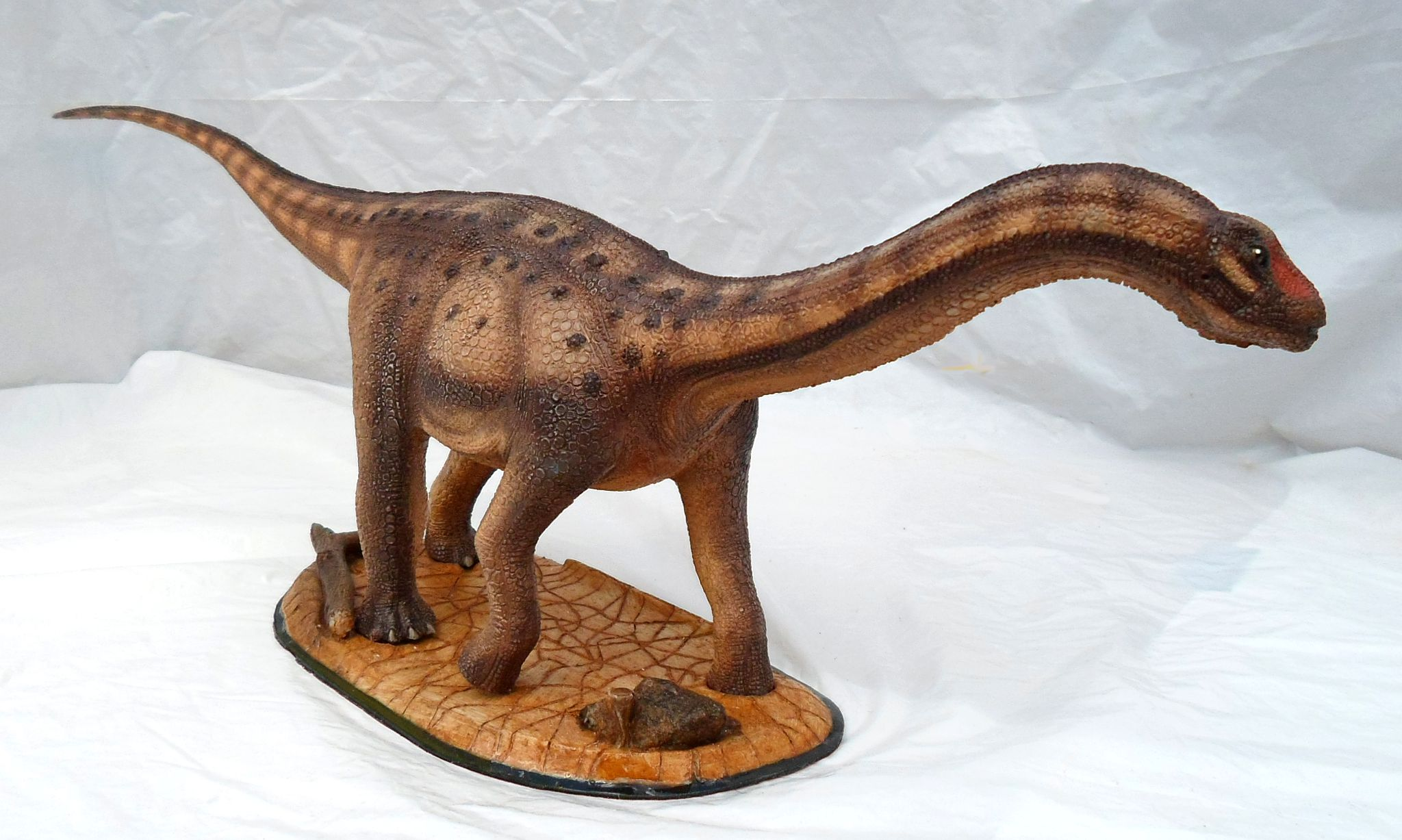
Sculpture of Adamantisaurus

Like many titanosaurians, Adamantisaurus is incompletely known, making its exact relationships difficult to establish. However, similarities have been noted with Aeolosaurus and the Bauru Group titanosaurian formerly known as the "Peiropolis titanosaur", now called Trigonosaurus.

== Description ==
As Adamantisaurus mezzalirai is only known from the anterior portion of the tail, relatively little is known about the anatomy of this species. It was probably a medium-sized titanosaur. In 2010 Gregory S. Paul estimated it to be roughly 13 meters (43 ft) long and 5 tonnes (5.5 short tons) in weight . However, in 2020 Molina-Pérez and Larramendi gave a larger estimation of 18 meters (60 ft) and 14.4 tonnes (15.8 short tons).

== Discovery and naming ==
Although this animal's remains were first mentioned in print in 1959, it was not named until the description written by Brazilian paleontologists Rodrigo Santucci and Reinaldo Bertini in 2006. It was the first dinosaur named in that year. The type specimen, the only material known of the genus, consists of the second through seventh caudal vertebrae and two chevrons.

Adamantisaurus is currently known only from the Adamantina Formation of Brazil. The Adamantina Formation is part of the Bauru Group of geologic formations. The stratigraphy and exact age of the Bauru Group is still unsettled, but the Adamantina probably occurs somewhere between the Turonian through early Maastrichtian stages of the Late Cretaceous Period (93 to 70 million years ago). Adamantisaurus shares the Adamantina with fellow titanosaurian, Gondwanatitan.

Adamantisaurus is named after the Adamantina Formation in the Brazilian state of São Paulo, where the fossil was found and also incorporates the Greek word sauros meaning 'lizard', the most common suffix used in dinosaur names. The type and only species, Adamantisaurus mezzalirai is named in honor of Sérgio Mezzalira, the Brazilian geologist who originally found the specimen and first mentioned it in print.

== Classification ==
The phylogenetic relationship of Adamantisaurus has yet to be rigorously tested. However, it appears to be more derived than Malawisaurus based on the ball-and-socket articulation of the caudal vertebrae. All titanosaurs at least as derived as Malawisaurus are members of the clade Lithostrotia. Within that clade, however, its relationships are unclear. Adamantisaurus resembles Aeolosaurus, a close relative of its contemporary Gondwanatitan, in some respects. Adamantisaurus cannot be directly compared to Brasilotitan, another genus found in the Adamantina Formation.
