= Fontecilla =

Family name

Fontecilla is a family name found in Spain, Italy, Chile, Mexico, Venezuela, The United States, and Canada.

== Origin ==
Fontecilla is one of a set of surnames related to or descended from 'Fuentes,' meaning fountains. These names include Fuente, de la Fuente, Fuentecilla, Fuéntez, Fuentez, Font, Fonte, Fontes, Fontecilla, Fontana, Fontano, Fontanal, Fontanales, Fontanals, Fontanella, Fontanet, Fontanillos and many more.

The name Fontecilla is a diminutive of fuente, a cognate of fountain.

It is a common surname in Chile and Italy (Torino).

In Santiago, Chile, there is a street named La Fontecilla.

== Notable persons named Fontecilla ==
- Mercedes Fontecilla (The 2nd first lady of Chile, 1811–1813).
- José Miguel Carrera Fontecilla (Chilean revolutionary, 1820–1860)
- Francisco Vargas Fontecilla (Chile's Minister of the Interior and Foreign Affairs, 1867–1868).
- Mariano Sánchez Fontecilla (Chile's Minister of Foreign Affairs, Cult and Colonization, 1889–1890 and 1894–1895).
- Aída Laso de Fontecilla (educator and 1932 Guggenheim Fellow).
- Ernesto Fontecilla (Chilean artist - 1930s).
- Eduardo Fontecilla (1956 Olympic competitor from Chile).
- Rafael Fontecilla Riquelme (President of Chile's Supreme Court, 1960–1963)
- Rodrigo Fontecilla (Chilean/Venezuelan Chess Master and Venezuelan National Chess Champion, 1979)
- Ezequiel Fontecilla (Chilean architect whose famous work includes Templo Parroquial)
- Andrés Fontecilla (Chilean banking business enterprising developer to college Banca Xpress, 2011–2013)
- Andrés Fontecilla (Canadian (Quebec) politician, born 1967)
