= Machichnus =

Trace fossil classification
- Ichnofamily: †Machichnidae
- Ichnogenus: †Machichnus; Mikuláš et al., 2006

Type ichnospecies
- Machichnus regularis Mikuláš et al., 2006

Ichnospecies
- M. regularis Mikuláš et al., 2006; M. bohemicus Mikuláš et al., 2006; M. multilineatus Mikuláš et al., 2006; M. normani Chumakov et al., 2013; M. harlandi Chumakov et al., 2013; M. jeansi Chumakov et al., 2013; M. fatimae de Araújo-Júnior et al., 2017

Trace fossil

Machichnus is an ichnogenus. It was erected by Mikuláš et al. (2006) for shallow, thin, discrete, parallel to subparallel, smooth-bottomed scratches, occurring on bone tissue in small groups or series. According to modern analogues, the series of scratches represent marks of teeth of carnivorous or scavenging reptilians and mammals. Such traces are quite frequent in the fossil record since the mid-Mesozoic, but they have seldom been described in detail.

The type species/specimen of Machichnus comes from the Miocene of the Czech Republic. In this case, crocodiles are suspect as tracemakers.

Machichnus originally contained three ichnospecies: Machichnus regularis, Machichnus multilineatus, and Machichnus bohemicus. The ichnogenera Brutalichnus and Nihilichnus were described in the same paper.

== See also ==
- Ichnology
