= Nygma =

Spots on the wings of certain insects

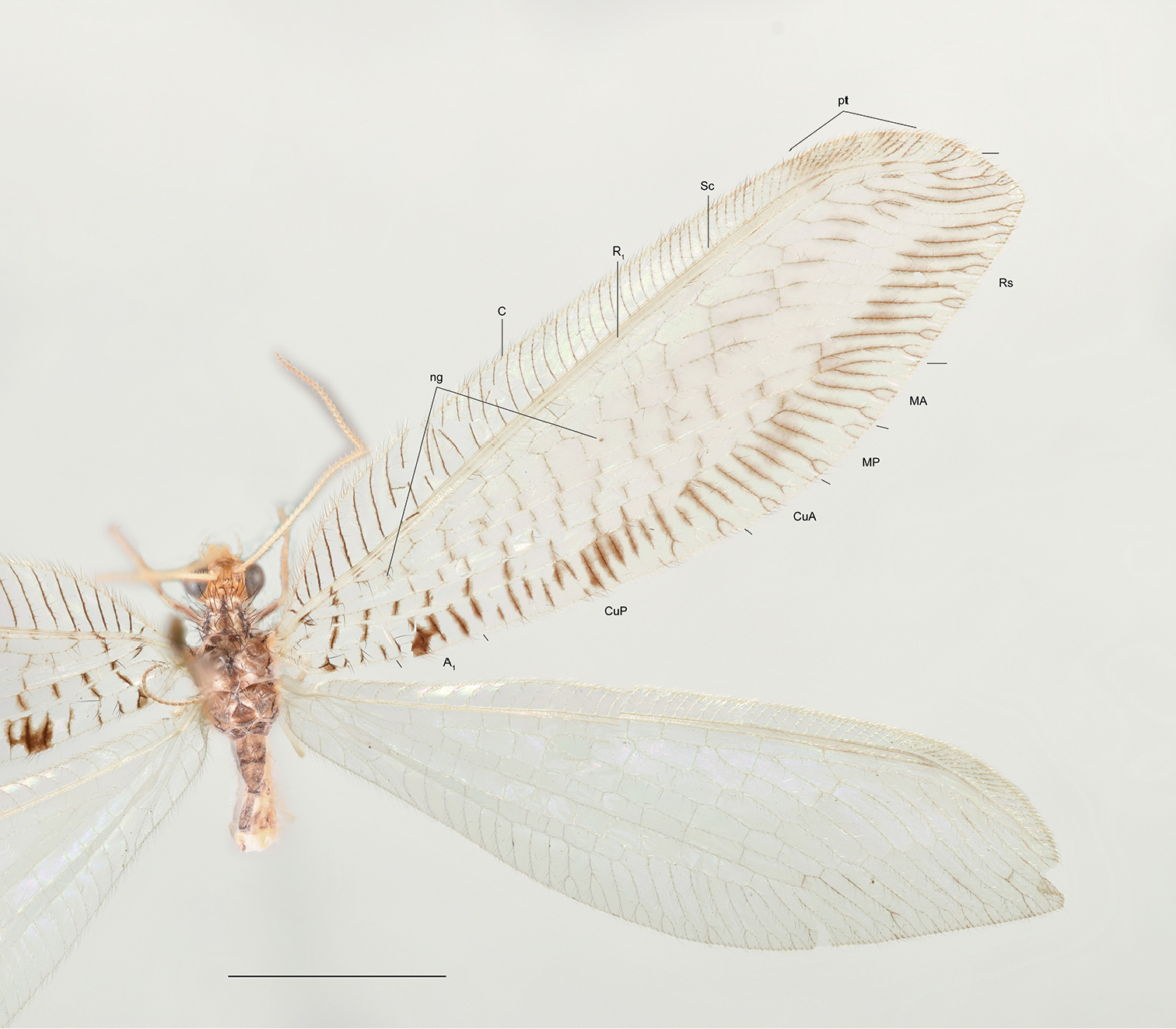
Thyridosmylus fuscomarginatus forewing nygmata marked with "ng"

A nygma (plural nygmata) is a spot on the wings of certain insects which have a peculiar dense cuticular structure. They are found only in the wings of endopterygotes but found only in some insect groups. Nygmata are found in caddisflies, scorpionflies, saw-flies and in some families of Neuroptera (e.g. Megaloptera and Ithonidae). The function of nygmata are unknown: they do not connect with nerves or glands. They are typically circular. They never occur on the veins and veins always appear to branch around them. Nygmata show up even in fossil Osmylidae from China. The positions and structure of nygmata are often used in the descriptions of insect species that bear them.
