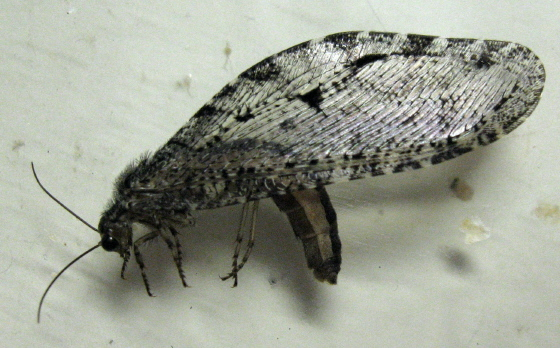

Scientific classification
- Kingdom: Animalia
- Phylum: Arthropoda
- Clade: Pancrustacea
- Class: Insecta
- Order: Neuroptera
- Family: Ithonidae
- Genus: Polystoechotes
- Species: P. punctata

Binomial name
- Polystoechotes punctata (Fabricius, 1793)

Synonyms
- Semblis punctata Fabricus, 1793; Hemerobius nebulosus Fabricus, 1798; Polystoechotes nebulosa (Fabricus, 1798); Hemerobius irroratus Say, 1824; Hemerobius vittatus Say, 1824; Polystoechotes vittata (Say, 1824); Polystoechotes strictica Burmeister, 1839; Osmylus validus Walker, 1853

= Polystoechotes punctata =

Species of lacewing

Polystoechotes punctata is a species of giant lacewing in the family Ithonidae. Found in Central America and North America, this giant lacewing was considered extirpated from eastern North America by the 1950s but was serendipitously rediscovered in Fayetteville, Arkansas, where it was found clinging to a facade at a Walmart in 2012. Although it was found in 2012, it was misidentified until 2020.

Characteristics

Winged insect, grow up to two inches.
