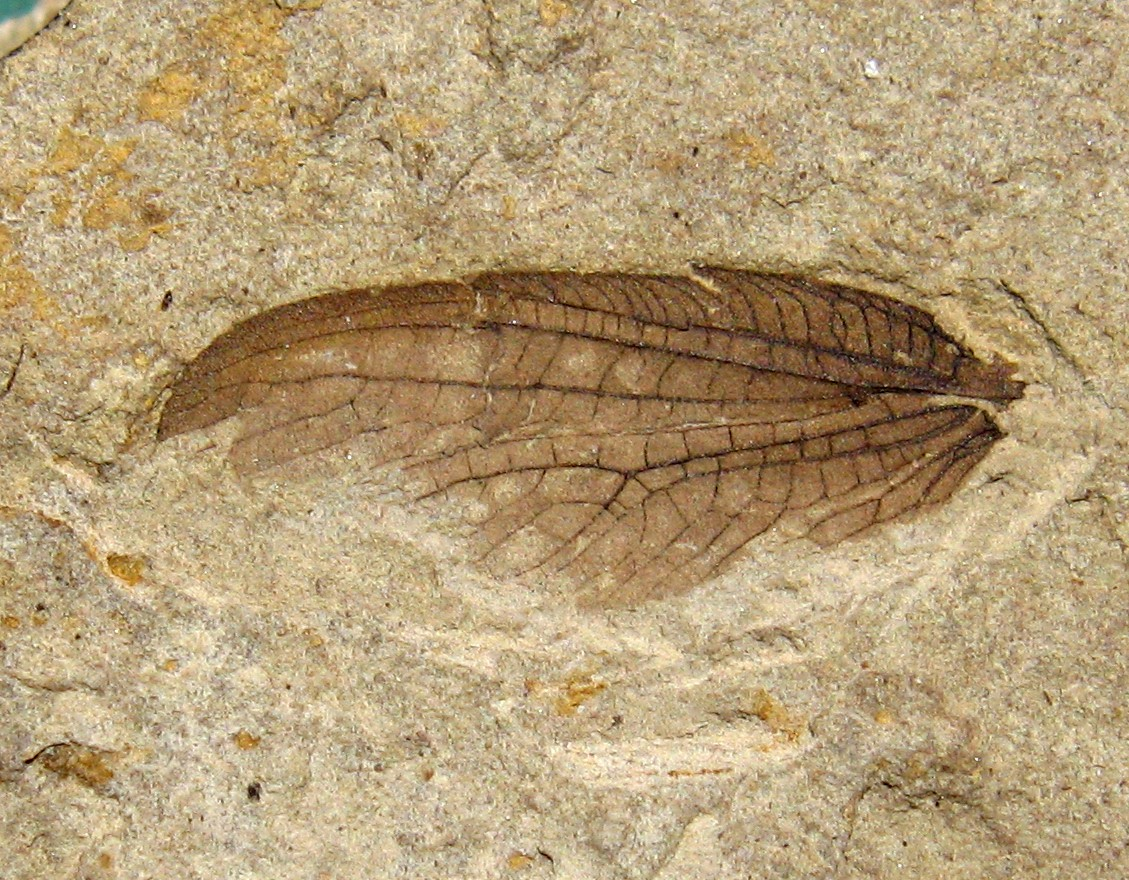
- Allorapisma chuorum holotype wing

Scientific classification
- Kingdom: Animalia
- Phylum: Arthropoda
- Clade: Pancrustacea
- Class: Insecta
- Order: Neuroptera
- Family: Ithonidae
- Genus: †Allorapisma; Makarkin & Archibald, 2009
- Species: †A. chuorum

Binomial name
- †Allorapisma chuorum Makarkin & Archibald, 2009

= Allorapisma =

Allorapisma Temporal range: Ypresian

Extinct genus of lacewings

Allorapisma is an extinct genus of lacewing in the moth lacewings family Ithonidae. The genus is solely known from two Eocene fossils found in North America. At the time of description the genus was composed of a single species, Allorapisma chuorum.

== History and classification ==
Allorapisma chuorum is known only from two fossils, the part side of the holotype left fore-wing, specimen number SR 08–14–01, and the part side of a paratype right fore-wing, specimen number SRUI 08–04–01. Both the fossil are currently housed in the collections of the Stonerose Interpretive Center Republic, Washington, US. The specimens are preserved as compression fossils in silty yellow to grayish shale, which were recovered from outcrops of the Tom Thumb Tuff member of the Klondike Mountain Formation. The formation is approximately Early Eocene, Ypresian in age, being radiometrically dated as 49.4 million years old.

Allorapisma was first studied by the paleoentomologists Vladimir N. Makarkin of the Far Eastern Branch of the Russian Academy of Sciences and S. Bruce Archibald from Simon Fraser University in Burnaby, British Columbia. Their 2009 type description of the new genus and species was published in the online journal Zootaxa. The genus name Allorapisma was coined by the researchers as a combination of the moth lacewing type genus Rapisma and the Greek word Allo meaning "other", which is in reference to the similarity of the new genus to Rapisma. The specific epithet chuorum is honor of the Chu family from Kirkland, Washington who found the holotype and donated it to the Stonerose Interpretive Center.

Overall the vein structure of Allorapisma is most similar to the genus Principiala, known from Cretaceous fossils found in both Brazil and England. Following the Comstock–Needham system, the wings of both genera show the apical end of the Rs vein fused to the MA vein. Both have similar positioning and shaping of the MP vein and the CuA vein running parallel to the MP vein. As such, Makarkin and Archibald suggested the two be grouped in an informal suprageneric group called the Principiala group. This group is one of three possibly monophyletic groups in Ithonidae, the others two being the Ithone group and the Rapisma group. Before the merging of the families Ithonidae and Polystoechotidae in 2010, Allorapisma was the first Ithonidae fossil to be described from the Cenozoic.

== Description ==
The holotype and paratype consist of partially complete forewings, each missing sections of the lower wing margin. The preserved section of the holotype fore-wing is approximately 16 mm (0.63 in) long and 6.2–6.3 mm (0.24–0.25 in) wide. The paratype is slightly longer at 16.5 mm (0.65 in) and 6.3 mm (0.25 in) wide. The wings have a costal space that is wide, widening towards the wing base and narrowing towards the wing tip. The space between the R1 and Rs veins is notably larger than the subcostal space, while the costal space has several crossveins near the edge of the costal margin. The MA and MP veins are distinct in origins from each other, with the MA starting at the R vein, a character that is rare in Neuroptera.
