= Daohugouthallus =

Daohugouthallus Temporal range: Middle Jurassic 168-152 Ma
- Daohugouthallus ciliiferus fossil

Scientific classification
- Kingdom: Fungi
- Division: Ascomycota
- Class: Lecanoromycetes
- Family: †Daohugouthallaceae; X.L.Wei, D.Ren & J.C.Wei (2022)
- Genus: †Daohugouthallus; Wang, Krings & Taylor (2010)
- Species: †D. ciliiferus

Binomial name
- †Daohugouthallus ciliiferus Wang, Krings & Taylor (2010)

Fossil lichen

Daohugouthallus is a monotypic genus of lichen, known from fossils found in the Jurassic Haifanggou Formation near Daohugou village, Ningcheng County, China. The genus contains a single species, D. ciliiferus. Although Daohugouthallus shows some relationships to the family Parmeliaceae, it is distinct enough for scientists to suggest its classification into its own family, Daohugouthallaceae. Dated at approximately 165 million years ago, this macrolichen is thought to be the earliest fossil example of an epiphytic macrolichen, indicating it likely grew on gymnosperm plants.

== Discovery ==
Five specimens of Daohugouthallus ciliiferus have been found so far. These were collected from the fossiliferous beds of the Jurassic Haifanggou Formation in China (Callovian–Oxfordian boundary interval, Middle Jurassic), a formation which has been dated at between 168 and 152 Ma based on isotopic analyses. More specifically, the site of discovery can be found about 80 km to the south of Chifeng City, within the Inner Mongolia Autonomous Region (lat.119°14.318′E, long. 41°18.979′N).

On first discovery, it was thought that the D. ciliiferus was a "lichen-like" organism. It was considered to be affiliated with either thallose liverworts, alga, or lichens. Due to a lack of diagnostic features which would ally the species with liverworts or alga, D. ciliiferus was determined to be most closely affiliated with lichens. This is based primarily on the fossil thalli and ruptured branch tips, making this species the earliest known example of a macrolichen with morphology comparable to that of extant lichen species. The species has been listed under the 2022 in paleontology events overview and as a floristic component of the Daohugou flora.

D. ciliiferus fossil specimens are currently kept in Beijing, at the Key Lab of Insect Evolution and Environmental Changes within the College of Life Sciences and Academy for Multidisciplinary Studies at Capital Normal University.

=== Preservation ===
Daohugouthallus ciliiferus specimens are preserved as lichen adpression fossils left on a yellowish tuffaceous mudstone matrix. In total, five specimens containing D. ciliiferus lichen have been recorded, with some fossils also containing remains of an unidentified gymnosperm with associated seed cones.

=== Etymology ===
Daohugouthallus ciliiferus fossil specimens were found near Daohugou village in Ningcheng County. The village lends its name to the first part of the genus "Daohugou" while the second part "thallus" is a Latin term which refers to a plant-like body without typical differentiation into parts such as roots, stems and leaves. "Ciliiferus" comes from the Latin for bearing cilia, referring to the presence of cilia present in this macrolichen.

== Description ==
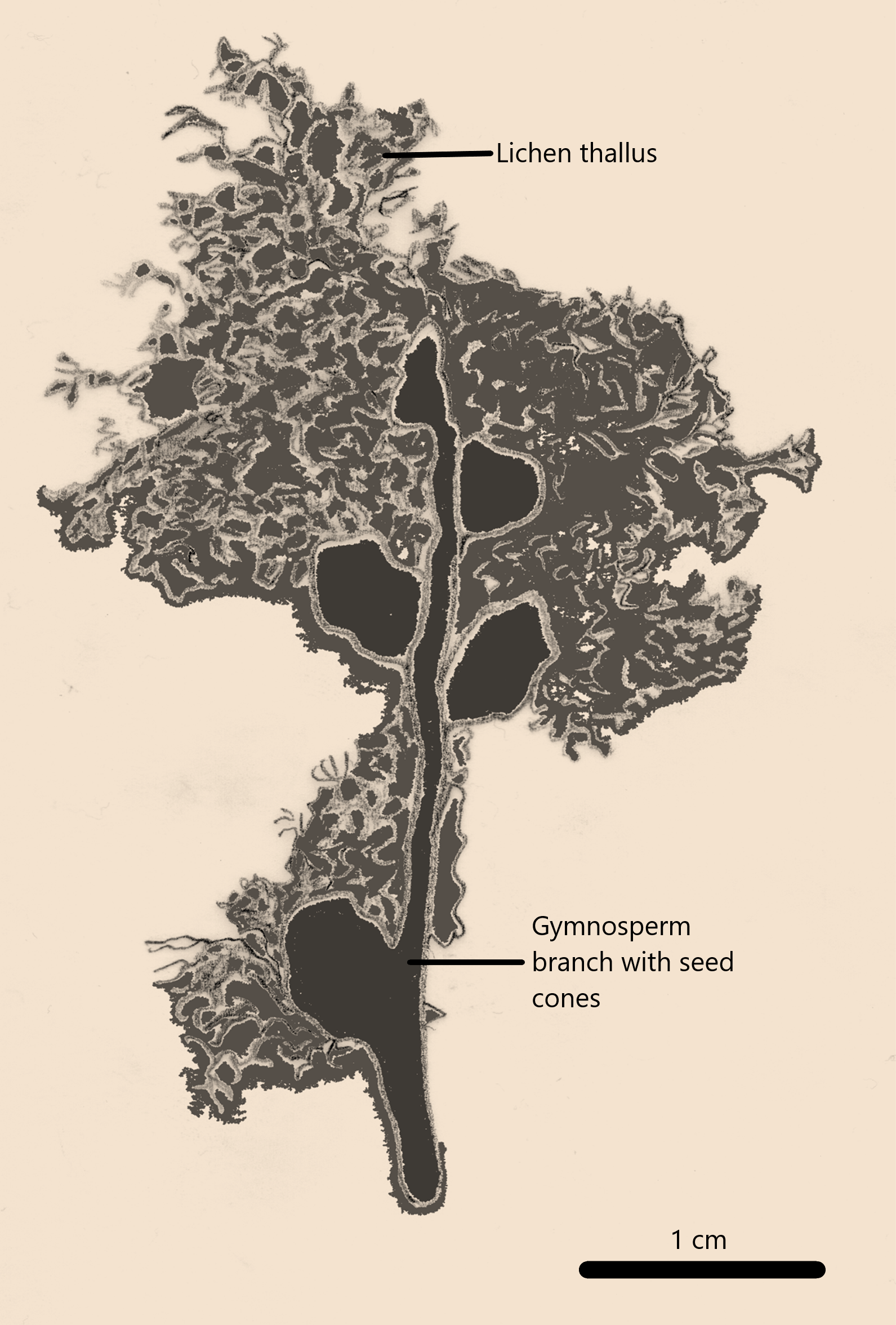
Simplified sketch diagram of one fossil of Daohugouthallus ciliiferus attached to gymnosperm branch containing seed cones. Scale bar: 1 cm (Based on Figure 4; Yang et al., 2023)

The thalli of Daohugouthallus ciliiferus are approximately 5 cm high and 3 cm wide and foliose to subfruticose. The slender lobes have tapering tips and are approximately 5 mm long and between 0.5 and 1.5 mm wide. Their branching pattern is irregular, and in some places lateral cilia and lobules are present. Aggregated, punctiform black spots are regularly visible on the surface of the lichen remnants, and the upper cortex is approximately 1 μm thick and described as conglutinate, i.e. stuck together.

The photobiont component of the D. ciliiferus specimens is comparable to extant green algae species. These cells are globose with a diameter of between 1.5 and 2.5 μm. The mycobiont-photobiont attachment is via wall-to-wall interface, allowing nutrient exchange between the fungal and algal components. The fungal hyphae of the mycobiont component are filamentous and septate with a diameter of less than 1.25 μm. Both the photobiont cells and fungal hyphae are narrower than those of extant macrolichen species which could be due to drying during the fossilisation process which caused shrinkage. Alternatively, the photobiont algae species could have been naturally smaller in size in this lichen species. No alternative explanation has been proposed as to why the fungal hyphae are smaller than those in comparable extant macrolichens.

With an estimated age of around 165 Ma, Daohugouthallaceae could be the oldest known macrolichen family aside from Icmadophilaceae. It has been confirmed that D. ciliiferus was an gymnosperm epiphyte due to the more recent specimens being found attached to an unidentified gymnosperm branch. However, the key identification features for determining the way in which the macrolichen attached itself to the branch or bark, such as rhizines, tomentum, or an umbilicus, are missing.

=== Classification ===
When compared to extant lichen genera, it has been found that the thallus morphology is most similar to foliose Parmeliaceae. However, the resemblance is not morphologically close enough to include D. ciliiferus in the Parmeliaceae family. For this reason, a monogeneric family has been proposed for this fossil – Daohugouthallaceae –with the unique genus Daohugouthallus. The consensus is that D. ciliiferus could be described within the class Lecanoromycetes but the Phylum is currently Fungi incertae sedis, i.e. uncertain placement. The external morphology could be closely correlated to the extant lichen species Everniastrum cirrhatum. However, several key diagnostic features which would allow for a more accurate classification are missing including hamathecia, asci, and ascospore structures.

== Palaeoenvironment ==
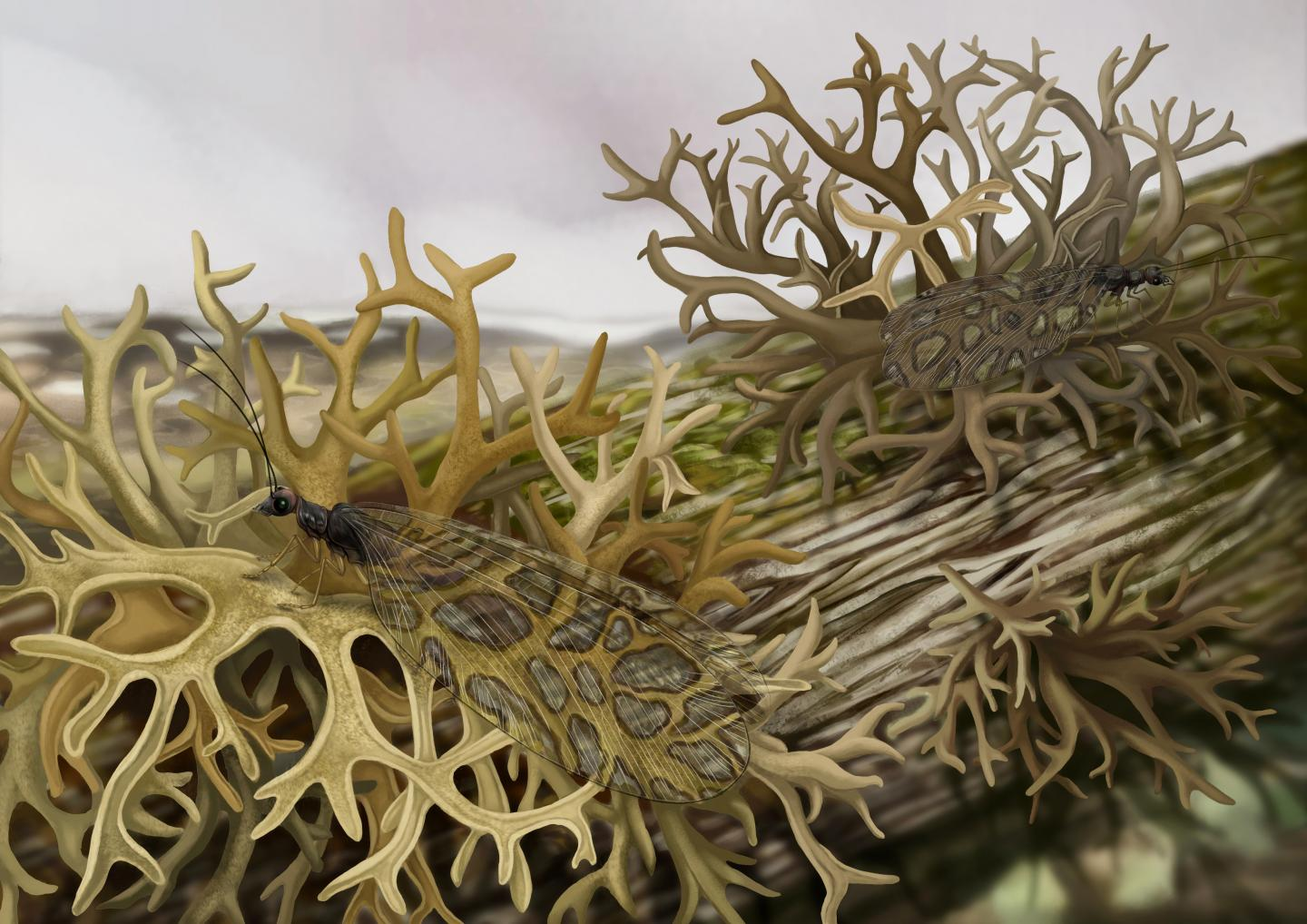
Hypothesized mimetic relationship between Daohugouthallus ciliiferus and the moth lacewing genus Lichenipolystoechotes.

The Middle Jurassic palaeoenvironment of the Daohuguo area has been reconstructed as temperate, humid and seasonal, with variations in precipitation. The area was composed of gymnosperm-dominated forests interspersed with lakes and freshwater streams. This environment may have been affected by large volcanic eruptions which spread thick layers of ash across the landscape.

=== Palaeoecology ===
The climate and conditions prior to the discovery of D. ciliiferus may support its epiphytic habit. Lecanoromycetes are estimated to have diverged between 300 and 250 Mya following the end-Permian mass extinction. This period is partially characterised by diverse gymnosperm forests which may have provided the ideal environment for the adaptation of epiphytic macrolichens. Forest ecosystems similar to these recovered again following the end-Triassic mass extinction (200 Mya). This makes it possible for the existence of gymnosperm epiphytic lichens during the middle-Jurassic from which D. ciliiferus is dated. However, there is no empiric fossil evidence to support this evolutionary path nor the potential transition of epiphytic lichens from gymnosperm to angiosperm substrates.

=== Insect-lichen mimesis ===
Lichenipolystoechotes angustimaculatus forewing fossil showing color-pattern

The moth lacewing genus Lichenipolystoechotes, has been suggested to have been associated with D. ciliiferus. The lacewings are described as having a phytomimesis relationships with the lichen in life. Both Lichenipolystoechotes species were described from fossils found at Daohugou 1 near Daohugou Village in China where the Jurassic Jiulongshan Formation outcrops and close to the site in which D. ciliiferus fossils were found. The genus name was coined as a reference to the possible association with D. ciliiferus lichen.

Structural similarities between the branching light and dark patterning on the lacewing forewings and the branching morphology of D. ciliiferus was described as an example of insect-lichen mimesis. Additionally, the black spots present on the L. ramimaculatus resemble the black spots found on D. ciliiferus specimens. It has been hypothesised that these moth lacewings could have camouflaged themselves effectively against a backdrop of D. ciliiferus lichen, providing a survival advantage.
