= Varnia =

Scientific classification
- Domain: Eukaryota
- Kingdom: Animalia
- Phylum: Arthropoda
- Class: Insecta
- Order: Neuroptera
- Family: Ithonidae
- Genus: Varnia; Walker, 1860

Species
- Varnia implexa; Varnia perloides

Genus of lacewings

Varnia is a small genus of moth lacewings, in the family Ithonidae. The genus is restricted to Australia, with only two species.
