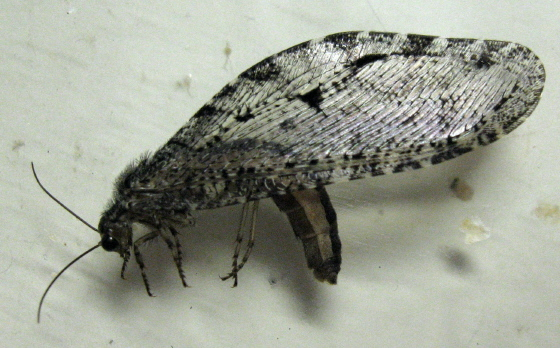
- Polystoechotes punctata

Scientific classification
- Kingdom: Animalia
- Phylum: Arthropoda
- Class: Insecta
- Order: Neuroptera
- Family: Ithonidae
- Genus: Polystoechotes; Burmeister, 1839

= Polystoechotes =

Genus of lacewings

Polystoechotes is a genus of giant lacewings in the family Ithonidae. There are at least two described species in Polystoechotes, which are native to North America. The name is derived from the Greek πολύς (polys) meaning "much" and στοιχάς (stoichas) meaning "in rows behind another".

== Species ==
These two species belong to the genus Polystoechotes:

- Polystoechotes gazullai Navás, 1924, Chile
- Polystoechotes punctata (Fabricius, 1793), North America
