= Principiala =

Principiala Temporal range: Barremian - Late Aptian

Scientific classification
- Domain: Eukaryota
- Kingdom: Animalia
- Phylum: Arthropoda
- Class: Insecta
- Order: Neuroptera
- Family: Ithonidae
- Genus: †Principiala; Makarkin & Menon, 2007

Species
- P. incerta; P. rudgwickensis

Extinct genus of insects

Principiala is an extinct genus of lacewing in the moth lacewings family Ithonidae. The genus is known from Cretaceous fossils found in South America, Europe, and possibly Asia. The genus is composed of two species, the type species Principiala incerta, and Principiala rudgwickensis.

== History and classification ==
Principiala is known only from three fossils assigned to the two species and an additional fossil tentatively assigned to the genus. The holotype adult of P. incerta, specimen number SMNK PAL 5352 is housed in the collections of the State Museum of Natural History Stuttgart, while the partial paratype adult, specimen number SMNS 66000/255, is part of the State Museum of Natural History Karlsruhe, Germany. The specimens are preserved as compression fossils in finely laminated siltstones, which were recovered from outcrops of the Nova Olinda Member of the Late Aptian Crato Formation in Northeastern Brazil. P. rudgwickensis was described from a single part and counterpart holotype, "BMB 025005, -6" that is part of the Booth Museum of Natural History in Brighton and Hove, England. The species is older than P. incerta, having been recovered from Rudgwick Brickworks which mined sediments of the Barremian Upper Weald Clay Formation. A single wing has been recovered from the Yixian Formation in China which was noted as probably belonging to the genus by Makarkin et al in 2012.

The Brazilian fossils were first studied by the paleoentomologists Vladimir N. Makarkin of the Far Eastern Branch of the Russian Academy of Sciences and Federica Menon from the University of Manchester in England. Their 2007 type description of the new genus and species was published in the journal Cretaceous Research. The genus name Principiala was coined by the researchers as a combination of "Principi", in honor of Italian entomologist Maria Principi and the Latin word ala meaning "wing". The specific epithet "incerta" is derived from the Latin incertus, in reference to the uncertain relationship of the genus within Ithonidae.

Two years later a group of researchers led by paleoentomologist James Jepson described the second species P. rudgwickensis. The team chose the species name "rudgwickensis" as a reference to the Rudgwick Brickworks where the fossil was found.

Overall the vein structure of Principiala is most similar to the genus Allorapisma, known from Ypresian fossils found in the northwestern United States. The wings of both genera show the apical end of the Rs vein fused to the MA vein. Both have similar positioning and shaping of the MP vein and the CuA vein running parallel to the MP vein. As such, Makarkin and Archibald suggested the two be grouped in an informal suprageneric group called the Principiala group. This group is one of three possibly monophyletic groups in Ithonidae, the others two being the Ithone group and the Rapisma group.

== Description ==
The genus is identified by the short length of the antennae. Being approximately 2–2.5 mm (0.079–0.098 in) long, they are the shortest of the described neuropterans, with Rapisma having the shortest of the extant genera. The costal region of the fore-wing shows a regular series of cross-veins which gives the appearance of a longitudinal vein in the base area of the region. In contrast to the cross-veins of the costal area, the cross-veins in the subcostal area of the fore-wing are there are irregularly spaced and uneven. The area between the radius and median veins is notably narrow near the fore-wing base, and narrows towards the wing tip until the two veins merge. As with many Ithonidea genera, the head is pulled most of the way under the pronotal shield. P. incerta and P. rudgwickensis are distinguished by the characters of the species fore-wings, with an approximate length of 19 mm (0.75 in) for the former and only an estimated 11–12 mm (0.43–0.47 in) in the latter. In addition the last branch of the Rs vein in P. rudgwickensis is distinctly longer than that seen in P. incerta before the branches merge with the Median vein. P. rudgwickensis also shows a number of crossveins between the Rs branches of the Radial vein and the tip sections of the Rs branches are straight, both features absent or not preserved in P. incerta.
