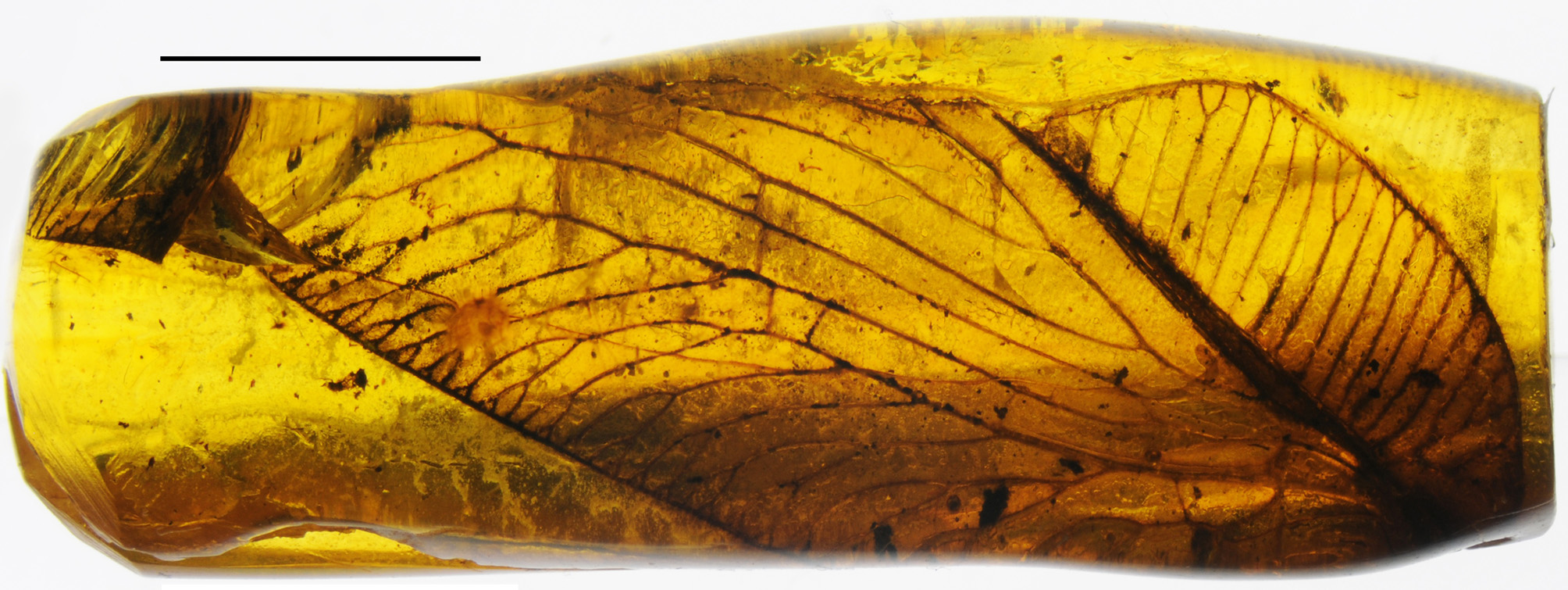
- Holotype forewing, Baltic amber

Scientific classification
- Kingdom: Animalia
- Phylum: Arthropoda
- Class: Insecta
- Order: Neuroptera
- Family: Ithonidae
- Genus: †Elektrithone; Makarkin, Wedmann, & Weiterschan, 2014
- Species: †E. expectata

Binomial name
- †Elektrithone expectata Makarkin, Wedmann, & Weiterschan, 2014

= Elektrithone =

Elektrithone Temporal range: Lutetian

Extinct genus of insects

Elektrithone is an extinct genus of lacewing in the moth lacewings family Ithonidae. The genus is solely known from an Eocene fossil forewing found in Europe. At the times of description the genus was composed of a single species, Elektrithone expectata.

== History and classification ==
Elektrithone expectata is known only from the one fossil, the holotype, specimen number SMF Be 2374, which is housed in the collections of the Senckenberg Forschungsinstitut und Naturmuseum in Frankfurt, Germany. The specimen is preserved as an inclusion in a transparent chunk of 46 million year old Baltic amber which was deposited during the Lutetian stage of the Middle Eocene. There is debate on what plant family produced the amber, with evidence supporting relatives of either an Agathis relative or a Pseudolarix relative. The fossil was first studied by the paleoentomologists Vladimir N. Makarkin of the Far Eastern Branch of the Russian Academy of Sciences, Sonja Wedmann of the Senckenberg Forschungsstation, and Thomas Weiterschan of Höchst im Odenwald, Germany. Their 2014 type description of the new genus and species was published in the online journal Zootaxa. The genus name Elektrithone was coined by the researchers as a combination of the moth lacewing genus Ithone and the Greek word elektro meaning "amber", which is in reference to the finding of the genus in Baltic amber. The specific epithet expectata is from the Latin word meaning "expected", alluding to the anticipated find of the family in Baltic amber. Elektrithone is the first member of Ithonidae to be discovered in Baltic amber.

Using the Comstock–Needham system for describing insect venation patterns, the Elektrithone CuP (cubitus posterior, the "rear elbow") venation is similar to members of the neuropteran families Brongniartiellidae and Osmylopsychopidae, in that the CuP in both families is short and not comb like. However, both families have wings with an anal area that has at least one or two highly branched anal veins, a character that is not seen in Elektrithone. The broad costal area of Elektrithone along with the strongly curved humeral veinlet, comb like MP (medial posterior) and CuA (cubitus anterior) veins and the series structure of the radial crossveins are all features seen in Ithonidae. The features found in Elektrithone are a mosaic of characters found in several genera of Ithonids.

== Description ==
The holotype is composed of a single partially complete forewing which is missing a section of the central wing area. The preserved section of the forewing is approximately 19 mm (0.75 in) long and 10 mm (0.39 in) wide, with an estimated length, if whole, of 30 mm (1.2 in). The wing has a costal space that is wide, widening towards the wing base and a number of trichosors are present along the leading edge of the wing. The ScA (subcostal anterior) veinlet is well developed, thick, and connecting to the ScP (subcostal posterior) vein before the humeral veinlet. The subcostal veinlets mostly are only shallowly forked, and the radial crossveins being grouped into a pair of gradate series. The wing does not show any evidence that nygma were present in life.
