= Oliarces =

Scientific classification
- Domain: Eukaryota
- Kingdom: Animalia
- Phylum: Arthropoda
- Class: Insecta
- Order: Neuroptera
- Family: Ithonidae
- Genus: Oliarces; Banks, 1908
- Species: O. clara

Binomial name
- Oliarces clara Banks, 1908

Genus of lacewings

Oliarces is a genus of moth lacewings in the family Ithonidae, containing a single described species, O. clara.
