= Ningcheng County =

Ningcheng County 宁城县 • ᠨᠢᠩᠴᠧᠩ ᠰᠢᠶᠠᠨ
- County
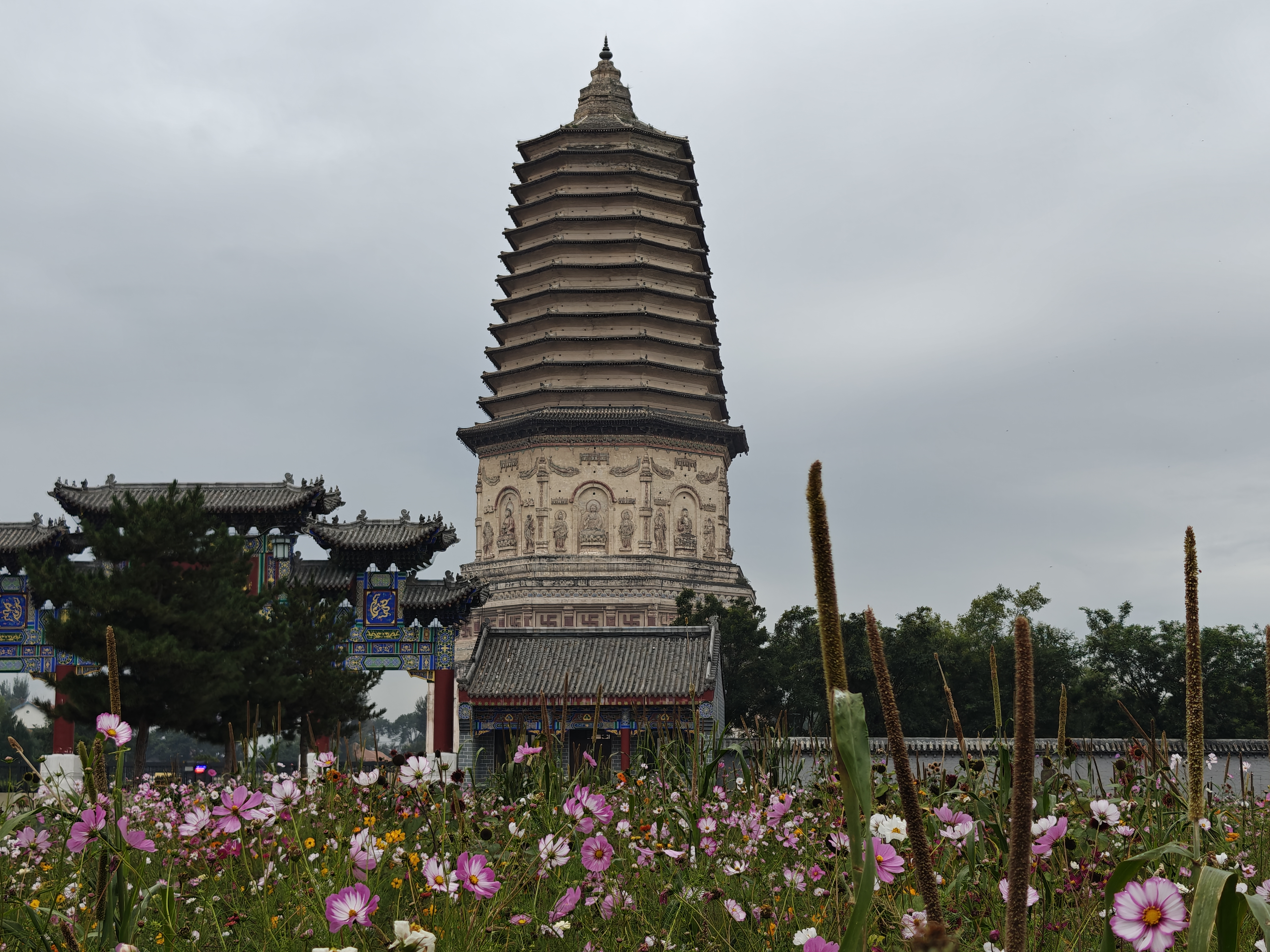
- The Liao Dynasty Daming Pagoda

- Location in Inner Mongolia Ningcheng (China)
- Coordinates: 41°35′N 119°21′E
- Country: China
- Autonomous region: Inner Mongolia
- Prefecture-level city: Chifeng
- County seat: Tianyi

Area
  - Total: 4,326 km^{2} (1,670 sq mi)
- Elevation: 551 m (1,808 ft)

Population (2020)
  - Total: 484,397
  - Density: 112.0/km^{2} (290.0/sq mi)
- Time zone: UTC+8 (China Standard)
- Website: www.ningchengxian.gov.cn

Ningcheng County

Chinese name
- Simplified Chinese: 宁城县
- Traditional Chinese: 寧城縣
Transcriptions
Standard Mandarin
- Hanyu Pinyin: Níngchéng Xiàn

Mongolian name
- Mongolian Cyrillic: Нинчэн шиан
- Mongolian script: ᠨᠢᠩᠴᠧᠩ ᠰᠢᠶᠠᠨ
Transcriptions
- SASM/GNC: Niŋčėŋ siyan

Ningcheng County (Mongolian: ᠨᠢᠩᠴᠧᠩ ᠰᠢᠶᠠᠨ; Chinese: 宁城县) is a county of southeastern Inner Mongolia, China, bordering Liaoning province to the east. It is under the administration of Chifeng City.

The daohugouthallus extinct genus of lichen was found near Daohugou village in Ningcheng County. The county contains the historical site of "Liao Middle Capital" Dading Fu, one of five capitals of Liao. The city was later conquered by the 12th-century Jurchen Jin dynasty, who also named it as their Middle Capital; later they renamed it as the Northern Capital after moving the court to present-day Beijing.

Today, all that remains of the historical capital are two pagodas, one built by the Liao dynasty and one built by the Jin dynasty; they are located near Daming Town, about 20 km west of the county government Tianyi Town, and about 120 km south of the prefectural city Chifeng.

== Transport ==
The county is served by two railway stations. Ningcheng Station, opened in 2020, is a station of the Chifeng–Kazuo high-speed railway, and provides high-speed rail services to Chifeng, Shenyang, and Beijing. The older Tianyi Railway Station was built in 1935, and is a station of the Yechi Railway that runs between Jianping County and Chifeng. While it primary serves as a cargo station today, there remains a once-daily passenger service from the station.

== Administrative divisions ==
Ningcheng County is made up of 3 subdistricts, 13 towns and 2 townships.

Name	Simplified Chinese	Hanyu Pinyin	Mongolian (Hudum Script)	Mongolian (Cyrillic)	Administrative division code
Subdistricts
Tiexi Subdistrict	铁西街道	Tiěxī Jiēdào	ᠲᠡᠮᠦᠷ ᠵᠠᠮ ᠤᠨ ᠪᠠᠷᠠᠭᠤᠨᠳ᠋ᠠᠬᠢ ᠵᠡᠭᠡᠯᠢ ᠭᠤᠳᠤᠮᠵᠢ	Дамар замын баруунтах зээл гудамж	150429407
Tiedong Subdistrict	铁东街道	Tiědōng Jiēdào	ᠲᠡᠮᠦᠷ ᠵᠠᠮ ᠤᠨ ᠵᠡᠭᠦᠨᠳ᠋ᠠᠬᠢ ᠵᠡᠭᠡᠯᠢ ᠭᠤᠳᠤᠮᠵᠢ	Дамар замын зүүндэх зээл гудамж	150429408
Wenquan Subdistrict	温泉街道	Wēnquán Jiēdào	ᠷᠠᠰᠢᠶᠠᠨ ᠵᠡᠭᠡᠯᠢ ᠭᠤᠳᠤᠮᠵᠢ	Рашаан зээл гудамж	150429409
Towns
Tianyi Town	天义镇	Tiānyì Zhèn	ᠲᠢᠶᠠᠨ ᠢ ᠪᠠᠯᠭᠠᠰᠤ	Даяан И балгас	150429100
Xiaochengzi Town	小城子镇	Xiǎochéngzi Zhèn	ᠰᠢᠶᠣᠤ ᠴᠧᠩᠽᠢ ᠪᠠᠯᠭᠠᠰᠤ	Шяо цэнз балгас	150429101
Dachengzi Town	大城子镇	Dàchéngzi Zhèn	ᠮᠠᠷᠠᠲᠤ ᠪᠠᠯᠭᠠᠰᠤ (ᠳᠡᠭᠡᠷ᠎ᠡ ᠬᠣᠷᠣᠭ᠎ᠠ ᠪᠠᠯᠭᠠᠰᠤ)	Мард балгас (Дээр хороо балгас)	150429102
Burhan Town	八里罕镇	Bālǐhǎn Zhèn	ᠪᠠᠷᠬᠠᠨ ᠪᠠᠯᠭᠠᠰᠤ	Бархан балгас	150429103
Heilihe Town	黑里河镇	Hēilǐhé Zhèn	ᠬᠣᠷᠣᠬ᠎ᠠ ᠪᠠᠯᠭᠠᠰᠤ	Хорх балгас	150429104
Youbeiping Town	右北平镇	Yòuběipíng Zhèn	ᠬᠠᠷᠠᠬᠣᠲᠠ ᠪᠠᠯᠭᠠᠰᠤ	Хархот балгас	150429105
Dashuangmiao Town	大双庙镇	Dàshuāngmiào Zhèn	ᠳ᠋ᠠ ᠱᠤᠸᠠᠩ ᠮᠢᠶᠣᠤ ᠪᠠᠯᠭᠠᠰᠤ	Да сойн мяо балгас	150429106
Xizi Town	汐子镇	Xīzǐ Zhèn	ᠰᠢᠽᠢ ᠪᠠᠯᠭᠠᠰᠤ	Шизи балгас	150429107
Daming Town	大明镇	Dàmíng Zhèn	ᠳ᠋ᠠᠮᠢᠩ ᠪᠠᠯᠭᠠᠰᠤ	Тамин балгас	150429108
Mangnud Town	忙农镇	Mángnóng Zhèn	ᠮᠠᠩᠨᠢᠭᠤᠳ ᠪᠠᠯᠭᠠᠰᠤ	Мэнниуд балгас	150429109
Wuhua Town	五化镇	Wǔhuà Zhèn	ᠤᠭᠤᠷ ᠪᠠᠯᠭᠠᠰᠤ	Огооро балгас	150429110
Sanzuodian Town	三座店镇	Sānzuòdiàn Zhèn	ᠰᠠᠨ ᠽᠦᠸᠧ ᠳ᠋ᠢᠶᠠᠨ ᠪᠠᠯᠭᠠᠰᠤ	Сан жуве даяан балгас	150429110
Bayashulang Town	必斯营子镇	Bìsīyíngzi Zhèn	ᠪᠠᠶᠠᠰᠬᠤᠯᠠᠩ ᠪᠠᠯᠭᠠᠰᠤ	Баясгалан балгас	150429112
Townships
Ih Jung Township	一肯中乡	Yīkěnzhōng Xiāng	ᠶᠡᠬᠡ ᠵᠦᠩ ᠰᠢᠶᠠᠩ	Их жүн шиян	150429202
Cunjingou Township	存金沟乡	Cúnjīngōu Xiāng	ᠰᠣᠩᠭᠢᠨ᠎ᠠ ᠰᠢᠶᠠᠩ	Сонгино шиян	150429203

Others:

- Zhongjing Industrial Park (中京工业园)
- Saifeiya Food Industrial Park (塞飞亚食品工业园)
- Burhan Alcohol Industrial Park (八里罕酒业园区)
- Renewable Resources Industrial Park (再生资源产业园)
- Biotechnology Industrial Park (生物科技产业园区)
- Xizi Industrial Park (汐子工业园)
- Agricultural Machinery Industrial Park (农机产业园区)

== Climate ==
Climate data for Ningcheng, elevation 544 m (1,785 ft), (1991–2020 normals, extremes 1981–present)
Month	Jan	Feb	Mar	Apr	May	Jun	Jul	Aug	Sep	Oct	Nov	Dec	Year
Record high °C (°F)	11.9 (53.4)	20.0 (68.0)	26.0 (78.8)	31.9 (89.4)	38.0 (100.4)	37.7 (99.9)	42.8 (109.0)	37.2 (99.0)	33.7 (92.7)	29.0 (84.2)	22.5 (72.5)	16.1 (61.0)	42.8 (109.0)
Mean daily maximum °C (°F)	−2.7 (27.1)	1.7 (35.1)	8.7 (47.7)	17.3 (63.1)	24.1 (75.4)	27.7 (81.9)	29.3 (84.7)	28.1 (82.6)	23.8 (74.8)	16.2 (61.2)	5.9 (42.6)	−1.2 (29.8)	14.9 (58.8)
Daily mean °C (°F)	−11.2 (11.8)	−6.7 (19.9)	1.1 (34.0)	10.0 (50.0)	17.2 (63.0)	21.3 (70.3)	23.5 (74.3)	21.8 (71.2)	16.1 (61.0)	8.3 (46.9)	−1.5 (29.3)	−9.0 (15.8)	7.6 (45.6)
Mean daily minimum °C (°F)	−18.0 (−0.4)	−13.7 (7.3)	−6.0 (21.2)	2.8 (37.0)	10.0 (50.0)	15.2 (59.4)	18.2 (64.8)	16.2 (61.2)	9.2 (48.6)	1.6 (34.9)	−7.5 (18.5)	−15.3 (4.5)	1.1 (33.9)
Record low °C (°F)	−32.7 (−26.9)	−28.7 (−19.7)	−21.1 (−6.0)	−9.4 (15.1)	−2.1 (28.2)	4.8 (40.6)	10.7 (51.3)	5.4 (41.7)	−2.0 (28.4)	−10.9 (12.4)	−25.0 (−13.0)	−31.2 (−24.2)	−32.7 (−26.9)
Average precipitation mm (inches)	1.1 (0.04)	1.8 (0.07)	6.3 (0.25)	22.6 (0.89)	45.7 (1.80)	80.8 (3.18)	119.3 (4.70)	84.8 (3.34)	36.9 (1.45)	24.2 (0.95)	7.9 (0.31)	1.3 (0.05)	432.7 (17.03)
Average precipitation days (≥ 0.1 mm)	1.2	1.5	2.8	4.9	7.9	12.2	12.4	9.4	6.7	4.7	2.7	1.3	67.7
Average snowy days	2.2	2.7	3.5	2.2	0.2	0	0	0	0	1.3	3.1	2.4	17.6
Average relative humidity (%)	50	44	39	40	45	61	72	74	66	57	54	52	55
Mean monthly sunshine hours	207.9	210.8	252.6	256.3	281.9	255.6	253.6	261.4	253.0	241.8	200.7	194.9	2,870.5
Percentage possible sunshine	70	70	68	64	63	56	56	62	68	71	69	69	66
Source: China Meteorological Administration all-time February high

Climate data for Balihanzhen Town, Ningcheng County, elevation 679 m (2,228 ft), (1991–2020 normals)
Month	Jan	Feb	Mar	Apr	May	Jun	Jul	Aug	Sep	Oct	Nov	Dec	Year
Mean daily maximum °C (°F)	−2.2 (28.0)	1.8 (35.2)	8.6 (47.5)	16.9 (62.4)	23.6 (74.5)	27.0 (80.6)	28.8 (83.8)	27.6 (81.7)	23.2 (73.8)	15.9 (60.6)	6.1 (43.0)	−0.7 (30.7)	14.7 (58.5)
Daily mean °C (°F)	−10.5 (13.1)	−6.4 (20.5)	1.0 (33.8)	9.8 (49.6)	16.8 (62.2)	20.7 (69.3)	22.9 (73.2)	21.3 (70.3)	15.7 (60.3)	8.1 (46.6)	−1.2 (29.8)	−8.3 (17.1)	7.5 (45.5)
Mean daily minimum °C (°F)	−16.9 (1.6)	−13.3 (8.1)	−6.2 (20.8)	2.2 (36.0)	9.4 (48.9)	14.3 (57.7)	17.2 (63.0)	15.2 (59.4)	8.7 (47.7)	1.3 (34.3)	−7.3 (18.9)	−14.3 (6.3)	0.9 (33.6)
Average precipitation mm (inches)	1.1 (0.04)	2.0 (0.08)	6.0 (0.24)	20.5 (0.81)	43.7 (1.72)	96.0 (3.78)	136.5 (5.37)	85.8 (3.38)	42.2 (1.66)	23.3 (0.92)	8.6 (0.34)	1.1 (0.04)	466.8 (18.38)
Average precipitation days (≥ 0.1 mm)	1.2	1.3	2.9	4.6	7.6	13.1	14.0	10.8	7.7	4.3	2.2	1.1	70.8
Average snowy days	1.8	2.3	3.8	1.7	0.1	0	0	0	0	1.1	2.5	2.0	15.3
Average relative humidity (%)	48	43	39	38	43	60	71	72	64	54	52	50	53
Mean monthly sunshine hours	212.7	216.4	257.5	262.0	280.0	248.5	244.7	250.2	243.5	239.7	202.1	203.7	2,861
Percentage possible sunshine	72	72	69	65	62	55	54	59	66	71	69	72	66
Source: China Meteorological Administration

== Gallery ==
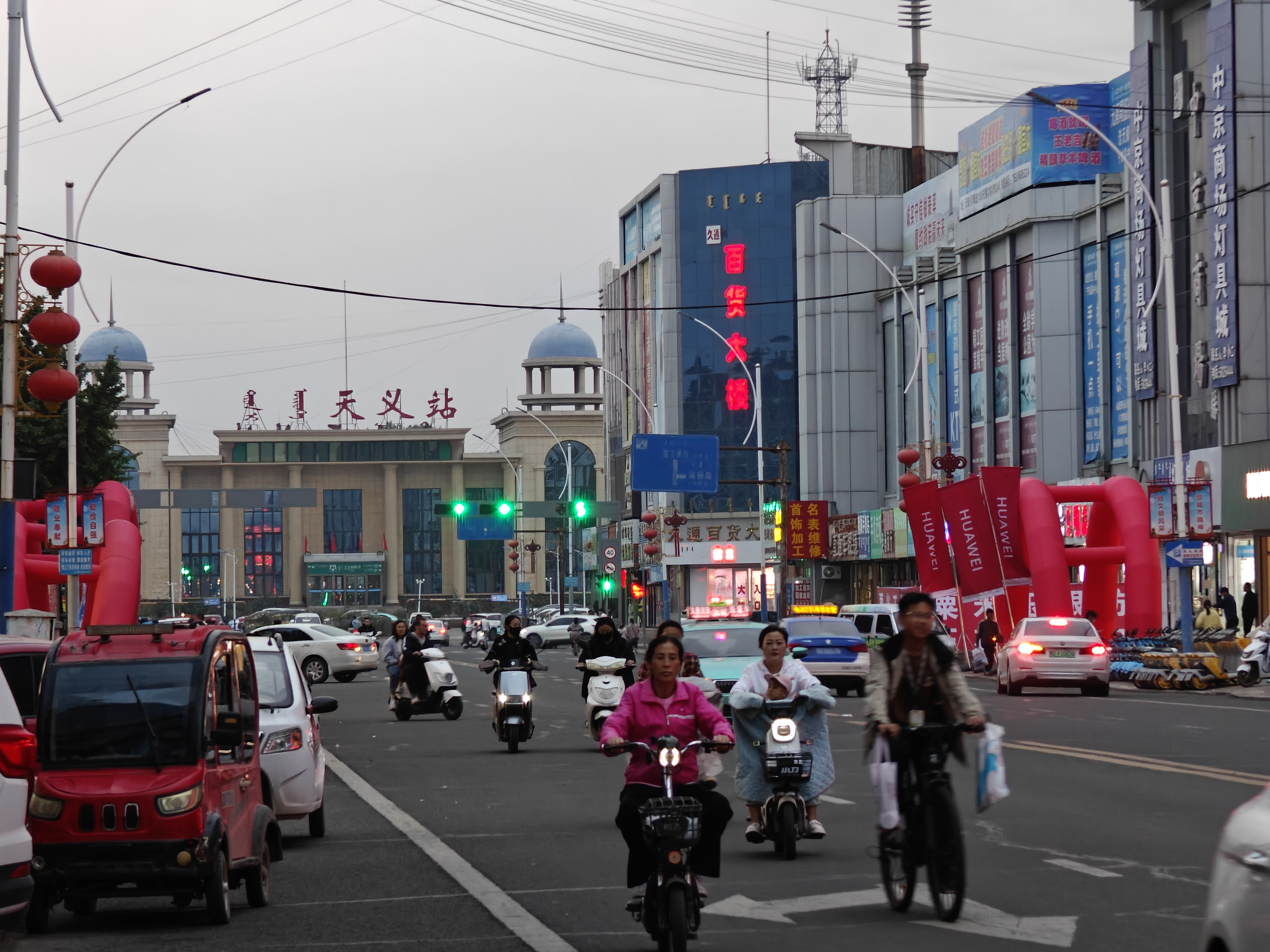
Tianyi Railway Station

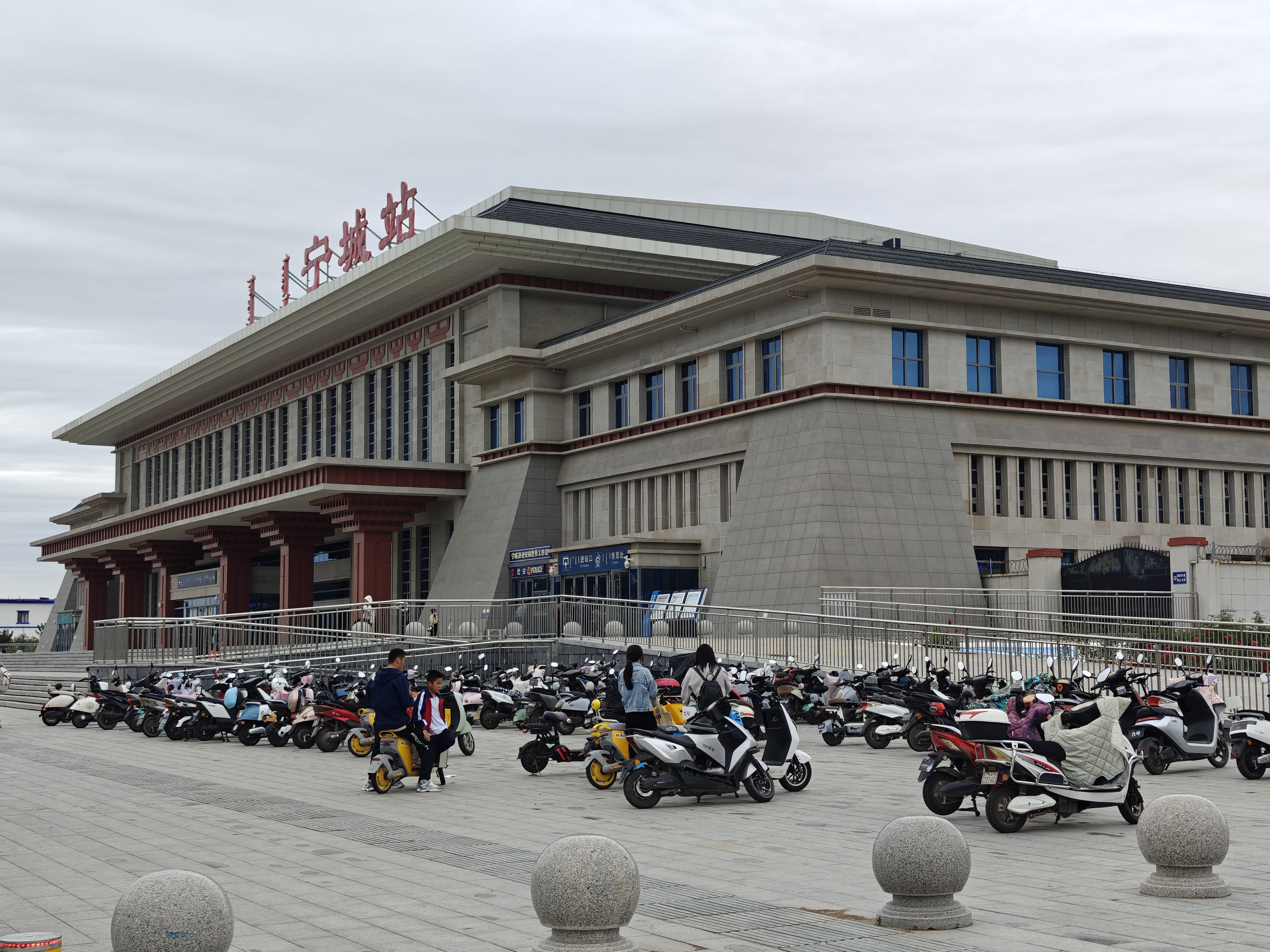
Ningcheng Railway Station

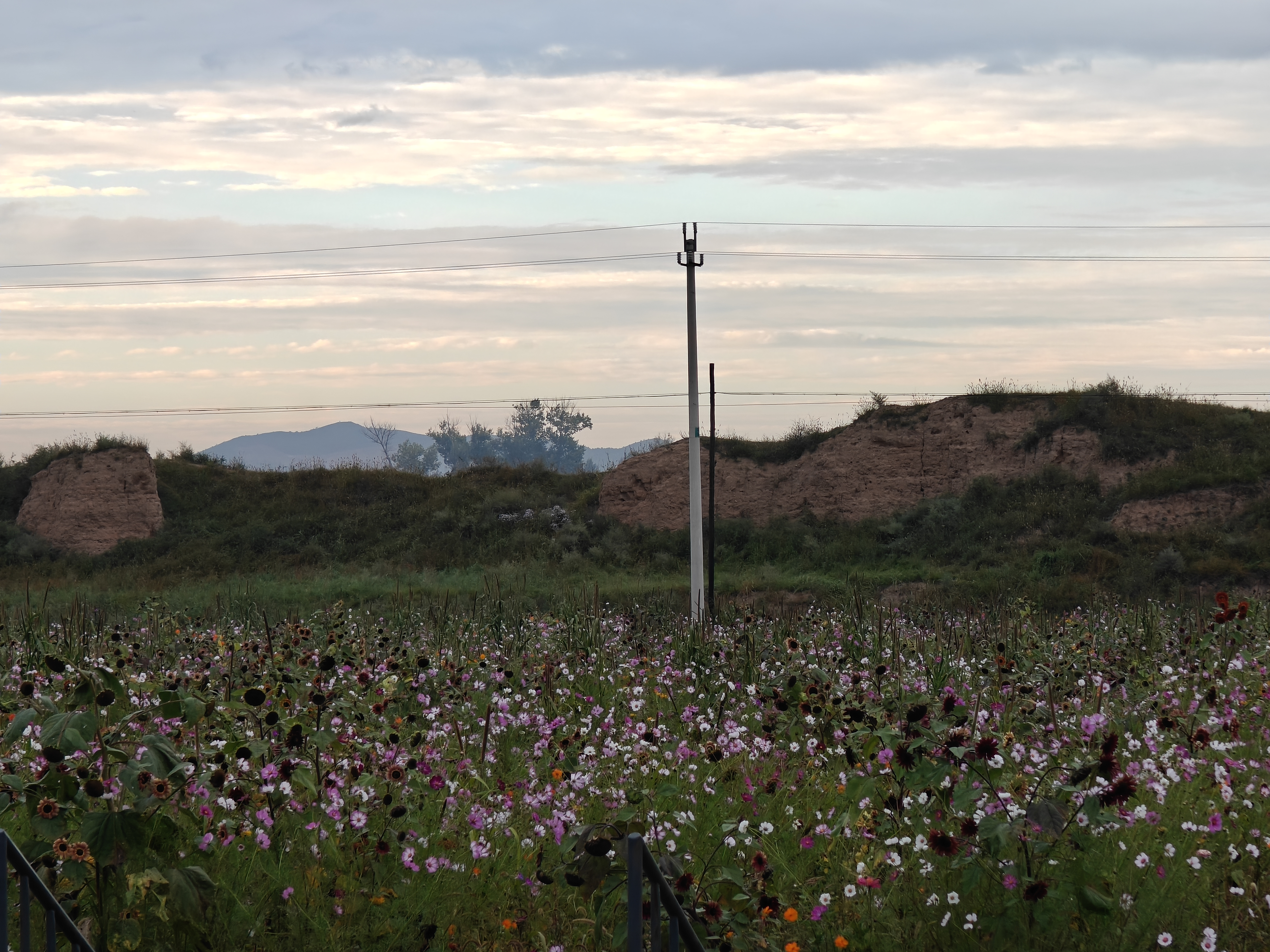
Remnants of the old city walls

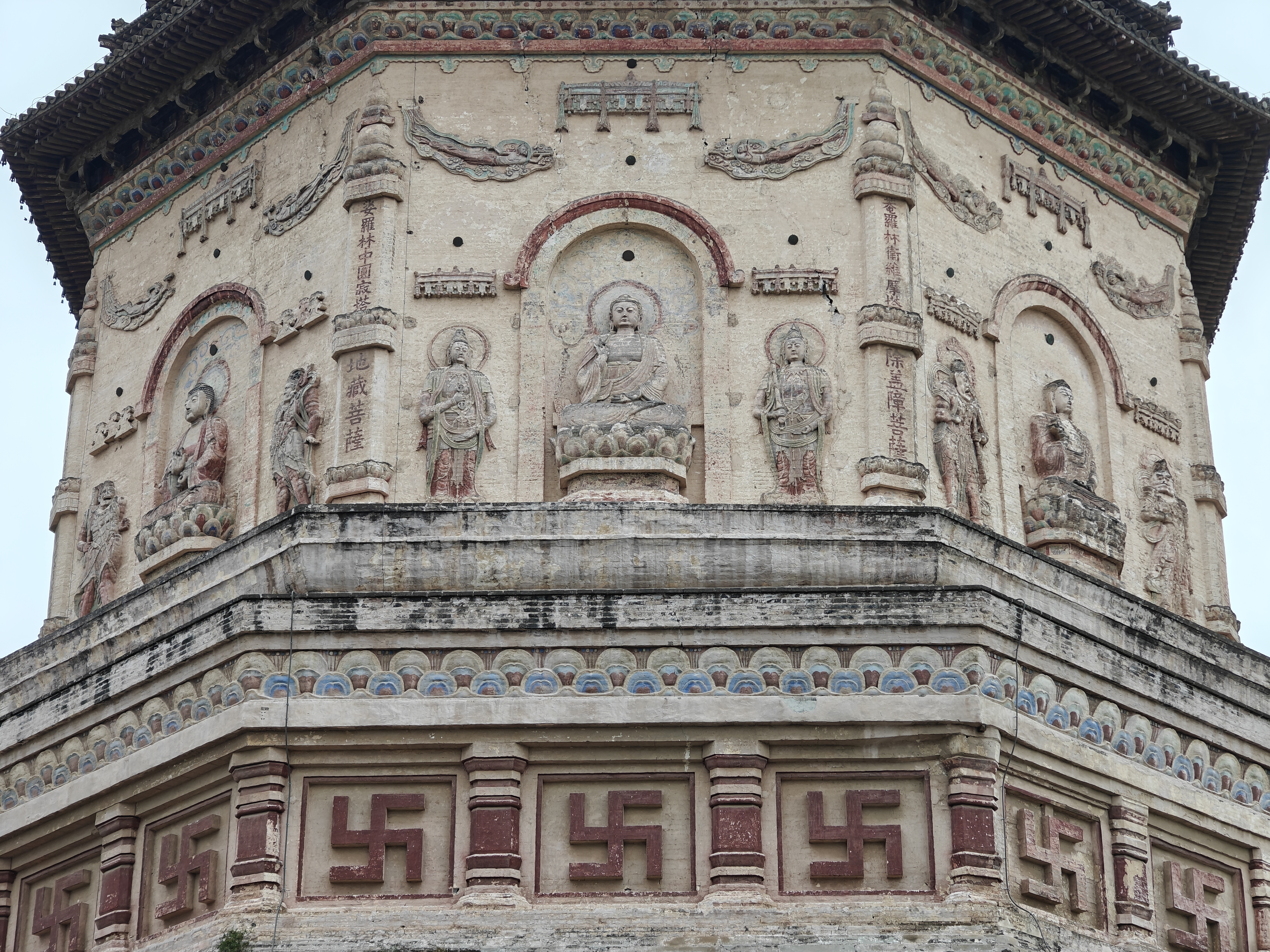
Details on the Daming Pagoda

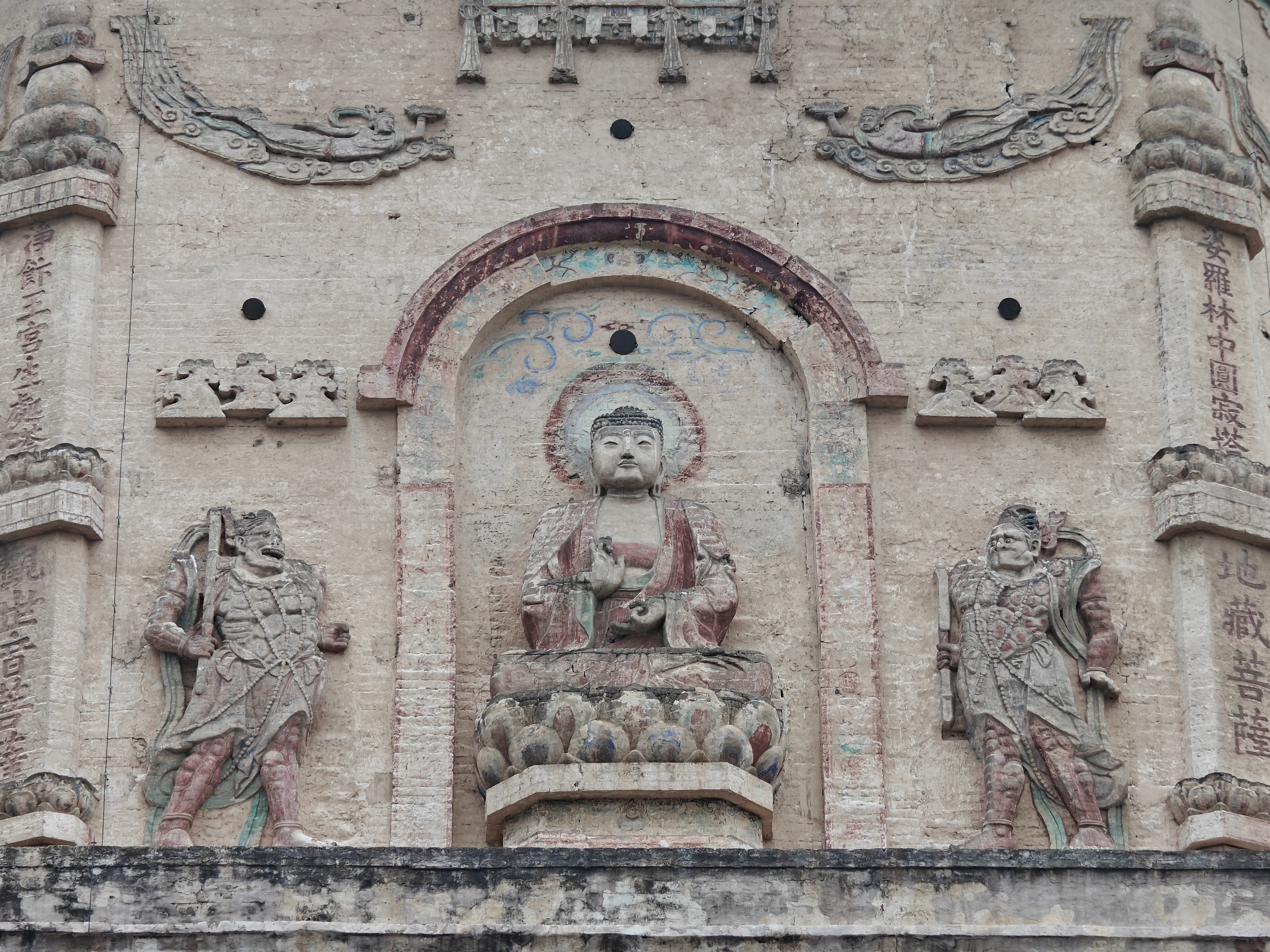
Details on the Daming Pagoda

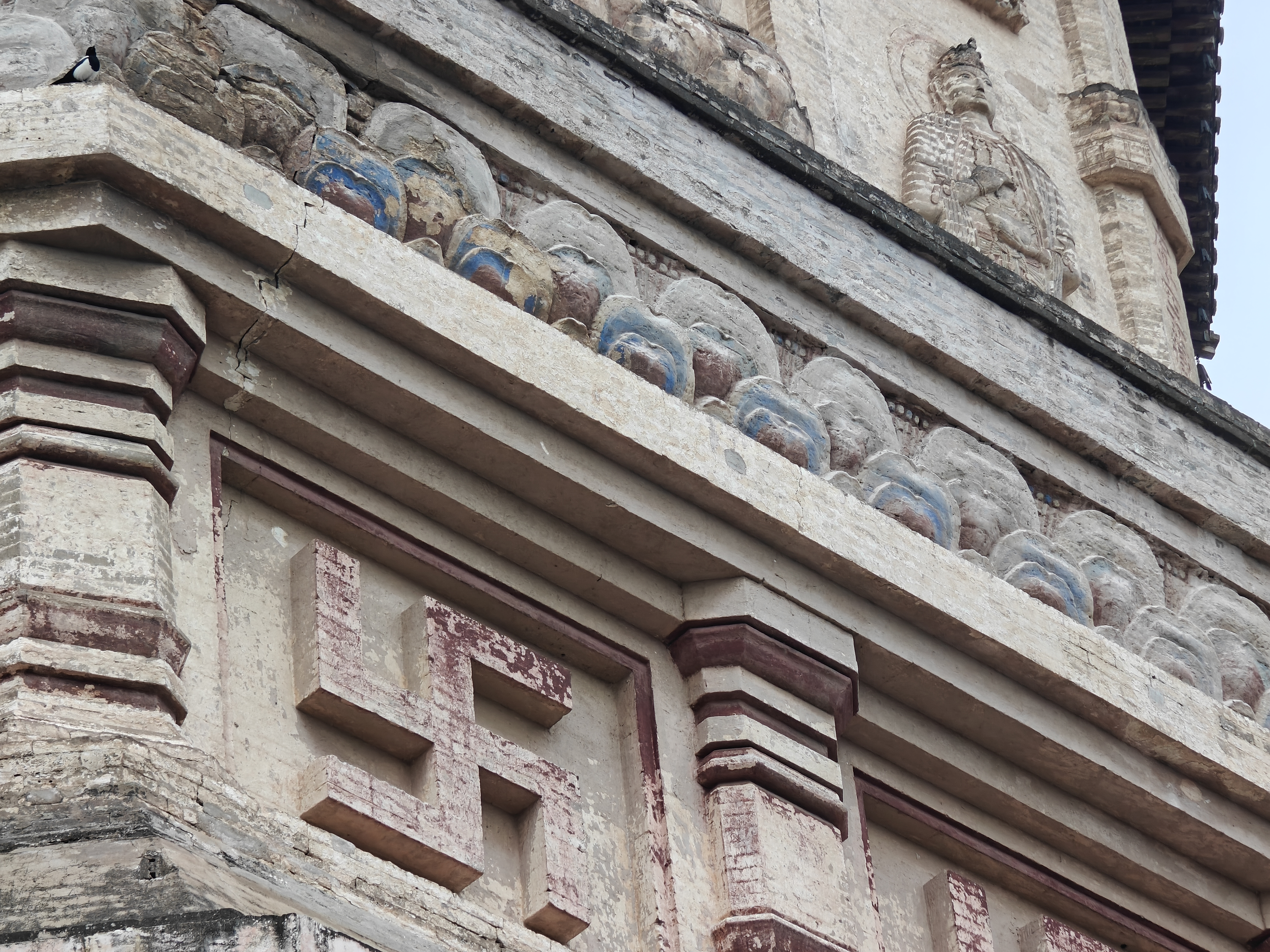
Details on the Daming Pagoda

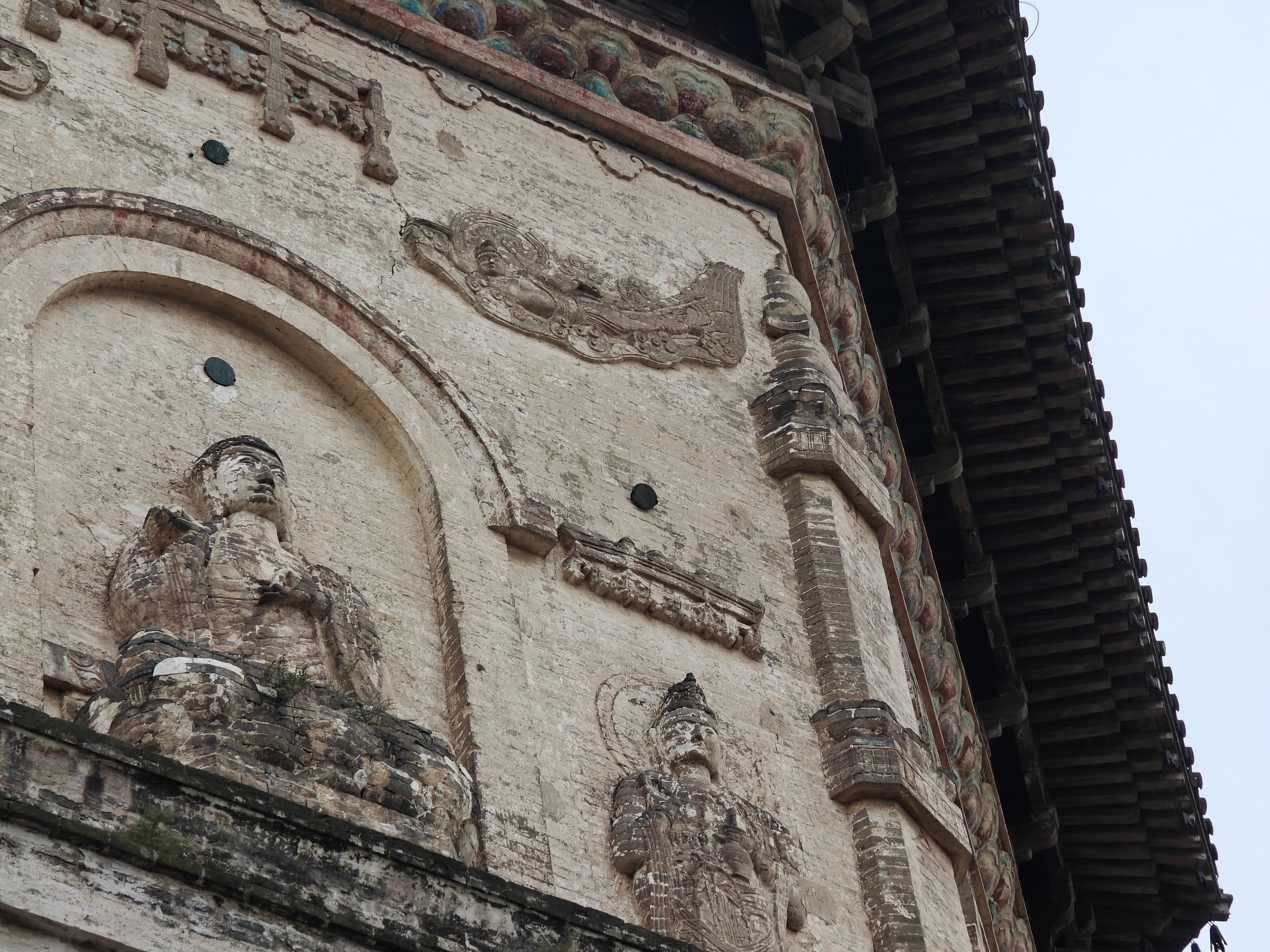
Details on the Daming Pagoda

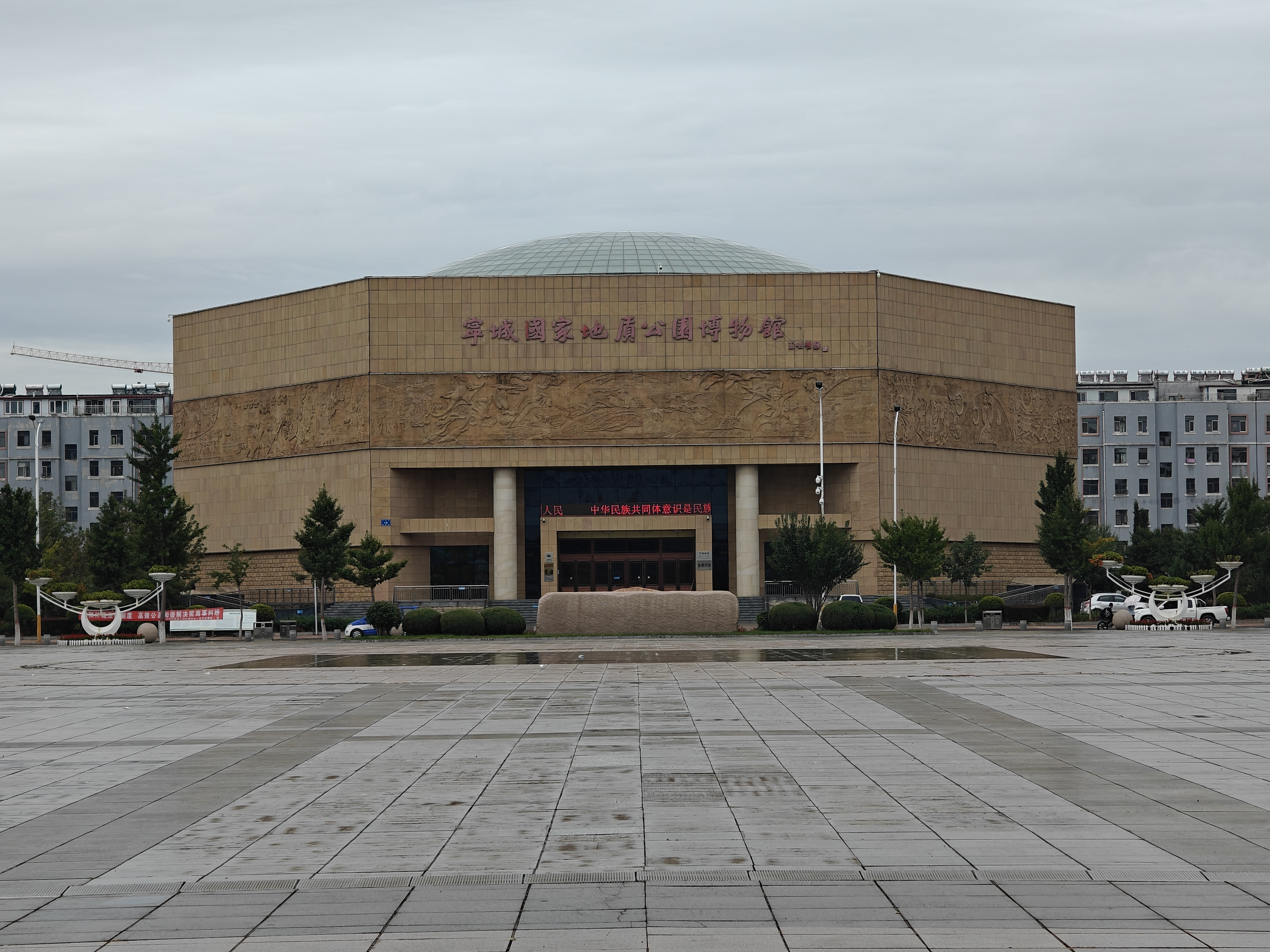
Ningcheng Museum

== See also ==
- 1290 Zhili earthquake
