= Daming Pagoda =

Pagoda in Ningcheng County, China

Coordinates: 41°34′11″N 119°09′20″E

- 辽中都大明塔
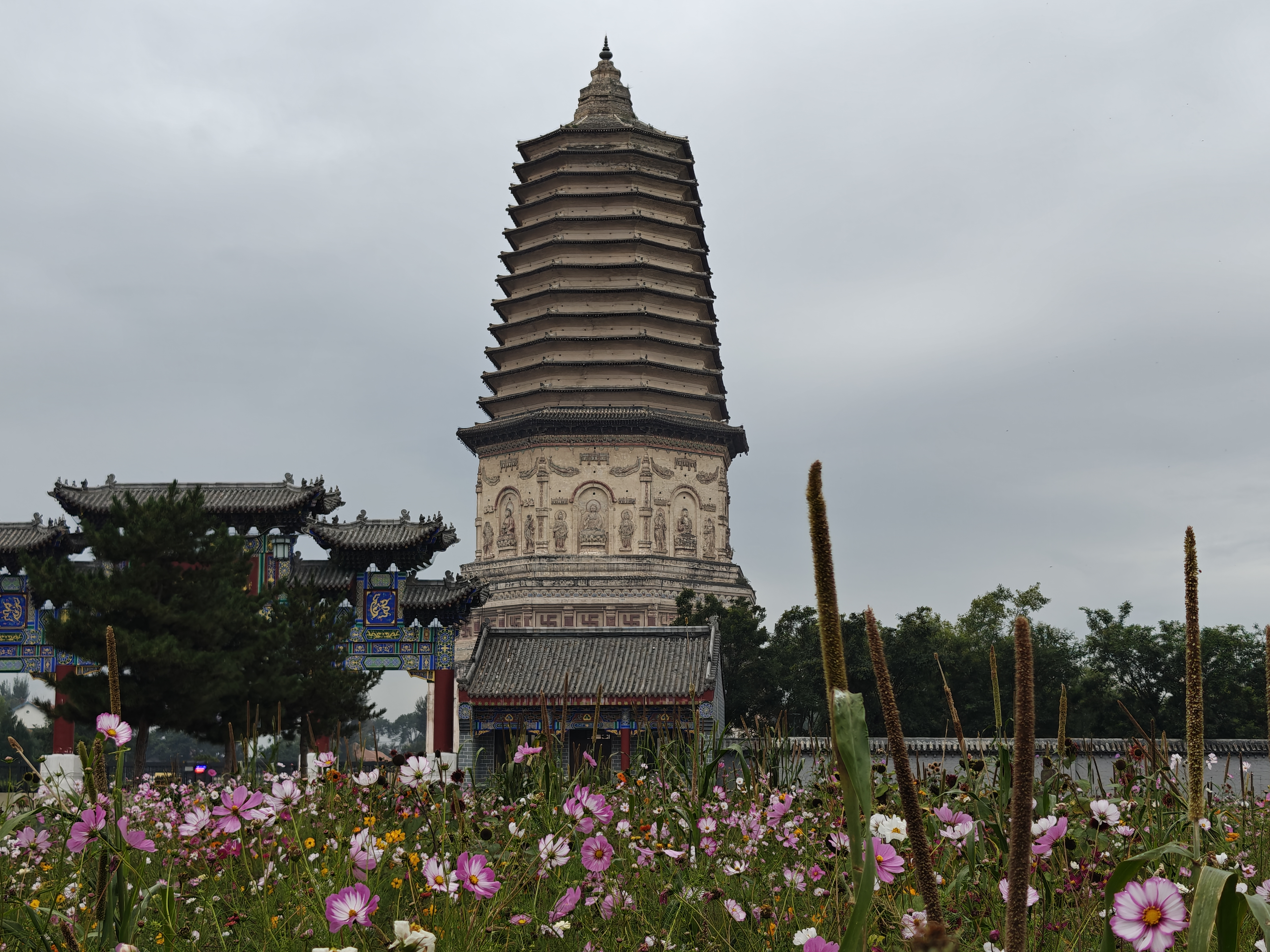

Religion
- Affiliation: Buddhism

Location
- Location: Ningcheng County, Inner Mongolia, China
- Interactive map of Daming Pagoda

Architecture
- Type: Pagoda
- Style: Chinese, Liao dynasty
- Founder: Liao dynasty (possibly Emperor Xingzong)
- Completed: c. 1035 (disputed)

Specifications
- Height (max): 80.22 m (263.2 ft)
- Materials: Brick, stone, wood (eaves)

The Great Pagoda of Liao Zhongdu, commonly known as Daming Pagoda (Chinese: 大明塔), is the largest of the three surviving pagodas from the Liao dynasty's Middle Capital (Zhongdu), located in present-day Ningcheng County, Chifeng, Inner Mongolia. Standing at 80.22 meters (263.2 ft), it ranks as the second-tallest surviving ancient pagoda in China, surpassed only by the Northern Song-era Kaiyuan Temple Pagoda in Dingzhou, Hebei, which stands approximately four meters taller. Additionally, it holds the distinction of being the largest ancient pagoda in China by volume.

== History ==
The pagoda's exact construction date remains uncertain due to conflicting historical records. According to the Yuán Yītǒng Zhì (Records of the Unified Yuan), it was built in 1035 during the reign of Emperor Xingzong of Liao. Another clue comes from an inscription on the pagoda itself, bearing the date "Fourth year of the Shouchang era (1098), fourth month, eighth day", which may indicate its completion or a major renovation.

Over its nearly millennium-long existence, the pagoda has endured natural wear, weathering, and human intervention. The earliest documented repairs occurred in 1854 during the Qing dynasty, as evidenced by a Mongolian inscription on the southern facade reading "Great Qing, Xianfeng Year Jiawu (1854), respectfully repaired." Further restorations took place in the early 20th century, including minor work in 1912 (Republic of China) and a 1937 refurbishment that involved repainting the Buddhist sculptures. In 1974, the Liaoning provincial government reinforced the pagoda's foundation, and in 1982, a major restoration funded by the National Cultural Heritage Administration addressed structural weaknesses, replaced decayed wooden elements, and replicated damaged sculptures and the copper finial.

== Architecture ==
The pagoda is a thirteen-story, octagonal, solid brick structure with a dense-eave (密檐) design, typical of Liao dynasty religious architecture. It rises from a 16.21-meter-high (53.2 ft) Sumeru base, with the lower section constructed from plain brick. Each of the eight facades features a large arched niche housing a seated Buddha, flanked by either attendant bodhisattvas (on the four primary sides) or fierce guardian deities (on the diagonal sides). The main Buddha image on the southern side is particularly notable, depicting Mahavairocana (Dàrì Rúlái) accompanied by exquisitely carved attendant bodhisattvas.

The pagoda's sculptural style reflects Tang dynasty influences, with larger-than-life Buddha figures that are rare among surviving Chinese pagodas. The flying apsaras (feitian) carved above the niches, holding lotus blossoms and floating on clouds, exhibit remarkable fluidity and grace. Meanwhile, the guardian figures on the diagonal sides are rendered with exaggerated musculature and ferocious expressions, wielding vajras (ritual thunderbolt scepters) and glaring menacingly.
