= Chifeng–Kazuo high-speed railway =

High-speed rail line in China

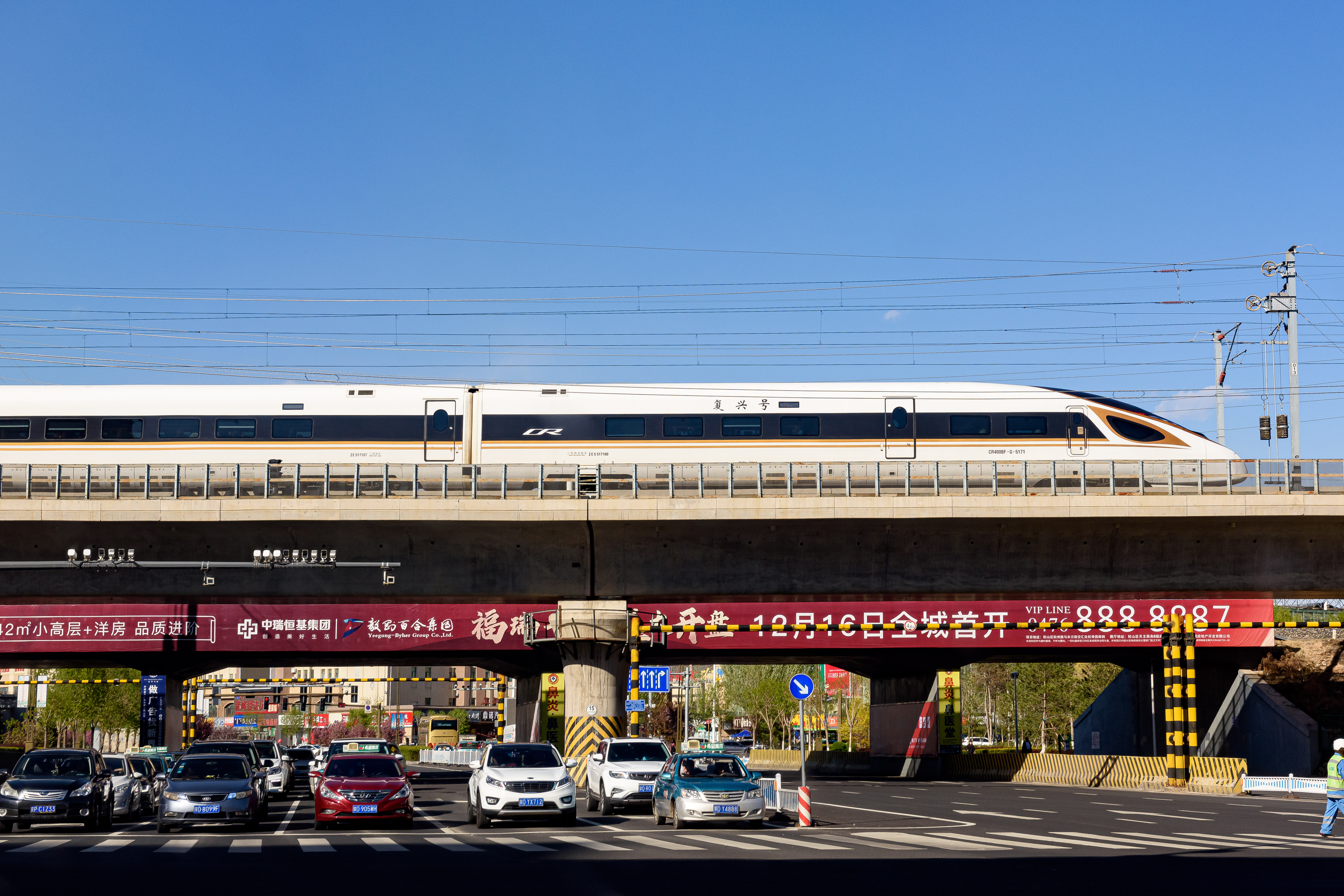
- Train G3671 approaching to Chifeng railway station

Overview
- Native name: 喀赤高速铁路 赤峰至京沈高铁喀左站铁路
- Status: Operational
- Owner: China Railway
- Locale: Inner Mongolia, Liaoning
- Termini: Kazuo; Chifeng
- Stations: 5

Service
- Type: High-speed rail
- System: China Railway High-speed

History
- Opened: June 30, 2020

Technical
- Line length: 165 km (103 mi)
- Track gauge: 1,435 mm (4 ft 8 1/2 in) standard gauge
- Electrification: 25 kV 50 Hz AC (Overhead line)
- Operating speed: 250 km/h (160 mph)

The Chifeng–Kazuo high-speed railway (also referred to in Chinese as the Chika high-speed railway) is a double-track electrified railway connecting Chifeng, Inner Mongolia and Kazuo Station of the Beijing–Shenyang high-speed railway. The line passes through Harqin Zuoyi Mongol Autonomous County and Jianping County, both administered by Chaoyang City. It then passes into areas administered by Chifeng: Ningcheng County and Pingzhuang town of Yuanbaoshan District to the existing Chifeng station (formerly known as Chifeng West station) on the Beijing–Tongliao railway. The main line has a total length of 157 kilometres and the target design speed is 250 kilometres per hour. A connecting curve to the Beijing–Shenyang high-speed railway on the west side of Kazuo station to/from Beijing is proposed. The railway was built in the second half of 2016 and joint commissioning and testing began on April 1, 2020. It was officially opened for operation on June 30, 2020.
