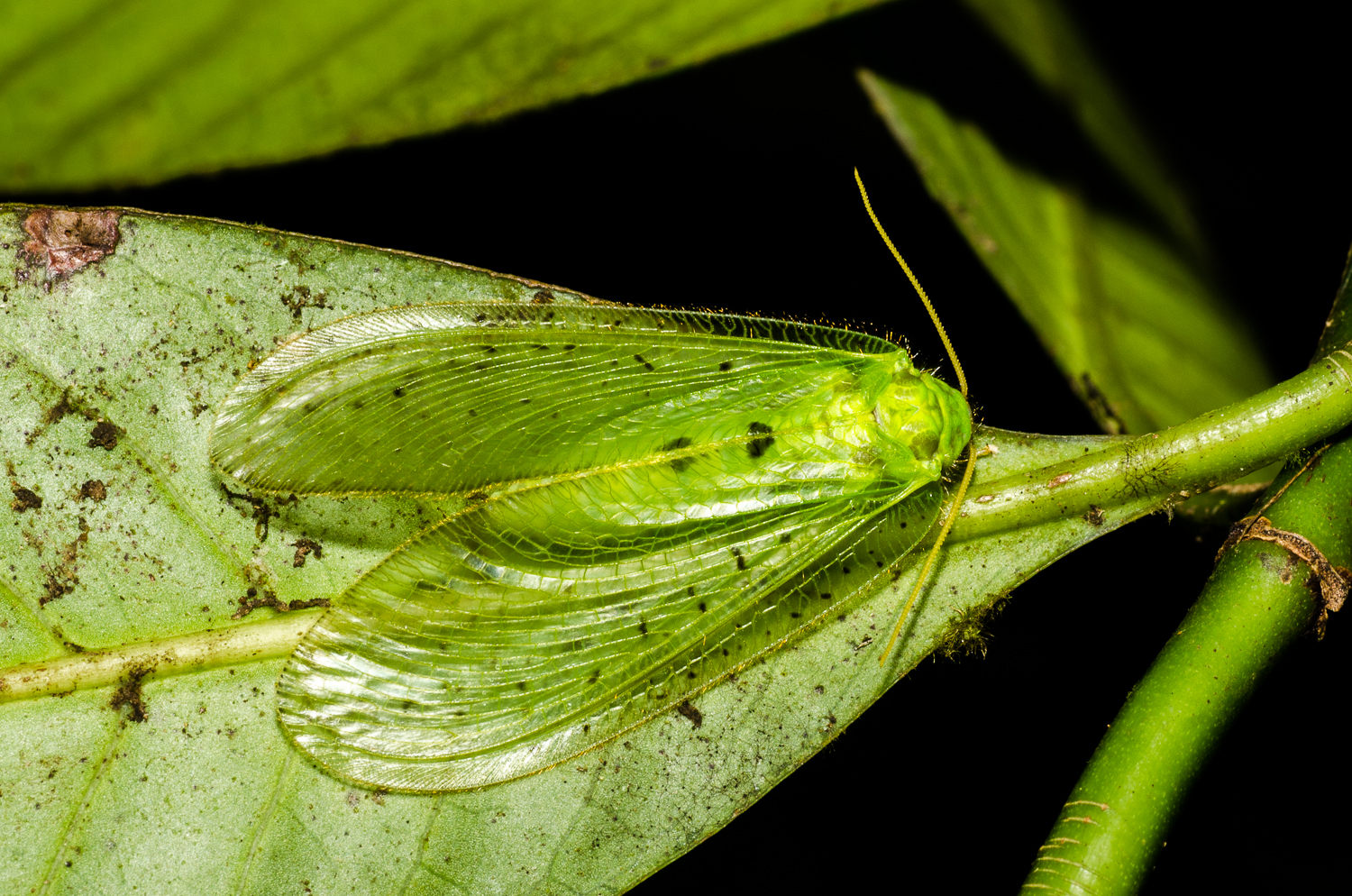
- Rapisma tamilanum from the Western Ghats

Scientific classification
- Domain: Eukaryota
- Kingdom: Animalia
- Phylum: Arthropoda
- Class: Insecta
- Order: Neuroptera
- Family: Ithonidae
- Genus: Rapisma; McLachlan, 1866

Species
- Rapisma almonarum; Rapisma burmanum; Rapisma corundum; Rapisma intanonum; Rapisma malayanum; Rapisma nepalense; Rapisma sabahnum; Rapisma tamilanum; Rapisma viridipenne

= Rapisma =

Genus of lacewings

Rapisma is a genus of moth lacewings, Ithonidae. They were previously placed in family of their own, Rapismatidae. They are mostly brown or green and the body is broad and the head is short and retracted under the pronotum. Some species show sexual dimorphism in wing shape. Species identification is based on genitalia characters and requires the dissection of specimens. The genus has species that are distributed along the Himalayas from Nepal to Thailand, Malaysia and South East Asia. One species, R. tamilanum, has a slightly more disjunct distribution and occurs in the Western Ghats of southern India.

The larva has not been described but may be subterranean or found in leaf litter.
