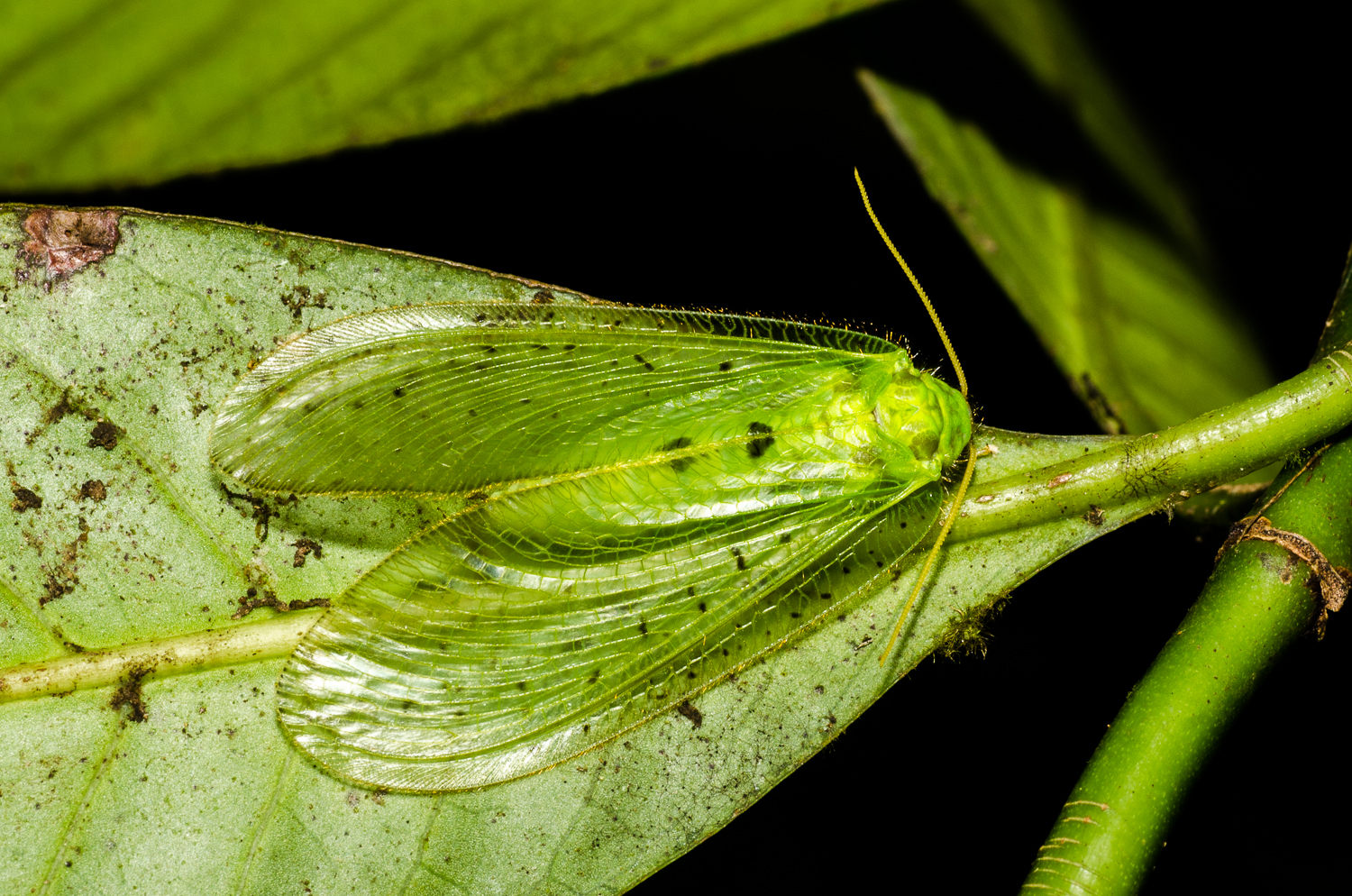
- Rapisma tamilanum from the Western Ghats

Scientific classification
- Kingdom: Animalia
- Phylum: Arthropoda
- Clade: Pancrustacea
- Class: Insecta
- Order: Neuroptera
- Clade: Geoneuroptera
- Superfamily: Ithonoidea
- Family: Ithonidae; Newman, 1838

Genera
- See text

Synonyms
- Polystoechotidae; Rapismatidae

= Ithonidae =

Ithonidae Temporal range: Early Jurassic–Recent

Family of insects

Ithonidae, commonly called moth lacewings and giant lacewings, is a small family of winged insects of the insect order Neuroptera. The family contains a total of ten living genera, and over a dozen extinct genera described from fossils. The modern Ithonids have a notably disjunct distribution, while the extinct genera had a more global range. The family is considered one of the most primitive living neuropteran families. The family has been expanded twice, first to include the genus Rapisma, formerly placed in the monotypic family Rapismatidae, and then in 2010 to include the genera that had been placed into the family Polystoechotidae. Both Rapismatidae and Polystoechotidae have been shown to nest into Ithonidae sensu lato. The larvae of ithonids are grub-like, subterranean and likely phytophagous (plant feeding).

== Description and ecology ==
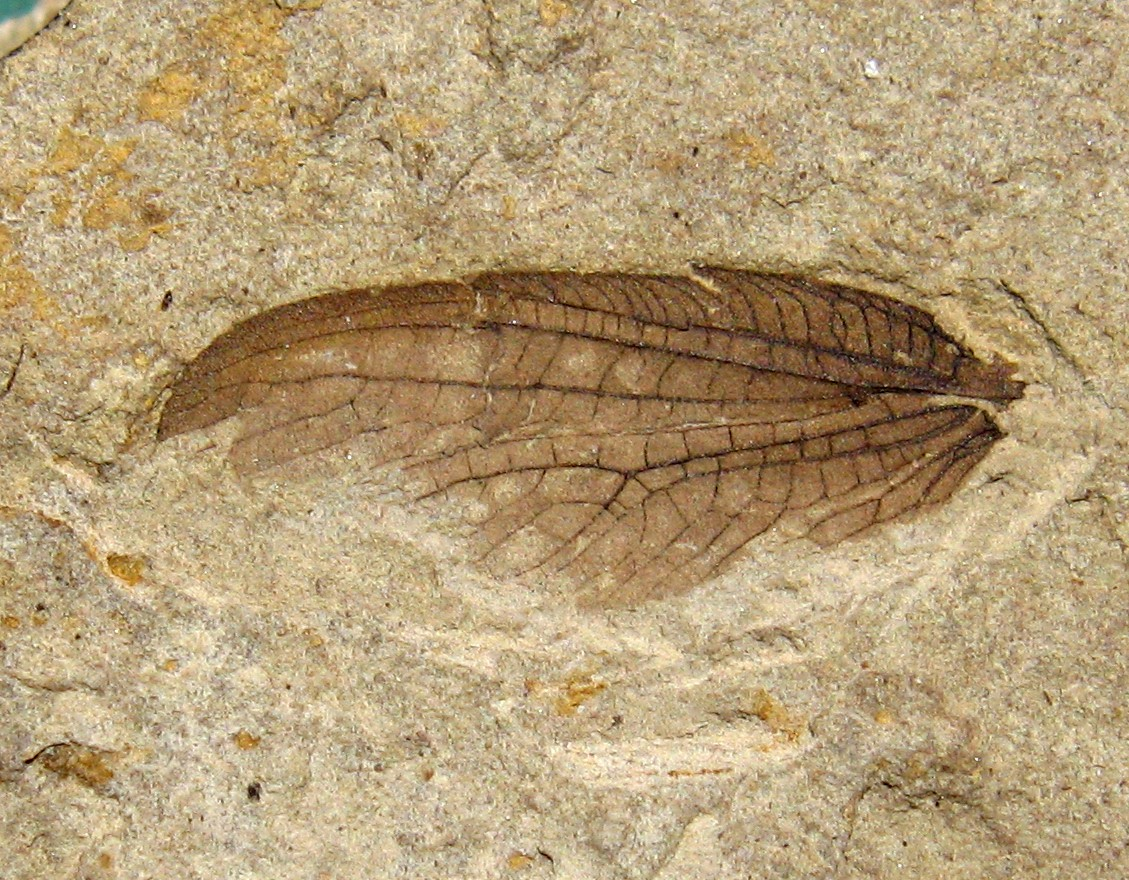
Allorapisma chuorum holotype

Ithonidae are typically medium to large-sized neuropterans. P. S. Welch conducted research in 1914 on "Polystoechotidae" larvae resulting in the conclusion that the larvae were carnivorous. The larvae live a subterranean life. The first instar stage for modern larvae is grub-like, resembling those of scarabaeiform beetles. Robert J. Tillyard first described the larvae of Ithone fusca in 1922, noting the unusual grub-like shape, similar to fruit-chafers and June beetles, as unique among Neuroptera species. The odd larval shape of Ithionidae larvae has been, and continues to be, a subject of interest among entomologists. Tillyard suggested the larvae to be carnivorous, preying upon Scarabaeidae larvae, attacking with the large mandibles and "sucking them dry". Further study by Faulkner in 1990 has shown the immature Ithonidae to be phytophagous, a condition unique among neuropterans. The adults of at least some ithonids are carnivorous. Mass emergences have been recorded from the genera Oliarces and Ithone, usually associated with seasonal rains.

== Range ==
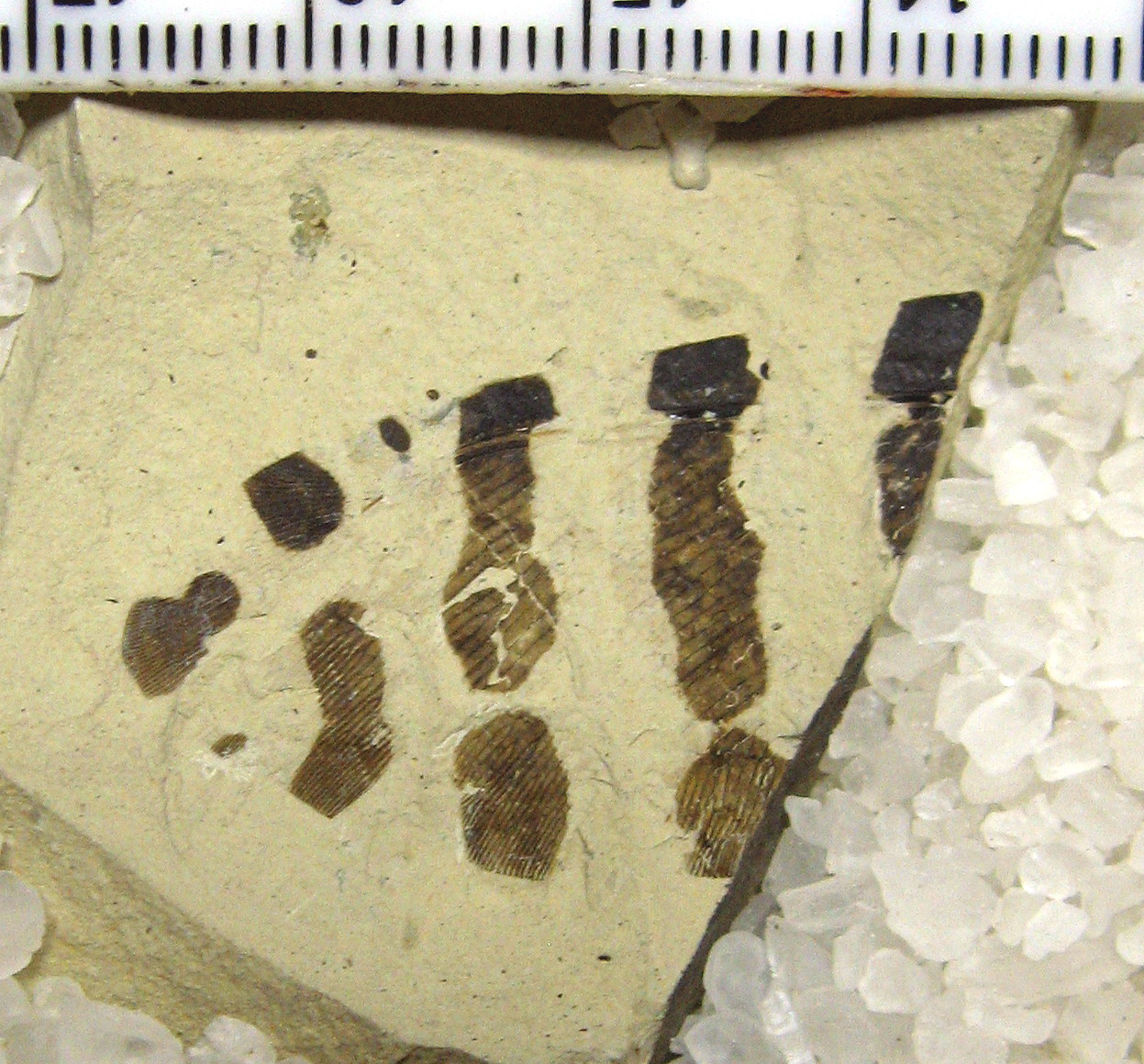
Palaeopsychops marringerae fossil, 50 million years old, Washington, USA

Modern Ithonidae genera are distributed in both the Western and Eastern Hemispheres, with three species in the Nearctic realm, and four in the Neotropical realm of the Western Hemisphere. Of the genera in the Eastern Hemisphere, three are found in the Australasian realm and one in Indomalaya. The habitats are varied with the genera falling into two general groups, arid taxa and forest taxa. Those genera found in arid regions are Ithone, Varnia, and Oliarces. Four of the Neotropical species inhabit areas with forested microthermal to lower mesothermal climates. Polystoechotes has the widest modern range with P. punctatus inhabiting forests across North America south along the mountains to Panama and P. gazullai inhabiting forests in Central Chile. The North American range of P. punctatus has diminished, disappearing from eastern North America by the 1950s, and now appears restricted to Western North America. Platystoechotes lineatus, the sole species in Platystoechotes, is restricted in range to the Sierra Nevada mountains in California, USA. The remaining modern species Fontecilla graphicus shares habitat with P. gazullai, also inhabiting forests in Central Chile.

Ithonid specimens have been described from fossils dating between the Early Jurassic and the late Eocene, and from sites that indicate a wider geographic range then seen in the modern taxa. Early genera from the Jurassic have been found in China, Kazakhstan, Kyrgyzstan, and Tajikistan. The next grouping of Mesozoic fossils belong to the Cretaceous genus Principiala, which has species described from Brazil, England and tentatively China. The youngest paleorange for the family includes sites in western North America such as the Florissant formation in Colorado and the Okanagan Highland sites in Washington, USA and British Columbia, Canada. Species of the genus Palaeopsychops have been found in the Eocene Fur Formation of Denmark. The genus Elektrithone, described in 2014, extended the family's fossil range to include Baltic amber.

== Systematics and taxonomy ==
Puripolystoechotes pumilus, Jiulongshan Formation

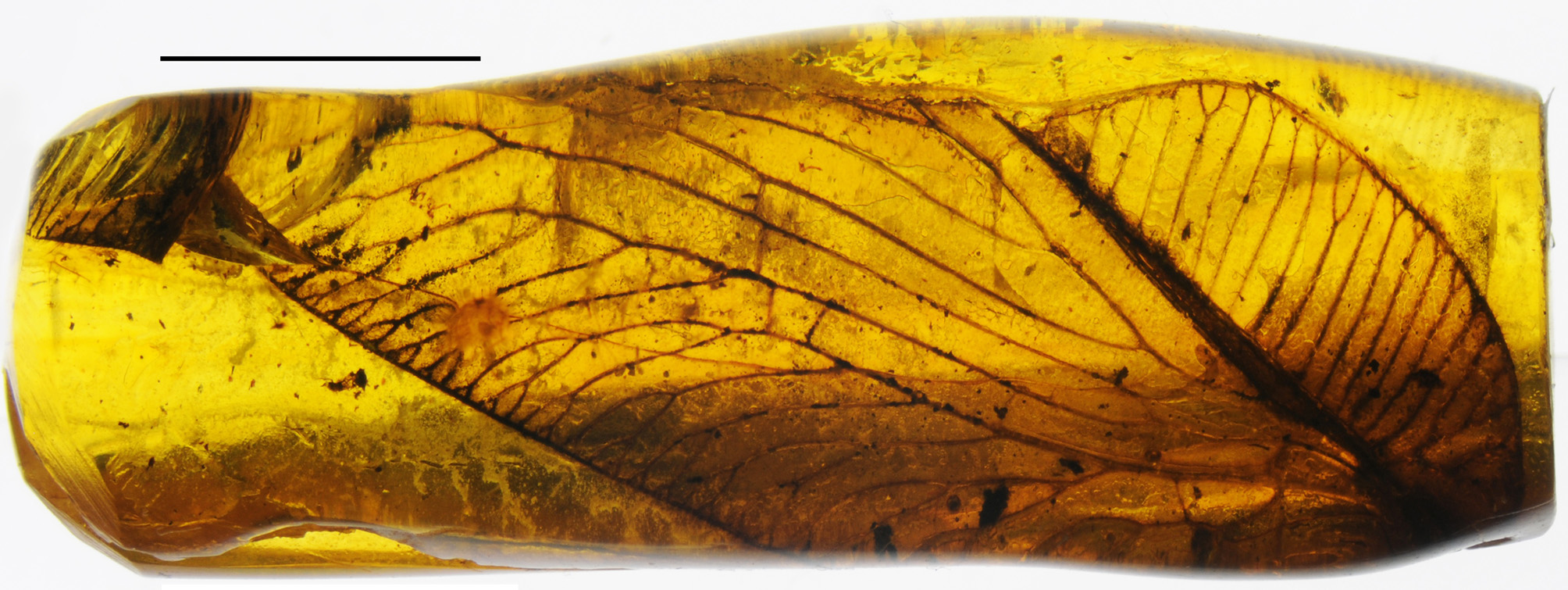
Elektrithone expectata Baltic amber

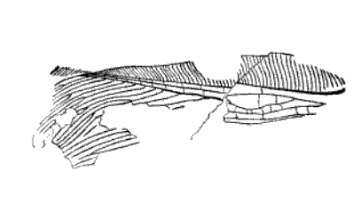
Ricaniella antiquata Allenby Formation (1895 illustration)

The Ithonidae are regarded as the most primitive living members of Neuroptera. The genus Rapisma was formerly considered to be the sole genus in the family Rapismatidae, however work in the 1990s and 2000s resulted in the inclusion of Rapisma in Ithonidae. The history of Ithonidae and Polysteochotidae is more complex, with several genera having been transferred between each other over the years. Phylogenetic analysis and associated genetic sequencing of three genetic markers for the two families was published in 2010. The results of the analysis showed a clear grouping of the three Australian genera Ithone, Megalithone and Varnia in the family Ithonidae, while all the remaining genera are nested into an expanded Polysteochotidae, given the overall interrelation between the groups, the authors opted to combine the two into an expanded single family Ithonidae.

Ithonidae forms a sister group to the remaining families in the suborder Hemerobiiformia. Ithonidae includes a number of extinct genera described from fossils dating between the Early Jurassic and the Late Eocene. The genera of Ithonidae are clustered into three informal groups:

The Ithonid group:

- †Guithone Zheng, Ren, & wang, 2016 Middle Jurassic (Callovian), Daohugou, China
- Ithone Newman, 1838 Australia
- Megalithone Riek, 1974 Australia
- Varnia Walker, 1860 Australia

The Polystoechotid group:

- †Elektrithone Makarkin, Wedmann, & Weiterschan, 2014 (Eocene, Baltic Amber)
- Fontecilla Navás, 1931 Chile
- †Frustumopsychops Khramov 2014 Late Jurassic (Tithonian), Shar-Teg, Mongolia
- †Jurapolystoechotes Ren, Engel, & Lü, 2002 Middle Jurassic (Callovian) Daohugou Bed, China
- †Kirgisella Martynov, 1925 Karabastau Formation, Late Jurassic (Oxfordian/Kimmeridgian), Kazakhstan
- †Lasiosmylus Ren & Guo, 1996 Early Cretaceous (Aptian), Yixian Formation, China
- †Mesopolystoechus Martynov, 1937 Early Jurassic (Toarcian), Sulyukta Formation, Kyrgyzstan; Callovian, Jiulongshan Formation, China
- †Osmyloides Panfilov, 1980 (Middle/Late Jurassic Callovian/Oxfordian, Karabastau Formation, Kazakhstan)
- †Palaeopsychops Anderson, 2001 Eocene (Ypresian), Coldwater Beds, Canada, Fur Formation, Denmark, Klondike Mountain Formation, USA
- †Paleopterocalla (Panfilov, 1980) (Callovian/Oxfordian, Karabastau Formation, Kazakhstan)
- †Panfilovdvia (Panfilov, 1980) (Callovian/Oxfordian, Karabastau Formation, Kazakhstan)
- Platystoechotes Carpenter, 1940 Western North America
- †Polystoechotites Archibald & Makarkin, 2006 (Eocene, Coldwater Beds, Canada, Klondike Mountain Formation, Florissant Formation, USA
- Polystoechotes Burmeister, 1839 North America, Chile
- †Puripolystoechotes Yang et al. 2019 (Daohugou, China, Callovian)
- †Ricaniella Meunier, 1897 Eocene (Ypresian), Allenby Formation, Canada

The Rapismatid Group:

- †Allorapisma Makarkin & Archibald, 2009 Eocene (Ypresian), Klondike Mountain Formation, Washington
- Adamsiana Penny, 1996 Central America
- †Burmithone Lu et al., 2017 Late Cretaceous (Cenomanian), Burmese amber, Myanmar
- Narodona Navás, 1929 Mexico
- Oliarces Banks, 1908 Western North America
- †Principiala Makarkin & Menon, 2007 Early Cretaceous (Barremian), Weald Clay, United Kingdom, Aptian Crato Formation, Brazil
- †Sinuijuala So & Won, 2022 Early Cretaceous (Aptian) Sinuiju Formation, North Korea
- Rapisma McLachlan, 1866 South, Southeast and Eastern Asia

- - Polysteochotidae
    - - Adamsiana
      - - - †Allorapisma
          - †Principiala
        - Rapisma
      - Oliarces
    - Platystoechotes
    - - Fontecilla
      - Polystoechotes
  - Ithonidae
    - Ithone
    - Megalithone
    - Varnia
