= Lebia subgrandis =

Scientific classification
- Domain: Eukaryota
- Kingdom: Animalia
- Phylum: Arthropoda
- Class: Insecta
- Order: Coleoptera
- Suborder: Adephaga
- Family: Carabidae
- Genus: Lebia
- Species: L. subgrandis

Binomial name
- Lebia subgrandis Madge, 1967

Species of beetle

Lebia subgrandis is a species of ground beetle in the family Carabidae, found in North America.
