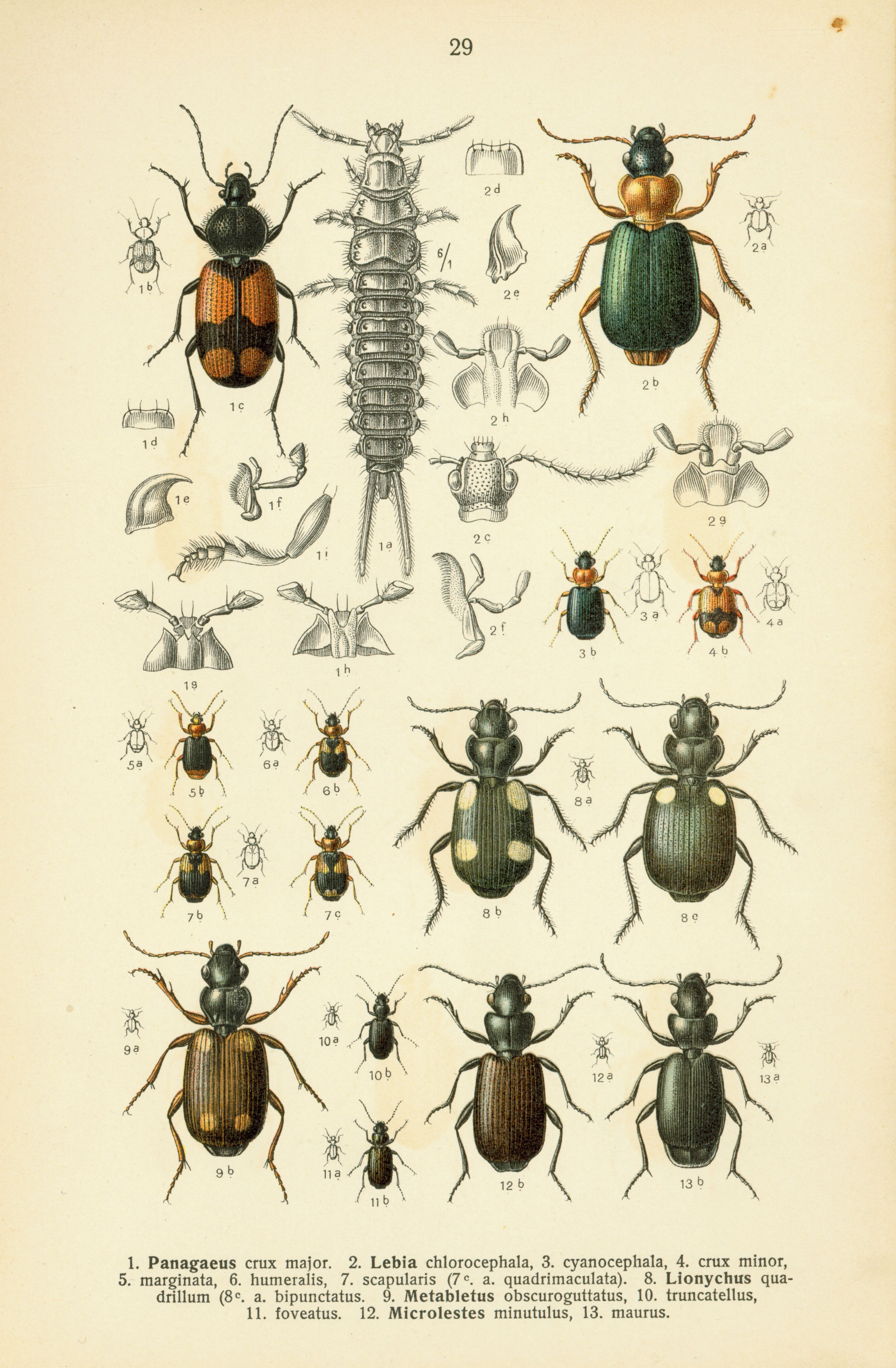

Scientific classification
- Domain: Eukaryota
- Kingdom: Animalia
- Phylum: Arthropoda
- Class: Insecta
- Order: Coleoptera
- Suborder: Adephaga
- Family: Carabidae
- Genus: Lebia
- Species: L. humeralis

Binomial name
- Lebia humeralis Dejean, 1825

= Lebia humeralis =

Species of beetle

Lebia humeralis is a species of ground beetles in the Harpalinae subfamily that can be found in Austria, Bulgaria, Czech Republic, Greece, Hungary, Italy (including Sardinia and Sicily), Moldova, Romania, Slovakia, Switzerland, Ukraine, and in all Yugoslavian states and southern part of Russia.
