= Lebia moesta =

Scientific classification
- Domain: Eukaryota
- Kingdom: Animalia
- Phylum: Arthropoda
- Class: Insecta
- Order: Coleoptera
- Suborder: Adephaga
- Family: Carabidae
- Genus: Lebia
- Species: L. moesta

Binomial name
- Lebia moesta LeConte, 1850

Species of beetle

Lebia moesta is a species of ground beetle in the family Carabidae. It is found in North America.
