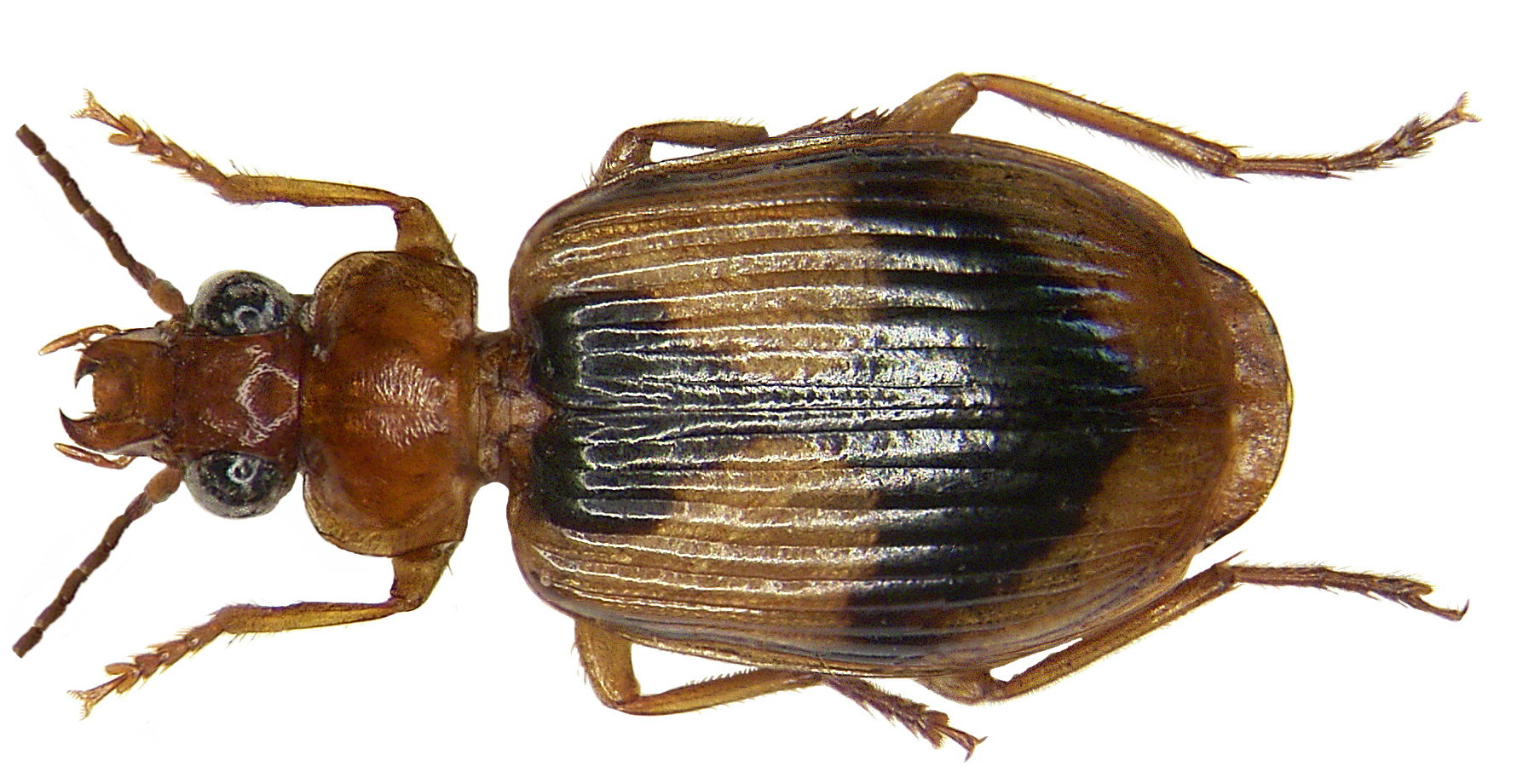

Scientific classification
- Kingdom: Animalia
- Phylum: Arthropoda
- Clade: Pancrustacea
- Class: Insecta
- Order: Coleoptera
- Suborder: Adephaga
- Family: Carabidae
- Genus: Lebia
- Species: L. darlingtoniana

Binomial name
- Lebia darlingtoniana Baehr, 2004

= Lebia darlingtoniana =

Species of beetle

Lebia darlingtoniana is a species of beetle in the family Carabidae.

== Description ==
Adult beetles are 8.5 millimetres (0.33 in) in length.

== Distribution ==
The species can be found in Papua New Guinea and Indonesia (Irian Jaya, Batanta island, and Waywesar).
