= Lebia guttula =

Scientific classification
- Domain: Eukaryota
- Kingdom: Animalia
- Phylum: Arthropoda
- Class: Insecta
- Order: Coleoptera
- Suborder: Adephaga
- Family: Carabidae
- Genus: Lebia
- Species: L. guttula

Binomial name
- Lebia guttula LeConte, 1851

Species of beetle

Lebia guttula is a blackish-brown species of beetle in the family Carabidae. It is found in Alberta and British Columbia, Canada as well as southern California, western Texas and southern New Mexico.
