= Lebia miranda =

Scientific classification
- Kingdom: Animalia
- Phylum: Arthropoda
- Clade: Pancrustacea
- Class: Insecta
- Order: Coleoptera
- Suborder: Adephaga
- Family: Carabidae
- Genus: Lebia
- Species: L. miranda

Binomial name
- Lebia miranda (G. Horn, 1872)

Species of beetle

Lebia miranda is a species of ground beetle in the family Carabidae. It is found in North America.
