= Lebia tuckeri =

Scientific classification
- Kingdom: Animalia
- Phylum: Arthropoda
- Class: Insecta
- Order: Coleoptera
- Suborder: Adephaga
- Family: Carabidae
- Genus: Lebia
- Species: L. tuckeri

Binomial name
- Lebia tuckeri (Casey, 1920)

Species of beetle

Lebia tuckeri is a species of ground beetle in the family Carabidae. It is found in North America.
