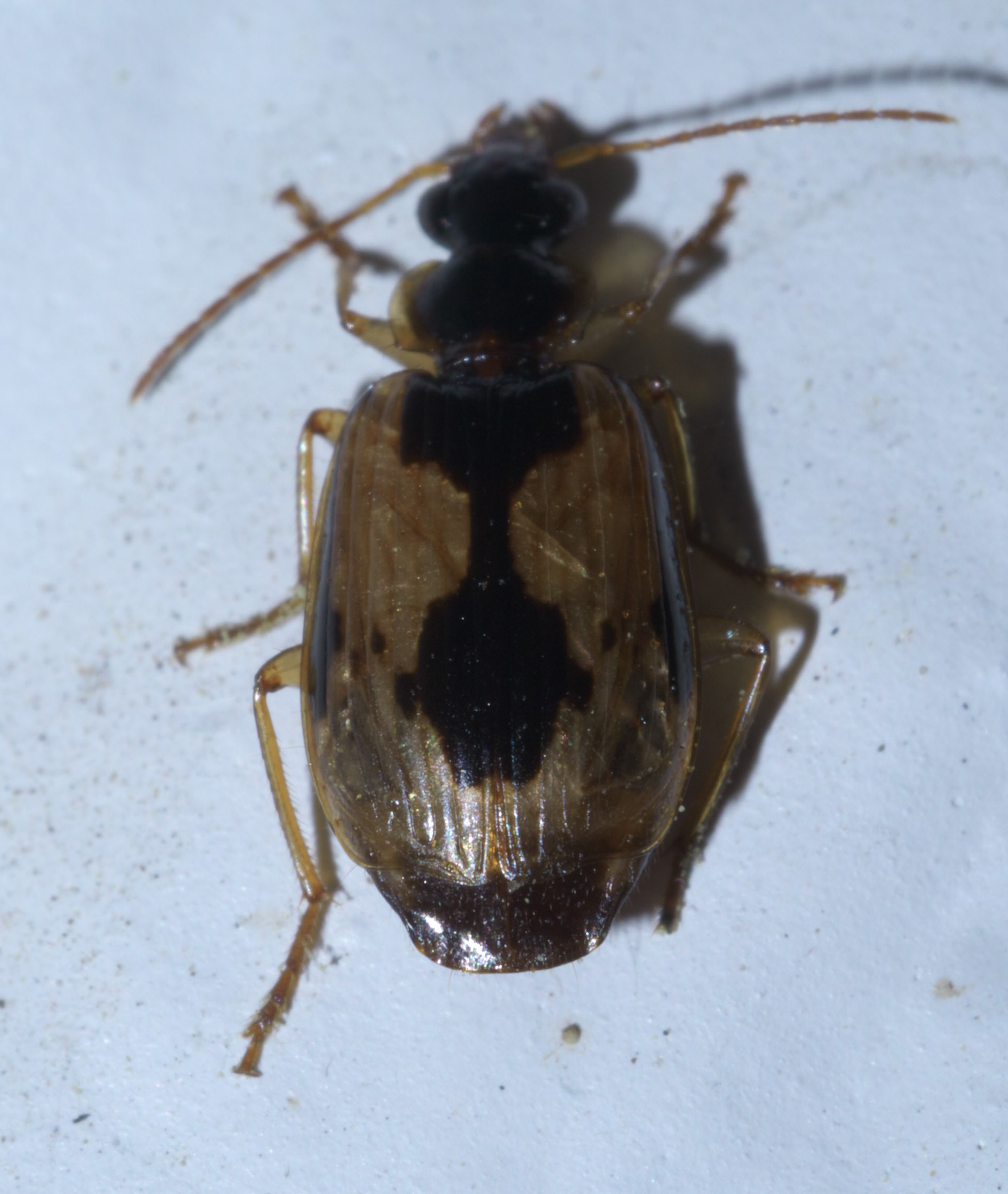

Scientific classification
- Domain: Eukaryota
- Kingdom: Animalia
- Phylum: Arthropoda
- Class: Insecta
- Order: Coleoptera
- Suborder: Adephaga
- Family: Carabidae
- Genus: Lebia
- Species: L. fuscata

Binomial name
- Lebia fuscata Dejean, 1825

= Lebia fuscata =

Species of beetle

Lebia fuscata is a species of beetle in the family Carabidae. It is found in Canada and the United States.

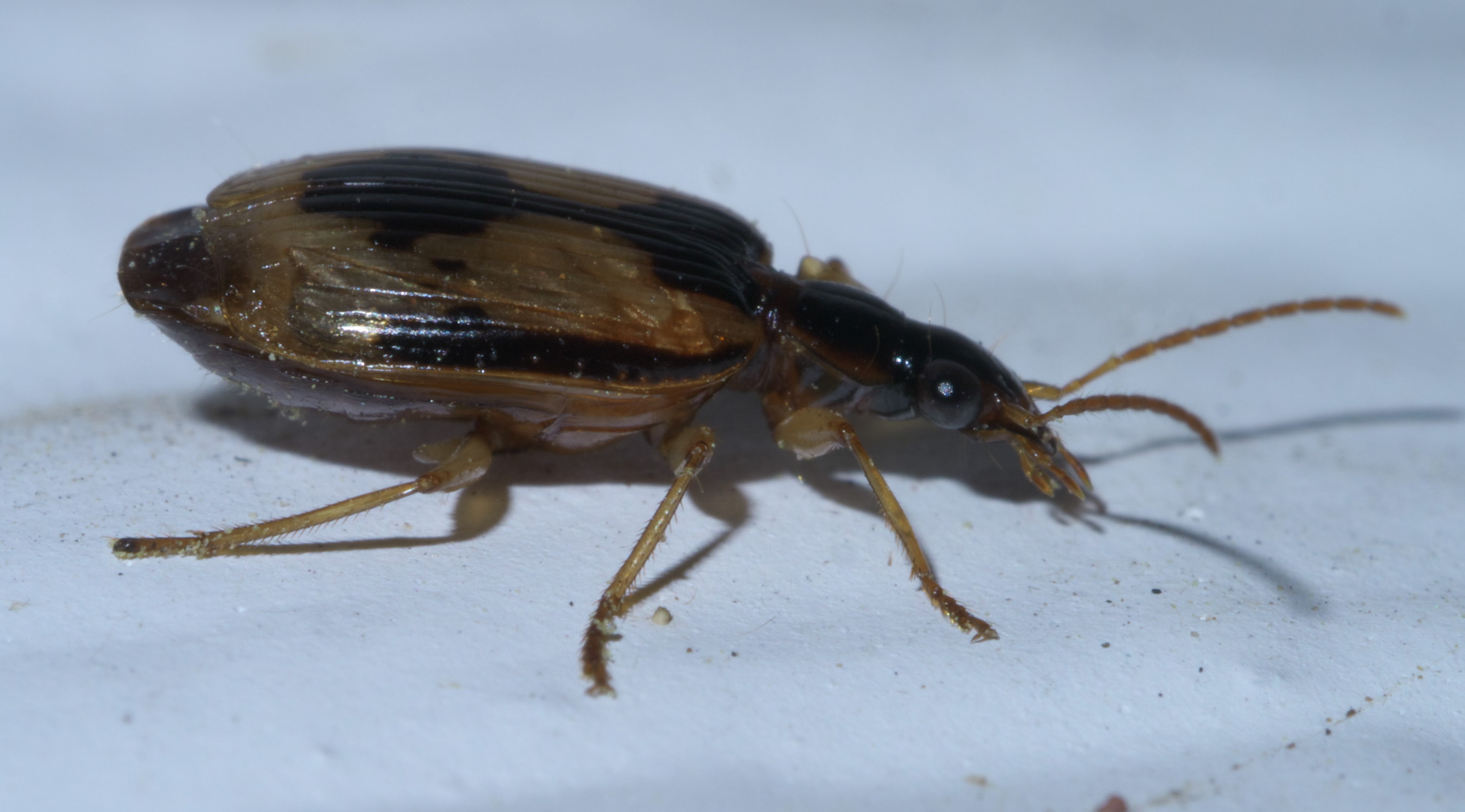
