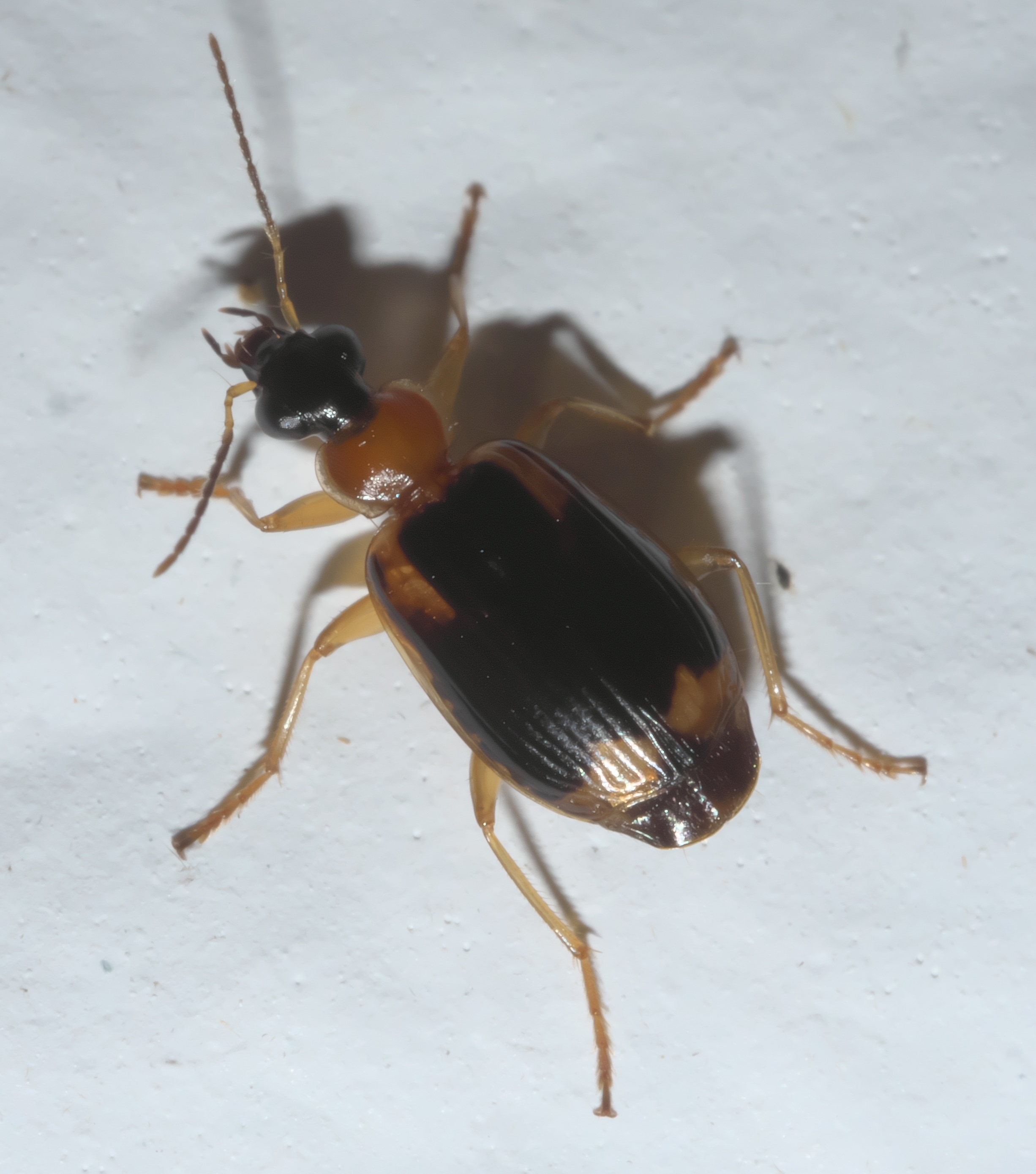

Scientific classification
- Kingdom: Animalia
- Phylum: Arthropoda
- Clade: Pancrustacea
- Class: Insecta
- Order: Coleoptera
- Suborder: Adephaga
- Family: Carabidae
- Genus: Lebia
- Species: L. analis

Binomial name
- Lebia analis Dejean, 1825

= Lebia analis =

Species of beetle

Lebia analis is a species of beetle in the family of Carabidae, Harpalinae subfamily.

== Description ==
Adult beetles are 1/3 of an inch long, in some cases: 4.5–5 millimetres (0.18–0.20 in). The elytron have pale apical marking which is interrupted by a fine black border along the suture. The pronotum in upper lateral region is striated. The color of it is brown and black. Sometimes they come in orangy-dark purple color.

== Distribution ==
The species is native to Canada.

== Ecology ==
The beetle eats foliage and flowers of various plants.
