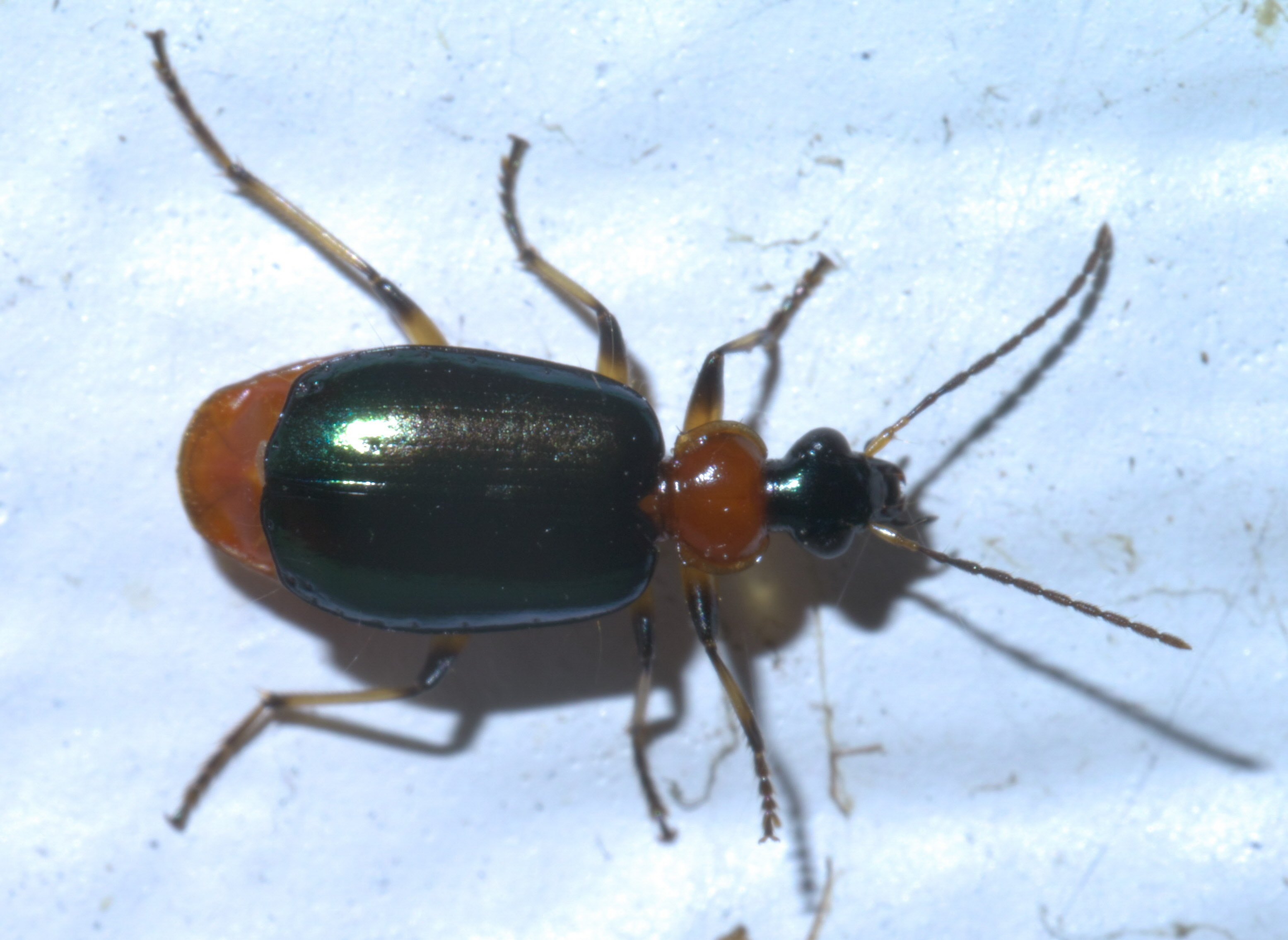

Scientific classification
- Kingdom: Animalia
- Phylum: Arthropoda
- Class: Insecta
- Order: Coleoptera
- Suborder: Adephaga
- Family: Carabidae
- Genus: Lebia
- Species: L. viridipennis

Binomial name
- Lebia viridipennis Dejean, 1826

= Lebia viridipennis =

Species of beetle

Lebia viridipennis, the green-winged lebia, is a species of ground beetle in the family Carabidae. It is found in North America.

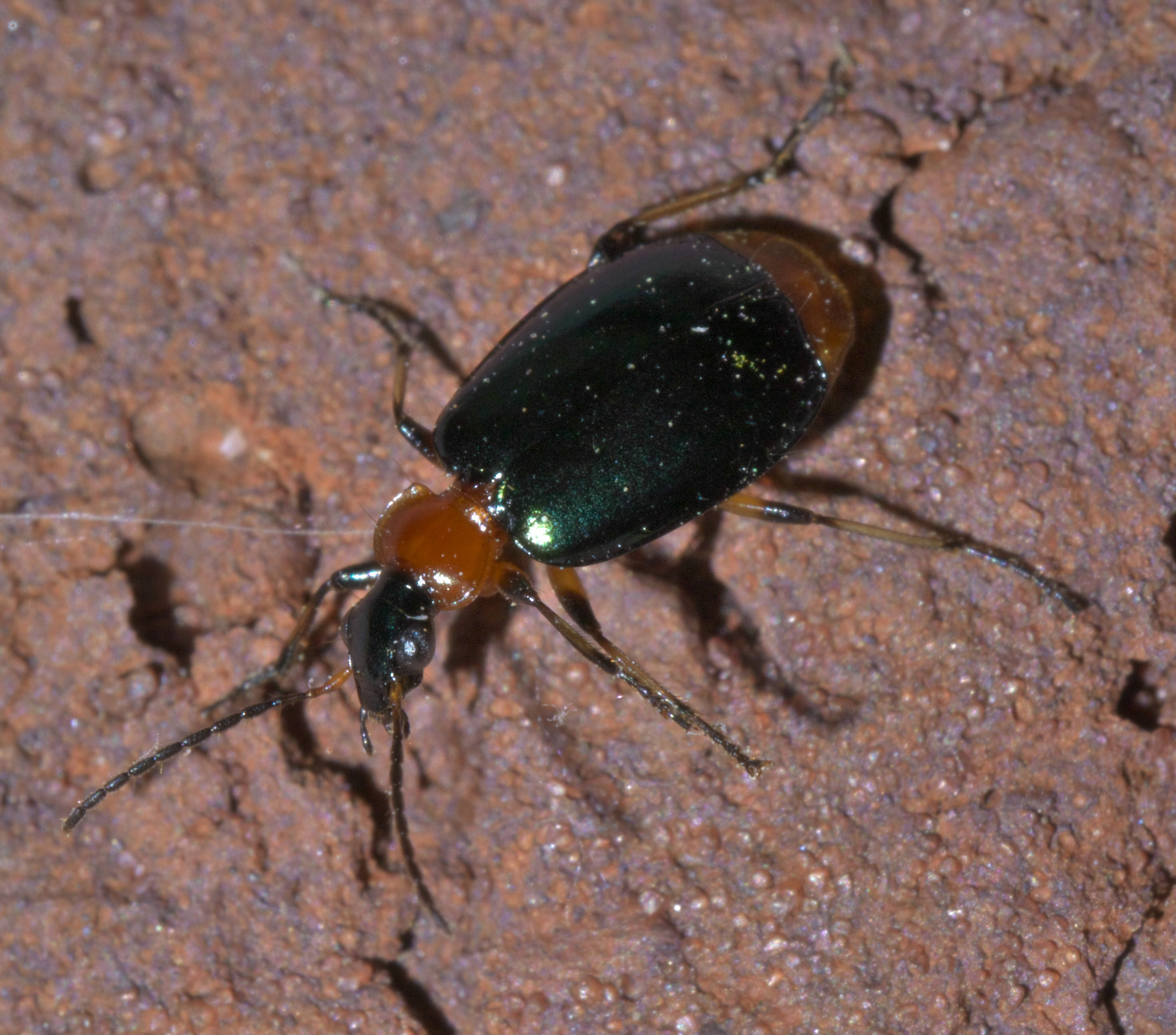
Green-winged lebia, Lebia viridipennis
