= Lebia maraniana =

Scientific classification
- Kingdom: Animalia
- Phylum: Arthropoda
- Class: Insecta
- Order: Coleoptera
- Suborder: Adephaga
- Family: Carabidae
- Genus: Lebia
- Species: L. maraniana

Binomial name
- Lebia maraniana Kult, 1943

Species of beetle

Lebia maraniana is a species of ground beetles in the Harpalinae subfamily that is endemic to Spain.
