= Lebia histrionica =

Scientific classification
- Domain: Eukaryota
- Kingdom: Animalia
- Phylum: Arthropoda
- Class: Insecta
- Order: Coleoptera
- Suborder: Adephaga
- Family: Carabidae
- Genus: Lebia
- Species: L. histrionica

Binomial name
- Lebia histrionica Bates, 1883

Species of beetle

Lebia histrionica is a species of beetle in the family Carabidae. The species is known from U.S. state of Arizona as well as Mexico and Guatemala.
