= Lebia abdominalis =

Scientific classification
- Domain: Eukaryota
- Kingdom: Animalia
- Phylum: Arthropoda
- Class: Insecta
- Order: Coleoptera
- Suborder: Adephaga
- Family: Carabidae
- Genus: Lebia
- Species: L. abdominalis

Binomial name
- Lebia abdominalis Chaudoir, 1843

Species of beetle

Lebia abdominalis is a species of beetle in the family Carabidae. It is found in Belize, Guatemala, Mexico, Nicaragua, on Jamaica and in the United States.
