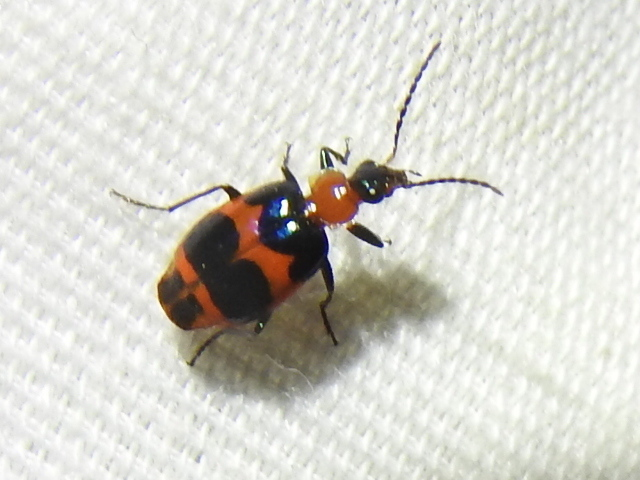

Scientific classification
- Kingdom: Animalia
- Phylum: Arthropoda
- Class: Insecta
- Order: Coleoptera
- Suborder: Adephaga
- Family: Carabidae
- Genus: Lebia
- Species: L. bitaeniata

Binomial name
- Lebia bitaeniata Chevrolat, 1834

= Lebia bitaeniata =

Species of beetle

Lebia bitaeniata is a species of ground beetle in the family Carabidae. It is found in North America.
