= Lebia festiva =

Scientific classification
- Domain: Eukaryota
- Kingdom: Animalia
- Phylum: Arthropoda
- Class: Insecta
- Order: Coleoptera
- Suborder: Adephaga
- Family: Carabidae
- Genus: Lebia
- Species: L. festiva

Binomial name
- Lebia festiva Faldermann, 1836

Species of beetle

Lebia festiva is a species of beetle in the family Carabidae.

== Description ==
The color of the body is dark purple, with orangy-blackish legs and antennas.

== Distribution ==
The species can be found in Khorasan Province, Gonobad, Iran.
