= Lebia turkestanica =

Scientific classification
- Domain: Eukaryota
- Kingdom: Animalia
- Phylum: Arthropoda
- Class: Insecta
- Order: Coleoptera
- Suborder: Adephaga
- Family: Carabidae
- Genus: Lebia
- Species: L. turkestanica

Binomial name
- Lebia turkestanica Jedlička, 1966

Species of beetle

Lebia turkestanica is a species of ground beetles in the Harpalinae subfamily that can be found in southern part of Russia and Ukraine.
