= Lebia collaris =

Scientific classification
- Kingdom: Animalia
- Phylum: Arthropoda
- Class: Insecta
- Order: Coleoptera
- Suborder: Adephaga
- Family: Carabidae
- Genus: Lebia
- Species: L. collaris

Binomial name
- Lebia collaris Dejean, 1826

Species of beetle

Lebia collaris is a species of beetle in the family Carabidae. It is found in the United States.
