= Lebia rufopleura =

Scientific classification
- Domain: Eukaryota
- Kingdom: Animalia
- Phylum: Arthropoda
- Class: Insecta
- Order: Coleoptera
- Suborder: Adephaga
- Family: Carabidae
- Genus: Lebia
- Species: L. rufopleura

Binomial name
- Lebia rufopleura Schaeffer, 1910

Species of beetle

Lebia rufopleura is a species of ground beetle in the family Carabidae. It is found in North America.
