= Lebia atriceps =

Scientific classification
- Domain: Eukaryota
- Kingdom: Animalia
- Phylum: Arthropoda
- Class: Insecta
- Order: Coleoptera
- Suborder: Adephaga
- Family: Carabidae
- Genus: Lebia
- Species: L. atriceps

Binomial name
- Lebia atriceps LeConte, 1863

Species of beetle

Lebia atriceps is a species of ground beetle in the family Carabidae. It is found in North America (Canada, Mexico and the United States)
