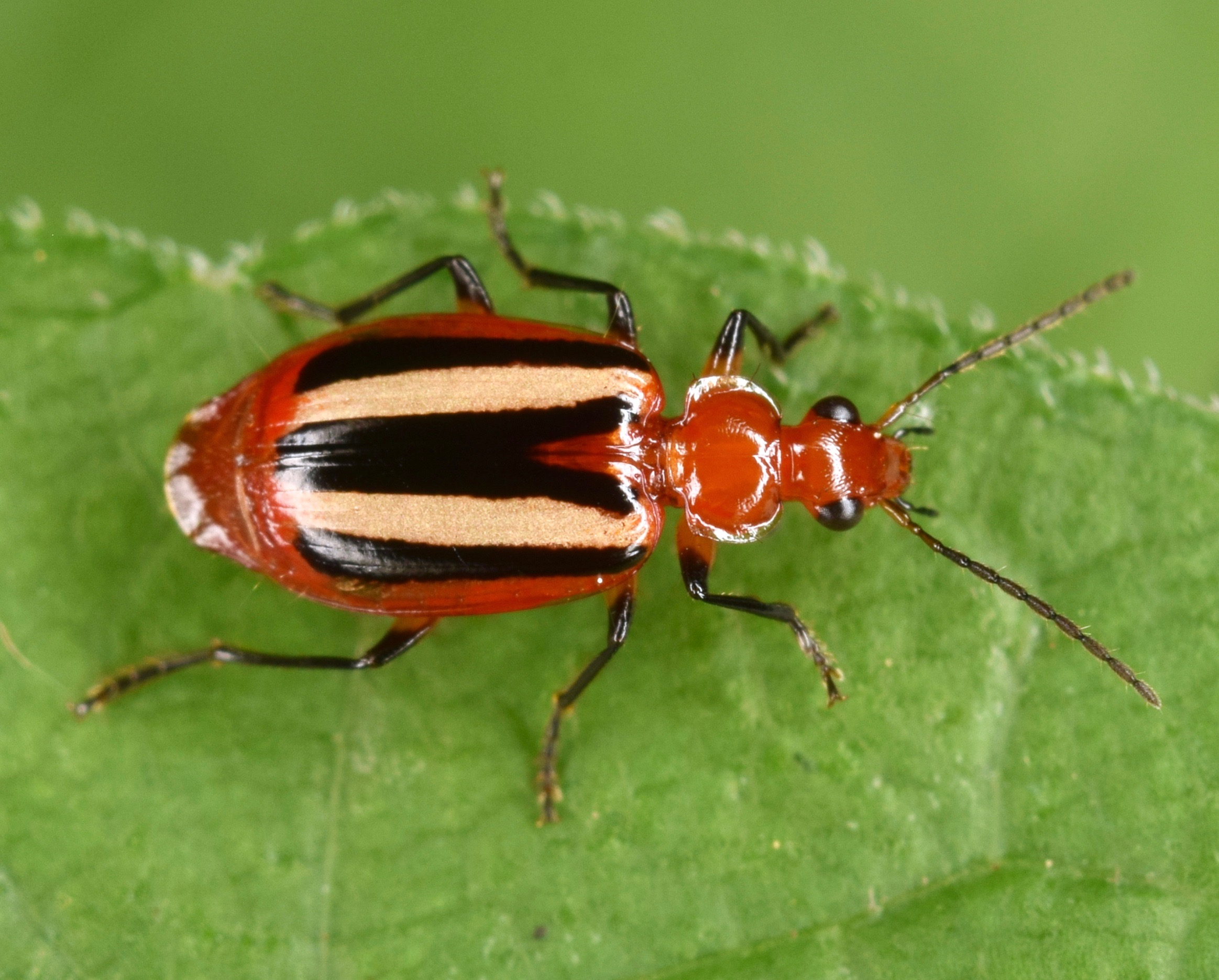

Scientific classification
- Kingdom: Animalia
- Phylum: Arthropoda
- Clade: Pancrustacea
- Class: Insecta
- Order: Coleoptera
- Suborder: Adephaga
- Family: Carabidae
- Genus: Lebia
- Species: L. vittata

Binomial name
- Lebia vittata (Fabricius, 1777)

= Lebia vittata =

Species of beetle

Lebia vittata is a species of ground beetle in the family Carabidae. It is found in North America.
