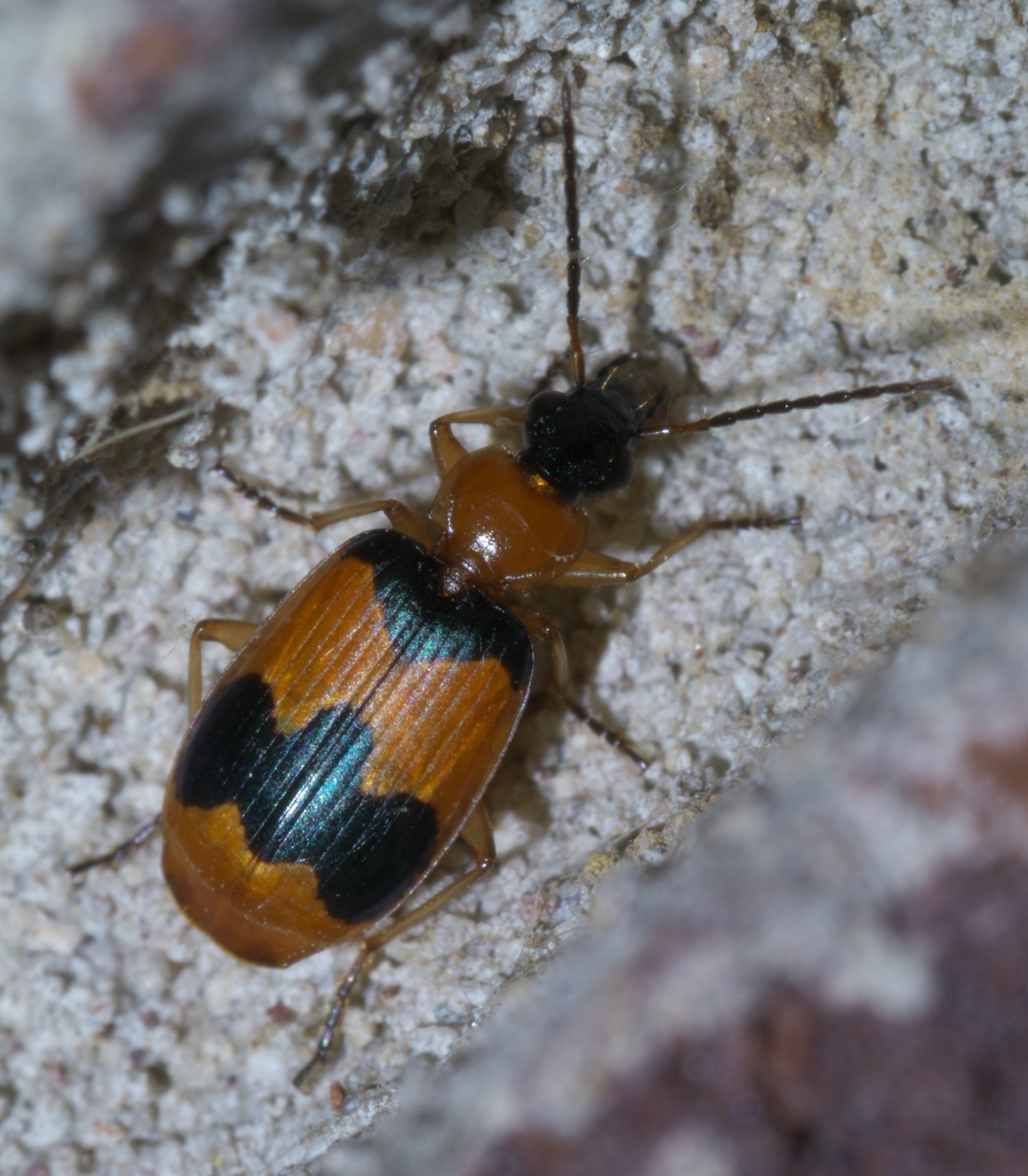

Scientific classification
- Domain: Eukaryota
- Kingdom: Animalia
- Phylum: Arthropoda
- Class: Insecta
- Order: Coleoptera
- Suborder: Adephaga
- Family: Carabidae
- Genus: Lebia
- Species: L. pulchella

Binomial name
- Lebia pulchella Dejean, 1826

= Lebia pulchella =

Species of beetle

Lebia pulchella, the beautiful banded lebium, is a species of beetle in the family Carabidae. It is found from southern Canada to southern Texas.

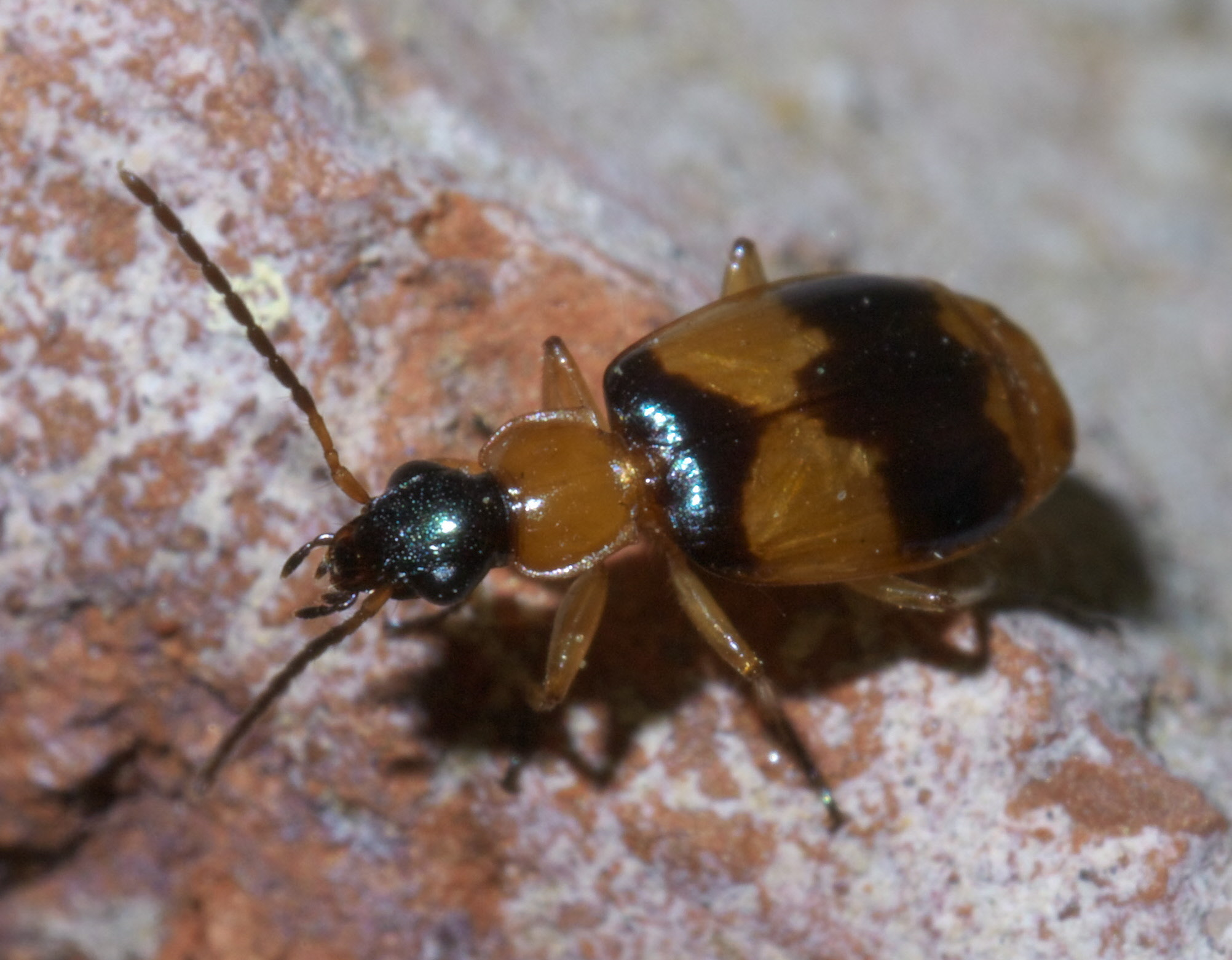
Beautiful banded lebia, Lebia pulchella
