= Lebia calliope =

Scientific classification
- Domain: Eukaryota
- Kingdom: Animalia
- Phylum: Arthropoda
- Class: Insecta
- Order: Coleoptera
- Suborder: Adephaga
- Family: Carabidae
- Genus: Lebia
- Species: L. calliope

Binomial name
- Lebia calliope Bates, 1883

Species of beetle

Lebia calliope is a species of beetle in the family Carabidae. It is found in Guatemala, Mexico and the U.S. state of Texas.
