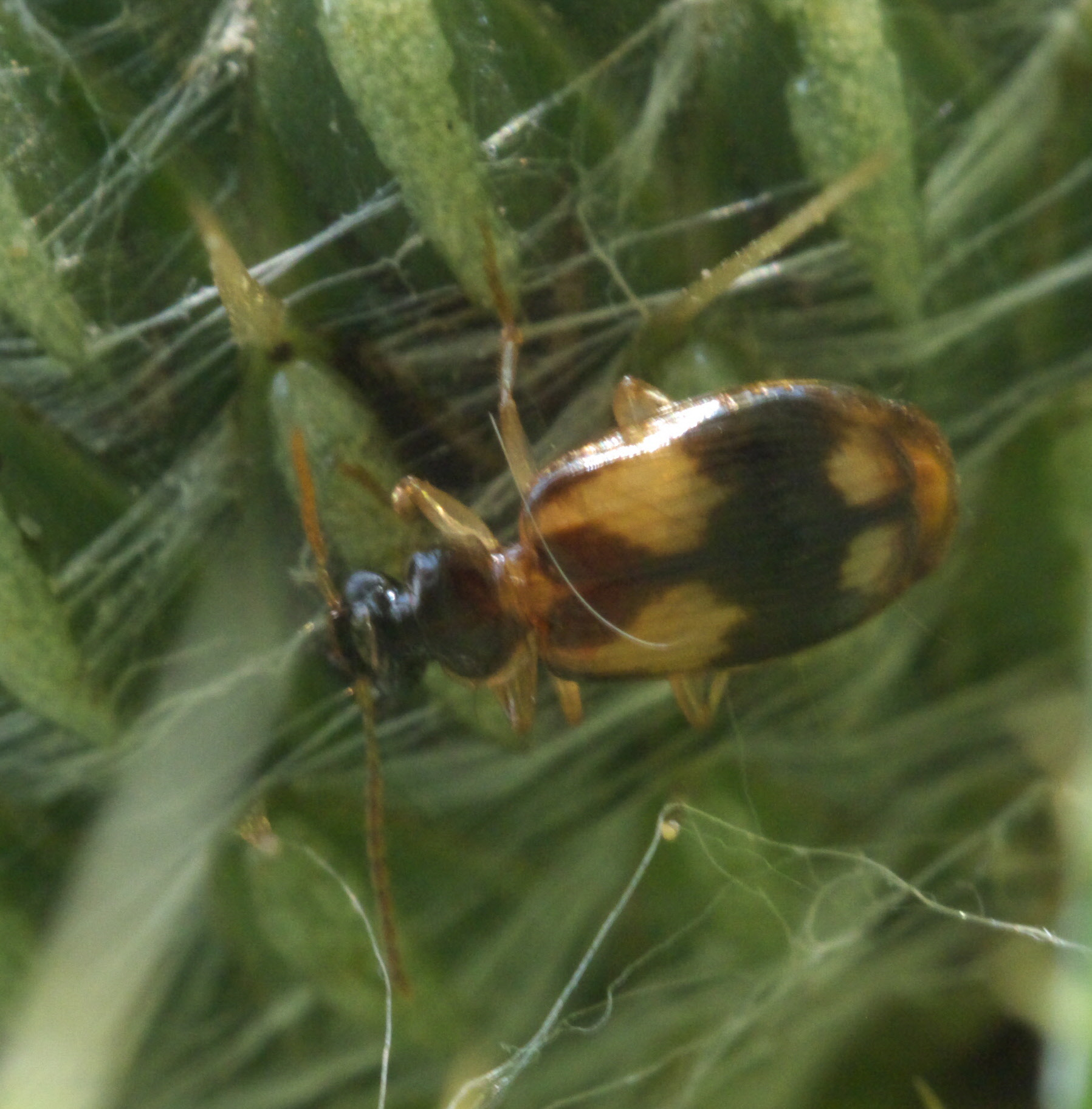

Scientific classification
- Domain: Eukaryota
- Kingdom: Animalia
- Phylum: Arthropoda
- Class: Insecta
- Order: Coleoptera
- Suborder: Adephaga
- Family: Carabidae
- Genus: Lebia
- Species: L. ornata

Binomial name
- Lebia ornata Say, 1823

= Lebia ornata =

Species of beetle

Lebia ornata is a species of ground beetle in the genus Lebia ("colorful foliage ground beetles"), in the family Carabidae ("ground beetles"). It was described by American entomologist Thomas Say in 1823.

It is found in a broad range across eastern North America, from Texas to South Dakota, east Nova Scotia, and south to Florida.
