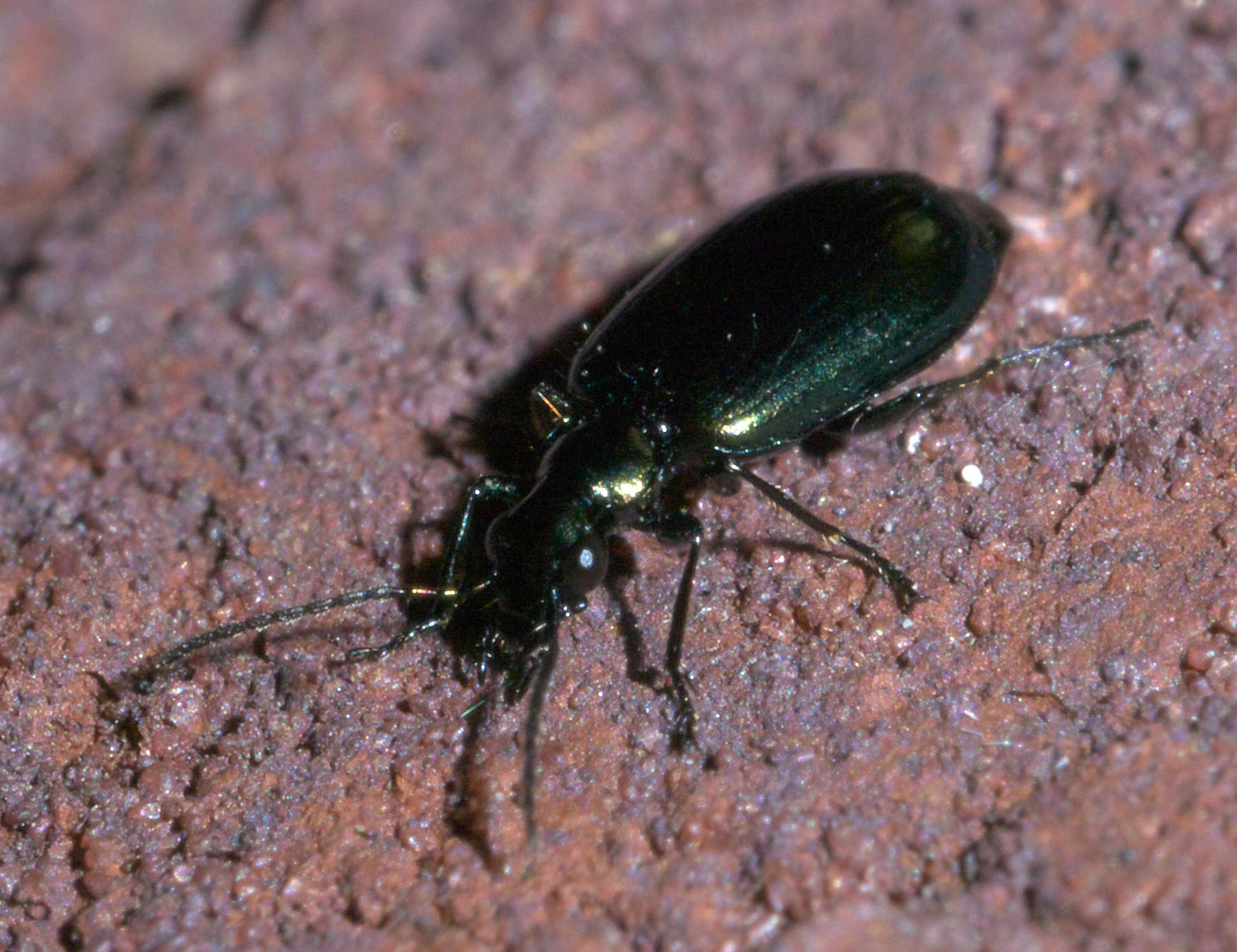

Scientific classification
- Kingdom: Animalia
- Phylum: Arthropoda
- Clade: Pancrustacea
- Class: Insecta
- Order: Coleoptera
- Suborder: Adephaga
- Family: Carabidae
- Genus: Lebia
- Species: L. viridis

Binomial name
- Lebia viridis Say, 1823

= Lebia viridis =

Species of beetle

Lebia viridis is a species of predatory ground beetle in the family Carabidae. It is found in North America, Guatemala, Mexico and on Cuba. It measure 5 to 7 mm. Diurnal; can sometimes be very common on flowers and vegetation.

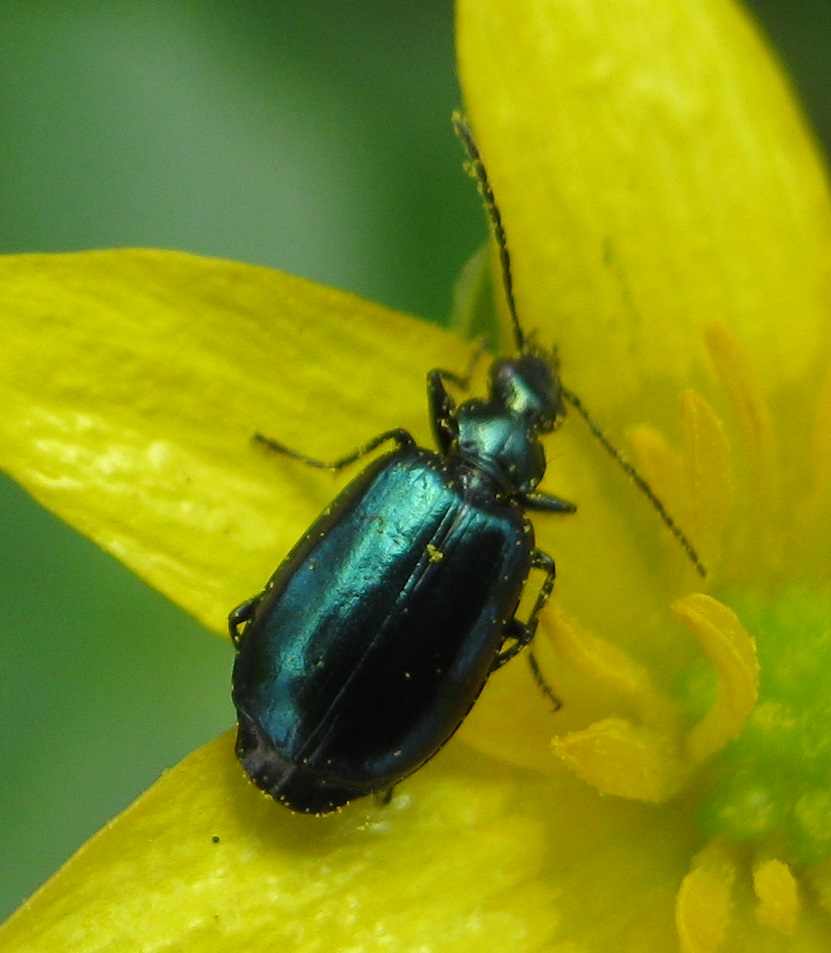
In Pennsylvania, USA.

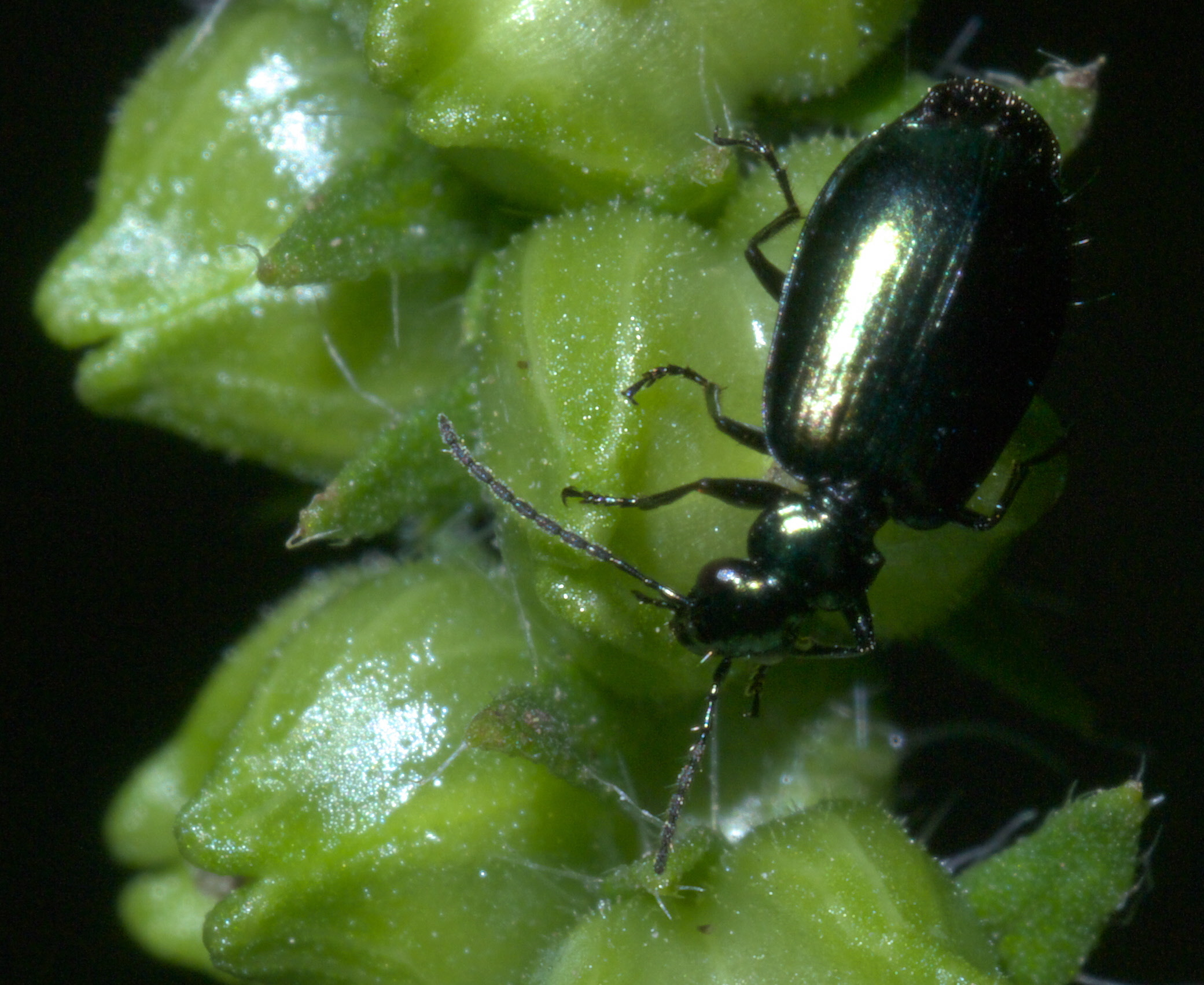
Lebia viridis, Pryor, OK, USA
