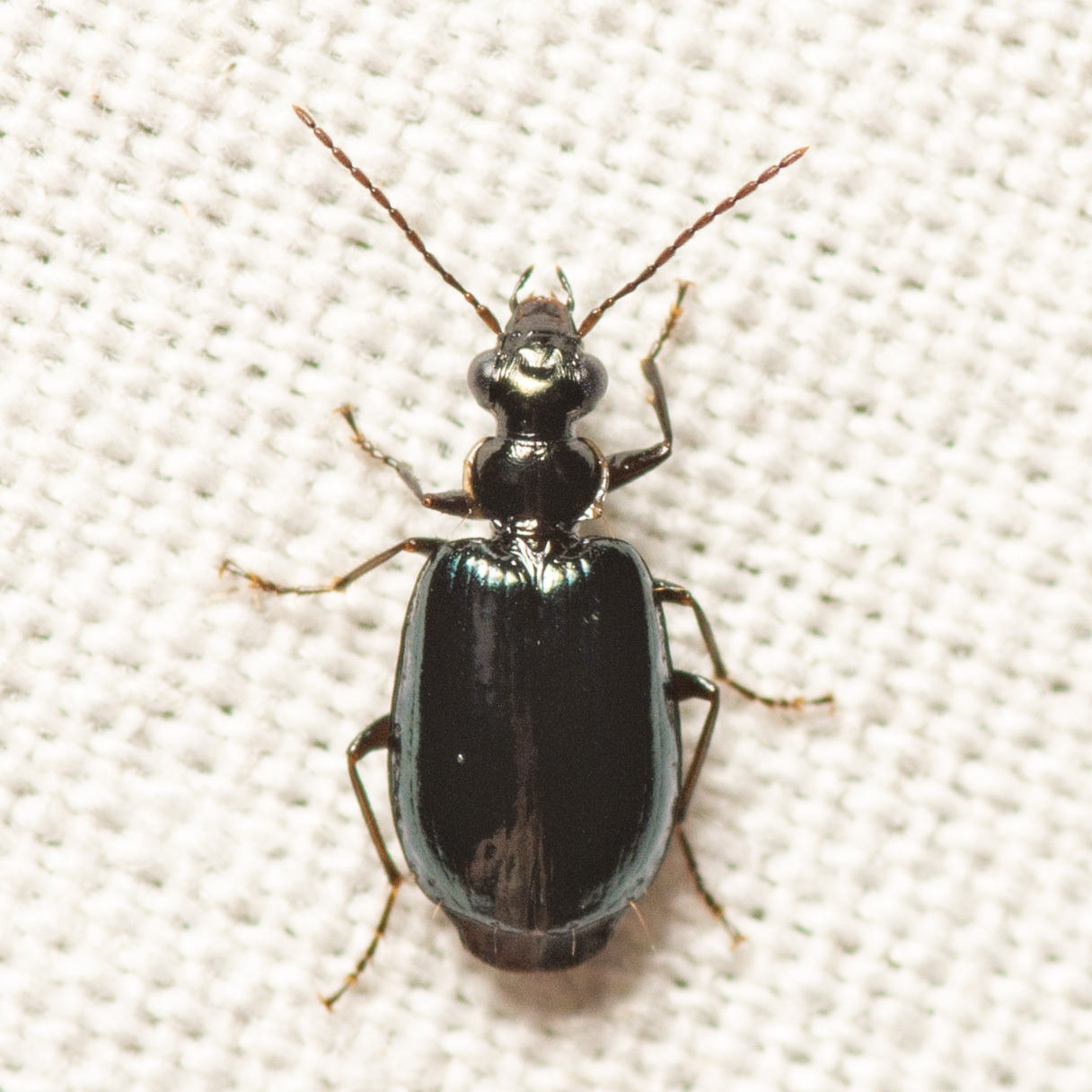
- Lebia marginicollis, Texas

Scientific classification
- Kingdom: Animalia
- Phylum: Arthropoda
- Class: Insecta
- Order: Coleoptera
- Suborder: Adephaga
- Family: Carabidae
- Genus: Lebia
- Species: L. marginicollis

Binomial name
- Lebia marginicollis Dejean, 1825

= Lebia marginicollis =

Species of beetle

Lebia marginicollis is a species of ground beetle in the family Carabidae. It is found in North America.
