= Lebia bilineata =

Scientific classification
- Domain: Eukaryota
- Kingdom: Animalia
- Phylum: Arthropoda
- Class: Insecta
- Order: Coleoptera
- Suborder: Adephaga
- Family: Carabidae
- Genus: Lebia
- Species: L. bilineata

Binomial name
- Lebia bilineata Motschulsky, 1859

Species of beetle

Lebia bilineata is a species of beetle in the family Carabidae. It is found in Mexico and the United States.
