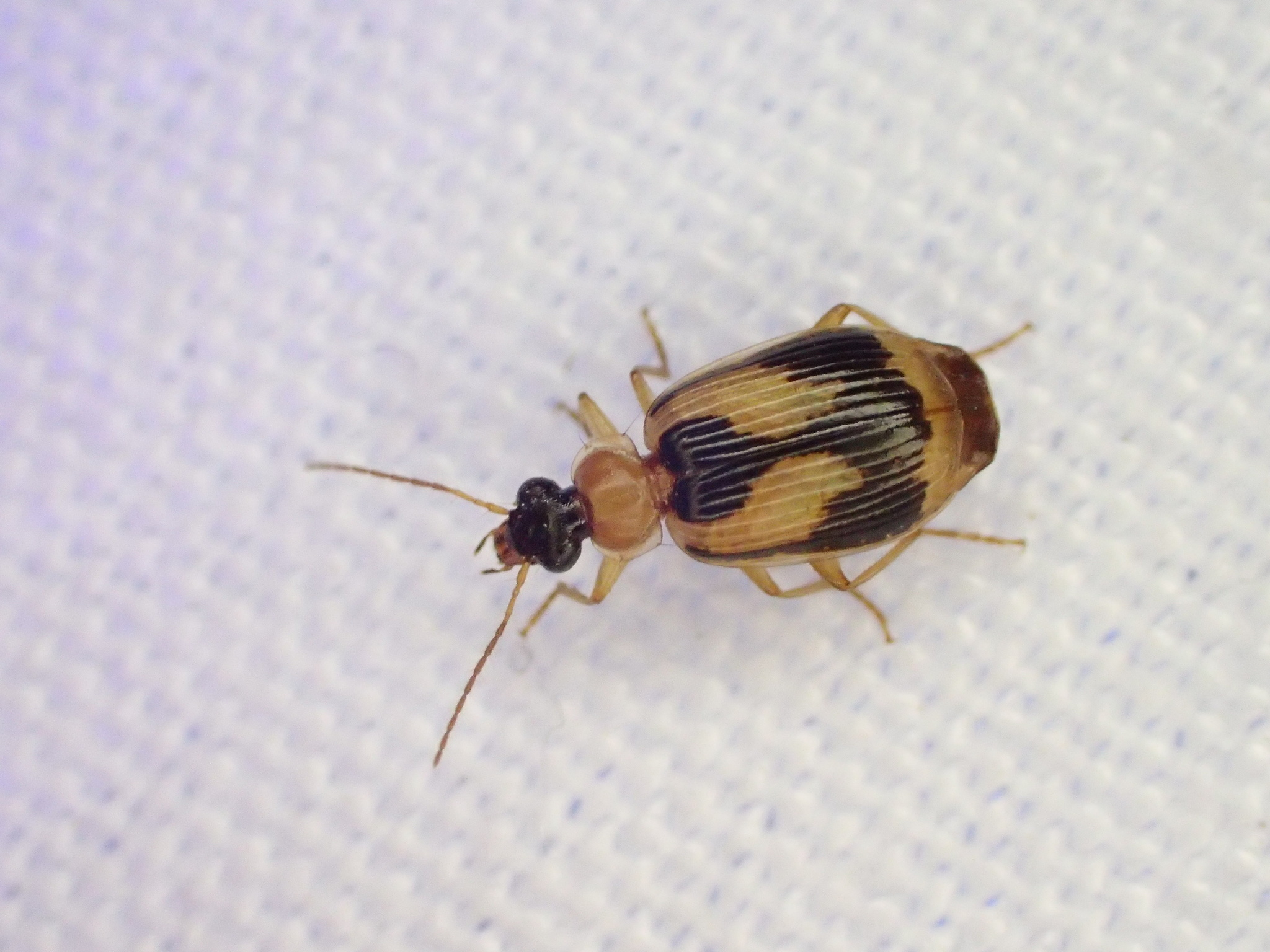

Scientific classification
- Kingdom: Animalia
- Phylum: Arthropoda
- Clade: Pancrustacea
- Class: Insecta
- Order: Coleoptera
- Suborder: Adephaga
- Family: Carabidae
- Genus: Lebia
- Species: L. scalpta

Binomial name
- Lebia scalpta Bates, 1883

= Lebia scalpta =

Species of beetle

Lebia scalpta is a species of ground beetle in the family Carabidae. It is found in Central America and North America.
