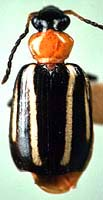

Scientific classification
- Domain: Eukaryota
- Kingdom: Animalia
- Phylum: Arthropoda
- Class: Insecta
- Order: Coleoptera
- Suborder: Adephaga
- Family: Carabidae
- Genus: Lebia
- Species: L. bivittata

Binomial name
- Lebia bivittata (Fabricius, 1798)

Synonyms
- Carabus vittatus Fabricius, 1798; Lebia quadrivittata Dejean, 1825; Dianchomena aemula Casey, 1920; Dianchomena devincta Casey, 1920

= Lebia bivittata =

Species of beetle

Lebia bivittata is a species of beetle in the family Carabidae. It is found in Mexico and the United States.
