= Lebia pimalis =

Scientific classification
- Kingdom: Animalia
- Phylum: Arthropoda
- Class: Insecta
- Order: Coleoptera
- Suborder: Adephaga
- Family: Carabidae
- Genus: Lebia
- Species: L. pimalis

Binomial name
- Lebia pimalis (Casey, 1920)

Synonyms
- Lecalida pimalis Casey, 1920

Species of beetle

Lebia pimalis is a species of ground beetle in the family Carabidae. It is found in North America.
