= Lebia trimaculata =

Scientific classification
- Kingdom: Animalia
- Phylum: Arthropoda
- Clade: Pancrustacea
- Class: Insecta
- Order: Coleoptera
- Suborder: Adephaga
- Family: Carabidae
- Genus: Lebia
- Species: L. trimaculata

Binomial name
- Lebia trimaculata (Villers, 1789)

Species of beetle

Lebia trimaculata is a species of ground beetles in the Harpalinae subfamily that can be found in Austria, Bulgaria, Croatia, Cyprus, France, Greece, Hungary, Italy (including Corsica and Sicily), Moldova, North Macedonia, Portugal, Romania, Russia, Slovakia, Switzerland, and Ukraine.
