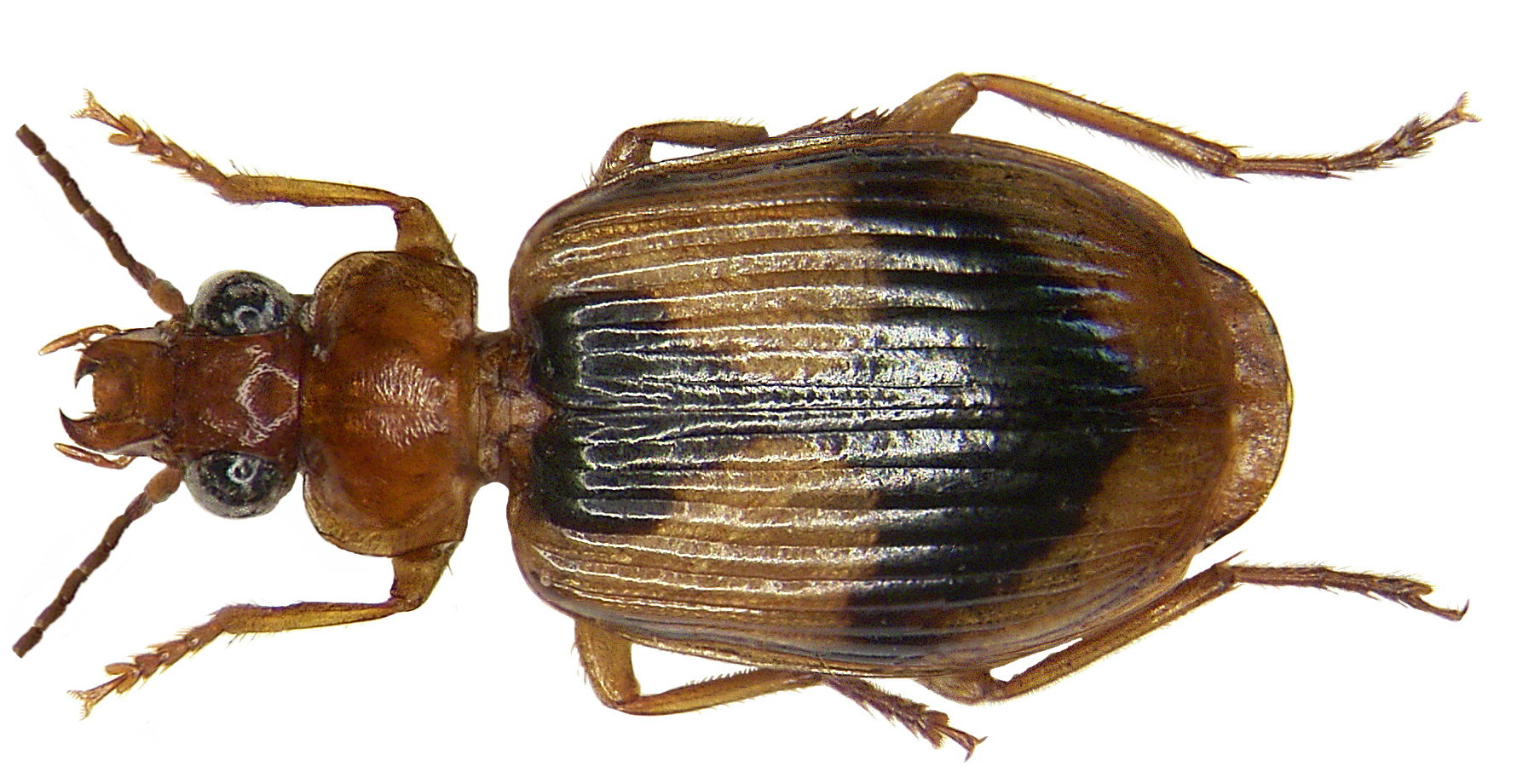
- Lebia darlingtoniana

Scientific classification
- Kingdom: Animalia
- Phylum: Arthropoda
- Clade: Pancrustacea
- Class: Insecta
- Order: Coleoptera
- Suborder: Adephaga
- Family: Carabidae
- Tribe: Lebiini
- Genus: Lebia; Latreille, 1802

Synonyms
- Loxopeza Chaudoir, 1870; Metabola Chaudoir, 1871; Dianchomena Chaudoir, 1871; Aphelogenia Chaudoir, 1871

= Lebia =

Genus of beetles

Lebia is a genus of predatory ground beetles. Common names include colorful foliage ground beetles and flat ground beetles. They are found worldwide and there over 700 species in 17 subgenera.

== Description ==
Small or medium-sized beetles, often iridescent or vividly coloured with wide, flattened elytra. They are often found on foliage and flowers. They eat small insects and some species are parasitic on leaf beetle larvae.

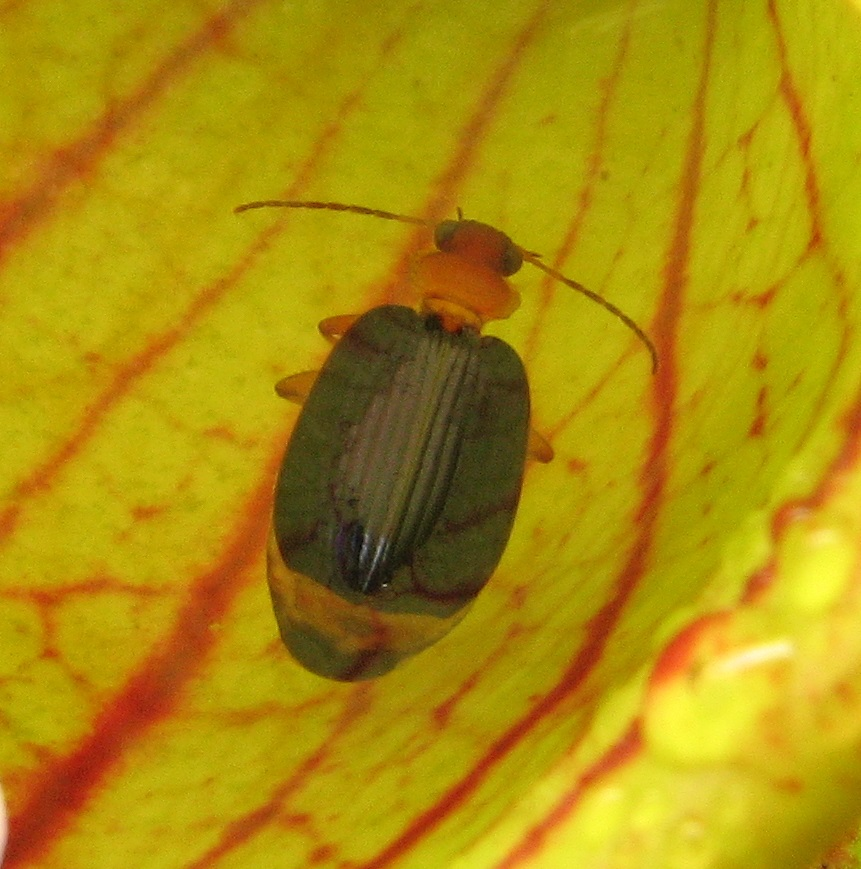
Lebia grandis trapped in pitcher plant

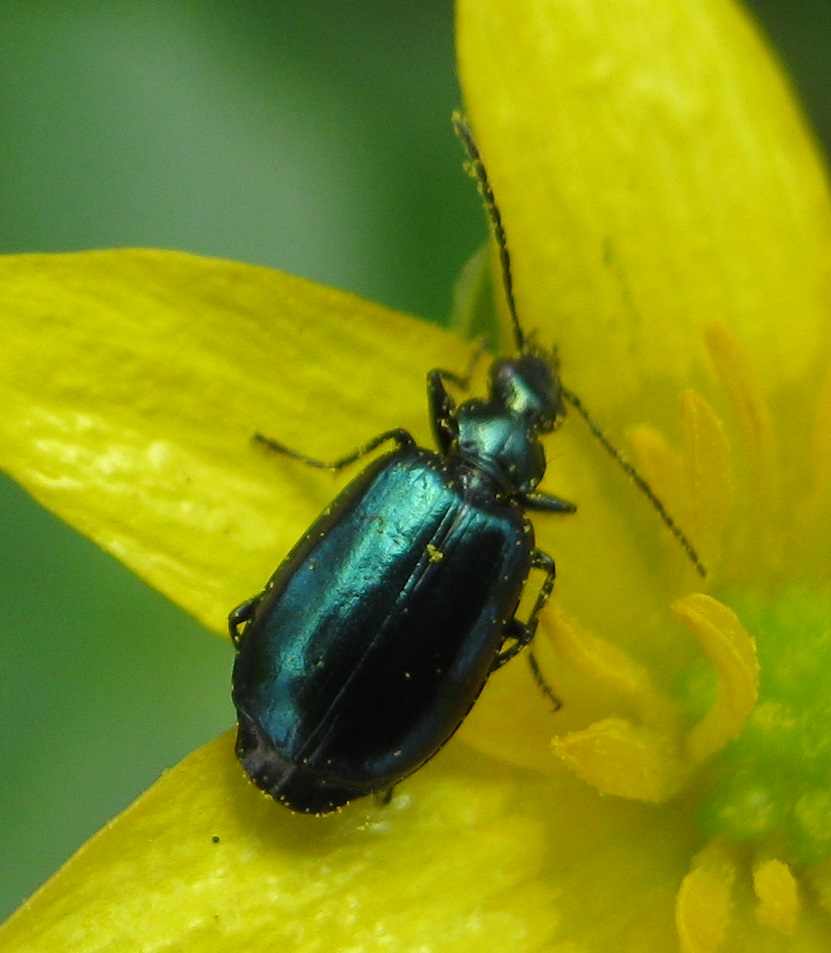
Lebia viridis on lesser celandine

Lebia tricolor, genus Legia, in the family of ground beetles, searching for prey.

== Species ==
These 791 species belong to the genus Lebia.

Subgenus Chelonodema Laporte, 1834

Lebia albosinuata (Putzeys, 1845)
Lebia albovariegata (Chaudoir, 1871)
Lebia azteca Reichardt, 1972
Lebia balli Reichardt, 1972
Lebia baturitea Reichardt, 1972
Lebia birai Reichardt, 1972
Lebia boliviensis (Chaudoir, 1871)
Lebia caligula (Reichardt, 1971)
Lebia championi (Bates, 1883)
Lebia clavata (Liebke, 1929)
Lebia cyclopica Reichardt, 1972
Lebia decemmaculata (Chaudoir, 1871)
Lebia duodecimpunctata Dejean, 1831
Lebia erotyloides Reichardt, 1972
Lebia fasciata (Sturm, 1843)
Lebia howdeni Reichardt, 1972
Lebia inbio Erwin, 2000
Lebia macromaculata Mateu, 1994
Lebia mathani Reichardt, 1972
Lebia melanocrepis (Bates, 1883)
Lebia mocoronga Reichardt, 1972
Lebia nigromarginata (Chaudoir, 1871)
Lebia nigropicta Chaudoir, 1872
Lebia novemmaculata (Liebke, 1928)
Lebia ocelligera (Bates, 1883)
Lebia omophoita Reichardt, 1972
Lebia passoura Reichardt, 1972
Lebia piresa (Liebke, 1935)
Lebia pujoli Reichardt, 1972
Lebia quadriannulata (Bates, 1878)
Lebia quadrinotata Chevrolat, 1835
Lebia quipapa Reichardt, 1972
Lebia sagarana Reichardt, 1972
Lebia scripta (Laporte, 1834)
Lebia signatipennis Perty, 1830
Lebia testacea Dejean, 1831
Lebia thomsoni (Chaudoir, 1871)
Lebia toroana (Liebke, 1951)
Lebia trifasciata (Chaudoir, 1871)
Lebia variabilis (Laporte, 1834)
Lebia ytu Reichardt, 1972

Subgenus Cymatographa Chaudoir, 1871
Lebia undulata Dejean, 1831
Subgenus Glyciolebia Kryzhanovskij, 1987
Lebia arcuata Reiche & Saulcy, 1855
Subgenus Grammica Chaudoir, 1871
Lebia hexasticta (Liebke, 1935)
Lebia pictipennis (Chaudoir, 1871)
Lebia scutellata Putzeys, 1845
Subgenus Lamprias Bonelli, 1810

Lebia chlorocephala (J.J.Hoffmann, 1803)
Lebia chrysis Reitter, 1892
Lebia coelestis Bates, 1888
Lebia cyanocephala (Linnaeus, 1758)
Lebia divisa LeConte, 1850
Lebia festiva Faldermann, 1836
Lebia fulvicollis (Fabricius, 1792)
Lebia irakensis Jedlicka, 1963
Lebia lucilla Reitter, 1898
Lebia meghalayaensis Kirschenhofer, 2012
Lebia pubipennis L.Dufour, 1820
Lebia punctata Gebler, 1843
Lebia rufipes Dejean, 1825
Lebia rutilicollis Reitter, 1915
Lebia viridana Reitter, 1898

Subgenus Lebia Latreille, 1802

Lebia abdita Madge, 1967
Lebia abdominalis Chaudoir, 1843
Lebia acutangula Jordan, 1894
Lebia adamantina Péringuey, 1896
Lebia adusta Baehr, 2004
Lebia aegra Chaudoir, 1871
Lebia aethiopica Chaudoir, 1876
Lebia agnata Chaudoir, 1871
Lebia albidipennis Chaudoir, 1878
Lebia allardi Basilewsky, 1963
Lebia amabilicolor Lorenz, 1998
Lebia amabilis (Chaudoir, 1871)
Lebia amoenula (Chaudoir, 1871)
Lebia analis Dejean, 1825
Lebia anchorago Chaudoir, 1871
Lebia anchoralis Basilewsky, 1949
Lebia anchorifera (Chaudoir, 1871)
Lebia andina Liebke, 1939
Lebia andrewesi Jedlicka, 1933
Lebia angolana Basilewsky, 1949
Lebia angulata Dejean, 1831
Lebia angusticollis Putzeys, 1845
Lebia annuligera Chaudoir, 1871
Lebia annulipennis Putzeys, 1845
Lebia apicalis Chevrolat, 1834
Lebia apicefusca Barker, 1922
Lebia argutula (Chaudoir, 1871)
Lebia arietis Bates, 1883
Lebia arisana Jedlicka, 1951
Lebia arizonica Schaeffer, 1910
Lebia armata Liebke, 1935
Lebia arrowi Jedlicka, 1934
Lebia ascendens Chaudoir, 1871
Lebia asterisca Chaudoir, 1871
Lebia atricapillus Liebke, 1931
Lebia atripennis Baehr, 2004
Lebia australica Baehr, 2004
Lebia aviatica Liebke, 1935
Lebia azurea Solier, 1849
Lebia badakschana Jedlicka, 1956
Lebia balteata Heyden, 1886
Lebia barda Darlington, 1968
Lebia basiguttata Motschulsky, 1864
Lebia bella Andrewes, 1938
Lebia biannulata Chaudoir, 1871
Lebia bicolor (Sloane, 1907)
Lebia bicurvata Liebke, 1938
Lebia bifasciata Dejean, 1825
Lebia biforis Bates, 1883
Lebia bifossifrons Basilewsky, 1962
Lebia bilineata Motschulsky, 1859
Lebia binotata Buquet, 1835
Lebia bioculata Boheman, 1858
Lebia biplagiatella Csiki, 1932
Lebia bipunctata Chevrolat, 1835
Lebia bitaeniata Chevrolat, 1834
Lebia bivittata (Fabricius, 1798)
Lebia bivitticollis Bates, 1883
Lebia bivulnerata Motschulsky, 1864
Lebia boliviana Liebke, 1938
Lebia boysii Chaudoir, 1850
Lebia brachinoides Reiche, 1842
Lebia breuningi Basilewsky, 1948
Lebia brevilimbata Pic, 1922
Lebia brisbanensis Baehr, 2004
Lebia bruchi Liebke, 1936
Lebia bumeliae Schaeffer, 1910
Lebia c-nigrum Putzeys, 1845
Lebia caerulea Buquet, 1835
Lebia callanga Liebke, 1935
Lebia callida Liebke, 1938
Lebia calliope Bates, 1883
Lebia calliparis Bates, 1883
Lebia callitrema Bates, 1889
Lebia campania Andrewes, 1933
Lebia cannae Steinheil, 1875
Lebia cardoni Bates, 1892
Lebia centromaculata Putzeys, 1845
Lebia chacoensis Liebke, 1935
Lebia chalcoma Andrewes, 1947
Lebia chalcoptera Chaudoir, 1871
Lebia chalybeipennis R.F.Sahlberg, 1847
Lebia chalybe Bates, 1883
Lebia charilla Bates, 1883
Lebia charina Bates, 1878
Lebia charisma Liebke, 1938
Lebia chelostigma Bates, 1883
Lebia chinensis Boheman, 1858
Lebia chiponica Jedlicka, 1939
Lebia chiriquensis Bates, 1883
Lebia chlorotica Dejean, 1831
Lebia chopimana Liebke, 1938
Lebia chrysomyia Bates, 1888
Lebia chyulana Basilewsky, 1948
Lebia clarissa Andrewes, 1929
Lebia clio Bates, 1883
Lebia coeca Gory, 1833
Lebia coelina Bates, 1883
Lebia cognata Chaudoir, 1871
Lebia collaris Dejean, 1826
Lebia colmanti Burgeon, 1937
Lebia concinna Brullé, 1838
Lebia confusa Chaudoir, 1871
Lebia confusula Chaudoir, 1871
Lebia congoana Burgeon, 1937
Lebia congrua Péringuey, 1896
Lebia congruens Péringuey, 1898
Lebia conjugata Motschulsky, 1864
Lebia consularis Chaudoir, 1871
Lebia contaminata Mannerheim, 1837
Lebia contigua Chaudoir, 1871
Lebia coptoderina Bates, 1883
Lebia coptoderopsis Burgeon, 1937
Lebia corcula Bates, 1878
Lebia cordelia Bates, 1883
Lebia cordifer Darlington, 1968
Lebia coronata Liebke, 1938
Lebia costaricensis Liebke, 1935
Lebia crinalis Liebke, 1939
Lebia croceicollis Bates, 1883
Lebia cruciata Landin, 1955
Lebia crucifera Boheman, 1860
Lebia cruciferella Kuntzen, 1919
Lebia cruralis Basilewsky, 1948
Lebia cruxminor (Linnaeus, 1758)
Lebia cumanensis Putzeys, 1845
Lebia cuonaensis Yu, 1981
Lebia cupripennis Chaudoir, 1850
Lebia cursor Chaudoir, 1871
Lebia curvipicta Liebke, 1935
Lebia cyanipennis Dejean, 1831
Lebia cyanytheana Basilewsky, 1968
Lebia cymindoides Bates, 1883
Lebia daguerrei Liebke, 1939
Lebia darlingtoni Louwerens, 1953
Lebia darlingtoniana Baehr, 2004
Lebia debilis Péringuey, 1896
Lebia decellei Basilewsky, 1968
Lebia declivis Liebke, 1934
Lebia decolor (Bates, 1883)
Lebia delineata Brullé, 1838
Lebia dentata Chaudoir, 1871
Lebia denticulata Chaudoir, 1871
Lebia dentipicta Liebke, 1938
Lebia desaegeri Basilewsky, 1962
Lebia dichroma Andrewes, 1923
Lebia diehli Liebke, 1951
Lebia discernenda Chaudoir, 1871
Lebia disconotata (Chaudoir, 1871)
Lebia discopicta (Chaudoir, 1871)
Lebia discrepans Péringuey, 1898
Lebia distigma Liebke, 1934
Lebia distinguenda Putzeys, 1846
Lebia ditissima Bates, 1883
Lebia dorsalis Dejean, 1826
Lebia dorsovittata Zayas, 1988
Lebia dubia Péringuey, 1896
Lebia dugesi Bates, 1883
Lebia duillia Bates, 1883
Lebia durbanensis Barker, 1922
Lebia eberti Jedlicka, 1965
Lebia edentata Baehr, 2007
Lebia edithae Reitter, 1914
Lebia elegans Gory, 1833
Lebia elegantissima Lutshnik, 1922
Lebia elegantula (Chaudoir, 1871)
Lebia elimata Liebke, 1939
Lebia emblemata Liebke, 1938
Lebia emendata Liebke, 1939
Lebia endynomena Darlington, 1968
Lebia ephippiata Andrewes, 1933
Lebia epigramma Liebke, 1938
Lebia epiphaea Chaudoir, 1871
Lebia erythreensis Basilewsky, 1947
Lebia estebana Liebke, 1935
Lebia esurialis Casey, 1920
Lebia exarata (Kirsch, 1873)
Lebia exigua Kirsch, 1873
Lebia exilis Andrewes, 1947
Lebia eximia Péringuey, 1896
Lebia exsanguis Bates, 1886
Lebia externa Darlington, 1968
Lebia extrema Bates, 1883
Lebia eylandti Baehr, 2012
Lebia fabriziobattonii Kirschenhofer, 1986
Lebia fallaciosa Baehr, 2004
Lebia fasciola (Fabricius, 1801)
Lebia fatua Liebke, 1938
Lebia fenestrata (Chaudoir, 1871)
Lebia festinans Liebke, 1935
Lebia figurata (Chaudoir, 1871)
Lebia fimbriolata Bates, 1883
Lebia flammea Bates, 1883
Lebia flavipes Chaudoir, 1871
Lebia flavofasciata Brullé, 1838
Lebia flavoguttata Chaudoir, 1871
Lebia flavopicta Liebke, 1938
Lebia flohri Bates, 1883
Lebia focki Kuntzen, 1919
Lebia formosana Jedlicka, 1946
Lebia foveipennis Baehr, 2004
Lebia frenata (Chaudoir, 1871)
Lebia freudei Jedlicka, 1966
Lebia fruhstorferi Liebke, 1938
Lebia fukiensis Jedlicka, 1953
Lebia furcatula Liebke, 1934
Lebia fuscata Dejean, 1825
Lebia fusciceps Chaudoir, 1871
Lebia fuscula Chaudoir, 1871
Lebia gabonica Chaudoir, 1871
Lebia gansuensis Jedlicka, 1933
Lebia garambae Basilewsky, 1962
Lebia gaudichaudi Laporte, 1835
Lebia gemina Baehr, 2004
Lebia gibba Darlington, 1936
Lebia gloriosa Liebke, 1938
Lebia goniessa Bates, 1883
Lebia goudoti (Chaudoir, 1871)
Lebia gounellei Liebke, 1935
Lebia grammica Perty, 1830
Lebia granaria Putzeys, 1845
Lebia graphica Liebke, 1938
Lebia grata Liebke, 1939
Lebia gratiosa (Chaudoir, 1871)
Lebia gregoryi Baehr, 2012
Lebia grimmi Baehr, 2015
Lebia guttata Motschulsky, 1864
Lebia guttula LeConte, 1851
Lebia guyanensis Chaudoir, 1871
Lebia haitiana Darlington, 1936
Lebia halli Basilewsky, 1948
Lebia halmaherae Baehr, 2010
Lebia hamata Liebke, 1938
Lebia handenia Basilewsky, 1962
Lebia haplomera Chaudoir, 1871
Lebia heraldica Bates, 1883
Lebia hexasticta Liebke, 1936
Lebia heydenii Putzeys, 1845
Lebia heyrovskyi Jedlicka, 1933
Lebia hilaris (Chaudoir, 1871)
Lebia hirsutula Basilewsky, 1962
Lebia histrionica Bates, 1883
Lebia holomera Chaudoir, 1871
Lebia horni Liebke, 1934
Lebia humeralis Dejean, 1825
Lebia humeroguttata (Chaudoir, 1871)
Lebia ignita Bates, 1883
Lebia illustris Liebke, 1938
Lebia imitator Péringuey, 1896
Lebia imperfecta Liebke, 1934
Lebia incohaerens Chaudoir, 1871
Lebia incommoda Chaudoir, 1871
Lebia inconspicua Péringuey, 1896
Lebia inconstans Bates, 1883
Lebia inedita Péringuey, 1904
Lebia inornata Baehr, 2004
Lebia insecticollis Landin, 1955
Lebia insularis Boheman, 1859
Lebia insularum Darlington, 1968
Lebia insulata Madge, 1967
Lebia intermedia (Chaudoir, 1871)
Lebia irregularis Chaudoir, 1871
Lebia ivorensis Basilewsky, 1968
Lebia jacksoni Basilewsky, 1948
Lebia jakli Baehr, 2015
Lebia jeanneli Liebke, 1935
Lebia jedlickai Liebke, 1935
Lebia jucunda Kirsch, 1873
Lebia jureceki Jedlicka, 1933
Lebia karenia Bates, 1892
Lebia kayetea Liebke, 1935
Lebia keiana Baehr, 2012
Lebia klapperichi Jedlicka, 1953
Lebia klickai Jedlicka, 1933
Lebia lacerata Chaudoir, 1871
Lebia lacerta Andrewes, 1929
Lebia laetula Chaudoir, 1871
Lebia lalehzarensis Azadbakhsh & Kirschenhofer, 2018
Lebia lapaza Liebke, 1935
Lebia lata Landin, 1955
Lebia lateplagiata Basilewsky, 1949
Lebia laticollis Baehr, 2004
Lebia latifascia Chaudoir, 1871
Lebia latiuscula (Chaudoir, 1871)
Lebia lauta Liebke, 1938
Lebia lecta G.Horn, 1885
Lebia lemoulti Basilewsky, 1948
Lebia lepida Brullé, 1834
Lebia leprieuri Dejean, 1831
Lebia leptodera (Chaudoir, 1871)
Lebia lesnei Liebke, 1935
Lebia leucaspis Andrewes, 1936
Lebia levicula Liebke, 1938
Lebia libita Liebke, 1938
Lebia limbata Steinheil, 1875
Lebia lindemannae Jedlicka, 1963
Lebia lineola Andrewes, 1929
Lebia lobulata LeConte, 1863
Lebia longiloba Chaudoir, 1871
Lebia longipennis Putzeys, 1845
Lebia lubrica Liebke, 1938
Lebia lunigera Andrewes, 1933
Lebia luteocincta Chaudoir, 1871
Lebia luteofasciata Chaudoir, 1871
Lebia luzoensis Jedlicka, 1933
Lebia maculicollis Putzeys, 1845
Lebia marani Jedlicka, 1933
Lebia maraniana Kult, 1943
Lebia marginata (Geoffroy in Fourcroy, 1785)
Lebia marginicollis Dejean, 1825
Lebia masaica Basilewsky, 1962
Lebia maya Bates, 1883
Lebia maynei Burgeon, 1937
Lebia mayumbensis Basilewsky, 1967
Lebia meinkeana Jedlicka, 1965
Lebia melanonota Chaudoir, 1871
Lebia melanoptera Chaudoir, 1871
Lebia melantho Bates, 1883
Lebia menetriesi Ballion, 1869
Lebia mesostigma Bates, 1883
Lebia mesoxantha (Kirsch, 1873)
Lebia microtes Bates, 1883
Lebia minarum Putzeys, 1845
Lebia mindanaensis Jedlicka, 1933
Lebia minima Péringuey, 1898
Lebia minuscula Liebke, 1938
Lebia minuta Chaudoir, 1871
Lebia minutula Basilewsky, 1949
Lebia mira Basilewsky, 1948
Lebia mirabilis Bates, 1883
Lebia mirabunda Liebke, 1938
Lebia miranda (G.Horn, 1872)
Lebia mirifica Jedlicka, 1956
Lebia misabena Basilewsky, 1968
Lebia moesta LeConte, 1850
Lebia monostigma Andrewes, 1923
Lebia monteithi Baehr, 2004
Lebia montivaga Liebke, 1938
Lebia mushai Jedlicka, 1951
Lebia myops Dejean, 1831
Lebia natalis Péringuey, 1898
Lebia neanthe Bates, 1883
Lebia nemoralis Chaudoir, 1871
Lebia nevermanni Liebke, 1939
Lebia nigricapitata Madge, 1967
Lebia nigriceps Chaudoir, 1871
Lebia nigrita Darlington, 1936
Lebia nigrofasciata Putzeys, 1845
Lebia nigrolineata Reiche, 1842
Lebia nigromaculata Gory, 1833
Lebia nilotica Chaudoir, 1871
Lebia novabritannica Baehr, 2004
Lebia nubicola Darlington, 1939
Lebia obenbergeri Jedlicka, 1933
Lebia obscurata Liebke, 1940
Lebia obscuriceps Chaudoir, 1871
Lebia obsoleta Chaudoir, 1871
Lebia ocellata Andrewes, 1933
Lebia ohausi Liebke, 1939
Lebia olivacea Chaudoir, 1850
Lebia oliviella Bates, 1883
Lebia omostigma Chaudoir, 1871
Lebia orissa Basilewsky, 1962
Lebia ornamentalis Liebke, 1938
Lebia ornata Say, 1823
Lebia pallida Reichardt, 1972
Lebia pallipes Gory, 1833
Lebia papuella Darlington, 1968
Lebia papuensis W.J.MacLeay, 1876
Lebia paramicola Moret, 2005
Lebia pauliana Liebke, 1938
Lebia pectita G.Horn, 1885
Lebia peguensis Jedlicka, 1965
Lebia peregrinator Péringuey, 1896
Lebia perita Casey, 1920
Lebia permutata Baehr, 2004
Lebia perpallida Madge, 1967
Lebia perspicillaris (Chaudoir, 1871)
Lebia peruana Lutshnik, 1922
Lebia phantasma Péringuey, 1904
Lebia phonsavan Kirschenhofer, 2012
Lebia picicollis Chaudoir, 1871
Lebia picolina Liebke, 1935
Lebia picta (Steinheil, 1875)
Lebia pilula Liebke, 1938
Lebia placida Basilewsky, 1949
Lebia planiuscula Chaudoir, 1871
Lebia platensis (Chaudoir, 1871)
Lebia plaumanni Liebke, 1938
Lebia pleuritica LeConte, 1846
Lebia pleurodera Chaudoir, 1871
Lebia poecilura Bates, 1883
Lebia promontorii Péringuey, 1908
Lebia pseudolytata Basilewsky, 1949
Lebia puella Dejean, 1831
Lebia pulchella Dejean, 1826
Lebia pulla (Chaudoir, 1871)
Lebia pumila Dejean, 1831
Lebia pusilla Brullé, 1838
Lebia putzeysi Bedel, 1878
Lebia quadratica Liebke, 1935
Lebia quadraticollis Liebke, 1938
Lebia quadricolor Chevrolat, 1834
Lebia quadrimaculata (Motschulsky, 1864)
Lebia quadriplagiata (Chaudoir, 1871)
Lebia quadritincta Chaudoir, 1871
Lebia quinquenotata Chaudoir, 1871
Lebia raeesae Rasool; Abdel-Dayem; Felix & Aldhafer, 2018
Lebia reflexicollis Chaudoir, 1843
Lebia renalis Liebke, 1935
Lebia resurgens Chaudoir, 1871
Lebia reticulata Liebke, 1938
Lebia retusa Bates, 1883
Lebia reventazonica Liebke, 1936
Lebia rhodope Bates, 1883
Lebia rhombifera Louwerens, 1953
Lebia rhyticrania Chaudoir, 1871
Lebia riedeli Liebke, 1939
Lebia rotundipennis Putzeys, 1845
Lebia roubali Jedlicka, 1951
Lebia ruficeps (Chaudoir, 1871)
Lebia rufopleura Schaeffer, 1910
Lebia rugatifrons (Chaudoir, 1871)
Lebia rugiceps Brullé, 1838
Lebia rugifrons Dejean, 1831
Lebia rutifia Bates, 1883
Lebia ruwenzorica Burgeon, 1937
Lebia salomona Baehr, 2004
Lebia scalata Liebke, 1935
Lebia scalpta Bates, 1883
Lebia scapula G.Horn, 1885
Lebia scapularis (Geoffroy in Fourcroy, 1785)
Lebia schoutedeni Burgeon, 1937
Lebia scitula Chaudoir, 1871
Lebia sculpticollis Liebke, 1939
Lebia sebakuana Péringuey, 1908
Lebia securigera (Chaudoir, 1871)
Lebia sedlaceki Baehr, 2004
Lebia sellata Dejean, 1825
Lebia senegalensis Chaudoir, 1871
Lebia sericea Liebke, 1935
Lebia sexmaculata Buquet, 1835
Lebia sharovae Basilewsky, 1962
Lebia shimbana Basilewsky, 1948
Lebia silvatica Liebke, 1951
Lebia similis Chaudoir, 1871
Lebia simillima Chaudoir, 1871
Lebia simoni Liebke, 1935
Lebia simulatoria Péringuey, 1904
Lebia sinanja Bates, 1883
Lebia singaporensis Jedlicka, 1933
Lebia smaragdinipennis Reiche, 1842
Lebia smithiella Bates, 1891
Lebia solea Hentz, 1830
Lebia soror Chaudoir, 1871
Lebia speciosa Péringuey, 1896
Lebia sperabilis Péringuey, 1898
Lebia steinbachi Liebke, 1938
Lebia stepaneki Jedlicka, 1951
Lebia sticticeps Chaudoir, 1871
Lebia strandi Liebke, 1939
Lebia straneoi Basilewsky, 1948
Lebia striaticeps Chaudoir, 1871
Lebia striaticollis Chaudoir, 1835
Lebia striatifrons Chaudoir, 1871
Lebia subfasciata Chaudoir, 1871
Lebia subglabra Baehr, 2004
Lebia subinterrupta Chaudoir, 1871
Lebia submaculata Motschulsky, 1864
Lebia subrugosa Chaudoir, 1871
Lebia subtilis (Chaudoir, 1871)
Lebia sulcata Dejean, 1825
Lebia sulcatella Liebke, 1935
Lebia sulcatula Liebke, 1939
Lebia sulciceps Liebke, 1935
Lebia sulcipennis Chaudoir, 1871
Lebia susterai Jedlicka, 1951
Lebia syriaca Pic, 1901
Lebia tanarataensis Kirschenhofer, 2003
Lebia tanta Jedlicka, 1933
Lebia tau Schmidt-Goebel, 1846
Lebia tendicula Liebke, 1938
Lebia tenella Péringuey, 1908
Lebia tenenbaumi Liebke, 1938
Lebia tericola Darlington, 1939
Lebia terminalis Putzeys, 1846
Lebia testudinea (Chaudoir, 1871)
Lebia thais Bedel, 1897
Lebia tigrana Liebke, 1939
Lebia timorensis Baehr, 2017
Lebia togata Liebke, 1935
Lebia tolteca Bates, 1883
Lebia trapezicollis (Chaudoir, 1871)
Lebia tremolerasi Liebke, 1938
Lebia trigona Liebke, 1935
Lebia trimaculata (Villers, 1789)
Lebia trisignata Brullé, 1838
Lebia trivittoides Baehr, 2012
Lebia tropica Liebke, 1934
Lebia trullata Liebke, 1938
Lebia truncatipennis Landin, 1955
Lebia tsaritsa Basilewsky, 1948
Lebia tschitscherini Lutshnik, 1922
Lebia tuckeri (Casey, 1920)
Lebia turkestanica Jedlicka, 1966
Lebia umbrata Chaudoir, 1871
Lebia umtalina Péringuey, 1904
Lebia unimaculata Motschulsky, 1864
Lebia vaciva Péringuey, 1898
Lebia vagans Péringuey, 1896
Lebia variegata Dejean, 1831
Lebia venezolana Liebke, 1938
Lebia venustula Dejean, 1831
Lebia vianai Liebke, 1939
Lebia vicina (Chaudoir, 1871)
Lebia vilcanota Liebke, 1934
Lebia violacea Chaudoir, 1871
Lebia violata Jedlicka, 1963
Lebia viridipennis Dejean, 1826
Lebia viridis Say, 1823
Lebia viriditincta Basilewsky, 1962
Lebia vittata (Fabricius, 1777)
Lebia vittigera Dejean, 1831
Lebia wagneri Liebke, 1935
Lebia weigeli Baehr, 2005
Lebia wittei Burgeon, 1937
Lebia x-nigrum Putzeys, 1845
Lebia xanthogona Bates, 1883
Lebia xanthophaea Chaudoir, 1871
Lebia xanthopleura Chaudoir, 1871
Lebia yucatana Chaudoir, 1871
Lebia yunnana Jedlicka, 1933
Lebia zanzibarica Chaudoir, 1878
Lebia zeta Bates, 1883
Lebia zonata Chaudoir, 1850
Lebia zuluensis Csiki, 1932

Subgenus Liopeza Chaudoir, 1871
Lebia thoracella Lorenz, 1998
Subgenus Loxopeza Chaudoir, 1871

Lebia angustula Oberthür, 1883
Lebia atriceps LeConte, 1863
Lebia atriventris Say, 1823
Lebia calomicra (Bates, 1891)
Lebia chloroptera Chaudoir, 1835
Lebia costulata (Bates, 1883)
Lebia cyane (Bates, 1883)
Lebia deceptrix Madge, 1967
Lebia eburata (Bates, 1883)
Lebia grandis Hentz, 1830
Lebia guatemalena (Bates, 1883)
Lebia hoegei (Bates, 1883)
Lebia melanocephala (Chaudoir, 1871)
Lebia obliquata Dejean, 1831
Lebia pimalis (Casey, 1920)
Lebia rufolimbata (Chaudoir, 1871)
Lebia rufosutura (Motschulsky, 1864)
Lebia striata Dejean, 1831
Lebia subdola Madge, 1967
Lebia subgrandis Madge, 1967
Lebia translucens (Bates, 1883)
Lebia tricolor Say, 1823
Lebia urania (Bates, 1883)
Lebia xanthogaster (Bates, 1883)
Lebia yoloensis (Bates, 1883)

Subgenus Metalebia Jeannel, 1949

Lebia alluaudana Jeannel, 1949
Lebia antelobata (Basilewsky, 1955)
Lebia apicoviolacea Kavanaugh & Rainio, 2016
Lebia atsima Alluaud, 1936
Lebia brunneipennis Jeannel, 1949
Lebia calycina Gerstaecker, 1867
Lebia cerrutii (Basilewsky, 1953)
Lebia consobrina Jeannel, 1949
Lebia decorsei Alluaud, 1936
Lebia distinctenotata (Basilewsky, 1956)
Lebia fortuita Péringuey, 1898
Lebia franzi Mateu, 1970
Lebia ghesquierei Basilewsky, 1949
Lebia katangana (Basilewsky, 1953)
Lebia kivuensis Burgeon, 1937
Lebia laterolucida Kavanaugh & Rainio, 2016
Lebia lytata Motschulsky, 1864
Lebia madagascariensis Chaudoir, 1850
Lebia mirana Alluaud, 1936
Lebia monticola Barker, 1919
Lebia nanna Jeannel, 1949
Lebia natalensis Chaudoir, 1871
Lebia nigrocincta (Basilewsky, 1956)
Lebia nyamukubiensis Burgeon, 1937
Lebia omoxantha Alluaud, 1936
Lebia parvicollis Jeannel, 1949
Lebia perrieri Jeannel, 1949
Lebia pseudogabonica Basilewsky, 1949
Lebia ranomafanae Kavanaugh & Rainio, 2016
Lebia rufa Jeannel, 1949
Lebia seyrigi Alluaud, 1936
Lebia sicardi Jeannel, 1949
Lebia stappersi Burgeon, 1937
Lebia sulcipennoides Lorenz, 1998
Lebia tanala Alluaud, 1936
Lebia transvaalensis Péringuey, 1896
Lebia uelensis Burgeon, 1937
Lebia vadoni Alluaud, 1936
Lebia viridella Lorenz, 1998

Subgenus Nematopeza Chaudoir, 1871

Lebia aerea (Jeannel, 1949)
Lebia alluaudi (Jeannel, 1949)
Lebia ambreana (Jeannel, 1949)
Lebia andreinii Straneo, 1943
Lebia androyana (Jeannel, 1949)
Lebia antanosy (Jeannel, 1949)
Lebia auberti (Fairmaire, 1892)
Lebia baconi (Chaudoir, 1871)
Lebia basalis Chaudoir, 1852
Lebia biplagiata Motschulsky, 1864
Lebia bohumilae (Basilewsky, 1956)
Lebia chaudoiri (Alluaud, 1932)
Lebia comorica (Jeannel, 1949)
Lebia damarica Kuntzen, 1919
Lebia diegana Alluaud, 1897
Lebia dolorosa (Basilewsky, 1956)
Lebia elisabethana Burgeon, 1937
Lebia evicta Péringuey, 1904
Lebia exiguella Lorenz, 1998
Lebia fraterna Péringuey, 1896
Lebia fumata (Chaudoir, 1878)
Lebia immaculata Boheman, 1848
Lebia indagacea Fairmaire, 1904
Lebia indica Liebke, 1939
Lebia insidiosa Péringuey, 1896
Lebia invicta Péringuey, 1896
Lebia kalabe (Jeannel, 1949)
Lebia kalosa (Jeannel, 1949)
Lebia lebisi (Jeannel, 1949)
Lebia leleupi Basilewsky, 1951
Lebia lividipennis (Chaudoir, 1878)
Lebia lualabana (Basilewsky, 1953)
Lebia lucidicollis (Jeannel, 1949)
Lebia melanacra (Chaudoir, 1878)
Lebia melanura Dejean, 1831
Lebia miniata Lorenz, 1998
Lebia modesta Boheman, 1848
Lebia nobilis Boheman, 1848
Lebia obesa (Jeannel, 1949)
Lebia obtusa (Jeannel, 1949)
Lebia olsoufieffi (Jeannel, 1949)
Lebia perinetana (Jeannel, 1949)
Lebia pervicina Lorenz, 1998
Lebia picea (Jeannel, 1949)
Lebia pusillima Lorenz, 1998
Lebia ripicola Kuntzen, 1919
Lebia sahy (Jeannel, 1949)
Lebia semicyanea Fairmaire, 1901
Lebia sicardiana (Jeannel, 1949)
Lebia silvatica (Jeannel, 1949)
Lebia silvestris (Jeannel, 1949)
Lebia stricticollis (Jeannel, 1949)
Lebia submetallica (Jeannel, 1949)
Lebia verisimilis Barker, 1919
Lebia viridicolor Lorenz, 1998

Subgenus Nipponolebia Habu, 1983
Lebia duplex Bates, 1883
Subgenus Odontopeza Felix, 2014
Lebia socotrana Felix, 2014
Subgenus Poecilostola Chaudoir, 1871
Lebia discophora (Chaudoir, 1871)
Lebia nebulosa (Chaudoir, 1871)
Lebia opima (Liebke, 1939)
Lebia pendula Putzeys, 1845
Lebia plaumanni (Liebke, 1939)
Subgenus Poecilothais Maindron, 1905

Lebia aglaia Andrewes, 1930
Lebia benoiti (Basilewsky, 1952)
Lebia bifenestrata A.Morawitz, 1862
Lebia bisbinotata Murray, 1857
Lebia calycophora Schmidt-Goebel, 1846
Lebia circumdata Schmidt-Goebel, 1846
Lebia cognatella Lorenz, 1998
Lebia consors (Péringuey, 1898)
Lebia crockerensis Kirschenhofer, 2010
Lebia cucphuongensis Kirschenhofer, 2010
Lebia dabashanensis Kirschenhofer, 2009
Lebia dalibaiensis Kirschenhofer, 2009
Lebia deplanata Gerstaecker, 1867
Lebia erlangshanensis Kirschenhofer, 2009
Lebia farkaci Kirschenhofer, 2010
Lebia fassatii Jedlicka, 1951
Lebia fusca A.Morawitz, 1863
Lebia gentilis (Péringuey, 1896)
Lebia gressoria Chaudoir, 1871
Lebia hikosana Habu, 1955
Lebia hongsonensis Kirschenhofer, 2010
Lebia humpatensis Bates, 1889
Lebia hypoxantha Gerstaecker, 1867
Lebia idae Bates, 1873
Lebia iolanthe Bates, 1883
Lebia jinggangensis Kirschenhofer, 2009
Lebia kathmanduensis Kirschenhofer, 2010
Lebia kiangsiensis Kirschenhofer, 2009
Lebia kinabaluensis Kirschenhofer, 2010
Lebia laosensis Kirschenhofer, 2010
Lebia levana Kirschenhofer, 2009
Lebia madecassa (Alluaud, 1936)
Lebia maharashtra Kirschenhofer, 2011
Lebia malickyi Kirschenhofer, 2010
Lebia miwai Jedlicka, 1951
Lebia nantouensis Kirschenhofer, 2009
Lebia nepalensis Kirschenhofer, 2010
Lebia phuongensis Kirschenhofer, 2009
Lebia picipennis Motschulsky, 1864
Lebia pseudosellata Kirschenhofer, 2010
Lebia punggulensis Kirschenhofer, 2010
Lebia purkynei Jedlicka, 1933
Lebia retrofasciata Motschulsky, 1864
Lebia sandaligera Bates, 1873
Lebia sanpakia Kirschenhofer, 2011
Lebia schmidtgoebeli Lorenz, 1998
Lebia shimianensis Kirschenhofer, 2009
Lebia stackelbergi Kryzhanovskij, 1987
Lebia stichai Jedlicka, 1933
Lebia sylvarum Bates, 1883
Lebia taipingensis Kirschenhofer, 2011
Lebia temburongensis Kirschenhofer, 2010
Lebia tuongensis Kirschenhofer, 2010
Lebia vientianensis Kirschenhofer, 2010
Lebia vietnamensis Kirschenhofer, 2009
Lebia yunnanensis Kirschenhofer, 2009
Lebia zhejiangensis Kirschenhofer, 2010

Subgenus Polycheloma Madge, 1967
Lebia lecontei Madge, 1967
Subgenus Promecochila Chaudoir, 1871
Lebia capensis Chaudoir, 1835
Lebia nigra (Péringuey, 1896)
Subgenus Rhytidopeza Jeannel, 1949
Lebia catalai (Jeannel, 1949)
Lebia puncticollis (Jeannel, 1949)
Subgenus Stephana Chaudoir, 1871
Lebia princeps Chaudoir, 1852
Not assigned to a subgenus
†Lebia amissa C. & L.Heyden, 1865
†Lebia harrelli Cockerell, 1936
†Lebia minuscula Piton, 1936
†Lebia protospiloptera Cockerell, 1921
