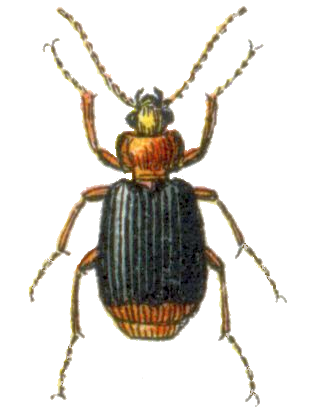

Scientific classification
- Domain: Eukaryota
- Kingdom: Animalia
- Phylum: Arthropoda
- Class: Insecta
- Order: Coleoptera
- Suborder: Adephaga
- Family: Carabidae
- Genus: Lebia
- Species: L. marginata

Binomial name
- Lebia marginata (Geoffroy & Fourcroy 1785)

= Lebia marginata =

Species of beetle

Lebia marginata is a species of ground beetles in the Harpalinae subfamily that can be found in Austria, Belgium, Bulgaria, Czech Republic, Germany, Great Britain, Hungary, Italy, Liechtenstein, Luxembourg, Poland, Romania, Slovakia, Switzerland, Ukraine, Yugoslavian states (except for Croatia and North Macedonia), everywhere in Western Europe, and southern part of Russia.
