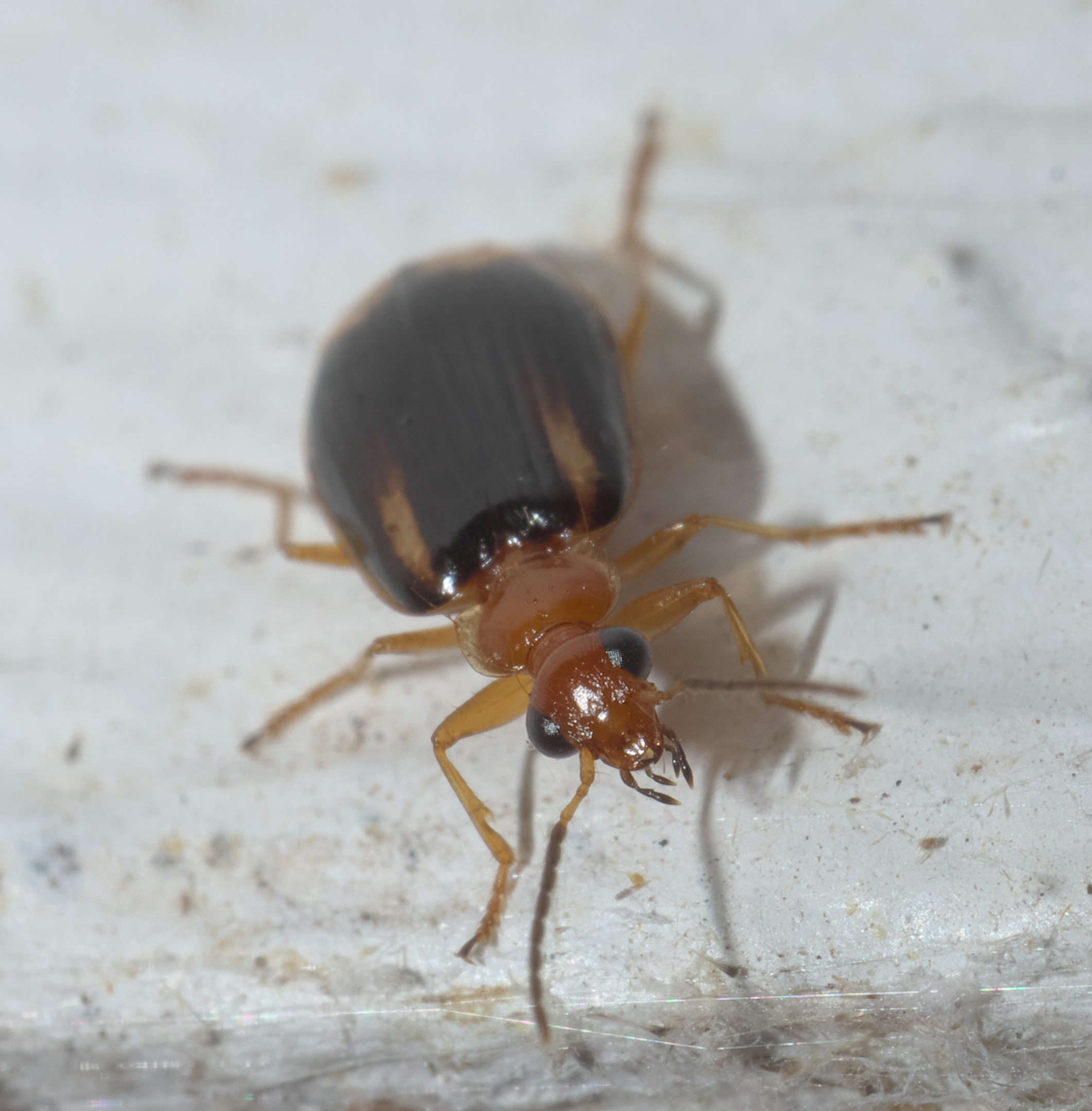

Scientific classification
- Domain: Eukaryota
- Kingdom: Animalia
- Phylum: Arthropoda
- Class: Insecta
- Order: Coleoptera
- Suborder: Adephaga
- Family: Carabidae
- Genus: Lebia
- Species: L. solea

Binomial name
- Lebia solea Hentz, 1830

= Lebia solea =

Species of beetle

Lebia solea is a species of ground beetle in the family Carabidae. It is found in North America.

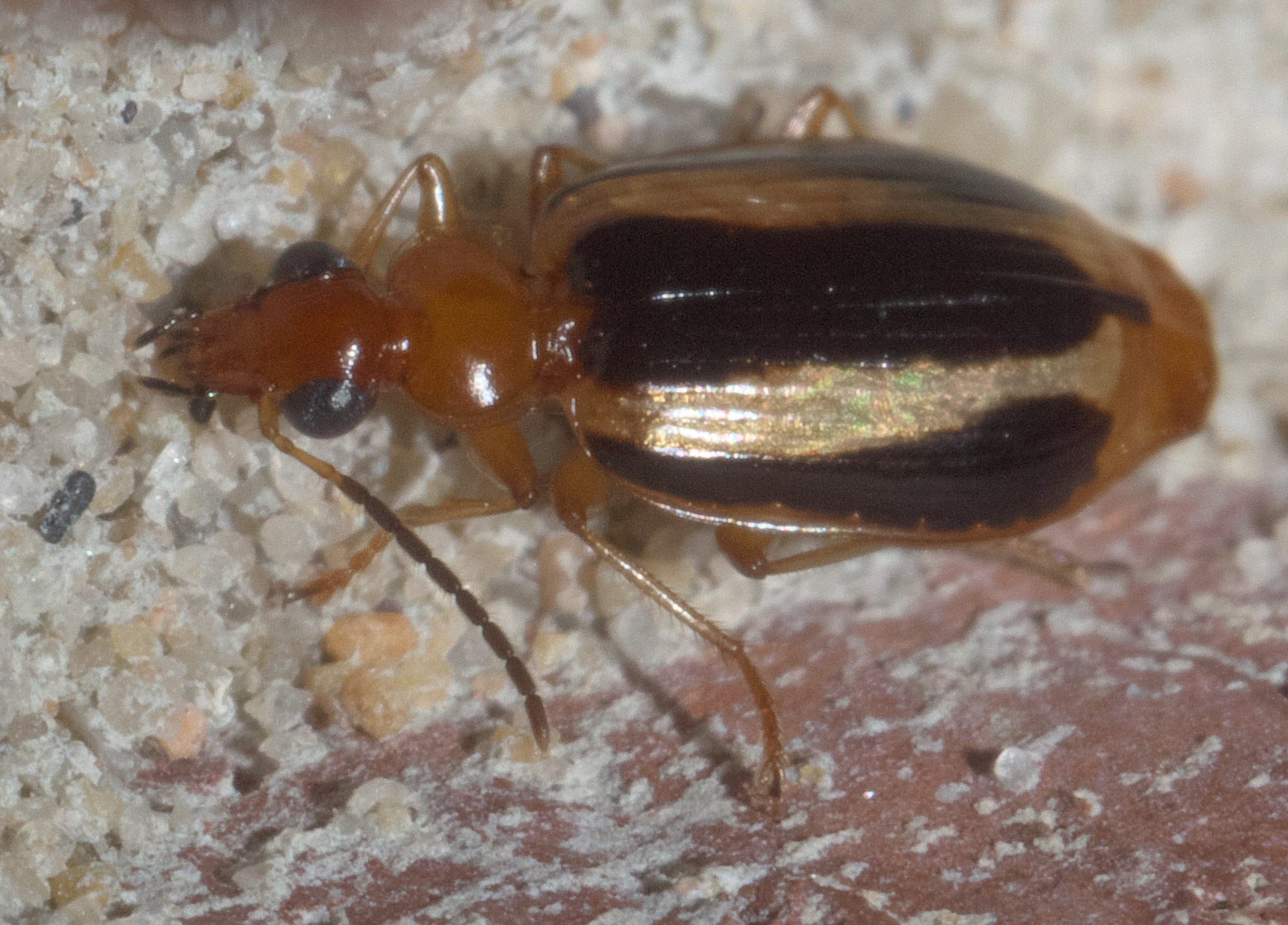
