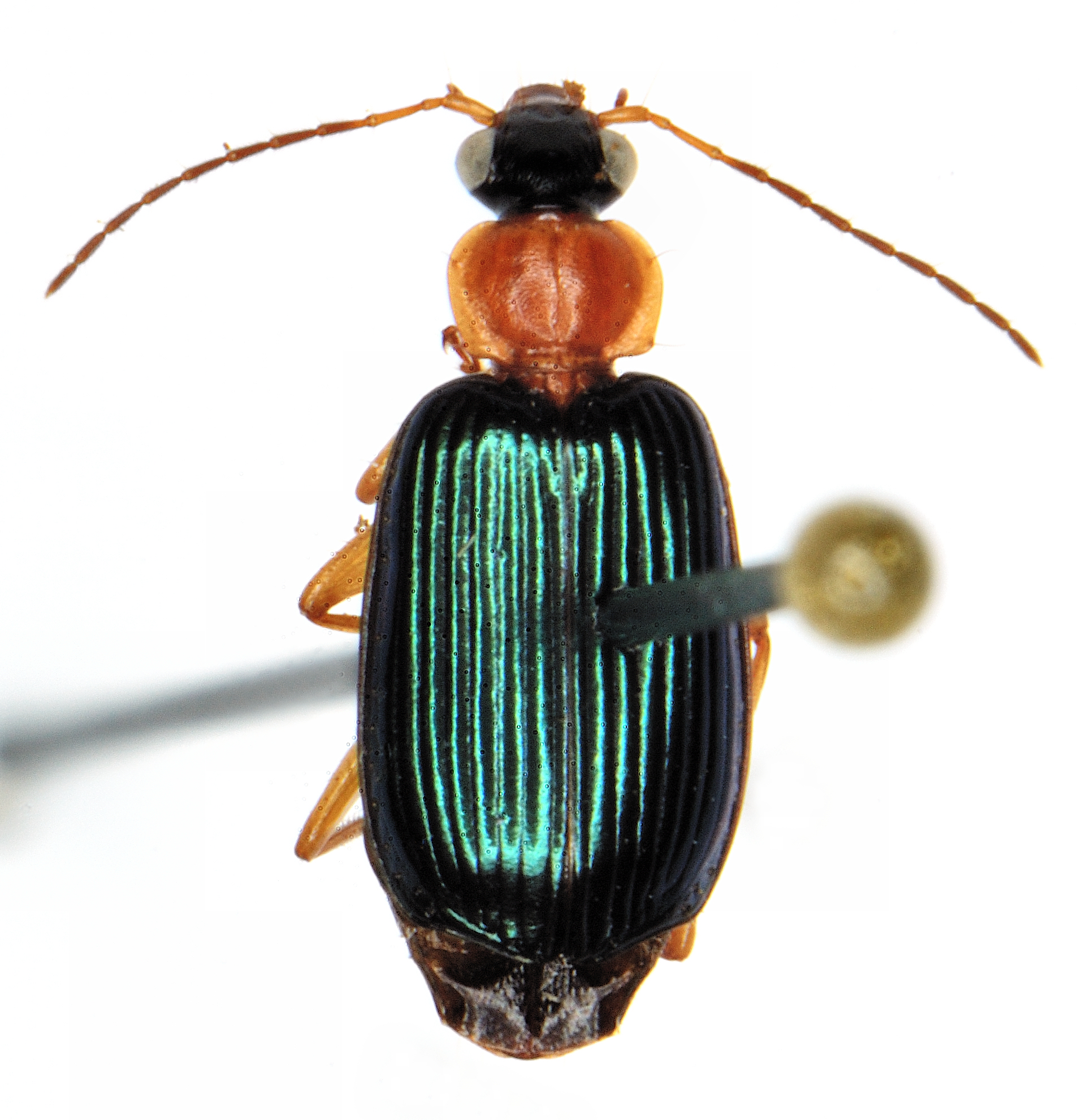

Scientific classification
- Kingdom: Animalia
- Phylum: Arthropoda
- Clade: Pancrustacea
- Class: Insecta
- Order: Coleoptera
- Suborder: Adephaga
- Family: Carabidae
- Genus: Lebia
- Species: L. tricolor

Binomial name
- Lebia tricolor Say, 1823

= Lebia tricolor =

Species of beetle

Lebia tricolor, genus Lebia, in the family of ground beetles, searching for prey.

Lebia tricolor is a species of ground beetle in the family Carabidae. It is found in North America.
