= Lebia deceptrix =

Scientific classification
- Domain: Eukaryota
- Kingdom: Animalia
- Phylum: Arthropoda
- Class: Insecta
- Order: Coleoptera
- Suborder: Adephaga
- Family: Carabidae
- Genus: Lebia
- Species: L. deceptrix

Binomial name
- Lebia deceptrix Madge, 1967

Species of beetle

Lebia deceptrix is a species of ground beetle in the family Carabidae. It lives in North America.
