= Lebia menetriesi =

Scientific classification
- Domain: Eukaryota
- Kingdom: Animalia
- Phylum: Arthropoda
- Class: Insecta
- Order: Coleoptera
- Suborder: Adephaga
- Family: Carabidae
- Genus: Lebia
- Species: L. menetriesi

Binomial name
- Lebia menetriesi Ballion, 1869

Species of beetle

Lebia menetriesi is a species of ground beetles in the Harpalinae subfamily that can be found in Ukraine and southern part of Russia.
