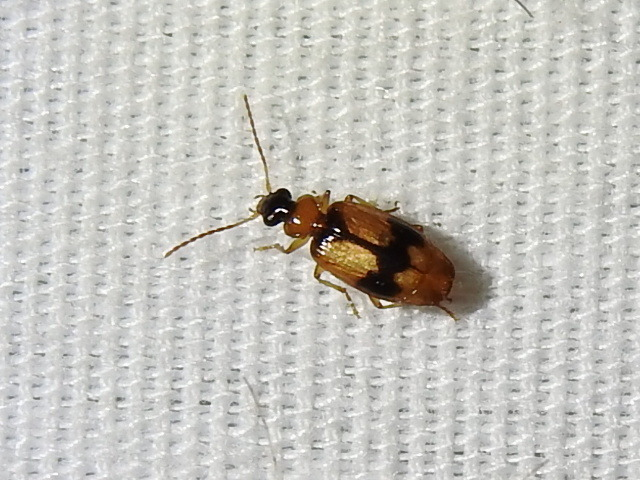

Scientific classification
- Kingdom: Animalia
- Phylum: Arthropoda
- Clade: Pancrustacea
- Class: Insecta
- Order: Coleoptera
- Suborder: Adephaga
- Family: Carabidae
- Genus: Lebia
- Species: L. esurialis

Binomial name
- Lebia esurialis Casey, 1920

= Lebia esurialis =

Species of beetle

Lebia esurialis is a species of beetle in the family Carabidae. It is found in Mexico, on Cuba and the Bahamas, as well as in U.S. states such as Louisiana and Texas.
