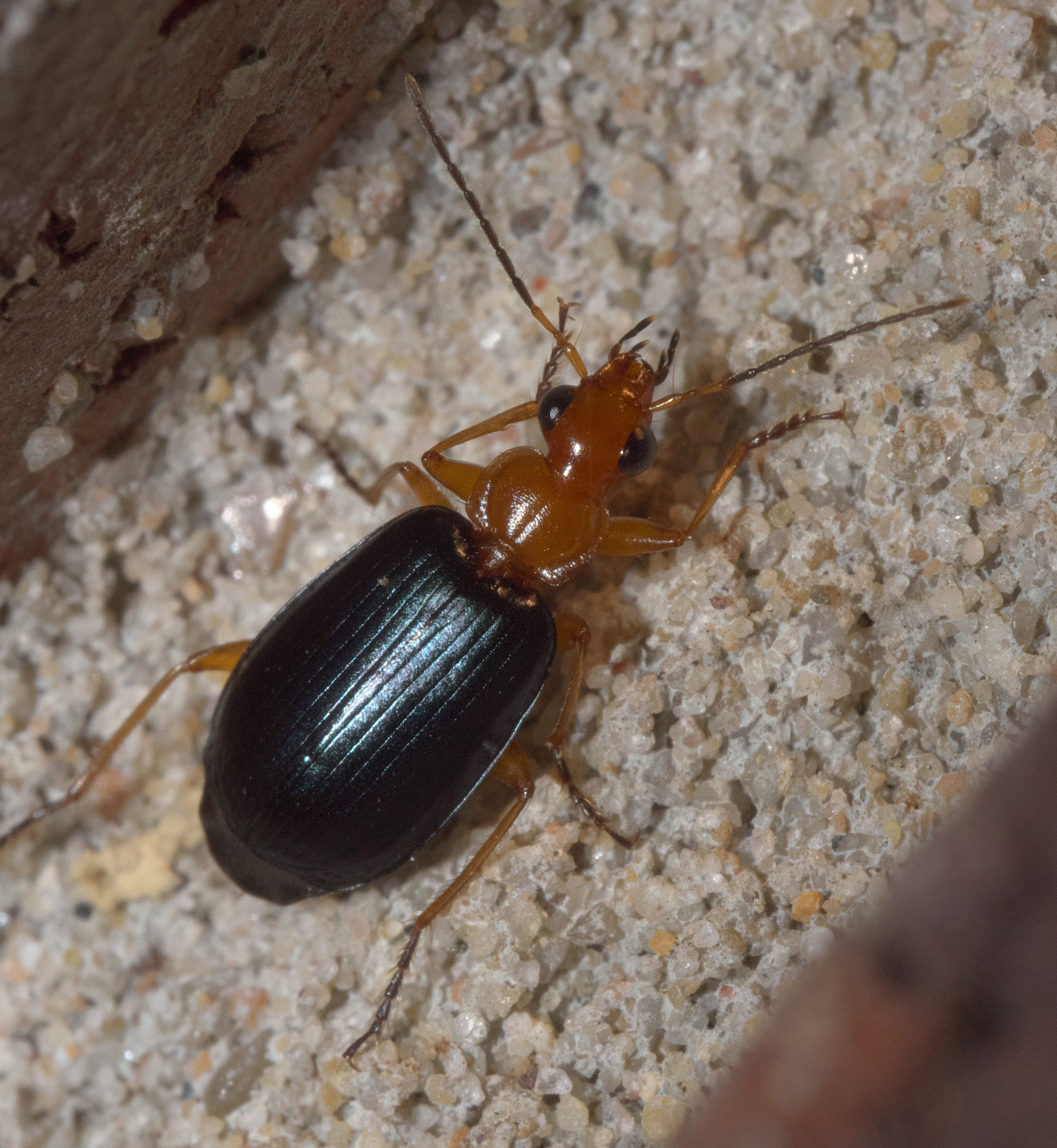

Scientific classification
- Domain: Eukaryota
- Kingdom: Animalia
- Phylum: Arthropoda
- Class: Insecta
- Order: Coleoptera
- Suborder: Adephaga
- Family: Carabidae
- Genus: Lebia
- Species: L. atriventris

Binomial name
- Lebia atriventris Say, 1823

= Lebia atriventris =

Species of beetle

Lebia atriventris is a species of beetle in the family Carabidae. It is found in the United States and Canada.

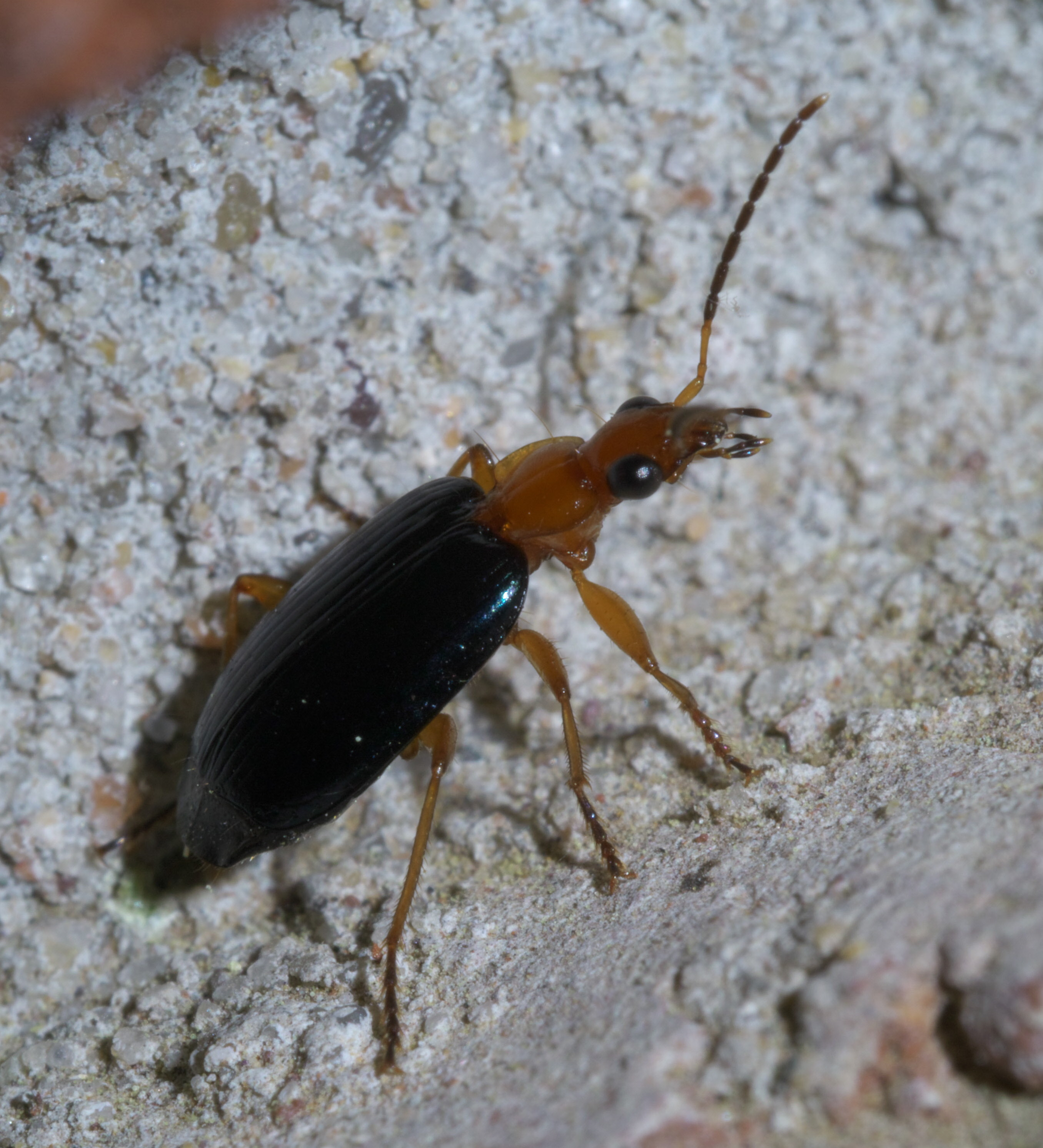
