= Lebia abdita =

Scientific classification
- Domain: Eukaryota
- Kingdom: Animalia
- Phylum: Arthropoda
- Class: Insecta
- Order: Coleoptera
- Suborder: Adephaga
- Family: Carabidae
- Genus: Lebia
- Species: L. abdita

Binomial name
- Lebia abdita Madge, 1967

Species of beetle

Lebia abdita is a species of beetle in the family Carabidae. It is found in Baja California, Arizona and Mexico.
