= List of ground beetle (Carabidae) species recorded in Great Britain =

The following is a list of the ground beetles recorded in Great Britain, organised by subfamily (-inae endings) and by tribe (-ini endings). For other beetle families, see the main list of beetle species recorded in Britain.

== Cicindelinae Latreille, 1802 ==
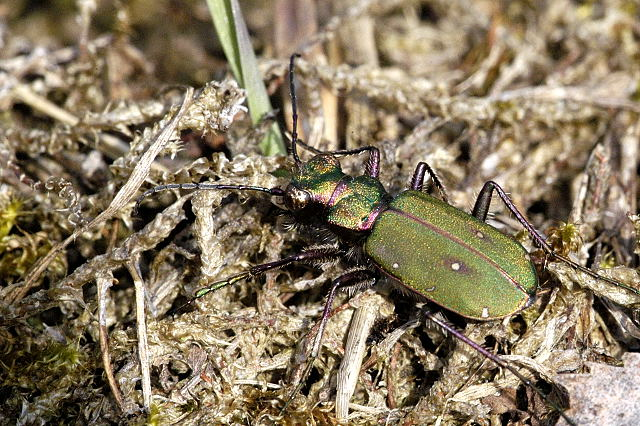
Cicindela campestris

- Cicindela campestris Linnaeus, 1758
- Cicindela hybrida Linnaeus, 1758
- Cicindela maritima Latreille & Dejean, 1822
- Cicindela sylvatica Linnaeus, 1758
- Cylindera germanica (Linnaeus, 1758)

== Brachininae Bonelli, 1810 ==
- Brachinus crepitans (Linnaeus, 1758)
- Brachinus sclopeta (Fabricius, 1792)

== Omophroninae Bonelli, 1810 ==
- Omophron limbatum (Fabricius, 1777)

== Carabinae Latreille, 1802 ==
Carabini Latreille, 1802

- Calosoma inquisitor (Linnaeus, 1758)
- Calosoma sycophanta (Linnaeus, 1758)
- Carabus clatratus Linnaeus, 1761
- Carabus arvensis Herbst, 1784
- Carabus granulatus Linnaeus, 1758
- Carabus monilis Fabricius, 1792
- Carabus nemoralis O. F. Müller, 1764
- Carabus auratus Linnaeus, 1761
- Carabus nitens Linnaeus, 1758
- Carabus glabratus Paykull, 1790
- Carabus problematicus Herbst, 1786
- Carabus intricatus Linnaeus, 1761
- Carabus violaceus Linnaeus, 1758
- Cychrus caraboides (Linnaeus, 1758)

Nebriini Laporte, 1834

- Leistus montanus Stephens, 1827
- Leistus rufomarginatus (Duftschmid, 1812)
- Leistus spinibarbis (Fabricius, 1775)
- Leistus fulvibarbis Dejean, 1826
- Leistus ferrugineus (Linnaeus, 1758)
- Leistus terminatus (Hellwig in Panzer, 1793)
- Nebria livida (Linnaeus, 1758)
- Nebria brevicollis (Fabricius, 1792)
- Nebria salina Fairmaire & Laboulbène, 1854
- Nebria nivalis (Paykull, 1790)
- Nebria rufescens (Ström, 1768)
- Eurynebria complanata (Linnaeus, 1767)
- Pelophila borealis (Paykull, 1790)

Notiophilini Motschulsky, 1850

- Notiophilus aesthuans Motschulsky, 1864
- Notiophilus aquaticus (Linnaeus, 1758)
- Notiophilus biguttatus (Fabricius, 1779)
- Notiophilus germinyi Fauvel, 1863
- Notiophilus palustris (Duftschmid, 1812)
- Notiophilus quadripunctatus Dejean, 1826
- Notiophilus rufipes Curtis, 1829
- Notiophilus substriatus G. R. Waterhouse, 1833

Elaphrini Latreille, 1802

- Blethisa multipunctata (Linnaeus, 1758)
- Elaphrus cupreus Duftschmid, 1812
- Elaphrus lapponicus Gyllenhal, 1810
- Elaphrus uliginosus Fabricius, 1792
- Elaphrus riparius (Linnaeus, 1758)

Loricerini Bonelli, 1810

- Loricera pilicornis (Fabricius, 1775)
- Clivina collaris (Herbst, 1784)
- Clivina fossor (Linnaeus, 1758)
- Dyschirius angustatus (Ahrens, 1830)
- Dyschirius obscurus (Gyllenhal, 1827)
- Dyschirius thoracicus (Rossi, 1790)
- Dyschirius aeneus (Dejean, 1825)
- Dyschirius extensus Putzeys, 1846
- Dyschirius globosus (Herbst, 1784)
- Dyschirius impunctipennis Dawson, 1854
- Dyschirius luedersi Wagner, 1915
- Dyschirius nitidus (Dejean, 1825)
- Dyschirius politus (Dejean, 1825)
- Dyschirius salinus Schaum, 1843

Broscini Hope, 1838

- Broscus cephalotes (Linnaeus, 1758)
- Miscodera arctica (Paykull, 1798)

Trechini Bonelli, 1810

- Perileptus areolatus (Creutzer, 1799)
- Aepus marinus (Ström, 1783)
- Aepus robinii (Laboulbène, 1849)
- Trechus rivularis (Gyllenhal, 1810)
- Trechus secalis (Paykull, 1790)
- Trechus fulvus Dejean, 1831
- Trechus obtusus Erichson, 1837
- Trechus quadristriatus (Schrank, 1781)
- Trechus rubens (Fabricius, 1792)
- Trechus subnotatus Dejean, 1831
- Thalassophilus longicornis (Sturm, 1825)
- Blemus discus (Fabricius, 1792)
- Trechoblemus micros (Herbst, 1784)
- Tachys bistriatus (Duftschmid, 1812) ?
- Tachys micros (Fischer von Waldheim, 1828)
- Tachys obtusiusculus (Jeannel, 1941)
- Tachys scutellaris Stephens, 1828
- Elaphropus parvulus (Dejean, 1831)
- Elaphropus walkerianus (Sharp, 1913)
- Asaphidion curtum (Heyden, 1870)
- Asaphidion flavipes (Linnaeus, 1761)
- Asaphidion pallipes (Duftschmid, 1812)
- Asaphidion stierlini (Heyden, 1880)
- Ocys harpaloides (Audinet-Serville, 1821)
- Ocys quinquestriatus (Gyllenhal, 1810)
- Cillenus lateralis Samouelle, 1819
- Bracteon argenteolum (Ahrens, 1812)
- Bracteon litorale (Olivier, 1790)
- Bembidion nigricorne Gyllenhal, 1827
- Bembidion lampros (Herbst, 1784)
- Bembidion properans (Stephens, 1828)
- Bembidion punctulatum Drapiez, 1821
- Bembidion pallidipenne (Illiger, 1802)
- Bembidion bipunctatum (Linnaeus, 1761)
- Bembidion dentellum (Thunberg, 1787)
- Bembidion obliquum Sturm, 1825
- Bembidion semipunctatum (Donovan, 1806)
- Bembidion varium (Olivier, 1795)
- Bembidion ephippium (Marsham, 1802)
- Bembidion prasinum (Duftschmid, 1812)
- Bembidion virens Gyllenhal, 1827
- Bembidion atrocaeruleum (Stephens, 1828)
- Bembidion caeruleum Audinet-Serville, 1826
- Bembidion geniculatum Heer, 1837/8
- Bembidion tibiale (Duftschmid, 1812)
- Bembidion bruxellense Wesmael, 1835
- Bembidion bualei Jacquelin du Val, 1852
- Bembidion decorum (Zenker in Panzer, 1800)
- Bembidion deletum Audinet-Serville, 1821
- Bembidion femoratum Sturm, 1825
- Bembidion fluviatile Dejean, 1831
- Bembidion lunatum (Duftschmid, 1812)
- Bembidion maritimum (Stephens, 1835)
- Bembidion monticola Sturm, 1825
- Bembidion saxatile Gyllenhal, 1827
- Bembidion stephensii Crotch, 1866
- Bembidion testaceum (Duftschmid, 1812)
- Bembidion tetracolum Say, 1825
- Bembidion illigeri Netolitzky, 1914
- Bembidion stomoides Dejean, 1831
- Bembidion inustum Jacquelin du Val, 1857
- Bembidion nigropiceum (Marsham, 1802)
- Bembidion gilvipes Sturm, 1825
- Bembidion schuppelii Dejean, 1831
- Bembidion assimile Gyllenhal, 1810
- Bembidion clarkii (Dawson, 1849)
- Bembidion fumigatum (Duftschmid, 1812)
- Bembidion minimum (Fabricius, 1792)
- Bembidion normannum Dejean, 1831
- Bembidion humerale Sturm, 1825
- Bembidion quadrimaculatum (Linnaeus, 1761)
- Bembidion quadripustulatum Audinet-Serville, 1821
- Bembidion doris (Panzer, 1796)
- Bembidion articulatum (Panzer, 1795)
- Bembidion octomaculatum (Goeze, 1777)
- Bembidion obtusum Audinet-Serville, 1821
- Bembidion aeneum Germar, 1824
- Bembidion biguttatum (Fabricius, 1779)
- Bembidion guttula (Fabricius, 1792)
- Bembidion iricolor Bedel, 1879
- Bembidion lunulatum (Geoffroy in Fourcroy, 1785)
- Bembidion mannerheimii C. R. Sahlberg, 1827
- Pogonus chalceus (Marsham, 1802)Fephi
- Pogonus littoralis (Duftschmid, 1812)
- Pogonus luridipennis (Germar, 1822)

Patrobini Kirby, 1837

- Patrobus assimilis Chaudoir, 1844
- Patrobus atrorufus (Ström, 1768)
- Patrobus septentrionis Dejean, 1828

Pterostichini Bonelli, 1810

- Stomis pumicatus (Panzer, 1795)
- Poecilus cupreus (Linnaeus, 1758)
- Poecilus kugelanni (Panzer, 1797)
- Poecilus lepidus (Leske, 1785)
- Poecilus versicolor (Sturm, 1824)
- Pterostichus cristatus (Dufour, 1820)
- Pterostichus aethiops (Panzer, 1796)
- Pterostichus madidus (Fabricius, 1775)
- Pterostichus longicollis (Duftschmid, 1812)
- Pterostichus aterrimus (Herbst, 1784)
- Pterostichus macer (Marsham, 1802)
- Pterostichus niger (Schaller, 1783)
- Pterostichus adstrictus Eschscholtz, 1823
- Pterostichus oblongopunctatus (Fabricius, 1787)
- Pterostichus quadrifoveolatus Letzner, 1852
- Pterostichus melanarius (Illiger, 1798)
- Pterostichus anthracinus (Panzer, 1795)
- Pterostichus gracilis (Dejean, 1828)
- Pterostichus minor (Gyllenhal, 1827)
- Pterostichus nigrita (Paykull, 1790)
- Pterostichus rhaeticus Heer, 1837/8
- Pterostichus vernalis (Panzer, 1795)
- Pterostichus diligens (Sturm, 1824)
- Pterostichus strenuus (Panzer, 1796)
- Abax parallelepipedus (Piller & Mitterpacher, 1783)
- Abax parallelus (Duftschmid, 1812)

Sphodrini Laporte, 1834

- Platyderus depressus (Audinet-Serville, 1821)
- Synuchus vivalis (Illiger, 1798)
- Calathus rotundicollis Dejean, 1828
- Calathus ambiguus (Paykull, 1790)
- Calathus cinctus Motschulsky, 1850
- Calathus erratus (C. R. Sahlberg, 1827)
- Calathus fuscipes (Goeze, 1777)
- Calathus melanocephalus (Linnaeus, 1758)
- Calathus micropterus (Duftschmid, 1812)
- Calathus mollis (Marsham, 1802)
- Sphodrus leucophthalmus (Linnaeus, 1758)
- Laemostenus complanatus (Dejean, 1828)
- Laemostenus terricola (Herbst, 1784)
- Olisthopus rotundatus (Paykull, 1790)
- Oxypselaphus obscurus (Herbst, 1784) ?
- Paranchus albipes (Fabricius, 1796)
- Anchomenus dorsalis (Pontoppidan, 1763)
- Platynus assimilis (Paykull, 1790) ?
- Batenus livens (Gyllenhal, 1810)
- Sericoda quadripunctata (De Geer, 1774)
- Agonum fuliginosum (Panzer, 1809)
- Agonum gracile Sturm, 1824
- Agonum micans Nicolai, 1822
- Agonum piceum (Linnaeus, 1758)
- Agonum scitulum Dejean, 1828
- Agonum thoreyi Dejean, 1828
- Agonum chalconotum Ménétriés, 1832
- Agonum emarginatum (Gyllenhal, 1827)
- Agonum ericeti (Panzer, 1809)
- Agonum gracilipes (Duftschmid, 1812)
- Agonum lugens (Duftschmid, 1812)
- Agonum marginatum (Linnaeus, 1758)
- Agonum muelleri (Herbst, 1784)
- Agonum nigrum Dejean, 1828
- Agonum sexpunctatum (Linnaeus, 1758)
- Agonum versutum Sturm, 1824
- Agonum viduum (Panzer, 1796)
- Zabrus tenebrioides (Goeze, 1777)
- Amara plebeja (Gyllenhal, 1810)
- Amara strenua Zimmermann, 1832
- Amara aenea (De Geer, 1774)
- Amara anthobia Villa & Villa, 1833
- Amara communis (Panzer, 1797)
- Amara convexior Stephens, 1828
- Amara curta Dejean, 1828
- Amara eurynota (Panzer, 1796)
- Amara famelica Zimmermann, 1832
- Amara familiaris (Duftschmid, 1812)
- Amara lucida (Duftschmid, 1812)
- Amara lunicollis Schiødte, 1837
- Amara montivaga Sturm, 1825
- Amara nitida Sturm, 1825
- Amara ovata (Fabricius, 1792)
- Amara similata (Gyllenhal, 1810)
- Amara spreta Dejean, 1831
- Amara tibialis (Paykull, 1798)
- Amara bifrons (Gyllenhal, 1810)
- Amara cursitans (Zimmermann, 1832)
- Amara fusca Dejean, 1828
- Amara infima (Duftschmid, 1812)
- Amara praetermissa (C. R. Sahlberg, 1827)
- Amara quenseli (Schönherr, 1806)
- Amara apricaria (Paykull, 1790)
- Amara consularis (Duftschmid, 1812)
- Amara fulva (O. F. Müller, 1776)
- Amara equestris (Duftschmid, 1812)
- Curtonotus alpinus (Paykull, 1790)
- Curtonotus aulicus (Panzer, 1796)
- Curtonotus convexiusculus (Marsham, 1802)

Harpalini Bonelli, 1810

- Harpalus calceatus (Duftschmid, 1812)
- Harpalus griseus (Panzer, 1797)
- Harpalus rufipes (De Geer, 1774)
- Harpalus affinis (Schrank, 1781)
- Harpalus anxius (Duftschmid, 1812)
- Harpalus attenuatus Stephens, 1828
- Harpalus cupreus Dejean, 1829
- Harpalus dimidiatus (Rossi, 1790)
- Harpalus froelichii Sturm, 1818
- Harpalus honestus (Duftschmid, 1812)
- Harpalus laevipes Zetterstedt, 1828
- Harpalus latus (Linnaeus, 1758)
- Harpalus neglectus Audinet-Serville, 1821
- Harpalus pumilus Sturm, 1818
- Harpalus rubripes (Duftschmid, 1812)
- Harpalus rufipalpis Sturm, 1818
- Harpalus serripes (Quensel in Schönherr, 1806)
- Harpalus servus (Duftschmid, 1812)
- Harpalus smaragdinus (Duftschmid, 1812)
- Harpalus tardus (Panzer, 1796)
- Harpalus melancholicus Dejean, 1829
- Harpalus tenebrosus Dejean, 1829
- Ophonus ardosiacus Lutshnik, 1922
- Ophonus azureus (Fabricius, 1775)
- Ophonus sabulicola (Panzer, 1796)
- Ophonus stictus Stephens, 1828
- Ophonus cordatus (Duftschmid, 1812)
- Ophonus laticollis Mannerheim, 1825
- Ophonus melletii (Heer, 1837/8)
- Ophonus parallelus (Dejean, 1829)
- Ophonus puncticeps Stephens, 1828
- Ophonus puncticollis (Paykull, 1798)
- Ophonus rufibarbis (Fabricius, 1792)
- Ophonus rupicola (Sturm, 1818)
- Ophonus schaubergerianus (Puel, 1937)
- Ophonus subsinuatus Rey, 1886
- Anisodactylus binotatus (Fabricius, 1787)
- Anisodactylus nemorivagus (Duftschmid, 1812)
- Anisodactylus poeciloides (Stephens, 1828)
- Diachromus germanus (Linnaeus, 1758)
- Scybalicus oblongiusculus (Dejean, 1829)
- Dicheirotrichus gustavii Crotch, 1871
- Dicheirotrichus obsoletus (Dejean, 1829)
- Trichocellus cognatus (Gyllenhal, 1827)
- Trichocellus placidus (Gyllenhal, 1827)
- Bradycellus caucasicus (Chaudoir, 1846)
- Bradycellus csikii Laczó, 1912
- Bradycellus distinctus (Dejean, 1829)
- Bradycellus harpalinus (Audinet-Serville, 1821)
- Bradycellus ruficollis (Stephens, 1828)
- Bradycellus sharpi Joy, 1912
- Bradycellus verbasci (Duftschmid, 1812)
- Stenolophus comma (Fabricius, 1775)
- Stenolophus mixtus (Herbst, 1784)
- Stenolophus skrimshiranus Stephens, 1828
- Stenolophus teutonus (Schrank, 1781)
- Acupalpus brunnipes (Sturm, 1825)
- Acupalpus dubius Schilsky, 1888
- Acupalpus elegans (Dejean, 1829)
- Acupalpus exiguus Dejean, 1829
- Acupalpus flavicollis (Sturm, 1825)
- Acupalpus maculatus (Schaum, 1860)
- Acupalpus meridianus (Linnaeus, 1761)
- Acupalpus parvulus (Sturm, 1825)
- Anthracus consputus (Duftschmid, 1812)
- Chlaenius nigricornis (Fabricius, 1787)
- Chlaenius nitidulus (Schrank, 1781)
- Chlaenius tristis (Schaller, 1783)
- Chlaenius vestitus (Paykull, 1790)
- Callistus lunatus (Fabricius, 1775)

Oodini LaFerté-Sénectère, 1851

- Oodes helopioides (Fabricius, 1792)

Licinini Bonelli, 1810

- Licinus depressus (Paykull, 1790)
- Licinus punctatulus (Fabricius, 1792)
- Badister bullatus (Schrank, 1798)
- Badister meridionalis Puel, 1925
- Badister unipustulatus Bonelli, 1813
- Badister sodalis (Duftschmid, 1812)
- Badister collaris Motschulsky, 1844
- Badister dilatatus Chaudoir, 1837
- Badister peltatus (Panzer, 1797)

Panagaeini Bonelli, 1810

- Panagaeus bipustulatus (Fabricius, 1775)
- Panagaeus cruxmajor (Linnaeus, 1758)

Perigonini Horn, 1881

- Perigona nigriceps (Dejean, 1831)

Masoreini Chaudoir, 1870

- Masoreus wetterhallii (Gyllenhal, 1813)
- Lebia chlorocephala (J. Hoffmann, 1803)
- Lebia cyanocephala (Linnaeus, 1758)
- Lebia cruxminor (Linnaeus, 1758)
- Lebia marginata (Geoffroy in Fourcroy, 1785)
- Lebia scapularis (Geoffroy in Fourcroy, 1785)
- Demetrias imperialis (Germar, 1824)
- Demetrias atricapillus (Linnaeus, 1758)
- Demetrias monostigma Samouelle, 1819
- Cymindis axillaris (Fabricius, 1794)
- Cymindis macularis Mannerheim in Fischer von Waldheim, 1824
- Cymindis vaporariorum (Linnaeus, 1758)
- Paradromius linearis (Olivier, 1795)
- Paradromius longiceps (Dejean, 1826)
- Dromius agilis (Fabricius, 1787)
- Dromius angustus Brullé, 1834
- Dromius meridionalis Dejean, 1825
- Dromius quadrimaculatus (Linnaeus, 1758)
- Calodromius spilotus (Illiger, 1798)
- Philorhizus melanocephalus (Dejean, 1825)
- Philorhizus notatus (Stephens, 1827)
- Philorhizus quadrisignatus (Dejean, 1825)
- Philorhizus sigma (Rossi, 1790)
- Philorhizus vectensis (Rye, 1873)
- Microlestes maurus (Sturm, 1827)
- Microlestes minutulus (Goeze, 1777)
- Lionychus quadrillum (Duftschmid, 1812)
- Syntomus foveatus (Geoffroy in Fourcroy, 1785)
- Syntomus obscuroguttatus (Duftschmid, 1812)
- Syntomus truncatellus (Linnaeus, 1761)

Odacanthini Laporte, 1834

- Odacantha melanura (Linnaeus, 1767)

Dryptini Schaum, 1857

- Drypta dentata (Rossi, 1790)
- Polistichus connexus (Geoffroy in Fourcroy, 1785)
