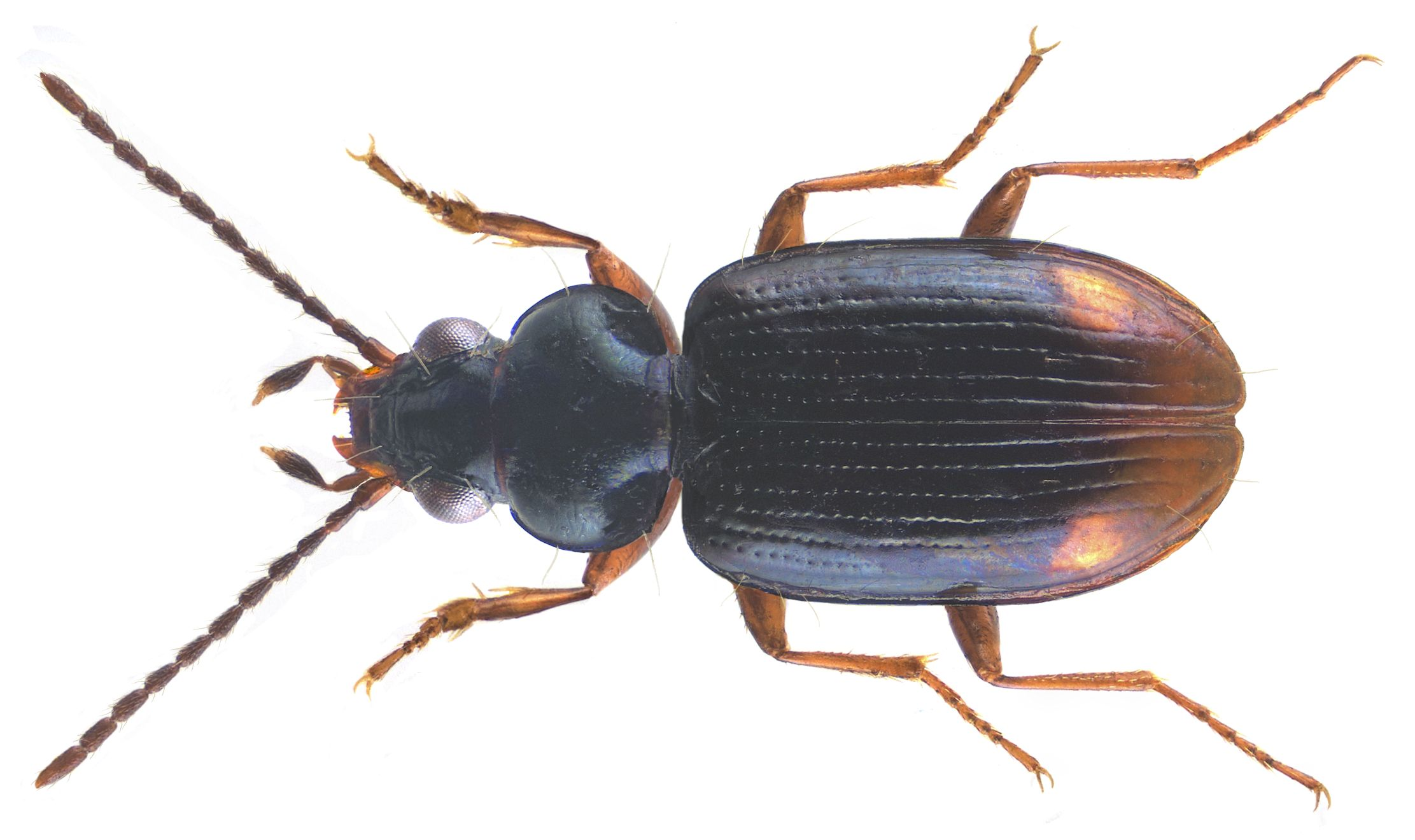

Scientific classification
- Kingdom: Animalia
- Phylum: Arthropoda
- Clade: Pancrustacea
- Class: Insecta
- Order: Coleoptera
- Suborder: Adephaga
- Family: Carabidae
- Genus: Bembidion
- Species: B. guttula

Binomial name
- Bembidion guttula (Fabricius, 1792)

= Bembidion guttula =

Species of beetle

Bembidion guttula is a species of ground beetle native to Europe.
