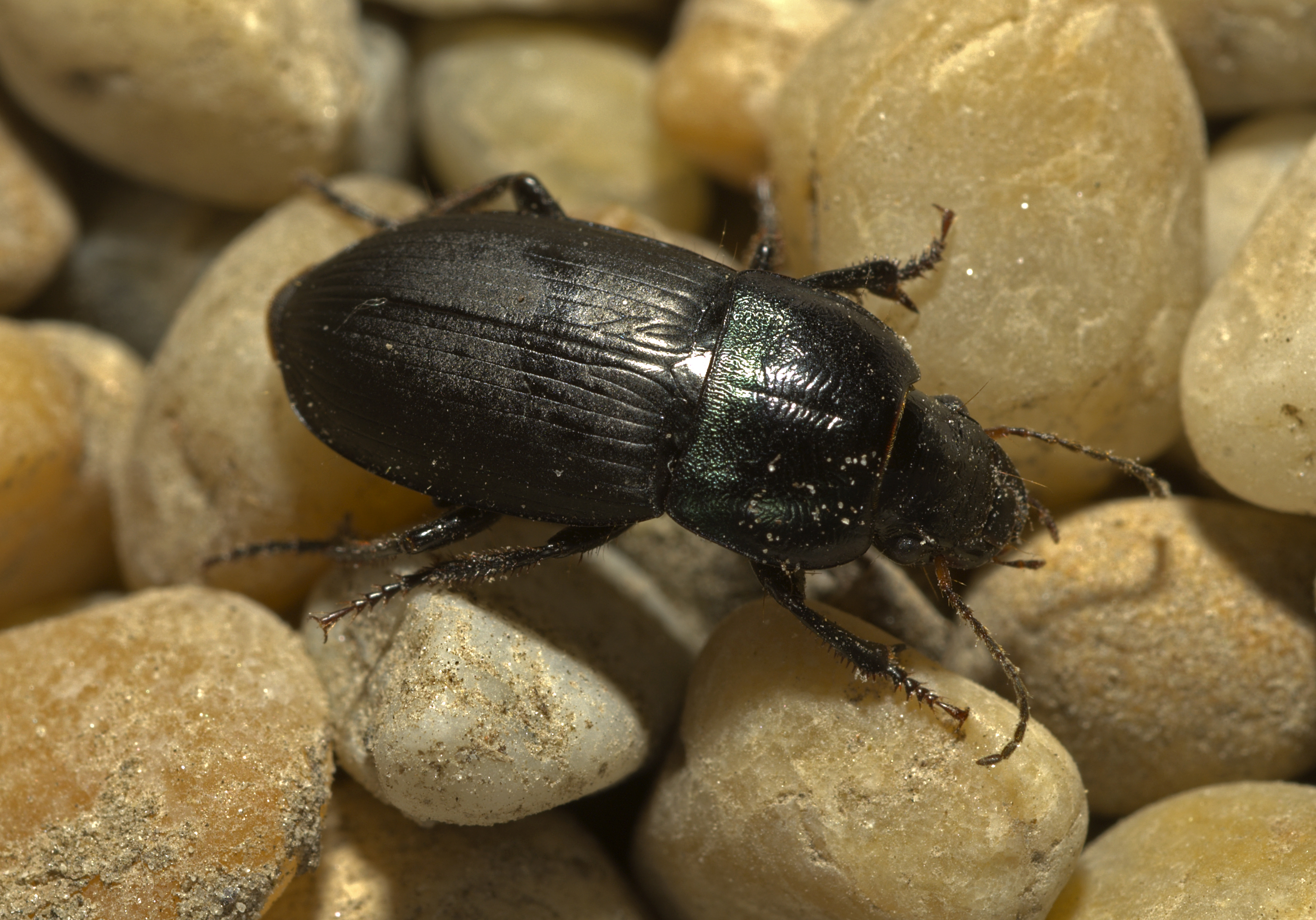

Scientific classification
- Kingdom: Animalia
- Phylum: Arthropoda
- Clade: Pancrustacea
- Class: Insecta
- Order: Coleoptera
- Suborder: Adephaga
- Family: Carabidae
- Genus: Harpalus
- Species: H. dimidiatus

Binomial name
- Harpalus dimidiatus (P. Rossi, 1790)

= Harpalus dimidiatus =

Species of beetle

Harpalus dimidiatus is a species of ground beetle in the subfamily Harpalinae. It was described by P. Rossi in 1790.
