= Harpalus cupreus =

Scientific classification
- Kingdom: Animalia
- Phylum: Arthropoda
- Class: Insecta
- Order: Coleoptera
- Suborder: Adephaga
- Family: Carabidae
- Genus: Harpalus
- Species: H. cupreus

Binomial name
- Harpalus cupreus Dejean, 1829

Synonyms
- Harpalus euchlorus

Species of beetle

Harpalus cupreus is a species of ground beetle in the subfamily Harpalinae. It was described by Pierre François Marie Auguste Dejean in 1829.
