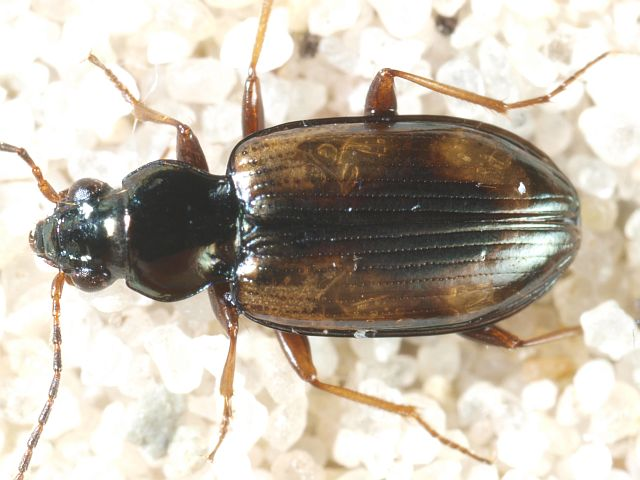

Scientific classification
- Kingdom: Animalia
- Phylum: Arthropoda
- Class: Insecta
- Order: Coleoptera
- Suborder: Adephaga
- Family: Carabidae
- Genus: Bembidion
- Species: B. bruxellense

Binomial name
- Bembidion bruxellense Wesmael, 1835

= Bembidion bruxellense =

Species of beetle

Bembidion bruxellense is a species of ground beetle native to Europe.
