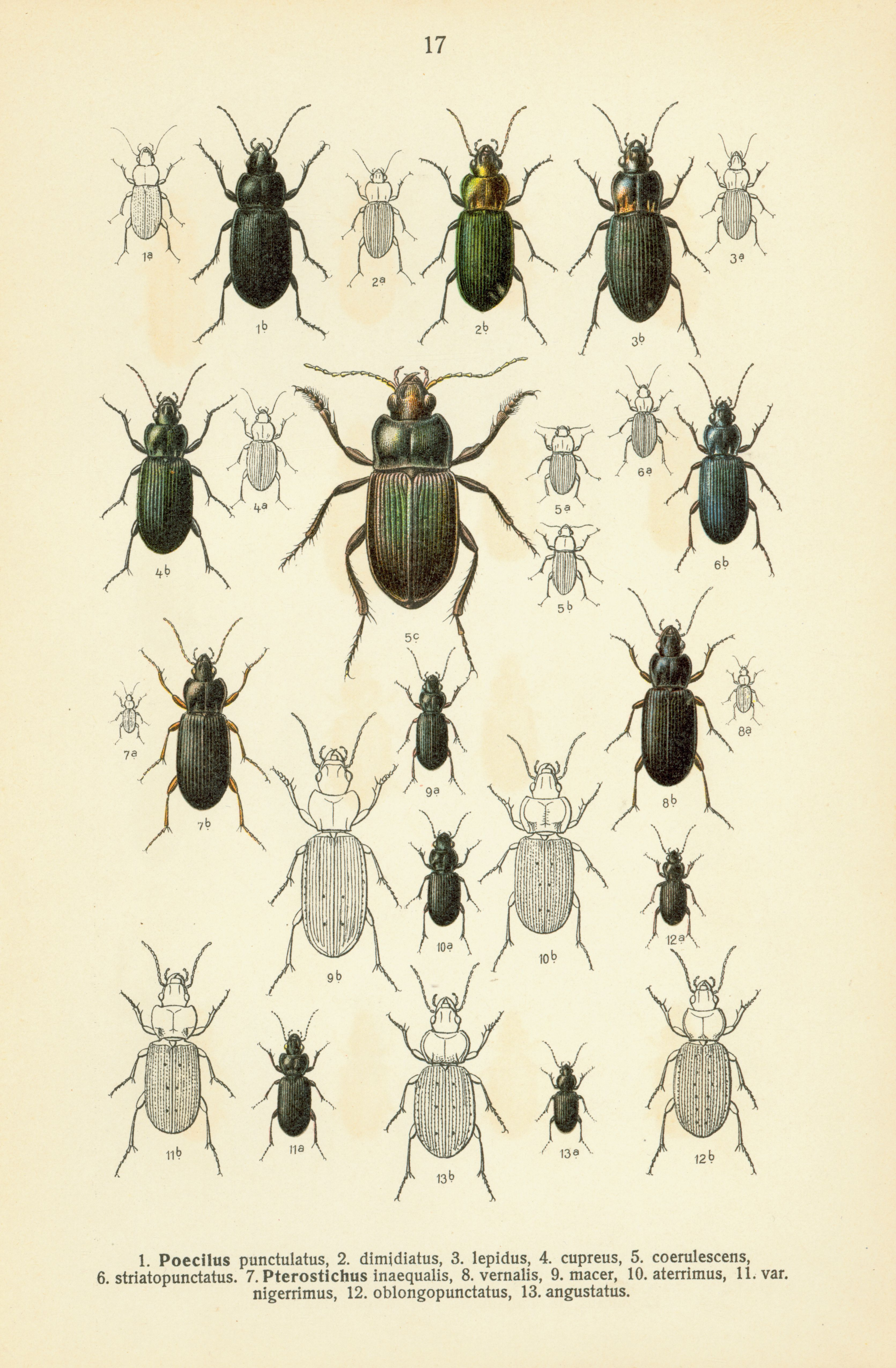

Scientific classification
- Kingdom: Animalia
- Phylum: Arthropoda
- Class: Insecta
- Order: Coleoptera
- Suborder: Adephaga
- Family: Carabidae
- Genus: Pterostichus
- Species: P. aterrimus

Binomial name
- Pterostichus aterrimus (Herbst, 1784)

= Pterostichus aterrimus =

Species of beetle

Pterostichus aterrimus is a species of ground beetle native to Europe.
