= Dyschirius angustatus =

Scientific classification
- Kingdom: Animalia
- Phylum: Arthropoda
- Class: Insecta
- Order: Coleoptera
- Suborder: Adephaga
- Family: Carabidae
- Genus: Dyschirius
- Species: D. angustatus

Binomial name
- Dyschirius angustatus (Ahrens, 1830)

Species of beetle

Dyschirius angustatus is a species of ground beetle in the subfamily Scaritinae. It was described by Ahrens in 1830.
