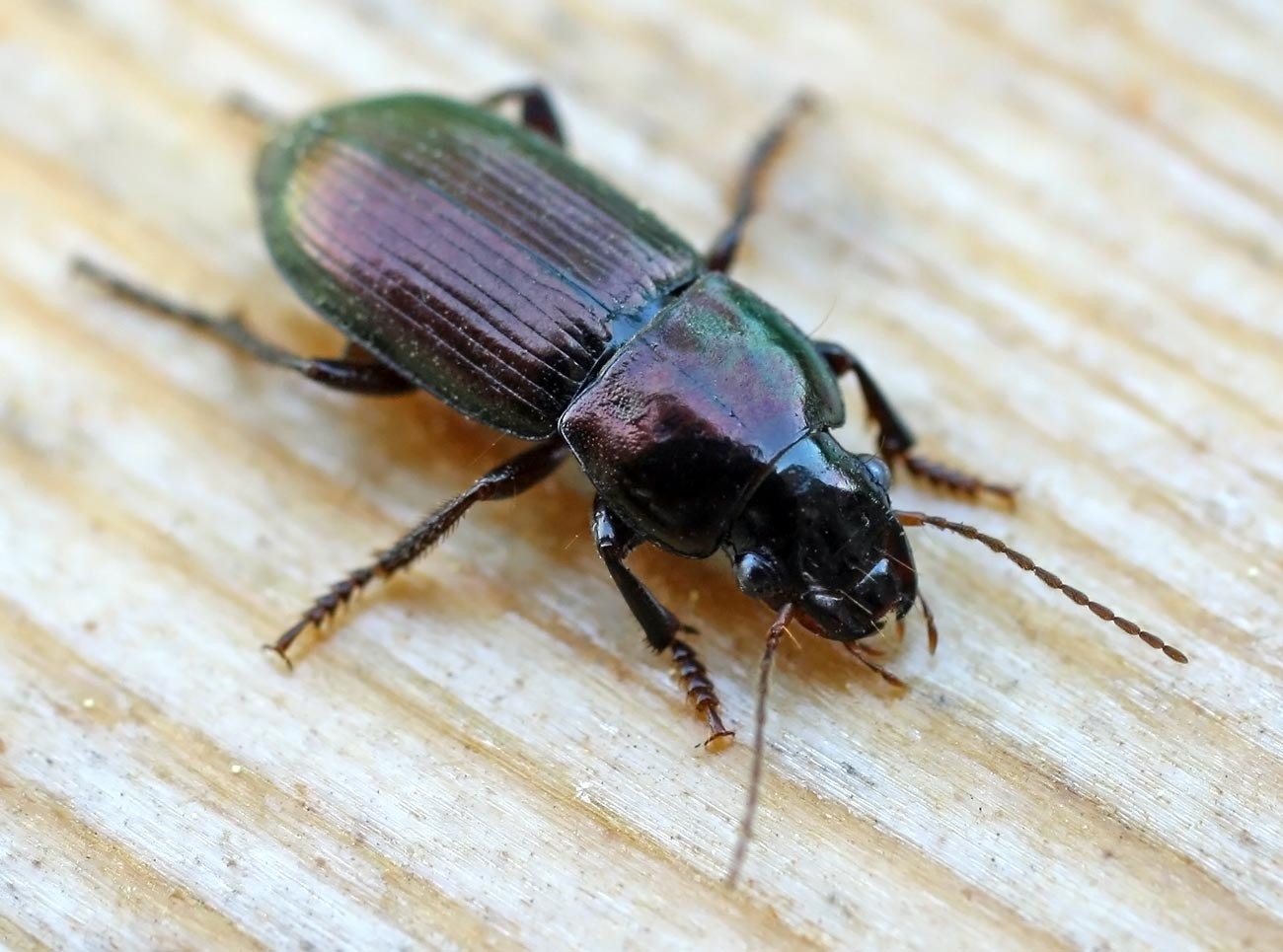

Scientific classification
- Kingdom: Animalia
- Phylum: Arthropoda
- Class: Insecta
- Order: Coleoptera
- Suborder: Adephaga
- Family: Carabidae
- Genus: Harpalus
- Species: H. tardus

Binomial name
- Harpalus tardus Panzer, 1797

Synonyms
- Carabus rufimanus Marsham, 1802

= Harpalus tardus =

Species of beetle

Harpalus tardus is a black-coloured ground beetle in the Harpalinae subfamily that is common in Europe, Siberia, Central Asia and Northern Asia.

== Description and distribution ==
It can be found in Leicestershire and Rutland and is 8–11 millimetres (0.31–0.43 in) long. It likes sandy ground and gravel over which it flies from spring to summer.
