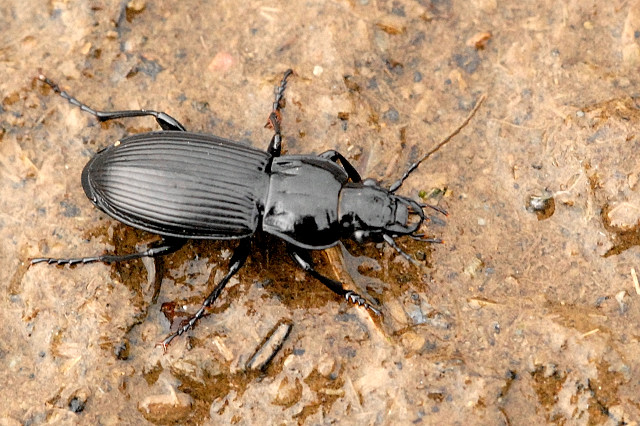

Scientific classification
- Kingdom: Animalia
- Phylum: Arthropoda
- Clade: Pancrustacea
- Class: Insecta
- Order: Coleoptera
- Suborder: Adephaga
- Family: Carabidae
- Subfamily: Pterostichinae
- Tribe: Pterostichini
- Genus: Pterostichus
- Species: P. niger

Binomial name
- Pterostichus niger (Schaller, 1783)

= Pterostichus niger =

Species of beetle

Pterostichus niger is a species of woodland ground beetle in the family Carabidae, found in the Palearctic.

== Subspecies ==
These two subspecies belong to the species Pterostichus niger:

- Pterostichus niger niger (Schaller, 1783)
- Pterostichus niger planipennis (R.F.Sahlberg, 1844)
