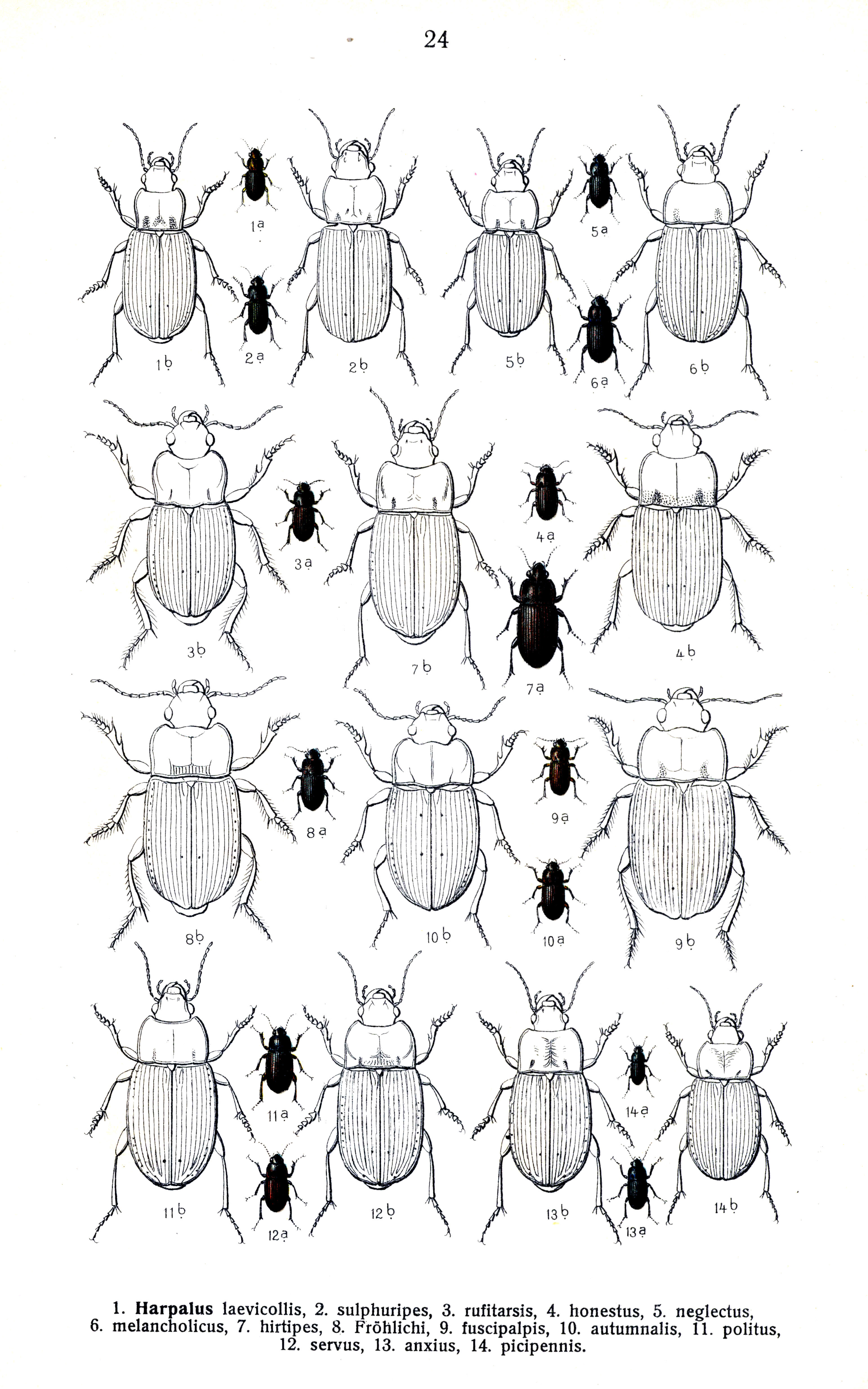

Scientific classification
- Kingdom: Animalia
- Phylum: Arthropoda
- Class: Insecta
- Order: Coleoptera
- Suborder: Adephaga
- Family: Carabidae
- Genus: Harpalus
- Species: H. servus

Binomial name
- Harpalus servus (Duftschmid, 1812)

Synonyms
- Harpalus bucculentus Kraatz, 1874; Harpalus complanatus Sturm, 1818; Harpalus dilatatus Motschulsky, 1844; Harpalus eupatoriae Schauberger, 1932; Harpalus maritimus O. Schneider, 1898

= Harpalus servus =

Species of beetle

Harpalus servus is a species of ground beetle native to Europe, where it can be found in such territories as Austria, Baltic states (except for Estonia), Benelux, Belarus, Bulgaria, Czech Republic, Denmark, Great Britain including the Isle of Man, Hungary, Italy, Moldova, Poland, Romania, Slovakia, Slovenia, Sweden, Ukraine and both southern and central parts of Russia. Its presence in Spain and Switzerland is considered to be doubtful. It is also found in Kazakhstan.
