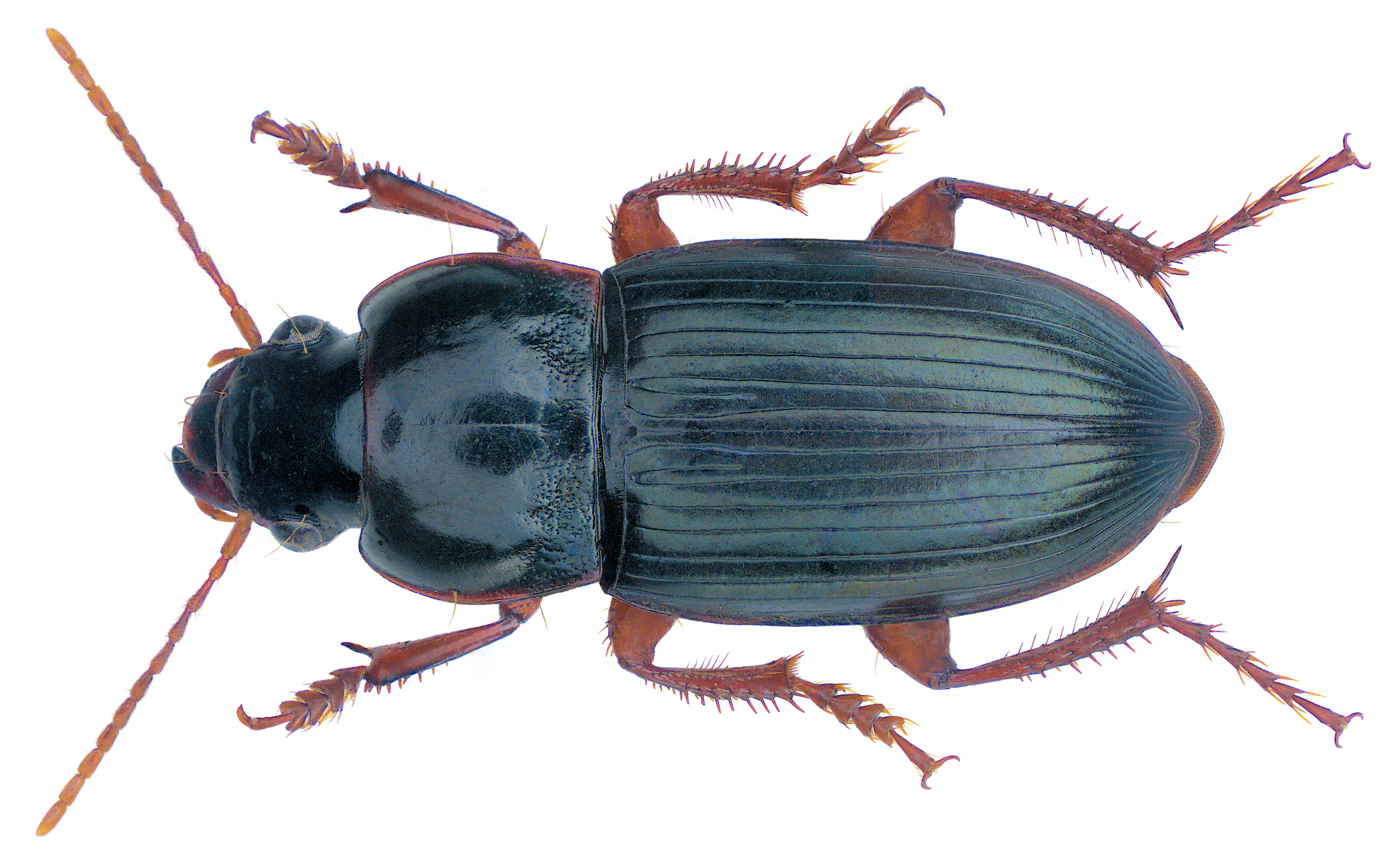

Scientific classification
- Kingdom: Animalia
- Phylum: Arthropoda
- Clade: Pancrustacea
- Class: Insecta
- Order: Coleoptera
- Suborder: Adephaga
- Family: Carabidae
- Genus: Harpalus
- Species: H. smaragdinus

Binomial name
- Harpalus smaragdinus (Duftschmid, 1812)

Synonyms
- Harpalus discoideus Erichsan, 1837; Harpalus discriminatus J. Jacquet, 1942; Harpalus duftschmidii Sturm, 1818; Harpalus perplexus Gyllenhal, 1827; Carabus petisii Duftschmid, 1812; Harpalus reinigi Schaubenger, 1934

= Harpalus smaragdinus =

Species of beetle

Harpalus smaragdinus is a species of ground beetle native to the Palearctic.

== Description ==
The species head is broad at the ocelli. Its mandibles are pointed, with a tiny basal swelling. The species is similar to Harpalus affinis, but has a gradually rounded nasale between teeth, smaller than in Harpalus serripes.
