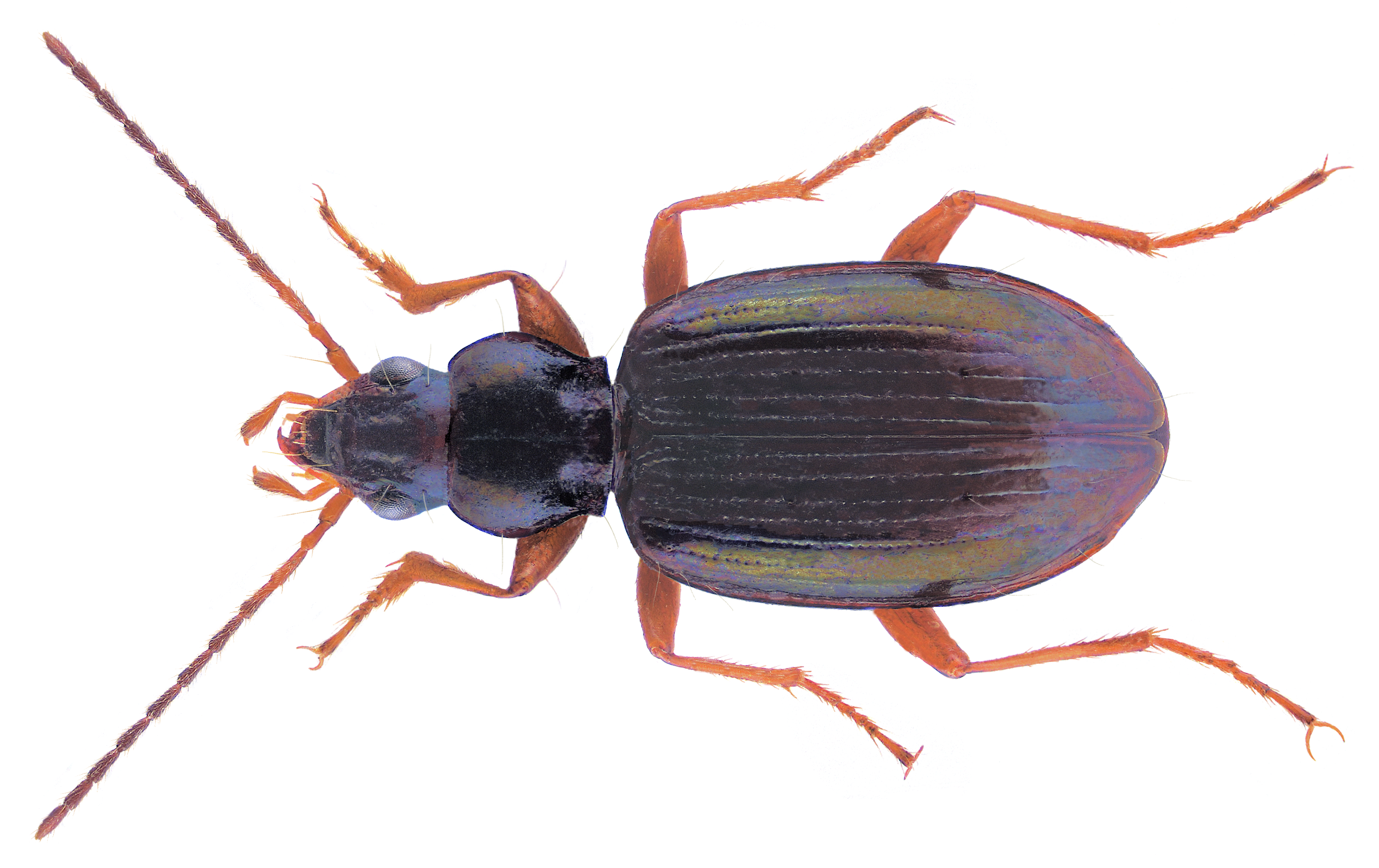

Scientific classification
- Kingdom: Animalia
- Phylum: Arthropoda
- Class: Insecta
- Order: Coleoptera
- Suborder: Adephaga
- Family: Carabidae
- Genus: Bembidion
- Species: B. stephensii

Binomial name
- Bembidion stephensii Crotch, 1866

= Bembidion stephensii =

Species of beetle

Bembidion stephensii is a species of ground beetle in the family Carabidae. It is found in North America and Europe.
