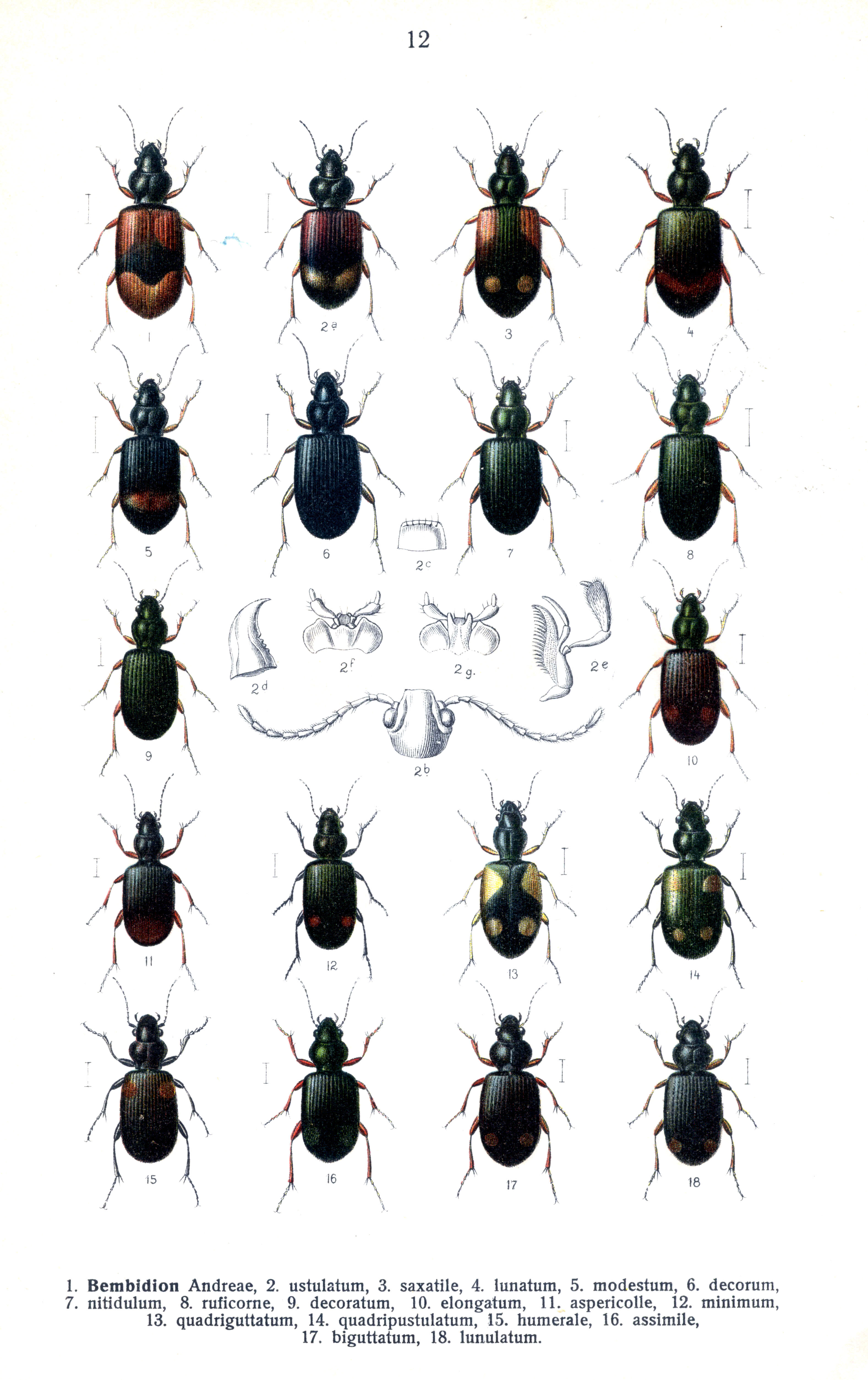

Scientific classification
- Kingdom: Animalia
- Phylum: Arthropoda
- Clade: Pancrustacea
- Class: Insecta
- Order: Coleoptera
- Suborder: Adephaga
- Family: Carabidae
- Genus: Bembidion
- Species: B. minimum

Binomial name
- Bembidion minimum (Fabricius, 1792)

= Bembidion minimum =

Species of beetle

Bembidion minimum is a species of ground beetle native to Europe.
