= Trechus fulvus =

Scientific classification
- Kingdom: Animalia
- Phylum: Arthropoda
- Class: Insecta
- Order: Coleoptera
- Suborder: Adephaga
- Family: Carabidae
- Genus: Trechus
- Species: T. fulvus

Binomial name
- Trechus fulvus Dejean, 1831

Species of beetle

Trechus fulvus is a species of ground beetle in the Trechinae subfamily.

== Description ==
Beetle in length from 5–6 millimetres (0.20–0.24 in). The upper body is yellowish-black. it is common from southwest Norway to the British Isles, including in the area of Carnlough, County Antrim in Ireland.

== Ecology ==
Trechus fulvus lives under stones in rocky seaside environment.
