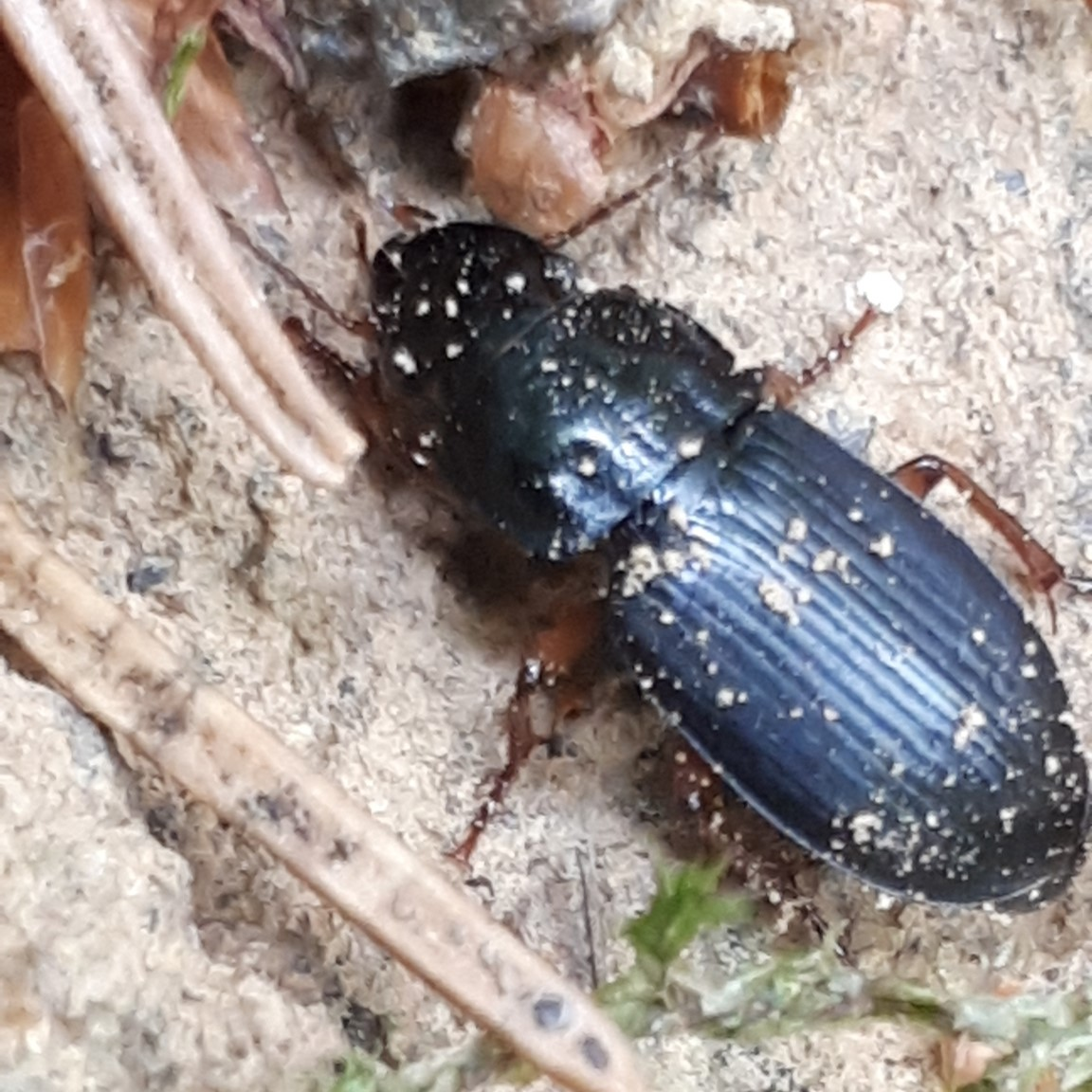

Scientific classification
- Kingdom: Animalia
- Phylum: Arthropoda
- Clade: Pancrustacea
- Class: Insecta
- Order: Coleoptera
- Suborder: Adephaga
- Family: Carabidae
- Genus: Harpalus
- Species: H. laevipes

Binomial name
- Harpalus laevipes Zetterstedt, 1828

Synonyms
- Harpalus ainus Habu & Baba, 1963; Harpalus alienus LeConte, 1879; Harpalus baergi Csiki, 1932; Harpalus cascadiensis Hatch, 1949; Harpalus egregius Casey, 1914; Harpalus impressipennis Motschulsky, 1844; Harpalus instructus Casey, 1924; Harpalus montivagus Reitter, 1900; Harpalus motschoulskyanus Schauberger, 1928; Harpalus nigripes Letzner, 1885; Harpalus pimalicus Casey, 1914; Harpalus quadripunctatus Dejean, 1829; Harpalus rufimanus LeConte, 1848; Harpalus sachalinensis Matsumura, 1911

= Harpalus laevipes =

Species of beetle

Harpalus laevipes is a species of black coloured phytophagous ground beetle in the subfamily Harpalinae. It is found in Asia and is also common in North America.

== Description ==
The species is 9.5–12 millimetres (0.37–0.47 in) long.

== Habitat and ecology ==
It is found in gravelly moraines and shallow soils. It can also be found under stones, low herbal shrubs and limestone. The species is quite equipped to the mountainous lifestyle. It feeds on Calluna species.
