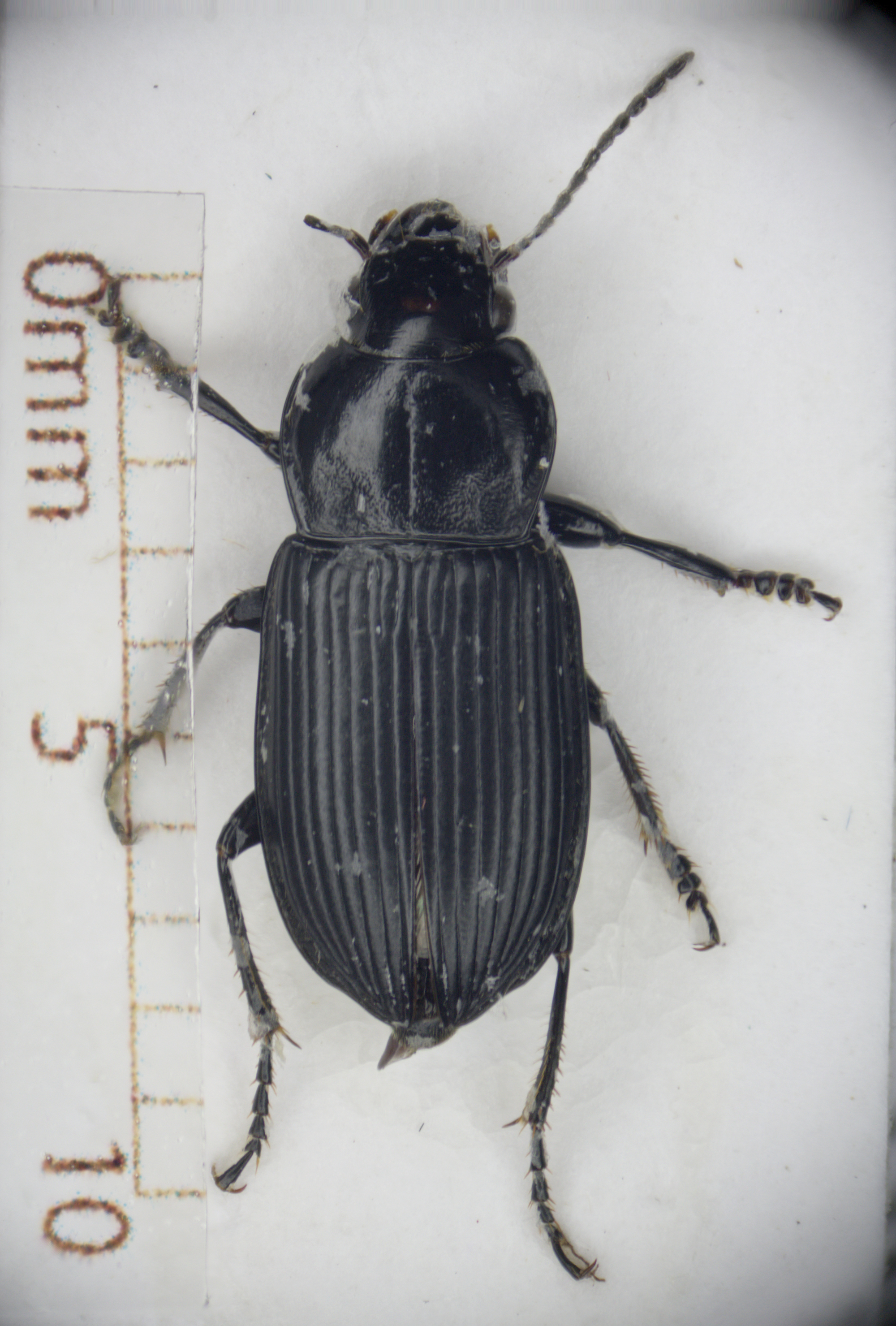

Scientific classification
- Kingdom: Animalia
- Phylum: Arthropoda
- Class: Insecta
- Order: Coleoptera
- Suborder: Adephaga
- Family: Carabidae
- Genus: Harpalus
- Species: H. attenuatus

Binomial name
- Harpalus attenuatus Stephens, 1828

= Harpalus attenuatus =

Species of beetle

Harpalus attenuatus is a species of ground beetle in the subfamily Harpalinae. It was described by Stephens in 1828.
