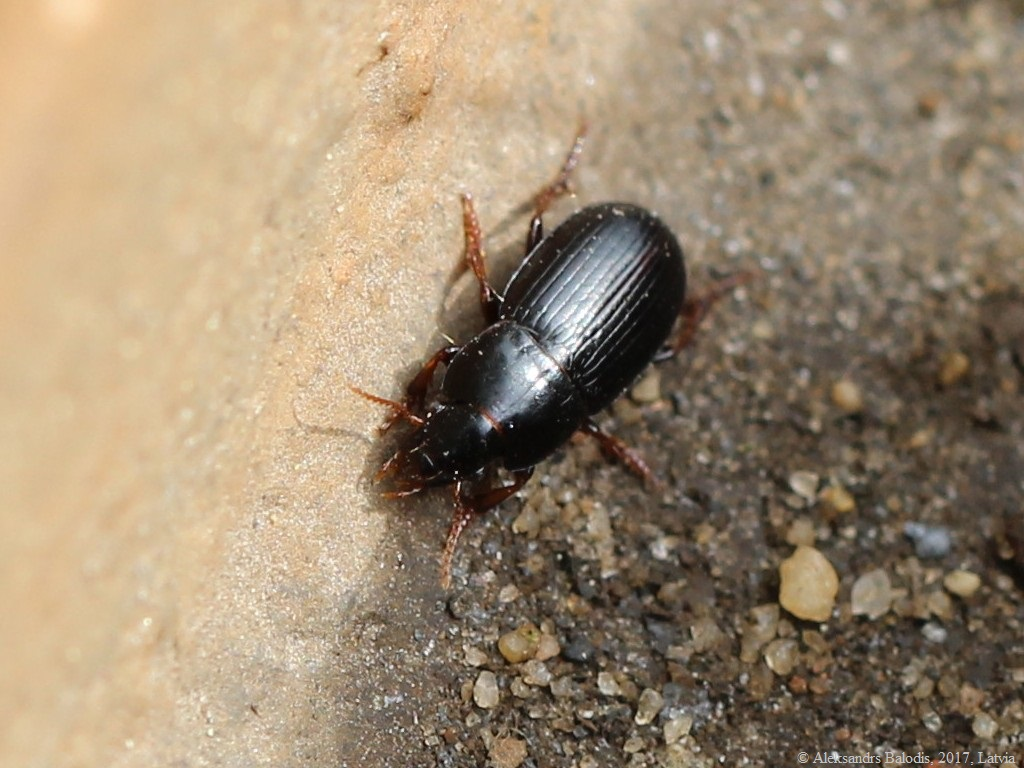

Scientific classification
- Kingdom: Animalia
- Phylum: Arthropoda
- Class: Insecta
- Order: Coleoptera
- Suborder: Adephaga
- Family: Carabidae
- Genus: Harpalus
- Species: H. pumilus

Binomial name
- Harpalus pumilus Sturm, 1818

= Harpalus pumilus =

Species of beetle

Harpalus pumilus is a species of ground beetle in the subfamily Harpalinae. It was described by Sturm in 1818.

Synonyms:

- Harpalus vernalis (Duftschmid, 1812)
