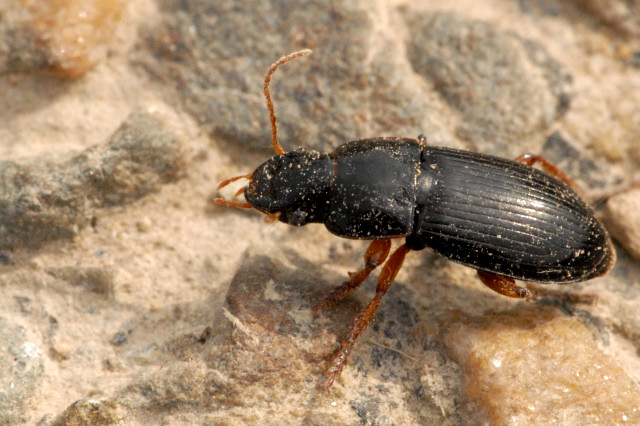

Scientific classification
- Kingdom: Animalia
- Phylum: Arthropoda
- Clade: Pancrustacea
- Class: Insecta
- Order: Coleoptera
- Suborder: Adephaga
- Family: Carabidae
- Genus: Harpalus
- Species: H. griseus

Binomial name
- Harpalus griseus (Panzer, 1796)

= Harpalus griseus =

Species of beetle

Harpalus griseus is a species of ground beetle in the subfamily Harpalinae. It was described by Panzer in 1796.
