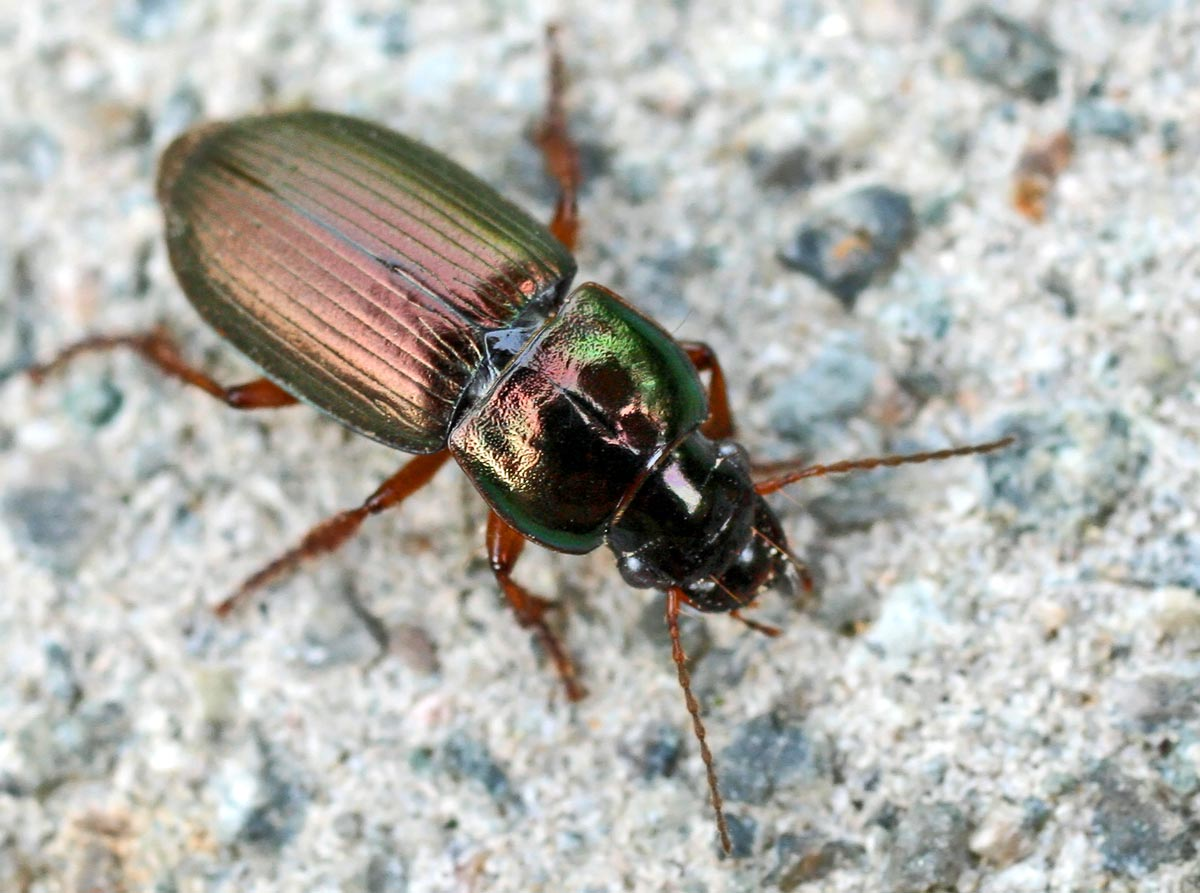

Scientific classification
- Kingdom: Animalia
- Phylum: Arthropoda
- Class: Insecta
- Order: Coleoptera
- Suborder: Adephaga
- Family: Carabidae
- Genus: Harpalus
- Species: H. rubripes

Binomial name
- Harpalus rubripes Duftschmid, 1812

Synonyms
- Harpalus serdicanus Apfelbeck, 1904; Harpalus sobrinus Dejean, 1829

= Harpalus rubripes =

Species of beetle

Harpalus rubripes is a ground beetle in the subfamily Harpalinae that is present in much of Europe, Siberia, Central Asia and Anatolia. It has also, since 1987, been introduced into North America.
