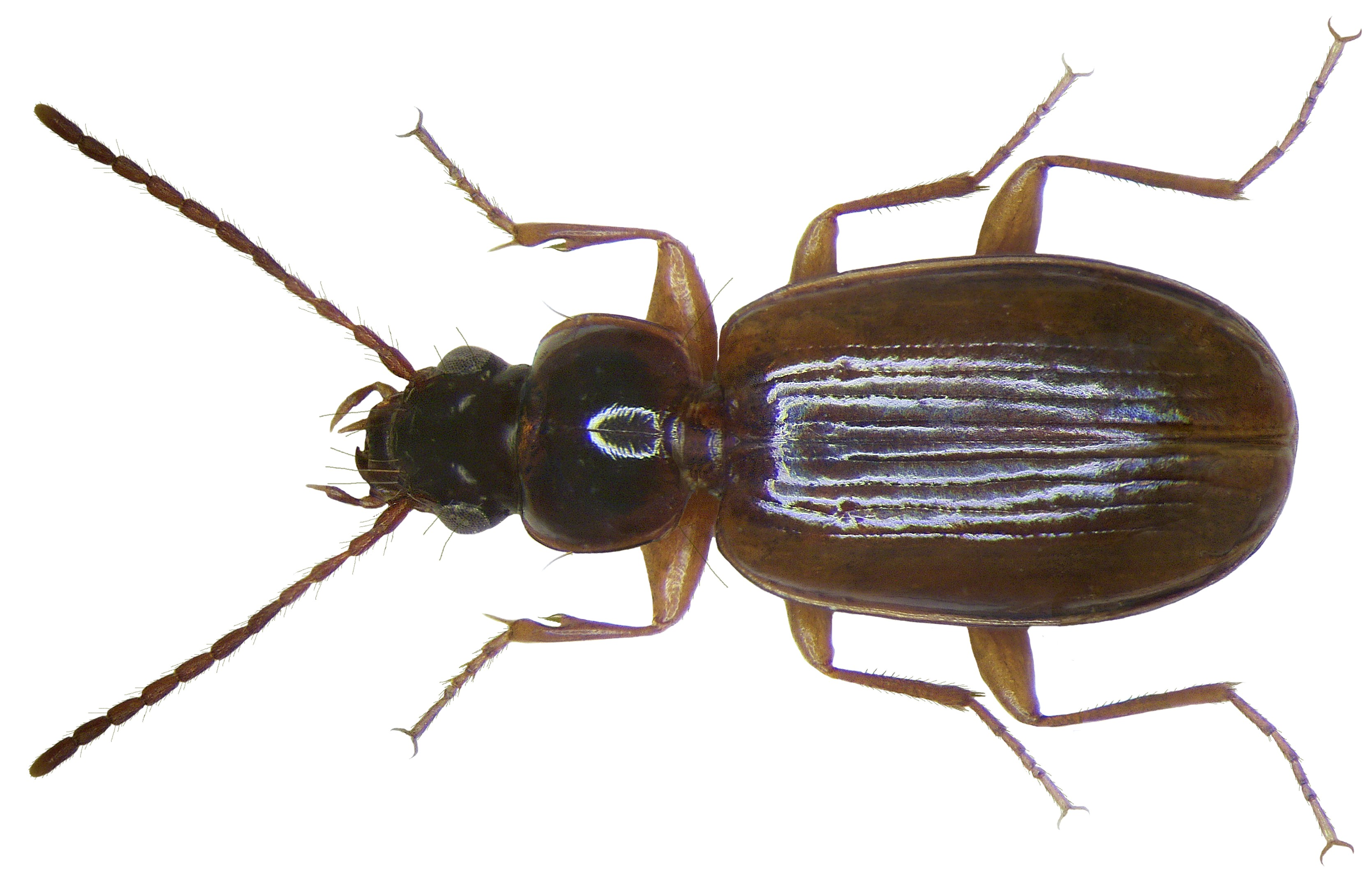

Scientific classification
- Kingdom: Animalia
- Phylum: Arthropoda
- Clade: Pancrustacea
- Class: Insecta
- Order: Coleoptera
- Suborder: Adephaga
- Family: Carabidae
- Genus: Trechus
- Species: T. quadristriatus

Binomial name
- Trechus quadristriatus (Schrank, 1781)

= Trechus quadristriatus =

Species of beetle

Trechus quadristriatus is a beetle species in the family Carabidae, also known as the ground beetles. It is found in North America, Europe, temperate Asia, and Africa.

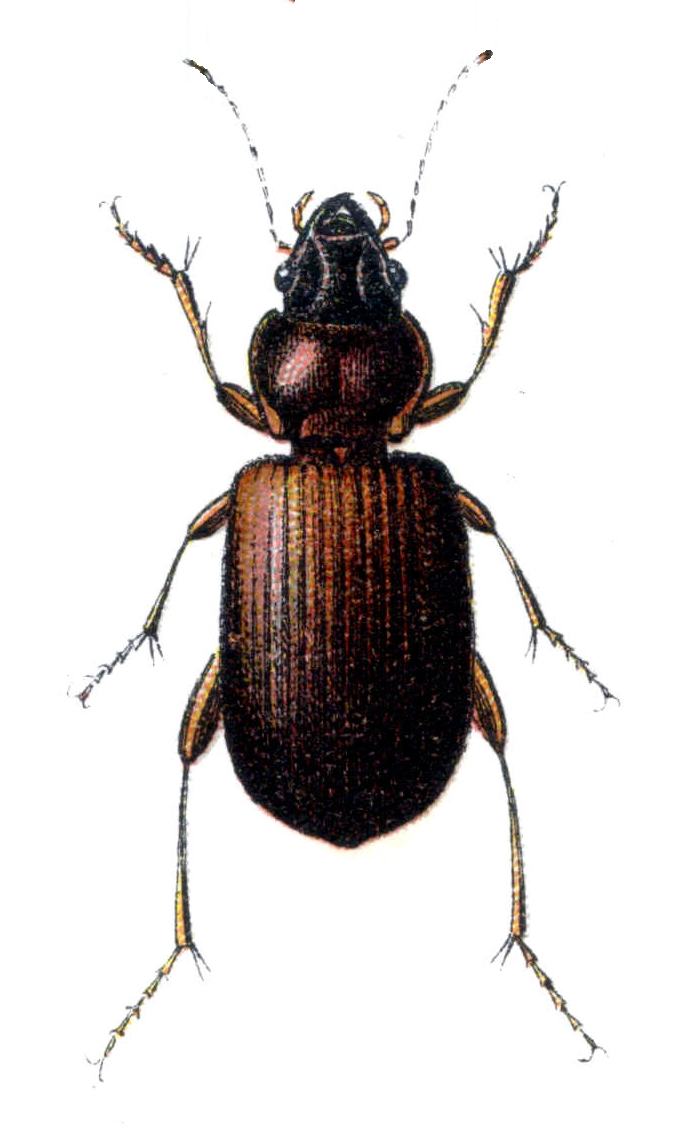

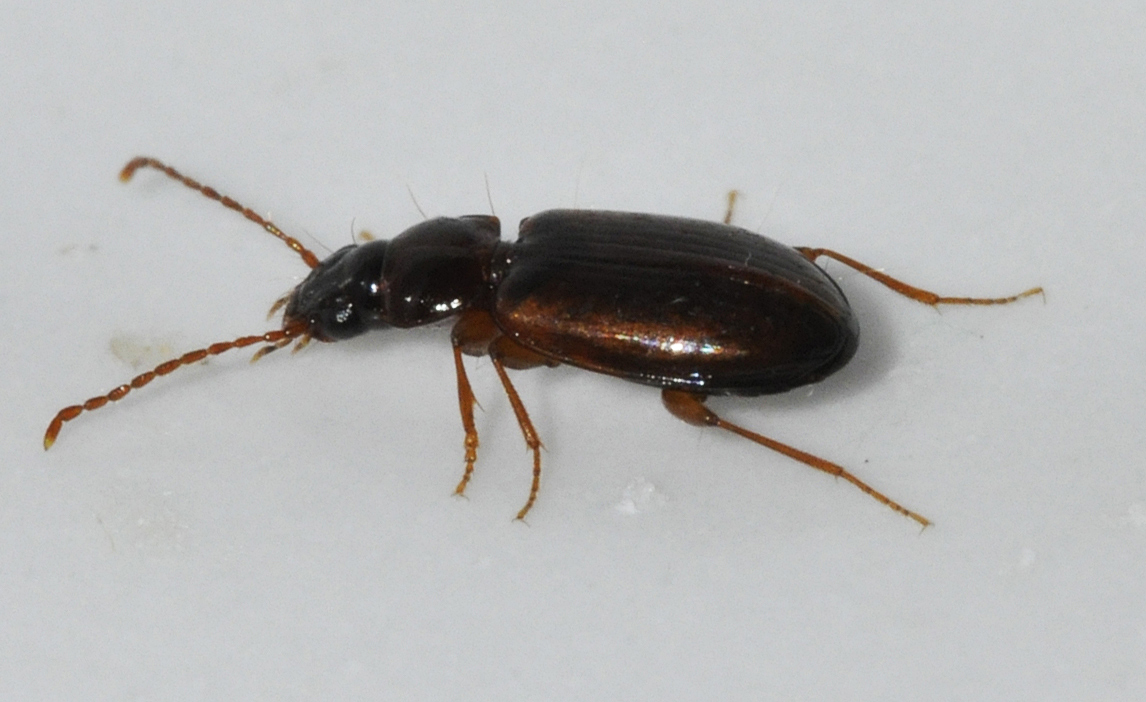
