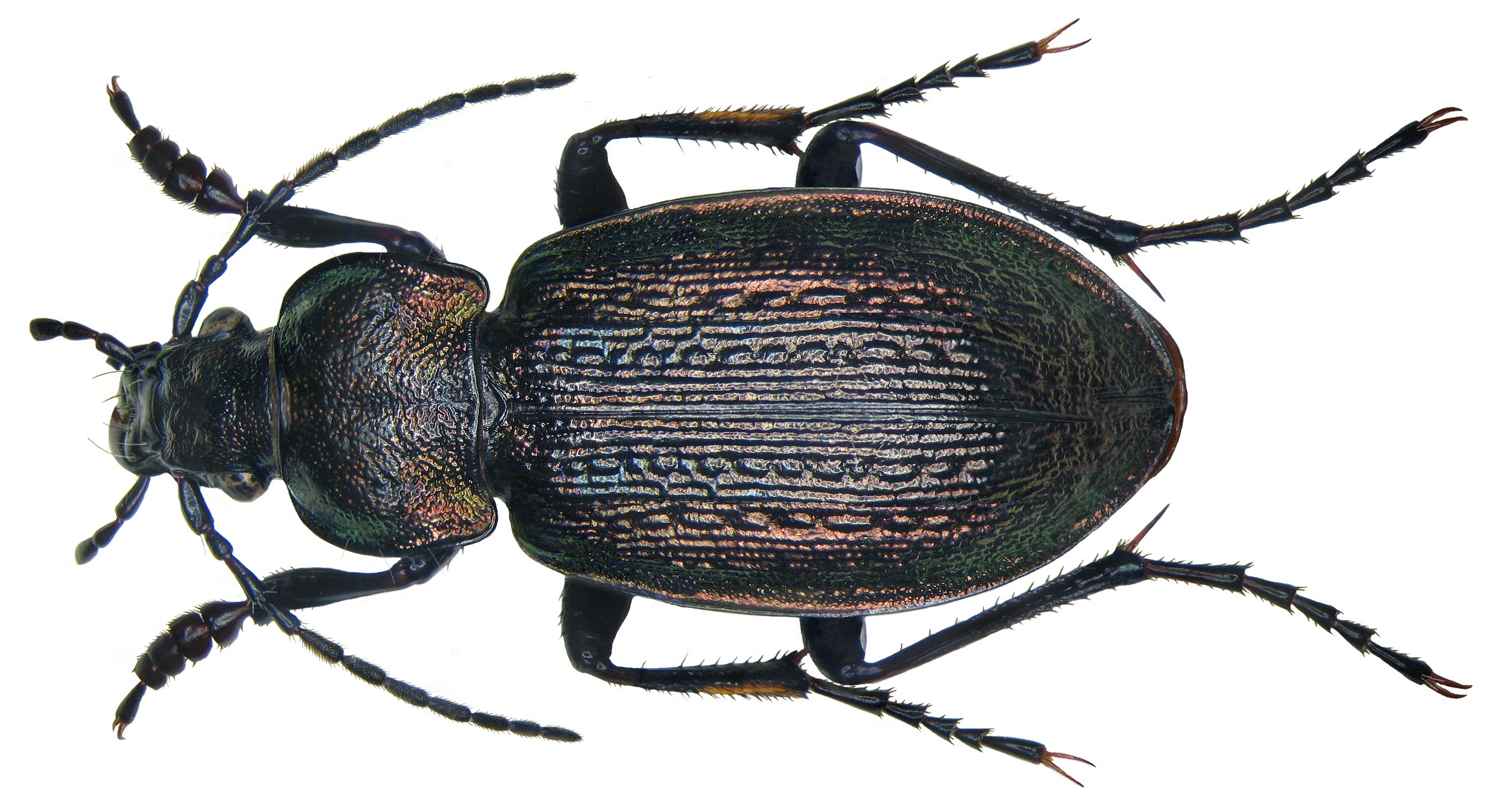
- Carabus arvensis arvensis

Scientific classification
- Kingdom: Animalia
- Phylum: Arthropoda
- Class: Insecta
- Order: Coleoptera
- Suborder: Adephaga
- Family: Carabidae
- Genus: Carabus
- Species: C. arvensis

Binomial name
- Carabus arvensis Herbst, 1784

= Carabus arvensis =

Species of beetle

Carabus arvensis is a species of beetle in family Carabidae. It is found in the Palearctic

== Description ==
A large granulate bronze or green ground beetle with a body length of 16-20mm.

== Distribution ==
Europe north to the Arctic Circle and east across the Palearctic to Siberia, Sakhalin and Japan.

== Biology ==
A montane moorland and blanket bog species in the West. Found in dry woods in the East.
