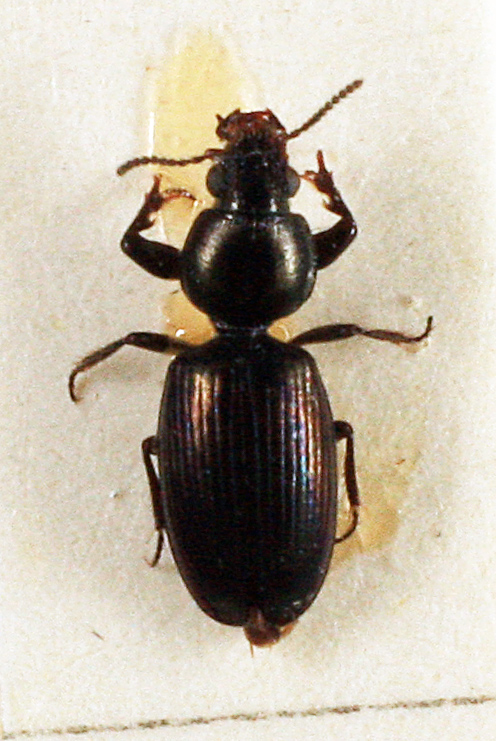
- Dyschirius obscurus

Scientific classification
- Kingdom: Animalia
- Phylum: Arthropoda
- Class: Insecta
- Order: Coleoptera
- Suborder: Adephaga
- Family: Carabidae
- Genus: Dyschirius
- Species: D. obscurus

Binomial name
- Dyschirius obscurus (Gyllenhaal, 1827)

= Dyschirius obscurus =

Species of beetle

Dyschirius obscurus is a species of ground beetle in the subfamily Scaritinae. It was described by Gyllenhaal in 1827.
