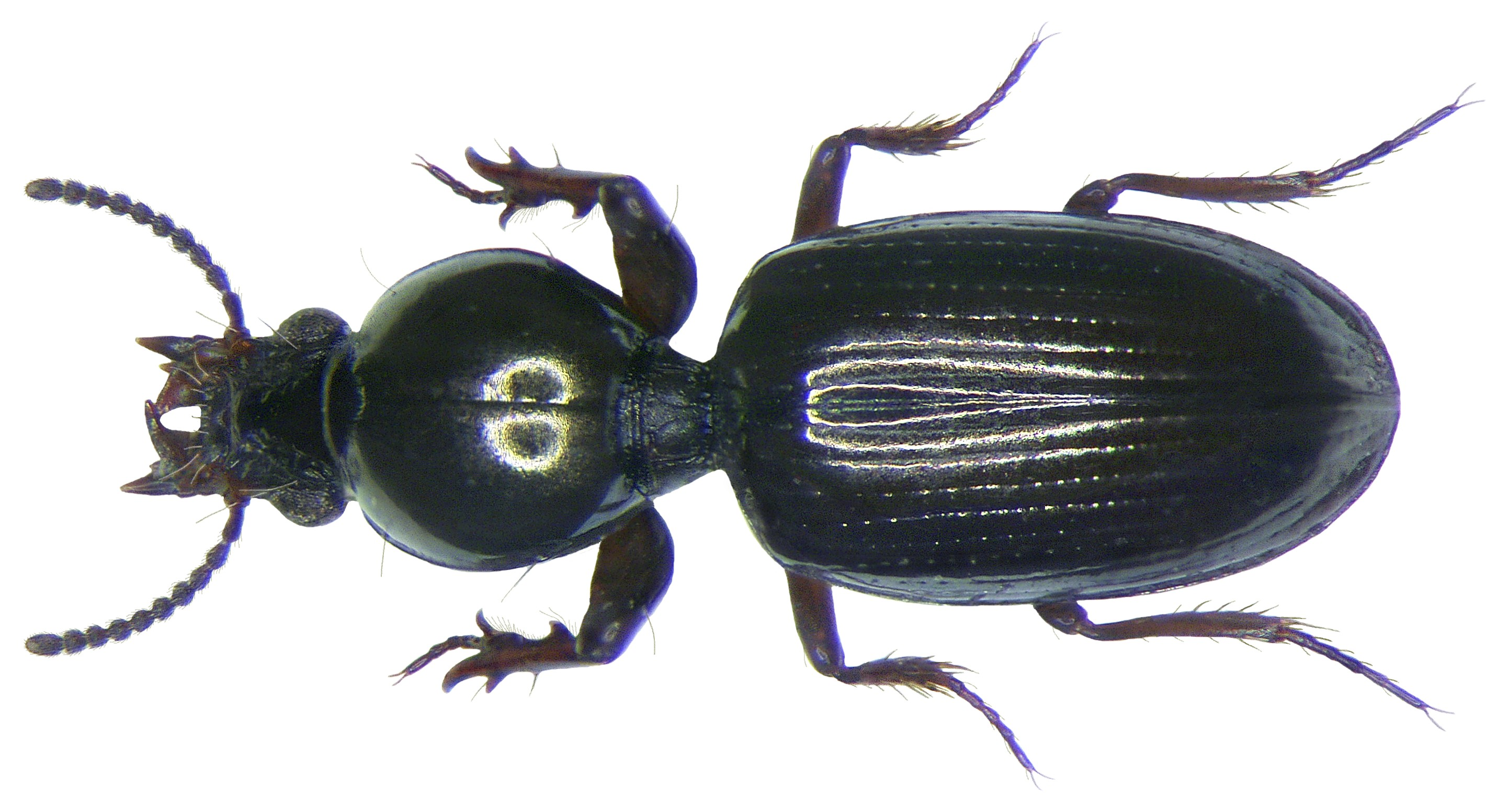

Scientific classification
- Kingdom: Animalia
- Phylum: Arthropoda
- Clade: Pancrustacea
- Class: Insecta
- Order: Coleoptera
- Suborder: Adephaga
- Family: Carabidae
- Genus: Dyschirius
- Species: D. thoracicus

Binomial name
- Dyschirius thoracicus (P. Rossi, 1790)

= Dyschirius thoracicus =

Species of beetle

Dyschirius thoracicus is a species of ground beetle in the subfamily Scaritinae. It was described by P. Rossi in 1790.
