= Aepopsis =

Scientific classification
- Kingdom: Animalia
- Phylum: Arthropoda
- Clade: Pancrustacea
- Class: Insecta
- Order: Coleoptera
- Suborder: Adephaga
- Family: Carabidae
- Tribe: Trechini
- Subtribe: Aepina
- Genus: Aepopsis; Jeannel, 1922
- Species: A. robinii

Binomial name
- Aepopsis robinii (Laboulbène, 1849)

Synonyms
- Aepus robinii

Genus of beetles

Aepopsis is a genus in the beetle family Carabidae. This genus has a single species, Aepopsis robinii.

== Description ==
The beetle's size is 2.5 millimetres (0.098 in). Its colour is yellowish-red.

== Distribution ==
The species can be found along the Mediterranean-Atlantic coast, from the British Isles and France south to the Iberian Peninsula and Morocco. It has also been recorded in Ireland.

== Ecology ==
Aepus robinii lives its entire life cycle in rocky crevices of intertidal zones.
