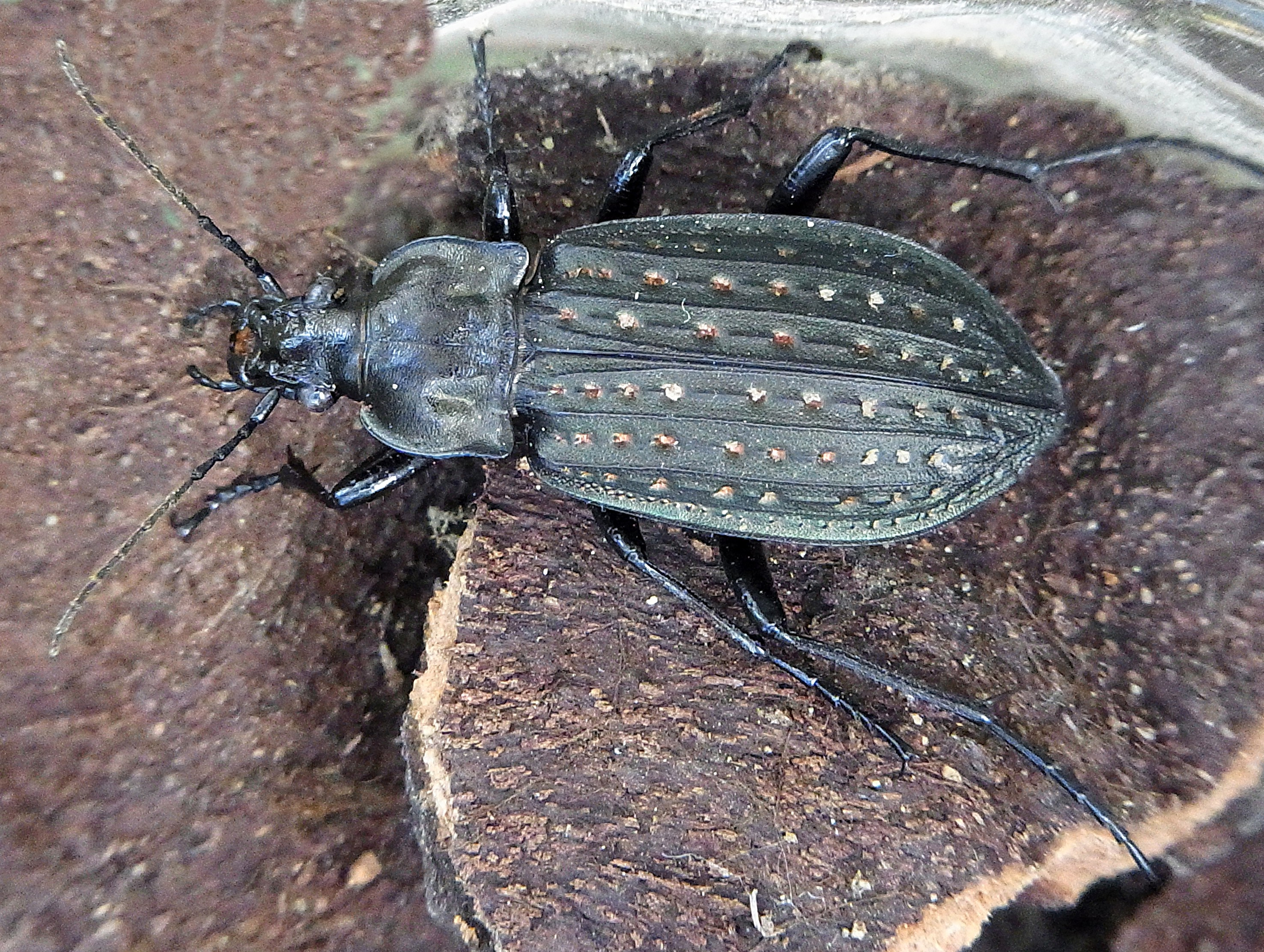

Scientific classification
- Kingdom: Animalia
- Phylum: Arthropoda
- Class: Insecta
- Order: Coleoptera
- Suborder: Adephaga
- Family: Carabidae
- Genus: Carabus
- Species: C. clatratus

Binomial name
- Carabus clatratus Linnaeus, 1761

= Carabus clatratus =

Species of beetle

Carabus clatratus is a species of beetle widespread in the Palearctic.

== Description ==
The beetle reaches a body length of 25 to 36 millimeters and is thus one of the biggest beetle species in Europe. Its body is copper-coloured, greenish or glossy black, and has large, copper or green shimmering pits between distinct secondary ribs on the elytra. The beetle can possess fully developed wings (one of the few fully winged Carabus species) and is also capable of flight. However, this is usually only a small proportion of the populations, most specimens have reduced wings. In Central European and Asian populations, such macropterous animals are probably completely absent.

== Distribution ==
It is found in Europe and East across the Palearctic from Ireland to Korea and Japan and north to the Polar Circle. It is mostly observed in Central Europe, Eastern Europe and Siberia.

== Biology ==
It lives in humid areas such as humid woodland (snag), marshes, bogs and salt marshes. It is diurnal living under or in wet deadwood, mostly willow stumps and in moss mats. It is a predator diving under water to search for snails, small crabs, insects and their larvae, tadpoles and also small fish. It makes a fresh air supply under the wing elytra. The larvae are also able to hunt underwater. It overwinters as an adult to breed in summer. Adults hibernate on drier land.
