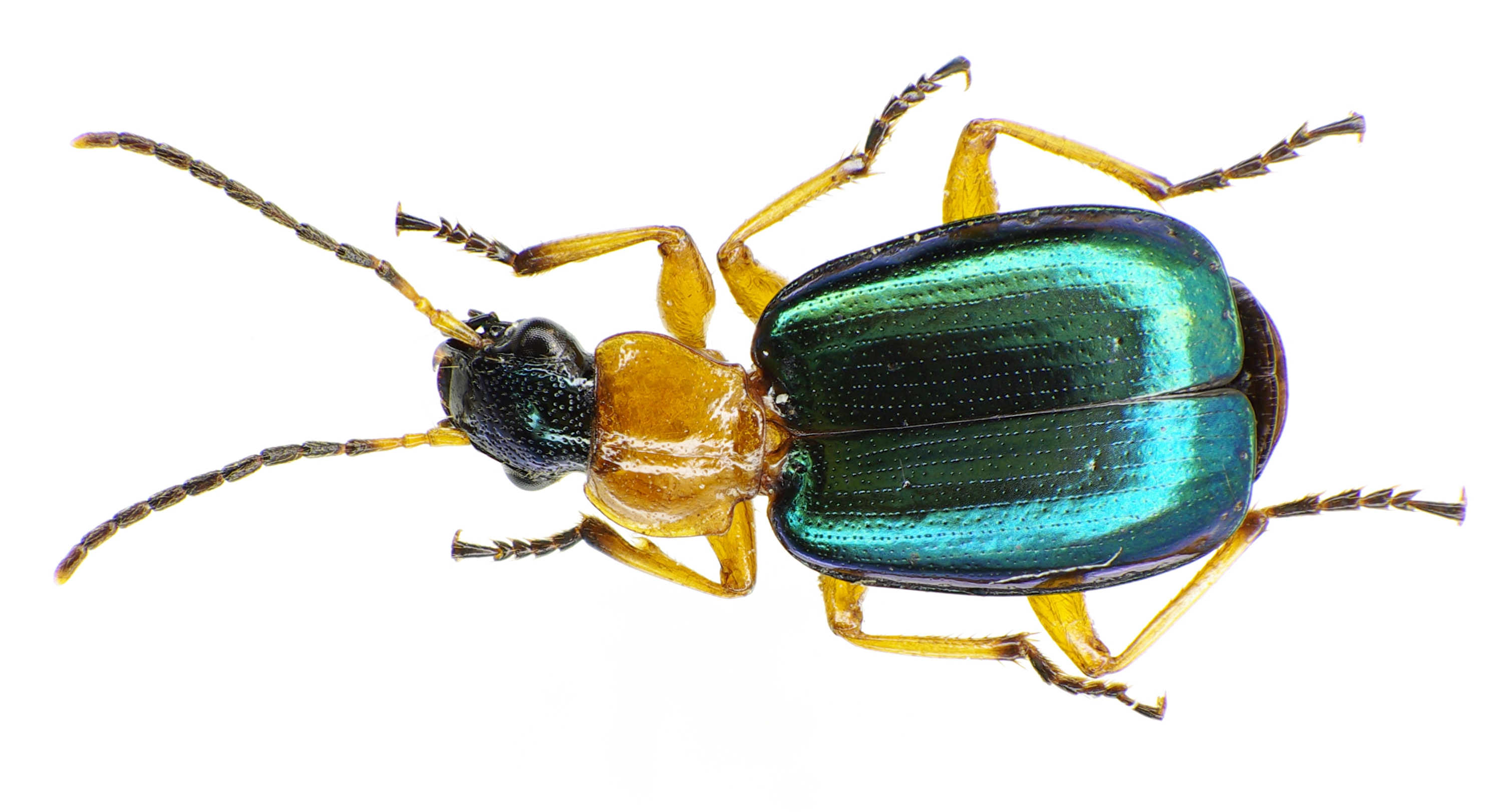

Scientific classification
- Domain: Eukaryota
- Kingdom: Animalia
- Phylum: Arthropoda
- Class: Insecta
- Order: Coleoptera
- Suborder: Adephaga
- Family: Carabidae
- Genus: Lebia
- Species: L. chlorocephala

Binomial name
- Lebia chlorocephala Hoffmannsegg, 1803

= Lebia chlorocephala =

Species of beetle

Lebia chlorocephala is a species of ground beetles in the Harpalinae subfamily.

== Distribution ==
The species is native to most of Europe except extreme North and major part of the South, including European part of Russia, also Western Siberia and parts of Central Asia.
