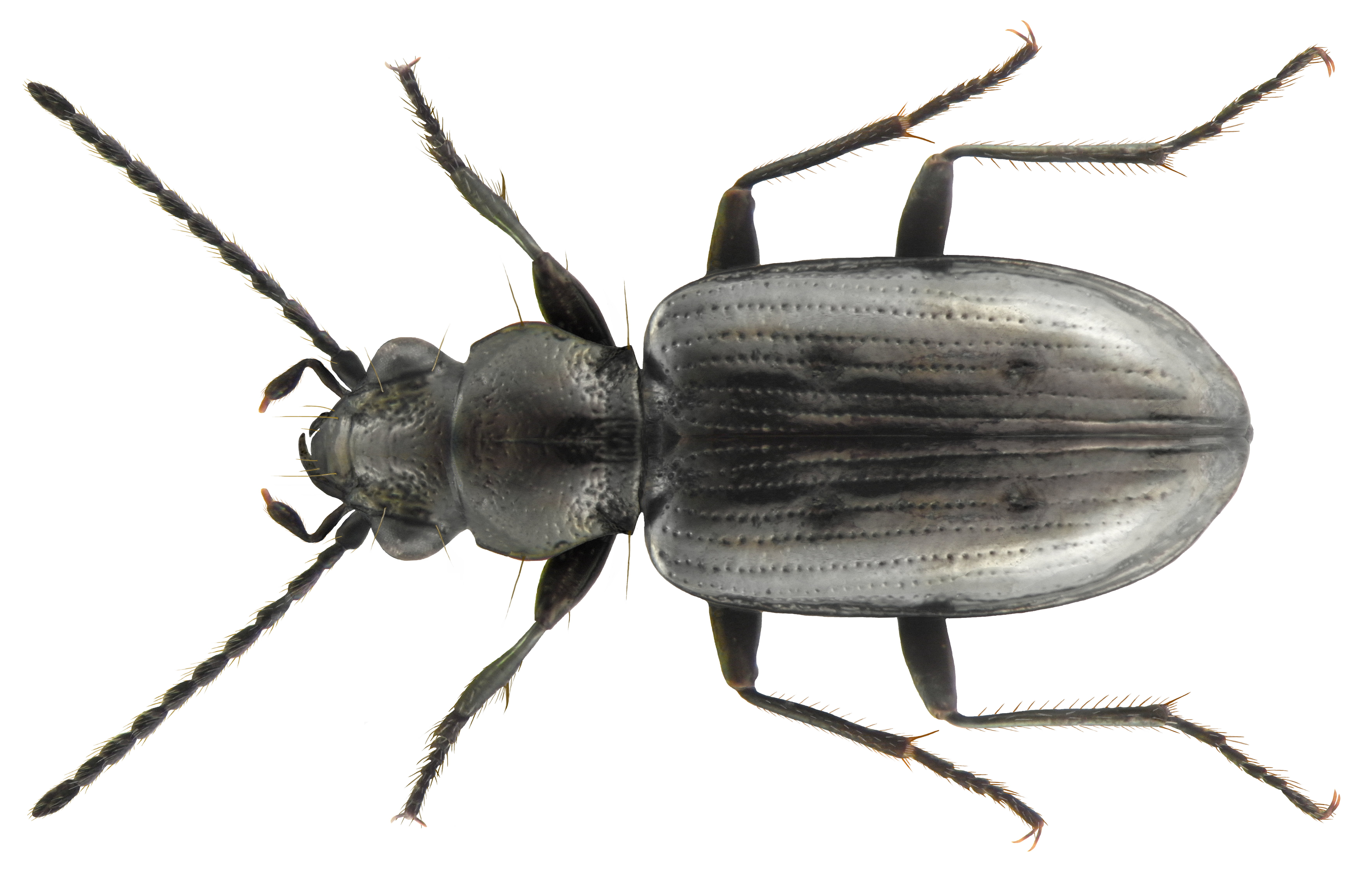

Scientific classification
- Kingdom: Animalia
- Phylum: Arthropoda
- Class: Insecta
- Order: Coleoptera
- Suborder: Adephaga
- Family: Carabidae
- Genus: Bembidion
- Species: B. bipunctatum

Binomial name
- Bembidion bipunctatum (Linnaeus, 1761)

= Bembidion bipunctatum =

Species of beetle

Bembidion bipunctatum is a species of ground beetle native to Europe.
