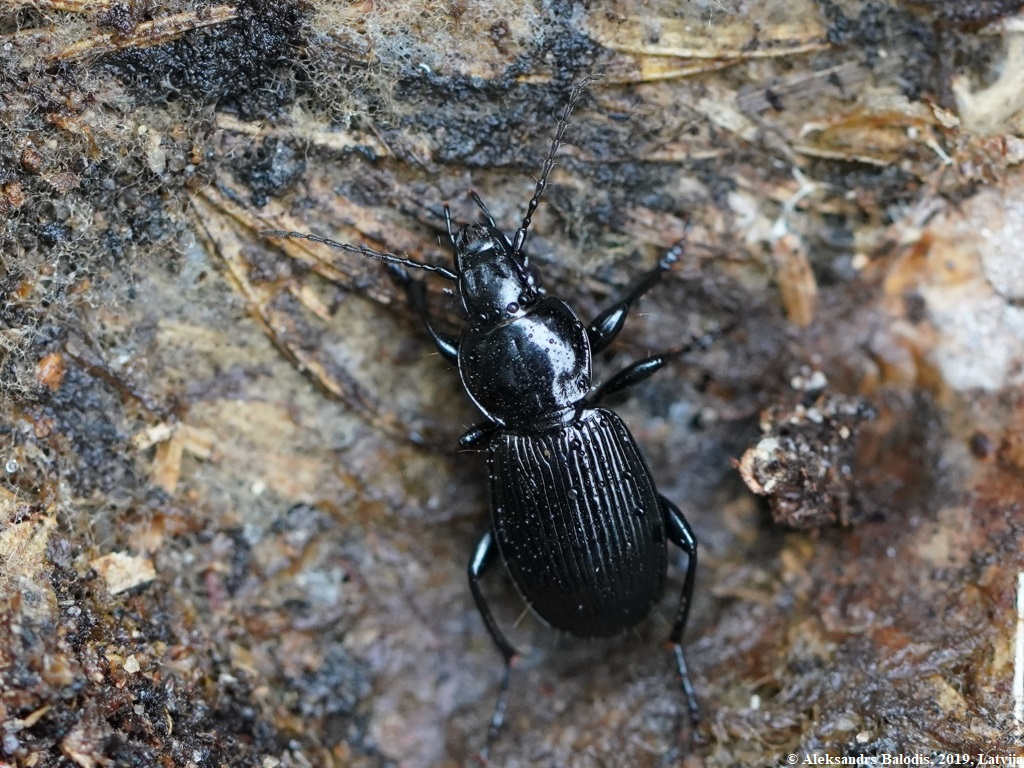

Scientific classification
- Kingdom: Animalia
- Phylum: Arthropoda
- Class: Insecta
- Order: Coleoptera
- Suborder: Adephaga
- Family: Carabidae
- Subfamily: Pterostichinae
- Tribe: Pterostichini
- Genus: Pterostichus
- Species: P. rhaeticus

Binomial name
- Pterostichus rhaeticus Heer, 1837

= Pterostichus rhaeticus =

Species of beetle

Pterostichus rhaeticus is a species of ground beetle native to Europe.
