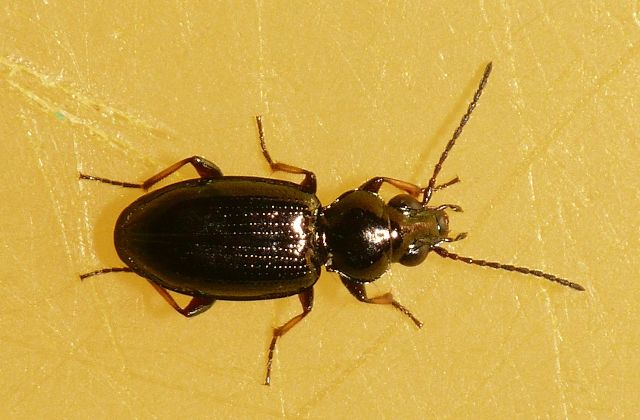

Scientific classification
- Kingdom: Animalia
- Phylum: Arthropoda
- Class: Insecta
- Order: Coleoptera
- Suborder: Adephaga
- Family: Carabidae
- Genus: Bembidion
- Species: B. properans

Binomial name
- Bembidion properans (Stephens, 1828)

= Bembidion properans =

Species of beetle

Bembidion properans is a species of ground beetle in the family Carabidae. It is found in North America, Europe, Africa, and temperate Asia.
