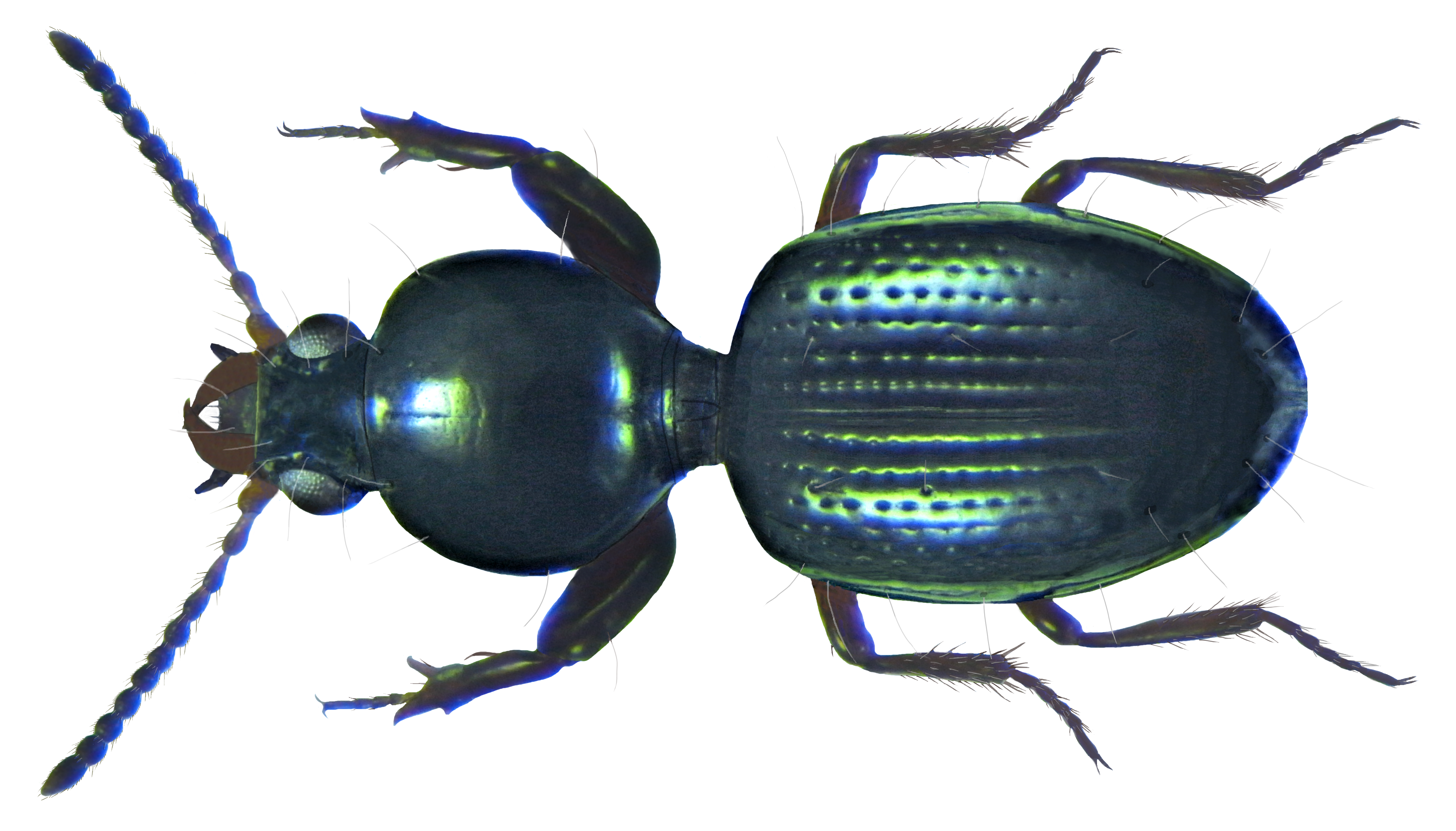
- Dyschiriodes globosus

Scientific classification
- Kingdom: Animalia
- Phylum: Arthropoda
- Class: Insecta
- Order: Coleoptera
- Suborder: Adephaga
- Family: Carabidae
- Genus: Dyschirius
- Species: D. globosus

Binomial name
- Dyschirius globosus Herbst, 1784

= Dyschirius globosus =

Species of beetle

Dyschirius globosus is a species of ground beetle in the subfamily Scaritinae. It was described by Herbst in 1784.
