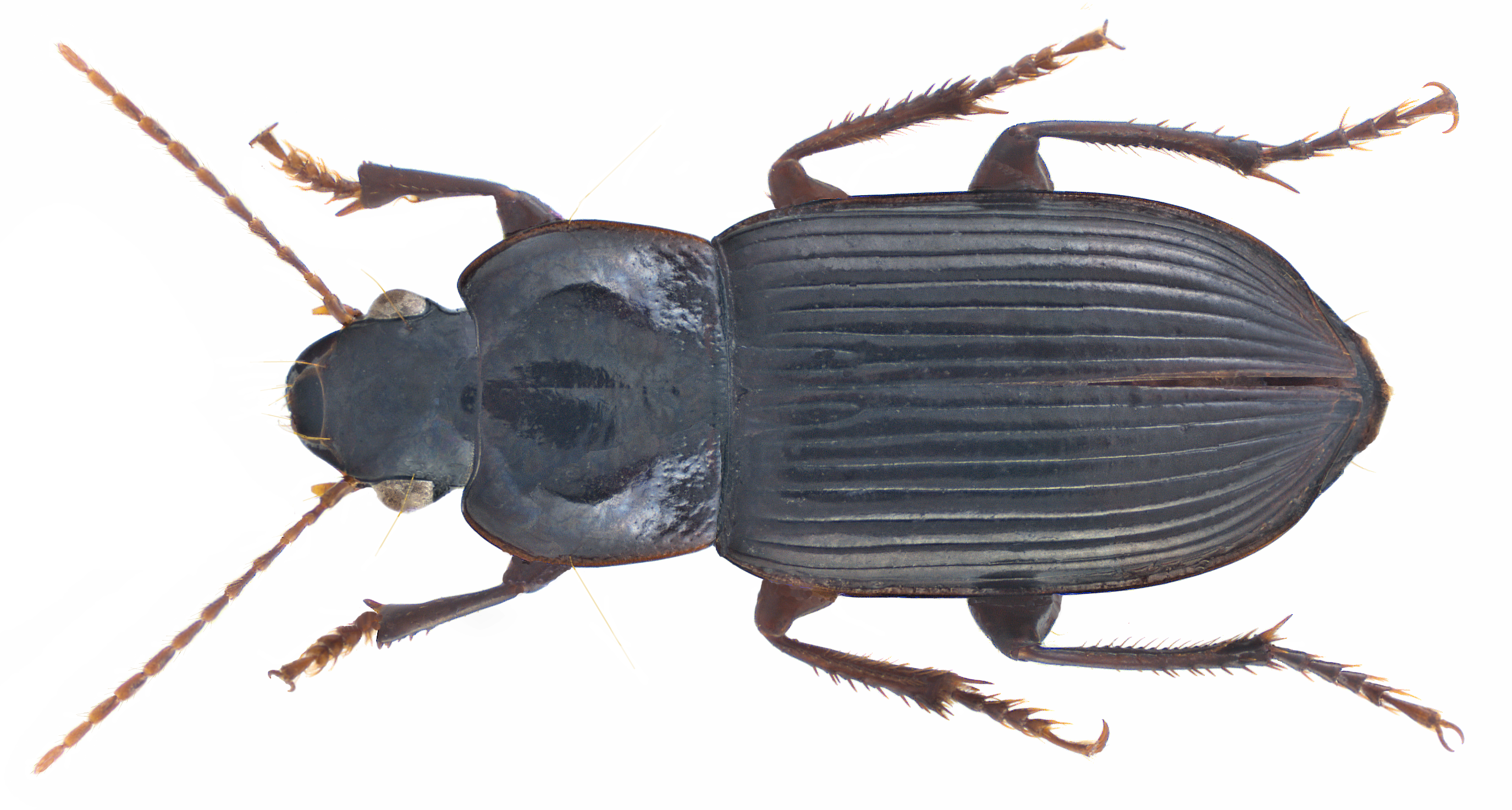
- Family: Carabidae Size: 9,7 mm Location: Spain, Canary Islands, Tenerife, Teno, Erjos, 1030 m, Casa Forestal leg. J.Schoenfeld, 8.X.2001; det. Lompe, 2012

Scientific classification
- Kingdom: Animalia
- Phylum: Arthropoda
- Class: Insecta
- Order: Coleoptera
- Suborder: Adephaga
- Family: Carabidae
- Genus: Harpalus
- Species: H. tenebrosus

Binomial name
- Harpalus tenebrosus Dejean, 1829

Synonyms
- Harpalus paivanus

= Harpalus tenebrosus =

Species of beetle

Harpalus tenebrosus is a species of ground beetle in the subfamily Harpalinae. It was described by Pierre François Marie Auguste Dejean in 1829.
