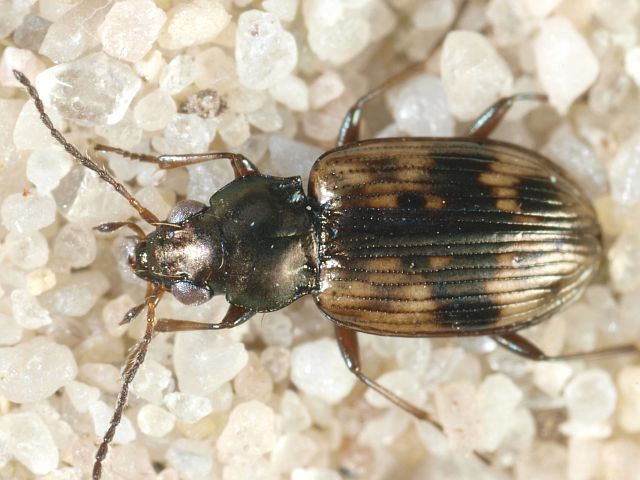

Scientific classification
- Kingdom: Animalia
- Phylum: Arthropoda
- Class: Insecta
- Order: Coleoptera
- Suborder: Adephaga
- Family: Carabidae
- Genus: Bembidion
- Species: B. semipunctatum

Binomial name
- Bembidion semipunctatum (Donovan, 1806)

Synonyms
- Bembidion provoanum Casey, 1918

= Bembidion semipunctatum =

Species of beetle

Bembidion semipunctatum is a species of ground beetle in the family Carabidae. It is found in North America and Europe.
