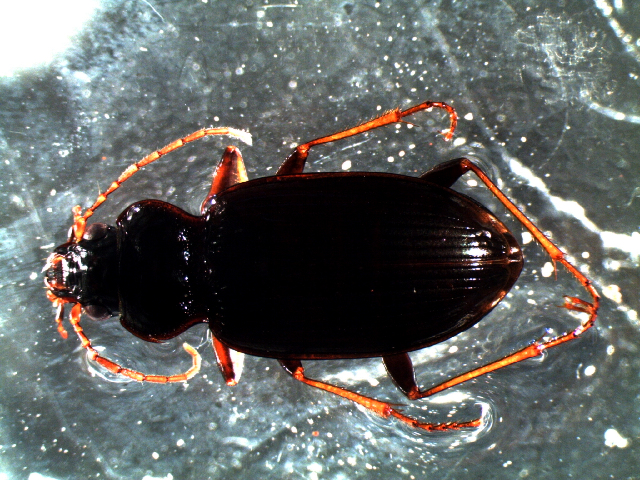

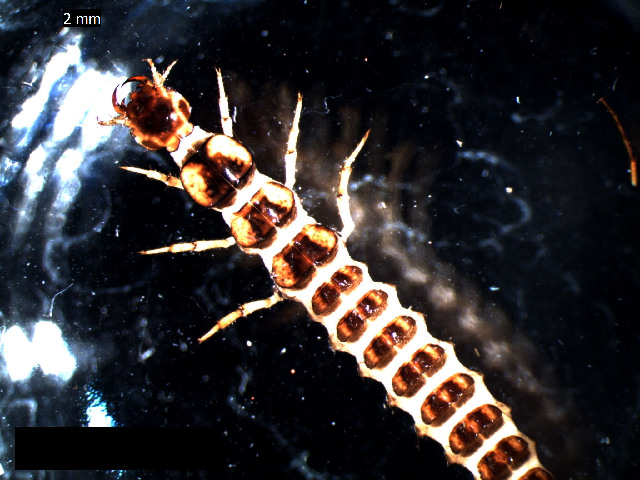

Scientific classification
- Domain: Eukaryota
- Kingdom: Animalia
- Phylum: Arthropoda
- Class: Insecta
- Order: Coleoptera
- Suborder: Adephaga
- Family: Carabidae
- Genus: Nebria
- Species: N. salina

Binomial name
- Nebria salina Fairmaire & Laboulbène, 1854

= Nebria salina =

Species of beetle

Nebria salina is a species of ground beetle native to Europe.
