= Harpalus calceatus =

Scientific classification
- Kingdom: Animalia
- Phylum: Arthropoda
- Class: Insecta
- Order: Coleoptera
- Suborder: Adephaga
- Family: Carabidae
- Genus: Harpalus
- Species: H. calceatus

Binomial name
- Harpalus calceatus (Duftschmid, 1812)

Species of beetle

Harpalus calceatus is a species of ground beetle in the subfamily Harpalinae. It was described by Duftschmid in 1811.
