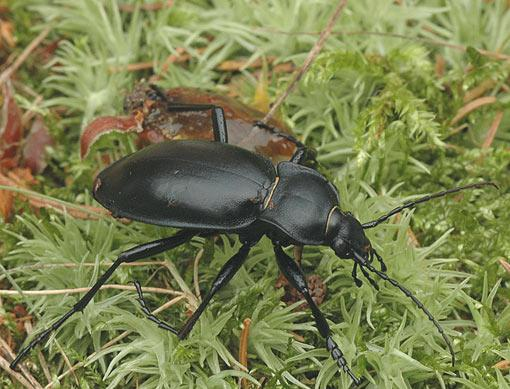

Scientific classification
- Kingdom: Animalia
- Phylum: Arthropoda
- Clade: Pancrustacea
- Class: Insecta
- Order: Coleoptera
- Suborder: Adephaga
- Family: Carabidae
- Genus: Carabus
- Species: C. glabratus

Binomial name
- Carabus glabratus Paykull, 1790

= Carabus glabratus =

Species of beetle

Carabus glabratus is a species of beetle. It is a Boreo-arctic Montane species widespread in Central Europe and Northern Europe north to the Arctic Circle.

C. glabratus
