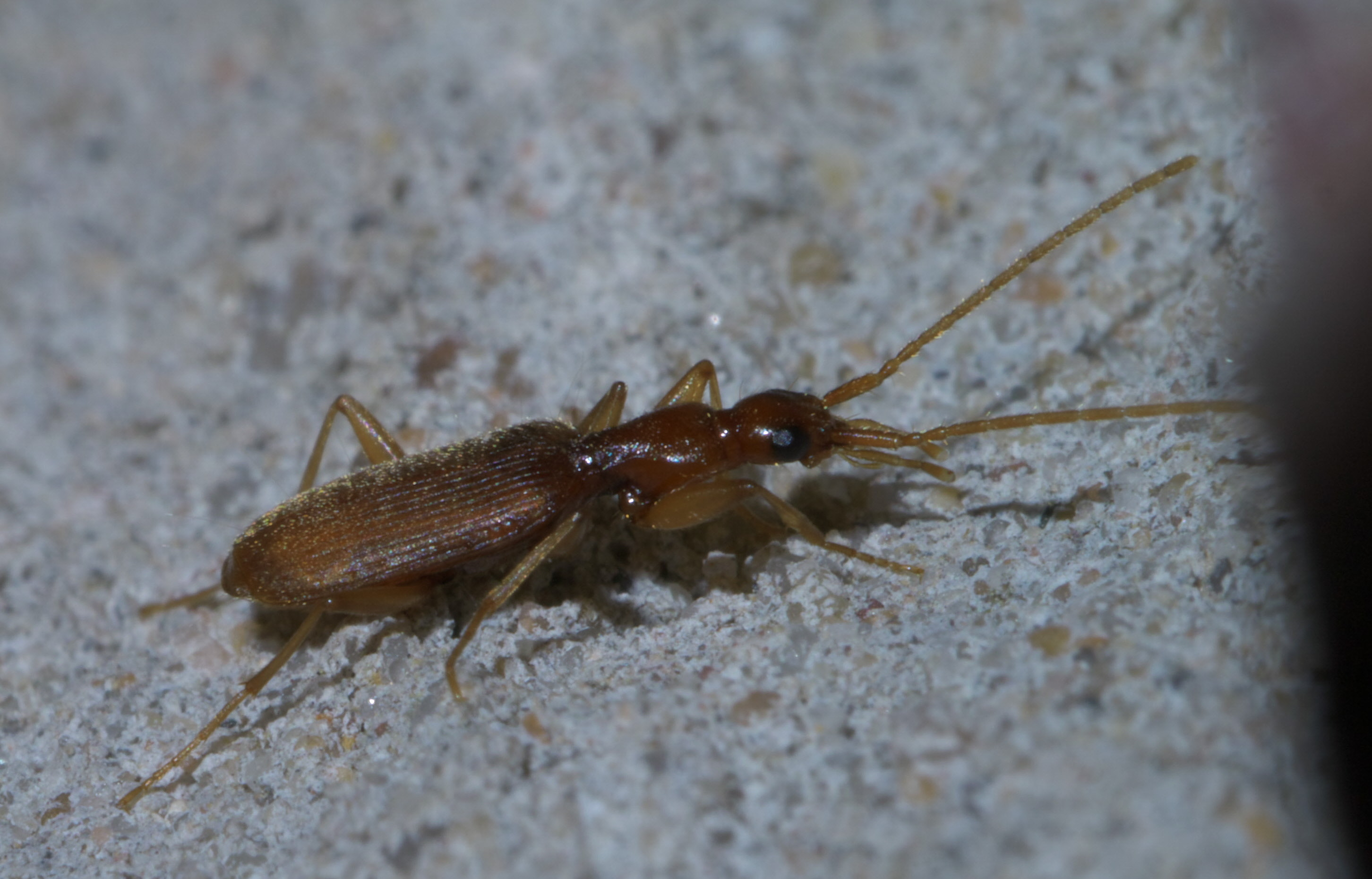
- Pseudaptinus

Scientific classification
- Domain: Eukaryota
- Kingdom: Animalia
- Phylum: Arthropoda
- Class: Insecta
- Order: Coleoptera
- Suborder: Adephaga
- Family: Carabidae
- Subfamily: Dryptinae; Bonelli, 1810

Tribes
- Dryptini Bonelli, 1810; Galeritini Kirby, 1825; Zuphiini Bonelli, 1810

= Dryptinae =

Subfamily of beetles

Dryptinae is a subfamily of ground beetles in the family Carabidae. There are more than 30 genera and 570 described species in Dryptinae.

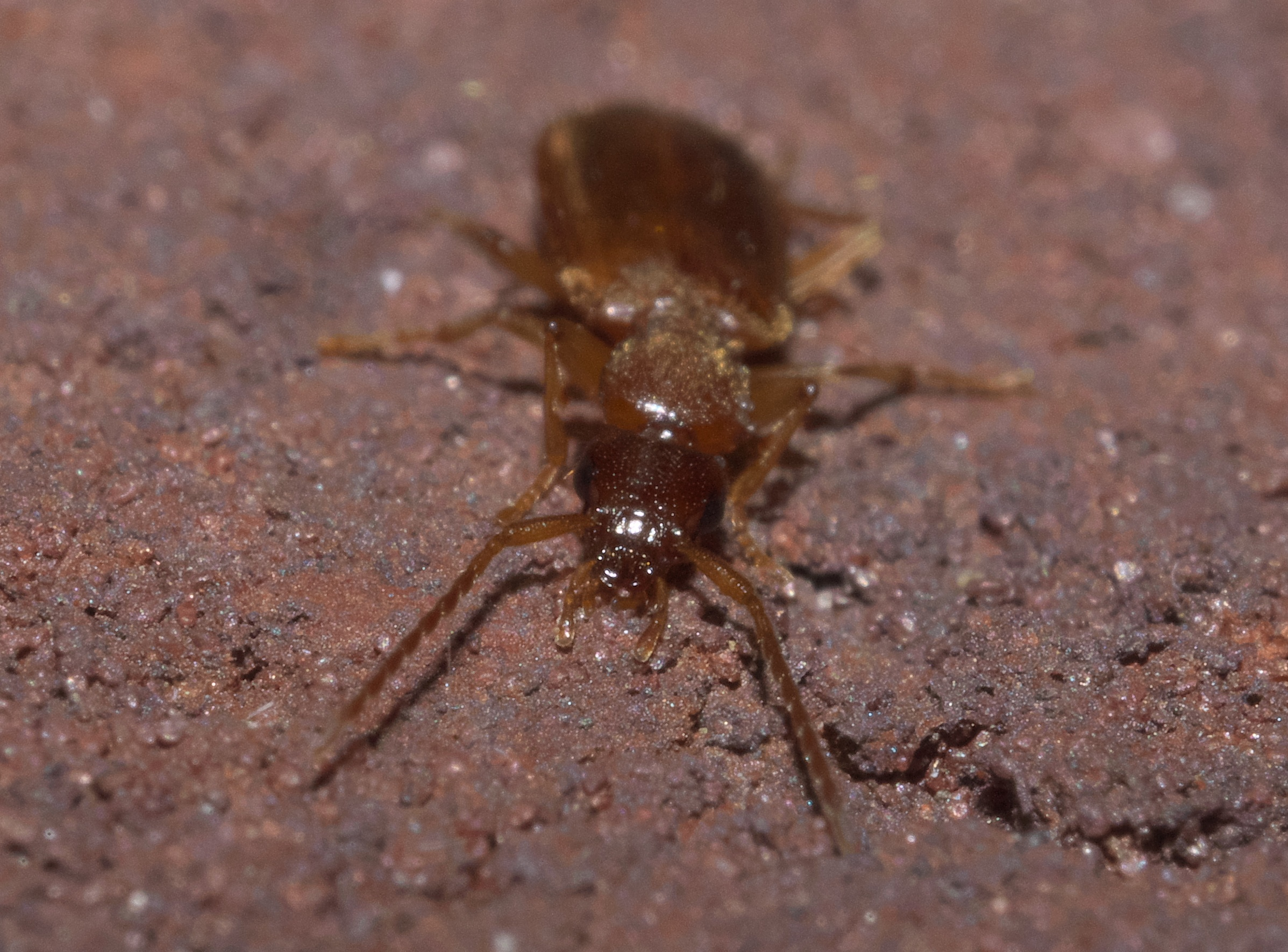
Zuphium

== Genera ==
These 33 genera belong to the subfamily Dryptinae:

- Acrogenys W.J.MacLeay, 1864
- Agastus Schmidt-Goebel, 1846
- Ancystroglossus Chaudoir, 1863
- Chaudoirella Mateu, 1982
- Coarazuphium Gnaspini; Vanin & Godoy, 1998
- Colasidia Basilewsky, 1954
- Desera Hope, 1831
- Dicrodontus Chaudoir, 1872
- Drypta Latreille, 1797
- Eunostus Laporte, 1835
- Galerita Fabricius, 1801
- Gunvorita Landin, 1955
- Ildobates Español, 1966
- Leleupidia Basilewsky, 1951
- Megadrypta Sciaky & Anichtchenko, 2020
- Metaxidius Chaudoir, 1852
- Metazuphium Mateu, 1992
- Mischocephalus Chaudoir, 1863
- Neodrypta Basilewsky, 1960
- Neoleleupidia Basilewsky, 1953
- Nesiodrypta Jeannel, 1949
- Paraleleupidia Basilewsky, 1951
- Parazuphium Jeannel, 1942
- Planetes W.S.MacLeay, 1825
- Polistichus Bonelli, 1810
- Prionodrypta Jeannel, 1949
- Pseudaptinus Laporte, 1834
- Speothalpius B.Moore, 1995
- Speozuphium B.Moore, 1995
- Trichognatha Latreille, 1829
- Typhlozuphium Baehr, 2014
- Zuphioides Ball & Shpeley, 2013
- Zuphium Latreille, 1805
