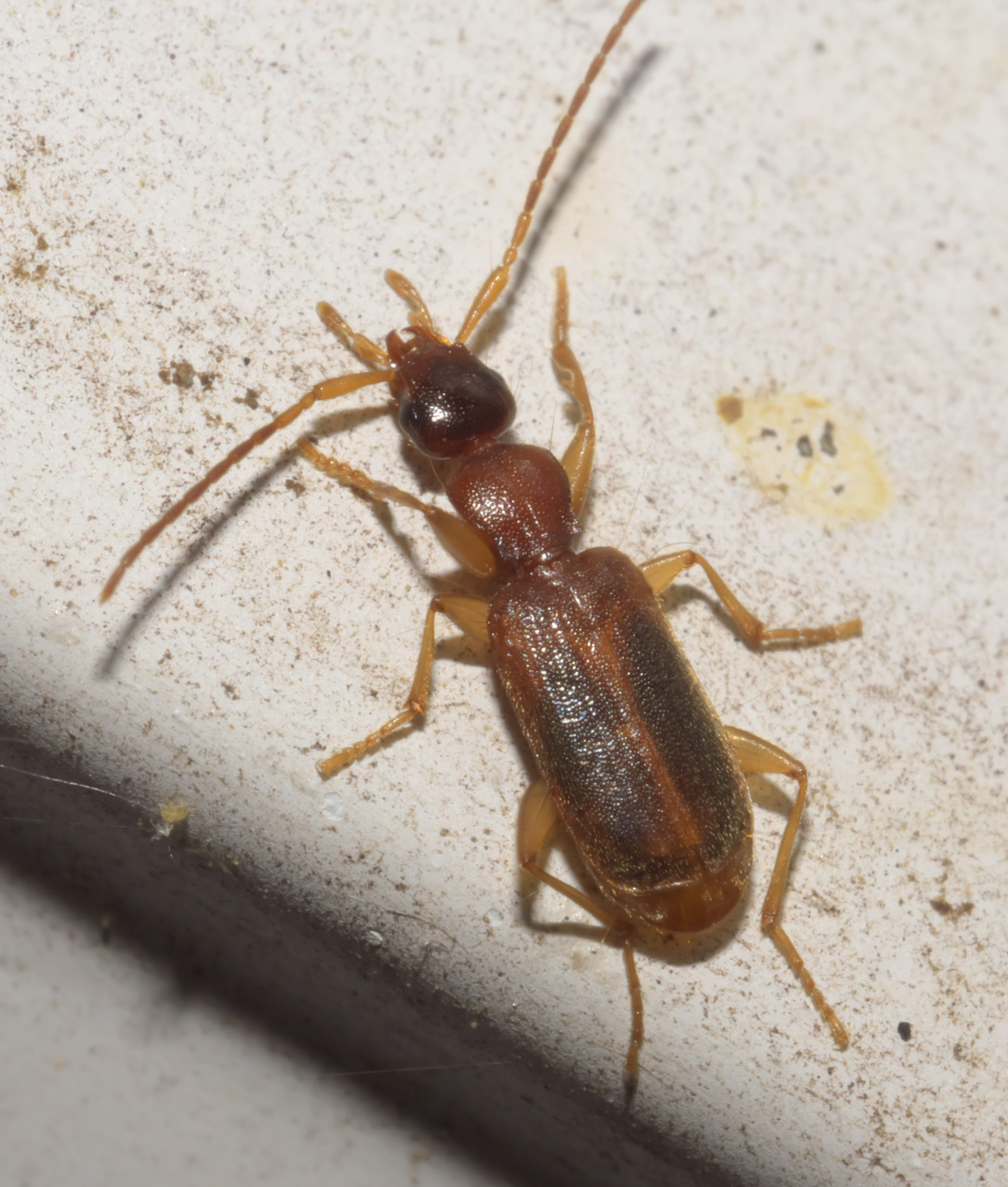
- Zuphioides americanum, Oklahoma

Scientific classification
- Domain: Eukaryota
- Kingdom: Animalia
- Phylum: Arthropoda
- Class: Insecta
- Order: Coleoptera
- Suborder: Adephaga
- Family: Carabidae
- Subfamily: Dryptinae
- Tribe: Zuphiini; Bonelli, 1810

= Zuphiini =

Tribe of beetles

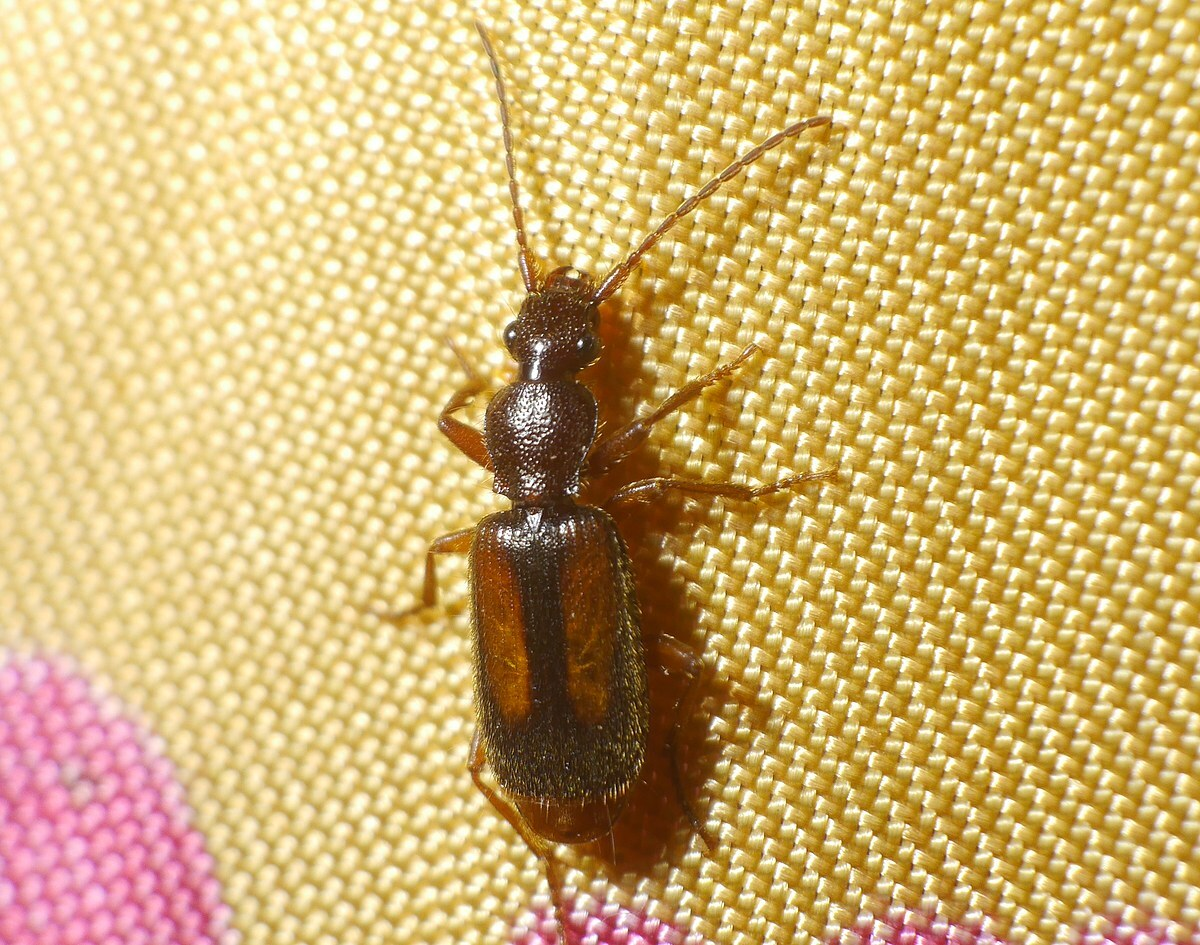
Polistichus connexus, Ukraine

Zuphiini is a tribe of ground beetles in the family Carabidae, found worldwide.

== Genera ==
Zuphiini contains the following 23 genera:

- Acrogenys W.J.MacLeay, 1864
- Agastus Schmidt-Goebel, 1846
- Chaudoirella Mateu, 1982
- Coarazuphium Gnaspini; Vanin & Godoy, 1998
- Colasidia Basilewsky, 1954
- Dicrodontus Chaudoir, 1872
- Gunvorita Landin, 1955
- Ildobates Español, 1966
- Leleupidia Basilewsky, 1951
- Metaxidius Chaudoir, 1852
- Metazuphium Mateu, 1992
- Mischocephalus Chaudoir, 1863
- Neoleleupidia Basilewsky, 1953
- Paraleleupidia Basilewsky, 1951
- Parazuphium Jeannel, 1942
- Planetes W.S.MacLeay, 1825
- Polistichus Bonelli, 1810
- Pseudaptinus Laporte, 1834
- Speothalpius B.Moore, 1995
- Speozuphium B.Moore, 1995
- Typhlozuphium Baehr, 2014
- Zuphioides Ball & Shpeley, 2013
- Zuphium Latreille, 1805
