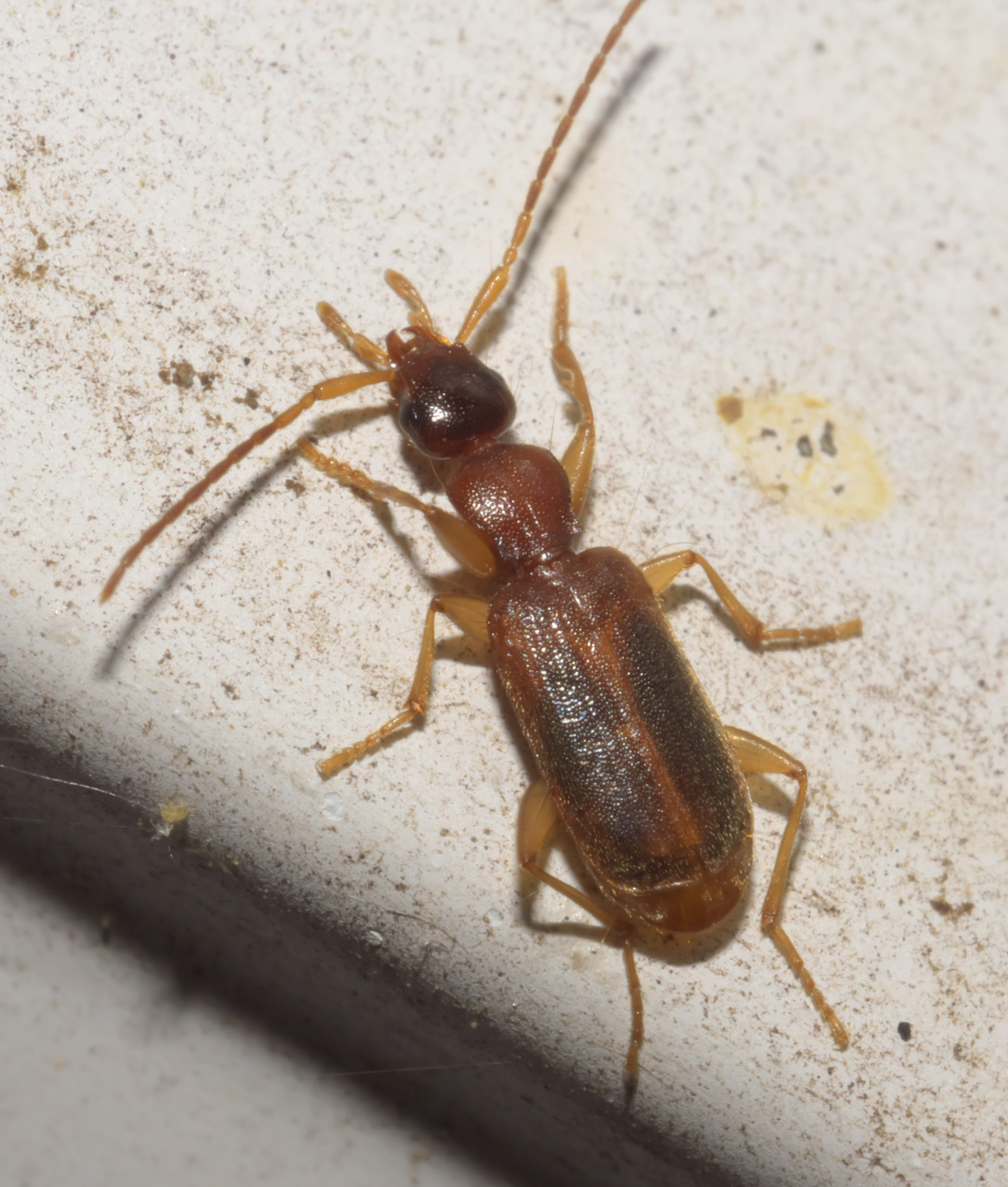
- Zuphioides americanum, Oklahoma

Scientific classification
- Kingdom: Animalia
- Phylum: Arthropoda
- Class: Insecta
- Order: Coleoptera
- Suborder: Adephaga
- Family: Carabidae
- Subfamily: Dryptinae
- Tribe: Zuphiini
- Subtribe: Zuphiina
- Genus: Zuphioides
- Species: Z. americanum

Binomial name
- Zuphioides americanum (Dejean, 1831)

Synonyms
- Zuphium americanum

= Zuphioides americanum =

Species of beetle

Zuphioides americanum is a species in the beetle family Carabidae. It is found in the United States and Canada.
