= Zuphioides longicolle =

Scientific classification
- Kingdom: Animalia
- Phylum: Arthropoda
- Class: Insecta
- Order: Coleoptera
- Suborder: Adephaga
- Family: Carabidae
- Subfamily: Dryptinae
- Tribe: Zuphiini
- Subtribe: Zuphiina
- Genus: Zuphioides
- Species: Z. longicolle

Binomial name
- Zuphioides longicolle (LeConte, 1879)

Synonyms
- Zuphium longicolle

Species of beetle

Zuphioides longicolle is a species in the beetle family Carabidae. It is found in the United States and Mexico.
