= Thalpius =

Thalpius may refer to:

- Thalpius (beetle), a subgenus of ground beetles in the genus Pseudaptinus
- Thalpius (mythology), an Epeian leader during the Trojan War
- Thalpius (planet), a minor planet that shares an orbit with Jupiter
