= Nesiodrypta iris =

Scientific classification
- Domain: Eukaryota
- Kingdom: Animalia
- Phylum: Arthropoda
- Class: Insecta
- Order: Coleoptera
- Suborder: Adephaga
- Family: Carabidae
- Subfamily: Dryptinae
- Tribe: Dryptini
- Genus: Nesiodrypta
- Species: N. iris

Binomial name
- Nesiodrypta iris (Laporte, 1840)

Synonyms
- Drypta iris Laporte, 1840

Species of beetle

Nesiodrypta iris is a species in the beetle family Carabidae. It is found in Madagascar.
