= Colasidia =

Scientific classification
- Domain: Eukaryota
- Kingdom: Animalia
- Phylum: Arthropoda
- Class: Insecta
- Order: Coleoptera
- Suborder: Adephaga
- Family: Carabidae
- Subfamily: Dryptinae
- Tribe: Zuphiini
- Subtribe: Leleupidiina
- Genus: Colasidia; Basilewsky, 1954

Genus of beetles

Colasidia is a genus in the beetle family Carabidae. There are more than 40 described species in Colasidia, found in Southeast Asia.

== Species ==
These 42 species belong to the genus Colasidia:

- Colasidia abramovi Baehr, 2008 (Vietnam)
- Colasidia adusta Baehr, 2005
- Colasidia angusticollis Baehr, 1988 (Indonesia and Borneo)
- Colasidia apicalis Baehr, 2013 (Malaysia, Indonesia, and Borneo)
- Colasidia atra Baehr, 1997 (Indonesia and Borneo)
- Colasidia attenuata Baehr, 1997 (Malaysia)
- Colasidia avicapitis Baehr, 2011 (Indonesia and New Guinea)
- Colasidia borneensis Baehr, 1997 (Indonesia and Borneo)
- Colasidia brevicornis Baehr, 1988 (Malaysia, Indonesia, and Borneo)
- Colasidia burckhardti Baehr, 1997 (Indonesia and Borneo)
- Colasidia convexior Baehr, 1993 (Indonesia)
- Colasidia cordicollis Baehr, 2013 (Indonesia and Borneo)
- Colasidia denticollis Baehr, 1997 (Indonesia)
- Colasidia depressa Baehr, 1997 (Malaysia)
- Colasidia garainae Baehr, 2000 (New Guinea and Papua)
- Colasidia gerardi Perrault, 1982 (Indonesia and Borneo)
- Colasidia globiceps Baehr, 1991 (Indonesia)
- Colasidia harpago Baehr, 2005
- Colasidia helvetorum Baehr, 1997 (Indonesia)
- Colasidia kokodae Baehr, 1991 (New Guinea and Papua)
- Colasidia lagadiga (Morvan, 1994) (Malaysia)
- Colasidia laticeps Baehr, 1997 (Indonesia and Borneo)
- Colasidia loebli Baehr, 1997 (Malaysia)
- Colasidia longicollis Baehr, 2005
- Colasidia longipennis Baehr, 2013 (Malaysia, Indonesia, and Borneo)
- Colasidia lustrans Baehr, 1991 (Indonesia)
- Colasidia macrops Baehr, 1990 (Indonesia and Borneo)
- Colasidia madang Darlington, 1971 (New Guinea and Papua)
- Colasidia malayica Basilewsky, 1954 (Malaysia and Singapore)
- Colasidia mateui Baehr, 1997 (Malaysia, Indonesia, and Borneo)
- Colasidia microps Baehr, 2011 (New Guinea and Papua)
- Colasidia monteithi Baehr, 1987 (Australia)
- Colasidia multispinosa Baehr, 2013 (Indonesia and Borneo)
- Colasidia oviceps Baehr, 1997 (Malaysia)
- Colasidia papua Darlington, 1971 (New Guinea and Papua)
- Colasidia pumila Baehr, 1990 (Indonesia and Borneo)
- Colasidia riedeli Baehr, 1990 (Indonesia and Borneo)
- Colasidia rougemonti (Morvan, 1994) (Malaysia)
- Colasidia similis Baehr, 1997 (Indonesia)
- Colasidia taylori Baehr, 1988 (Indonesia and Borneo)
- Colasidia triangularis Baehr, 1997 (Malaysia)
- Colasidia wau Baehr, 2004 (New Guinea and Papua)
