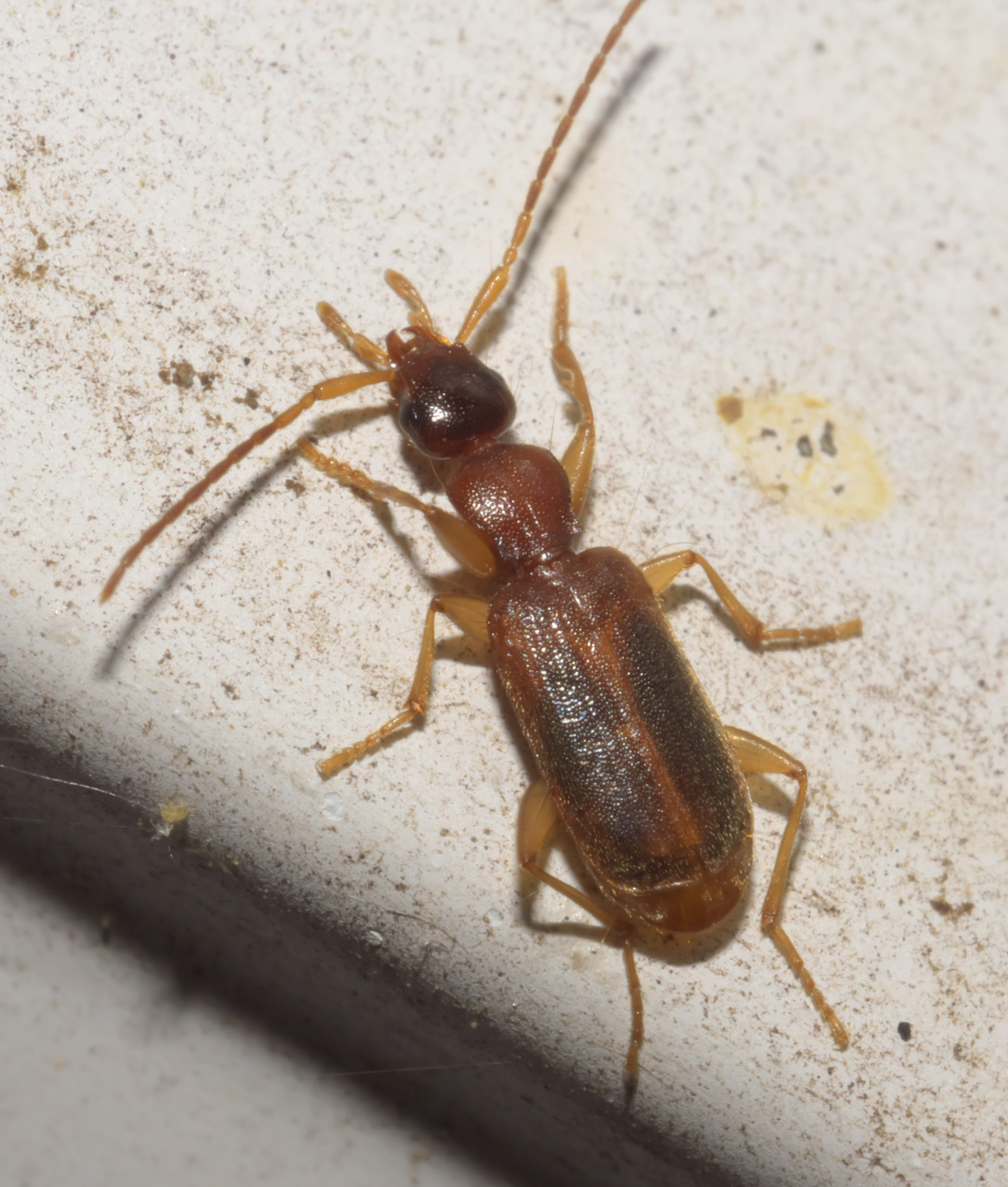
- Zuphioides americanum, Oklahoma

Scientific classification
- Domain: Eukaryota
- Kingdom: Animalia
- Phylum: Arthropoda
- Class: Insecta
- Order: Coleoptera
- Suborder: Adephaga
- Family: Carabidae
- Subfamily: Dryptinae
- Tribe: Zuphiini
- Subtribe: Zuphiina
- Genus: Zuphioides; Ball & Shpeley, 2013

= Zuphioides =

Genus of beetles

Zuphioides is a genus of in the beetle family Carabidae. There are more than 20 described species in Zuphioides, found in North, Central, and South America.

== Species ==
These 23 species belong to the genus Zuphioides:

- Zuphioides aequinoctiale (Chaudoir, 1863) (Brazil)
- Zuphioides americanum (Dejean, 1831) (United States and Canada)
- Zuphioides argentinicum (Liebke, 1933) (Argentina)
- Zuphioides batesii (Chaudoir, 1863) (Brazil)
- Zuphioides bierigi (Liebke, 1933) (Cuba)
- Zuphioides brasiliense (Chaudoir, 1872) (Brazil)
- Zuphioides bruchi (Liebke, 1933) (Argentina)
- Zuphioides capitum (Liebke, 1933) (Colombia)
- Zuphioides columbianum (Chaudoir, 1872) (Colombia)
- Zuphioides cubanum (Liebke, 1933) (Cuba)
- Zuphioides delectum (Liebke, 1933) (United States)
- Zuphioides exiguum (Putzeys, 1878) (Colombia)
- Zuphioides exquisitum (Liebke, 1933) (Mexico)
- Zuphioides flohri (Liebke, 1933) (Mexico)
- Zuphioides haitianum (Darlington, 1936) (Hispaniola)
- Zuphioides lizeri (Liebke, 1933) (Bolivia)
- Zuphioides longicolle (LeConte, 1879) (United States and Mexico)
- Zuphioides magnum (Schaeffer, 1910) (United States)
- Zuphioides mexicanum (Chaudoir, 1863) (United States and Mexico)
- Zuphioides pseudamericanum (Mateu, 1981) (United States)
- Zuphioides punctipenne (Bates, 1891) (Mexico)
- Zuphioides pusillum (Chaudoir, 1863) (Brazil)
- Zuphioides salivanum (Liebke, 1933) (Venezuela)
