= Pseudaptinus tenuicollis =

Scientific classification
- Domain: Eukaryota
- Kingdom: Animalia
- Phylum: Arthropoda
- Class: Insecta
- Order: Coleoptera
- Suborder: Adephaga
- Family: Carabidae
- Genus: Pseudaptinus
- Species: P. tenuicollis

Binomial name
- Pseudaptinus tenuicollis (LeConte, 1851)

Synonyms
- Pseudaptinus tenuicornis Chaudoir, 1872

Species of beetle

Pseudaptinus tenuicollis is a species of ground beetle in the family Carabidae. It is found in Central America and North America.
