= Parazuphium =

Scientific classification
- Domain: Eukaryota
- Kingdom: Animalia
- Phylum: Arthropoda
- Class: Insecta
- Order: Coleoptera
- Suborder: Adephaga
- Family: Carabidae
- Subfamily: Dryptinae
- Tribe: Zuphiini
- Subtribe: Zuphiina
- Genus: Parazuphium; Jeannel, 1942

Subgenera
- Austrozuphium Baehr, 1985; Parazuphium Jeannel, 1942

Genus of beetles

Parazuphium is a genus in the beetle family Carabidae. There are more than 40 described species in Parazuphium.

== Species ==
These 43 species belong to the genus Parazuphium:

- Parazuphium aguilerai Andujar; Hernando & Ribera, 2011
- Parazuphium angolanum Mateu, 1993
- Parazuphium angustioculus Hurka, 1982
- Parazuphium ascendens (Alluaud, 1917)
- Parazuphium baeticum (K. & J.Daniel, 1898)
- Parazuphium barbarae Baehr, 1985
- Parazuphium basilewskyi Mateu, 1993
- Parazuphium basutolandicus Mateu, 1993
- Parazuphium blandum Mateu, 1990
- Parazuphium chevrolatii (Laporte, 1833)
- Parazuphium damascenum (Fairmaire, 1897)
- Parazuphium darlingtoni Baehr, 1985
- Parazuphium debile (Péringuey, 1898)
- Parazuphium dubium Mateu, 1993
- Parazuphium feloi Machado, 1998
- Parazuphium flavescens Baehr, 1985
- Parazuphium impressicolle (Fairmaire, 1901)
- Parazuphium inconspicuum (Schmidt-Goebel, 1846)
- Parazuphium laticolle Basilewsky, 1962
- Parazuphium longipenis Mateu, 1993
- Parazuphium maroccanum (Antoine, 1963)
- Parazuphium mastersii (Laporte, 1867)
- Parazuphium melanocephalum (Basilewsky, 1948)
- Parazuphium mirei Mateu, 1993
- Parazuphium narzikulovi (Mikhailov, 1972)
- Parazuphium nitens Mateu, 1993
- Parazuphium pallidum (Basilewsky, 1948)
- Parazuphium philippinense (Jedlicka, 1935)
- Parazuphium pilbarae Baehr, 2014
- Parazuphium punicum (K. & J.Daniel, 1898)
- Parazuphium ramirezi J. & E.Vives, 1976
- Parazuphium rarum Mateu, 1993
- Parazuphium roberti (Fairmaire, 1897)
- Parazuphium rockhamptonense (Laporte, 1867)
- Parazuphium salmoni Assmann; Renan & Wrase, 2015
- Parazuphium sinuum (Darlington, 1968)
- Parazuphium tropicum Baehr, 1985
- Parazuphium turcomanicum (Reitter, 1908)
- Parazuphium varians Mateu, 1993
- Parazuphium vaucheri (Vauloger de Beaupré, 1898)
- Parazuphium vibex (Motschulsky, 1844)
- Parazuphium weigeli Wrase & Assmann, 2021
- Parazuphium weiri Baehr, 1985
