= Desera =

Scientific classification
- Domain: Eukaryota
- Kingdom: Animalia
- Phylum: Arthropoda
- Class: Insecta
- Order: Coleoptera
- Suborder: Adephaga
- Family: Carabidae
- Subfamily: Dryptinae
- Tribe: Dryptini
- Genus: Desera; Hope, 1831

Genus of beetles

Desera is a genus in the beetle family Carabidae. There are more than 20 described species in Desera.

== Species ==
These 22 species belong to the genus Desera:

- Desera australis (Péringuey, 1896) (Africa)
- Desera bicoloripennis (Liang & Kavanaugh, 2007) (Malawi)
- Desera coelestina (Klug, 1834) (China, Pakistan, India, and Indonesia)
- Desera confusa Hansen, 1968 (China, Japan, Pakistan, India, and Laos)
- Desera crassa Andrewes, 1931 (Indonesia and Borneo)
- Desera elegans (Sloane, 1907) (Indonesia and New Guinea)
- Desera geniculata (Klug, 1834) (Indomalaya, east Asia)
- Desera gestroi (Bates, 1892) (India, Myanmar, and Laos)
- Desera inexpecta (Liang & Kavanaugh, 2007) (India)
- Desera javana (Liang & Kavanaugh, 2007) (Indonesia)
- Desera kulti Jedlicka, 1960 (China and Taiwan)
- Desera micropectinata (Liang & Kavanaugh, 2007) (Zambia)
- Desera nepalensis Hope, 1831 (China, Indomalaya)
- Desera nigripennis (Liang & Kavanaugh, 2007) (Indonesia and Borneo)
- Desera queenslandica (Liang & Kavanaugh, 2007) (Australia)
- Desera rugicollis (Chaudoir, 1861) (China, Nepal, and India)
- Desera schultzei Heller, 1923 (Philippines)
- Desera sinica (Liang & Kavanaugh, 2007) (China)
- Desera smaragdina (Chaudoir, 1861) (Australia)
- Desera ternatensis (Chaudoir, 1872) (Indonesia)
- Desera unidentata (W.S.MacLeay, 1825) (China, Indomalaya)
- Desera viridipennis Hope, 1842 (Africa)
