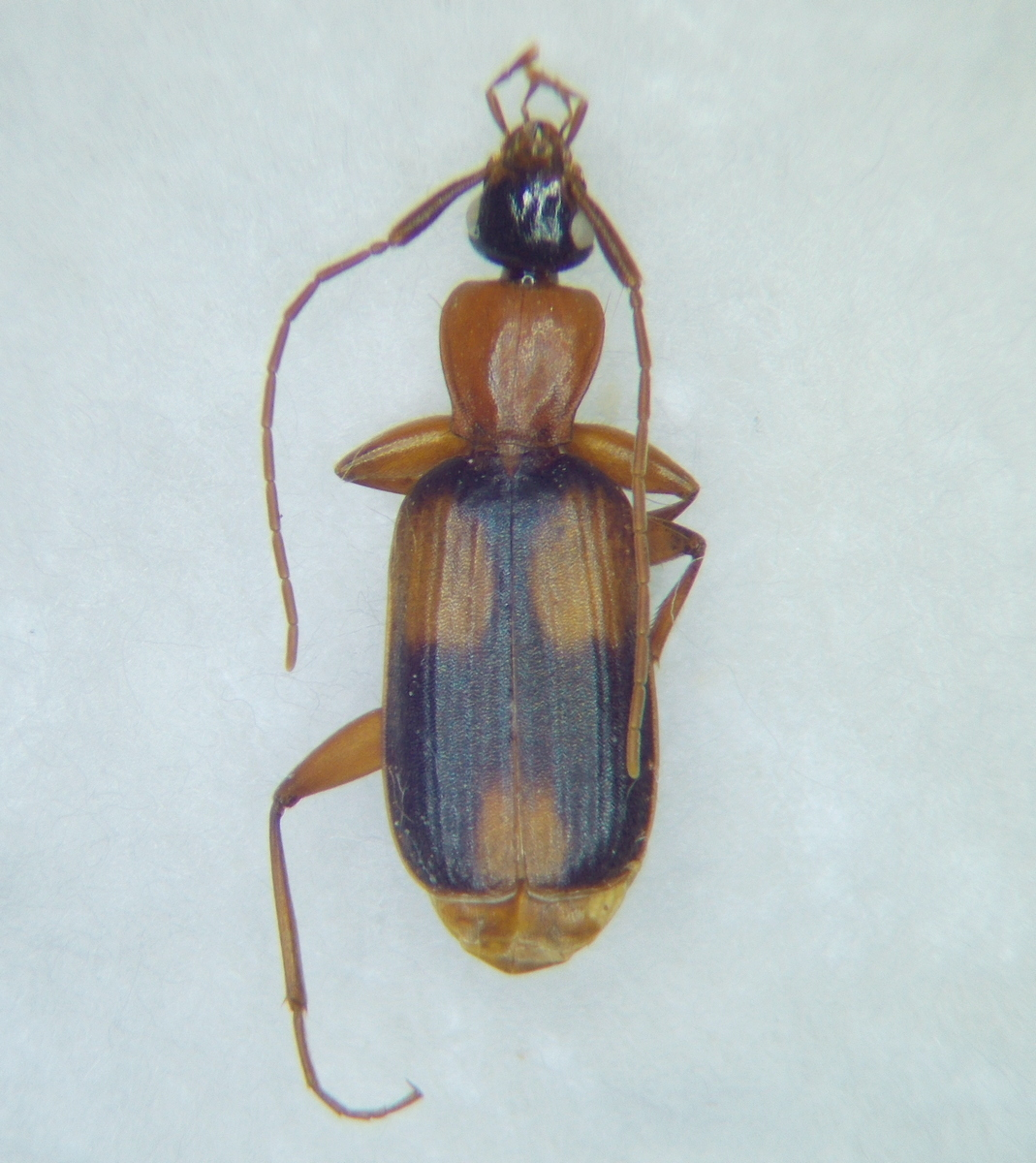
- Zuphium olens, Russia

Scientific classification
- Kingdom: Animalia
- Phylum: Arthropoda
- Class: Insecta
- Order: Coleoptera
- Suborder: Adephaga
- Family: Carabidae
- Subfamily: Dryptinae
- Tribe: Zuphiini
- Genus: Zuphium; Latreille, 1805

= Zuphium =

Genus of beetles

Zuphium is a genus of beetles in the family Carabidae.

== Species ==
These 52 species belong to the genus Zuphium:

- Zuphium australe Chaudoir, 1863
- Zuphium bedeli Vauloger de Beaupré, 1897
- Zuphium bimaculatum Schmidt-Goebel, 1846
- Zuphium bohemani Chaudoir, 1862
- Zuphium brunneum Boheman, 1848
- Zuphium caffer Boheman, 1848
- Zuphium castelnaui Gestro, 1875
- Zuphium celebense Chaudoir, 1863
- Zuphium ciliatum Vauloger de Beaupré, 1897
- Zuphium cilicium Peyron, 1858
- Zuphium coarctatum Basilewsky, 1962
- Zuphium congoense Basilewsky, 1962
- Zuphium dabreui Andrewes, 1922
- Zuphium erebeum Andrewes, 1923
- Zuphium erythrocephalum Chaudoir, 1863
- Zuphium flavum Baehr, 2001
- Zuphium fleuriasi Gory, 1833
- Zuphium formosum Bates, 1892
- Zuphium fuscum Gory, 1831
- Zuphium hungaricum J.Frivaldszky, 1877
- Zuphium indicum Andrewes, 1922
- Zuphium juengeri Mateu, 1995
- Zuphium juratulum Basilewsky, 1960
- Zuphium lecordieri Basilewsky, 1968
- Zuphium macleayanum Baehr, 1986
- Zuphium maculiceps Fairmaire, 1899
- Zuphium microphthalmum Putzeys, 1874
- Zuphium modestum Schmidt-Goebel, 1846
- Zuphium moorei Baehr, 1986
- Zuphium numidicum Lucas, 1846
- Zuphium obscurum Basilewsky, 1953
- Zuphium olens (P.Rossi, 1790)
- Zuphium orbachi Assmann; Renan; Friedman & Wrase, 2015
- Zuphium orszuliki Hurka, 2001
- Zuphium perrieri Fairmaire, 1899
- Zuphium piceum Schmidt-Goebel, 1846
- Zuphium ponticum K. & J.Daniel, 1898
- Zuphium praestans Bates, 1892
- Zuphium rudolphi G.Müller, 1941
- Zuphium ruficeps Apetz, 1854
- Zuphium rufotinctum Fairmaire, 1901
- Zuphium sedlaceki Baehr, 2010
- Zuphium seyrigi Jeannel, 1949
- Zuphium siamense Chaudoir, 1872
- Zuphium syriacum Chaudoir, 1861
- Zuphium tecospilum Basilewsky, 1948
- Zuphium testaceum Klug, 1832
- Zuphium thouzeti Laporte, 1867
- Zuphium trigemme Andrewes, 1936
- Zuphium trimaculatum Péringuey, 1898
- Zuphium tschitscherini Jedlicka, 1964
- Zuphium ustum Klug, 1834
