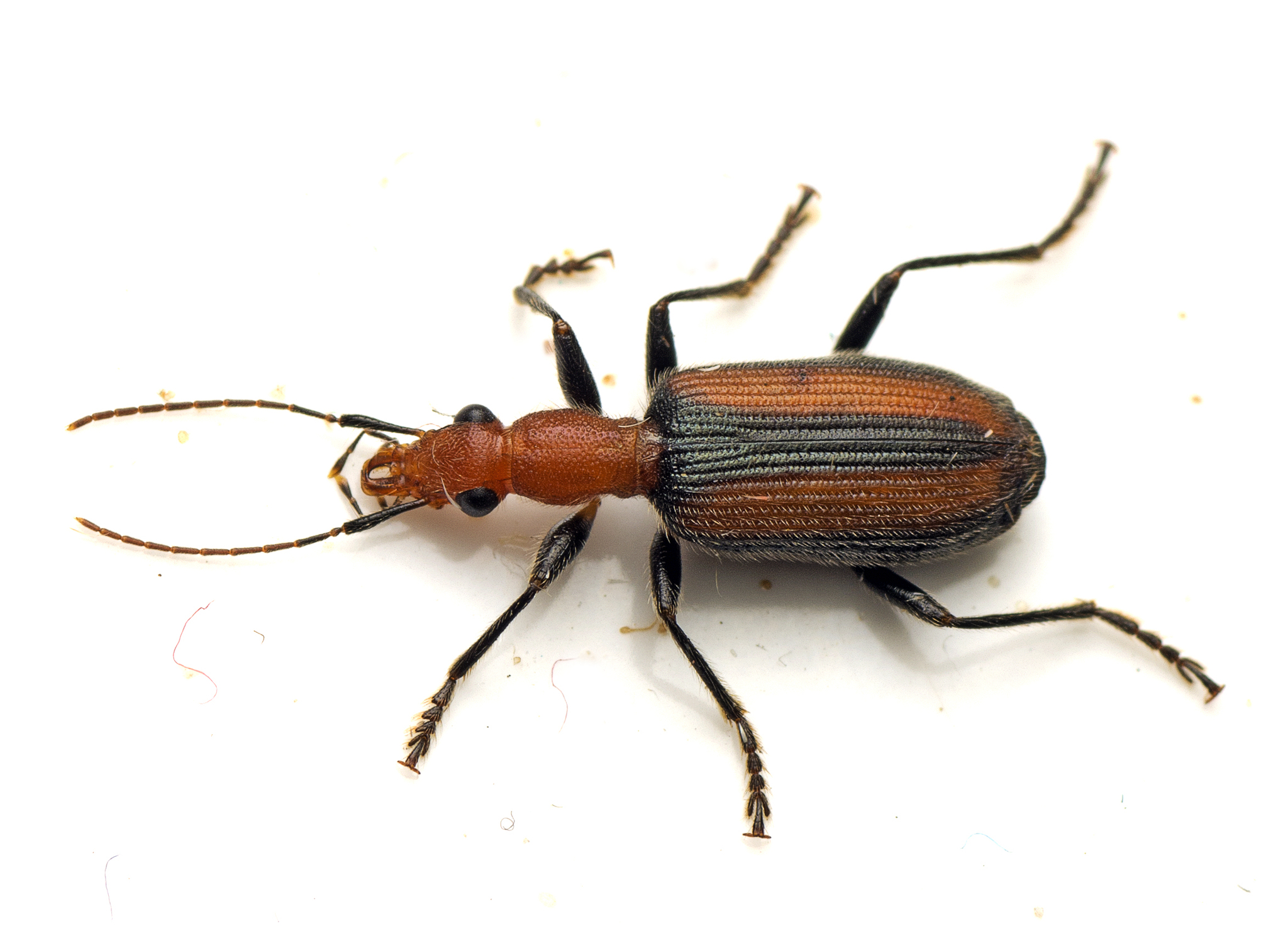
- Drypta australis, Australia

Scientific classification
- Kingdom: Animalia
- Phylum: Arthropoda
- Class: Insecta
- Order: Coleoptera
- Suborder: Adephaga
- Family: Carabidae
- Subfamily: Dryptinae
- Genus: Drypta; Latreille, 1796

Subgenera
- Deserida Basilewsky, 1960; Drypta Latreille, 1797

= Drypta =

Genus of beetles

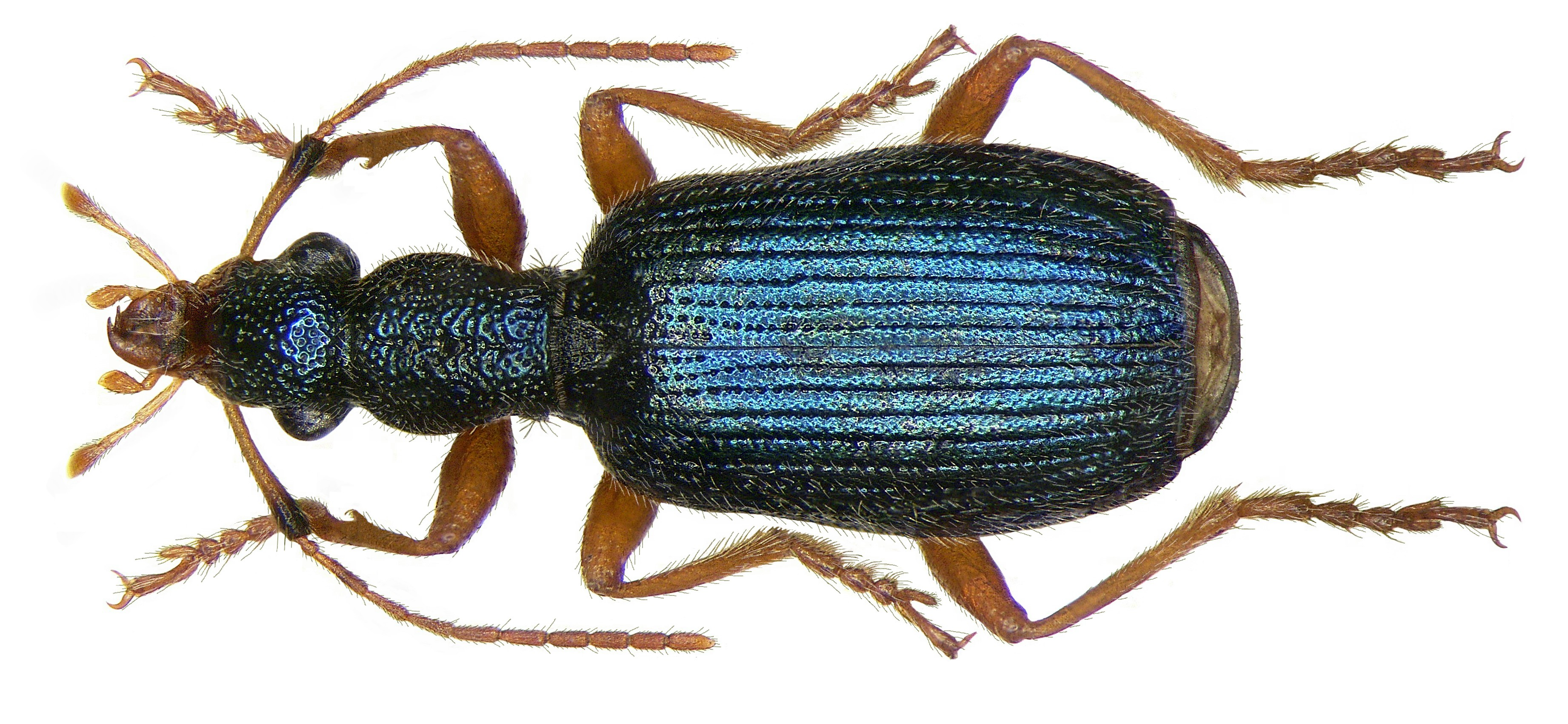
Drypta dentata

Drypta is a genus of beetles in the family Carabidae.

== Species ==
These 47 species belong to the genus Drypta:

- Drypta aeneipennis Bates, 1889
- Drypta aeneipes Wiedemann, 1823
- Drypta aetheria Andrewes, 1936
- Drypta allardi Chaudoir, 1877
- Drypta amabilis Chaudoir, 1852
- Drypta argillacea Andrewes, 1924
- Drypta australis Dejean, 1825
- Drypta brevis Péringuey, 1896
- Drypta camerunica Basilewsky, 1960
- Drypta clarkei Basilewsky, 1984
- Drypta connecta Chaudoir, 1877
- Drypta cyanea Laporte, 1835
- Drypta cyanella Chaudoir, 1843
- Drypta cyanicollis Fairmaire, 1897
- Drypta cyanopus Andrewes, 1936
- Drypta dealata Burgeon, 1937
- Drypta dentata (P.Rossi, 1790)
- Drypta dilutipes Motschulsky, 1864
- Drypta dimidiata Putzeys, 1880
- Drypta distincta (P.Rossi, 1792)
- Drypta feae Gestro, 1875
- Drypta flavipes Wiedemann, 1823
- Drypta fulveola Bates, 1883
- Drypta fumata Fairmaire, 1899
- Drypta fumigata Putzeys, 1875
- Drypta japonica Bates, 1873
- Drypta kenyana Facchini, 2011
- Drypta lineola W.S.MacLeay, 1825
- Drypta longicollis W.S.MacLeay, 1825
- Drypta mastersii W.J.MacLeay, 1871
- Drypta melanarthra Chaudoir, 1861
- Drypta minuta Basilewsky, 1960
- Drypta minutula Facchini, 2011
- Drypta mordorata Basilewsky, 1953
- Drypta mouhoti Chaudoir, 1872
- Drypta neglecta Basilewsky, 1960
- Drypta nigricornis Basilewsky, 1960
- Drypta papua Darlington, 1968
- Drypta parumpunctata Chaudoir, 1861
- Drypta pyriformis Quedenfeldt, 1883
- Drypta ruficollis Dejean, 1831
- Drypta schoutedeni Basilewsky, 1949
- Drypta semenovi Jedlicka, 1964
- Drypta sulcicollis Putzeys, 1875
- Drypta thoracica Boheman, 1848
- Drypta ussuriensis Jedlicka, 1963
- Drypta viridipennis Facchini, 2011
