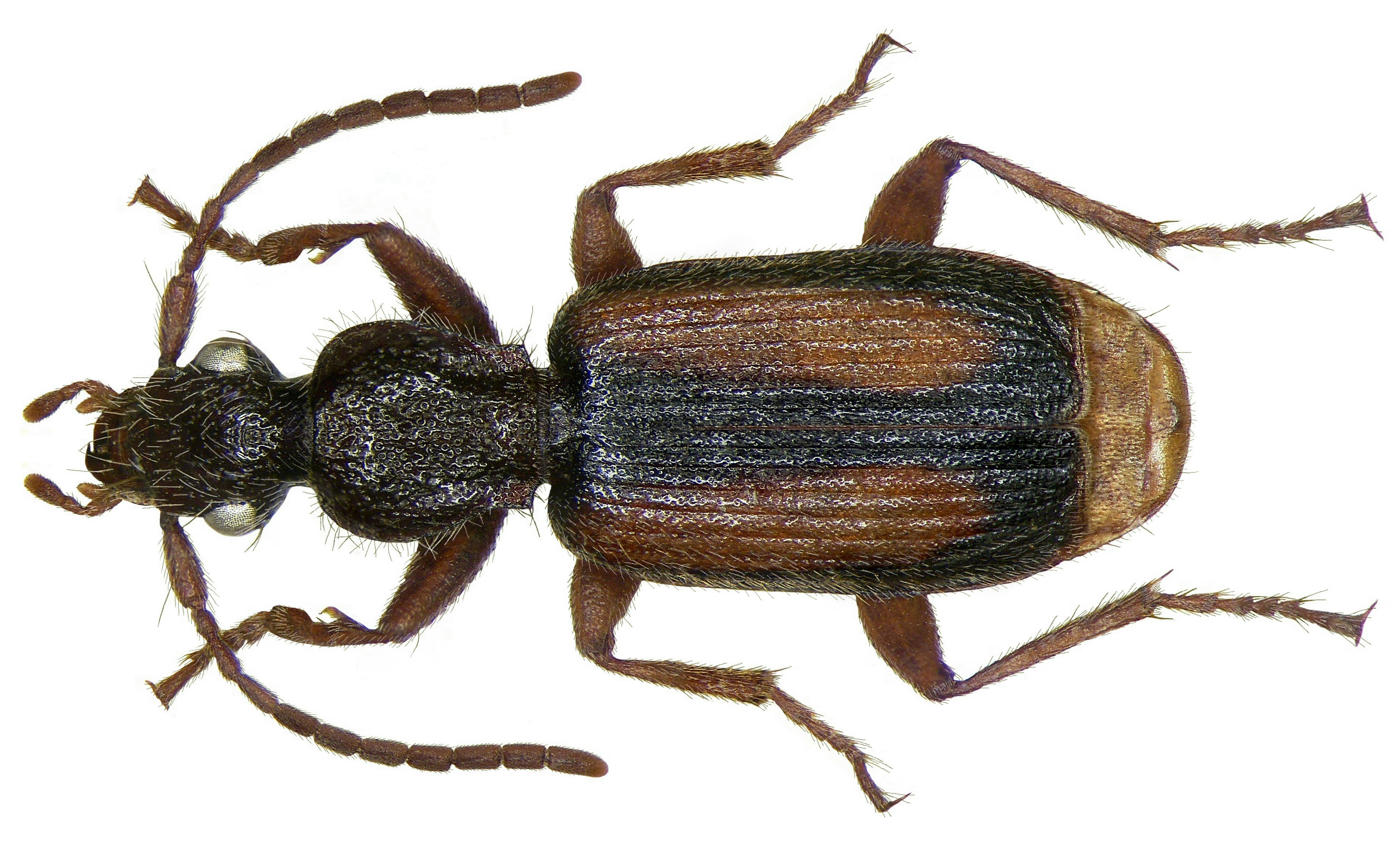

Scientific classification
- Kingdom: Animalia
- Phylum: Arthropoda
- Clade: Pancrustacea
- Class: Insecta
- Order: Coleoptera
- Suborder: Adephaga
- Family: Carabidae
- Genus: Polistichus
- Species: P. connexus

Binomial name
- Polistichus connexus (Fourcroy, 1785)

= Polistichus connexus =

Species of beetle

Polistichus connexus is a species of beetle in the family Carabidae that is found in Bulgaria and Romania. The species is brownish-black coloured.
