= Nesiodrypta =

Scientific classification
- Domain: Eukaryota
- Kingdom: Animalia
- Phylum: Arthropoda
- Class: Insecta
- Order: Coleoptera
- Suborder: Adephaga
- Family: Carabidae
- Subfamily: Dryptinae
- Tribe: Dryptini
- Genus: Nesiodrypta; Jeannel, 1949

Genus of ground beetles

Nesiodrypta is a genus of in the beetle family Carabidae. There are about 18 described species in Nesiodrypta.

== Species ==
These 18 species belong to the genus Nesiodrypta:

- Nesiodrypta alluaudi Jeannel, 1949 (Madagascar)
- Nesiodrypta apicipalpis (Fairmaire, 1899) (Madagascar)
- Nesiodrypta caelestis (Alluaud, 1935) (Madagascar)
- Nesiodrypta cupripennis Jeannel, 1949 (Madagascar)
- Nesiodrypta iris (Laporte, 1840) (Madagascar)
- Nesiodrypta microphthalma Jeannel, 1949 (Madagascar)
- Nesiodrypta mira (Alluaud, 1935) (Madagascar)
- Nesiodrypta montisgallorum Jeannel, 1949 (Madagascar)
- Nesiodrypta negrettii (Facchini & Czeppel, 2011) (Gabon)
- Nesiodrypta perrieri (Fairmaire, 1897) (Madagascar)
- Nesiodrypta posticespinosa Basilewsky, 1960 (Tanzania)
- Nesiodrypta purpurascens Jeannel, 1949 (Madagascar)
- Nesiodrypta quadrispina (Fairmaire, 1897) (Madagascar)
- Nesiodrypta setigera (Gerstaecker, 1867) (Kenya and Tanzania)
- Nesiodrypta seyrigi Jeannel, 1949 (Madagascar)
- Nesiodrypta tetroxys Jeannel, 1949 (Madagascar)
- Nesiodrypta viridicollis Jeannel, 1949 (Madagascar)
- Nesiodrypta waterhousei (Oberthür, 1881) (Madagascar)
