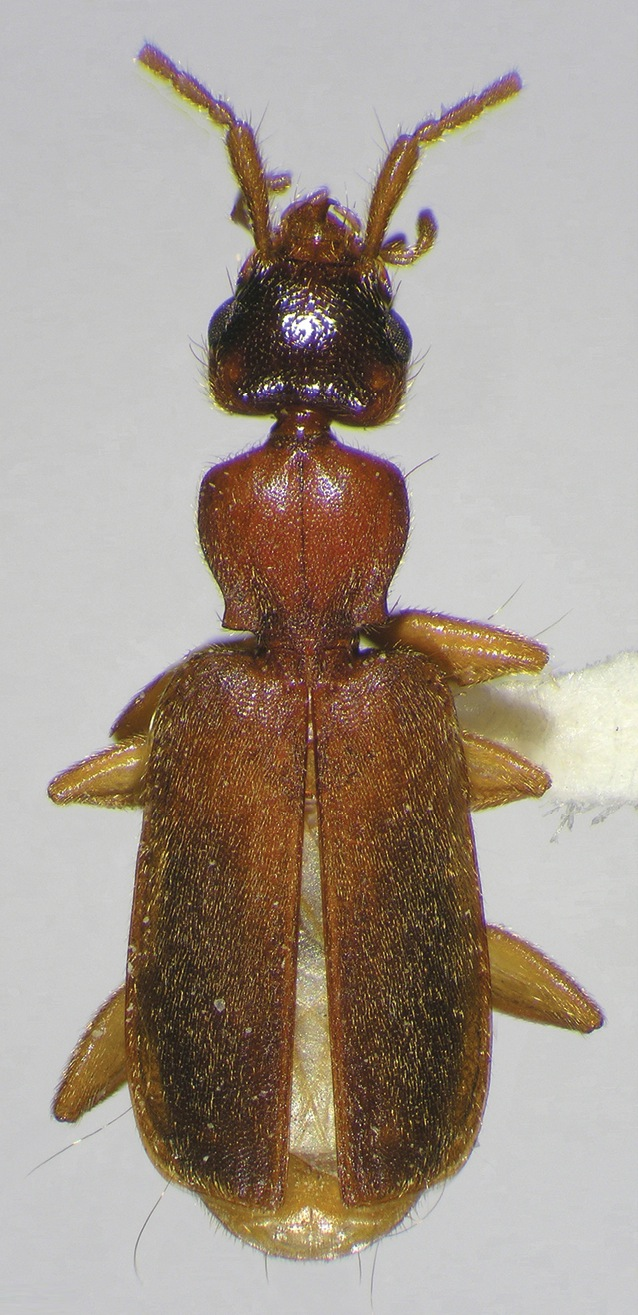

Scientific classification
- Domain: Eukaryota
- Kingdom: Animalia
- Phylum: Arthropoda
- Class: Insecta
- Order: Coleoptera
- Suborder: Adephaga
- Family: Carabidae
- Genus: Zuphioides
- Species: Z. mexicanum

Binomial name
- Zuphioides mexicanum (Chaudoir, 1863)

Synonyms
- Zuphium mexicanum

= Zuphioides mexicanum =

Species of beetle

Zuphioides mexicanum is a species in the beetle family Carabidae. It is found in the United States and Mexico.
