= Eunostus (beetle) =

Scientific classification
- Domain: Eukaryota
- Kingdom: Animalia
- Phylum: Arthropoda
- Class: Insecta
- Order: Coleoptera
- Suborder: Adephaga
- Family: Carabidae
- Subfamily: Dryptinae
- Tribe: Galeritini
- Genus: Eunostus; Laporte, 1835

Genus of beetles

Eunostus is a genus of in the beetle family Carabidae. There are about 15 described species in Eunostus, found in Africa.

== Species ==
These 15 species belong to the genus Eunostus:

- Eunostus allardi Basilewsky, 1957 (Democratic Republic of the Congo)
- Eunostus burgeoni Alluaud, 1919 (Guinea-Bissau, Guinea, Ivory Coast, Togo, Gabon, Democratic Republic of the Congo)
- Eunostus chappuisi Alluaud, 1936 (Sierra Leone, Ivory Coast, Rwanda, Zambia)
- Eunostus crampeli Alluaud, 1919 (Ivory Coast, Central African Republic, Gabon)
- Eunostus guieinzii Chaudoir, 1862 (Democratic Republic of the Congo, Tanzania, Mozambique, Zimbabwe, Botswana, South Africa)
- Eunostus guineensis Straneo, 1943 (Guinea-Bissau, Guinea, Democratic Republic of the Congo)
- Eunostus harrarensis Alluaud, 1919 (Somalia and Kenya)
- Eunostus insignis Alluaud, 1919 (Madagascar)
- Eunostus latreillei Laporte, 1835 (Madagascar)
- Eunostus milloti Jeannel, 1949 (Madagascar)
- Eunostus minimus Kavanaugh & Rainio, 2016 (Madagascar)
- Eunostus perrieri Jeannel, 1949 (Madagascar)
- Eunostus puncticeps Basilewsky, 1957 (Democratic Republic of the Congo)
- Eunostus sicardi Jeannel, 1949 (Madagascar)
- Eunostus vuilleti Alluaud, 1919 (Senegal/ Gambia, Guinea, Niger, Democratic Republic of the Congo)
