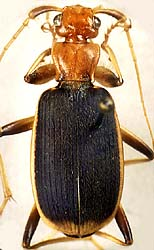

Scientific classification
- Kingdom: Animalia
- Phylum: Arthropoda
- Class: Insecta
- Order: Coleoptera
- Suborder: Adephaga
- Family: Carabidae
- Subfamily: Dryptinae
- Tribe: Galeritini
- Genus: Trichognatha; Latreille, 1829
- Species: T. marginipennis

Binomial name
- Trichognatha marginipennis Latreille, 1829

Synonyms
- Trichognathus

= Trichognatha =

Genus of beetles

Trichognatha is a genus in the beetle family Carabidae. This genus has a single species, Trichognatha marginipennis, found in South America.
