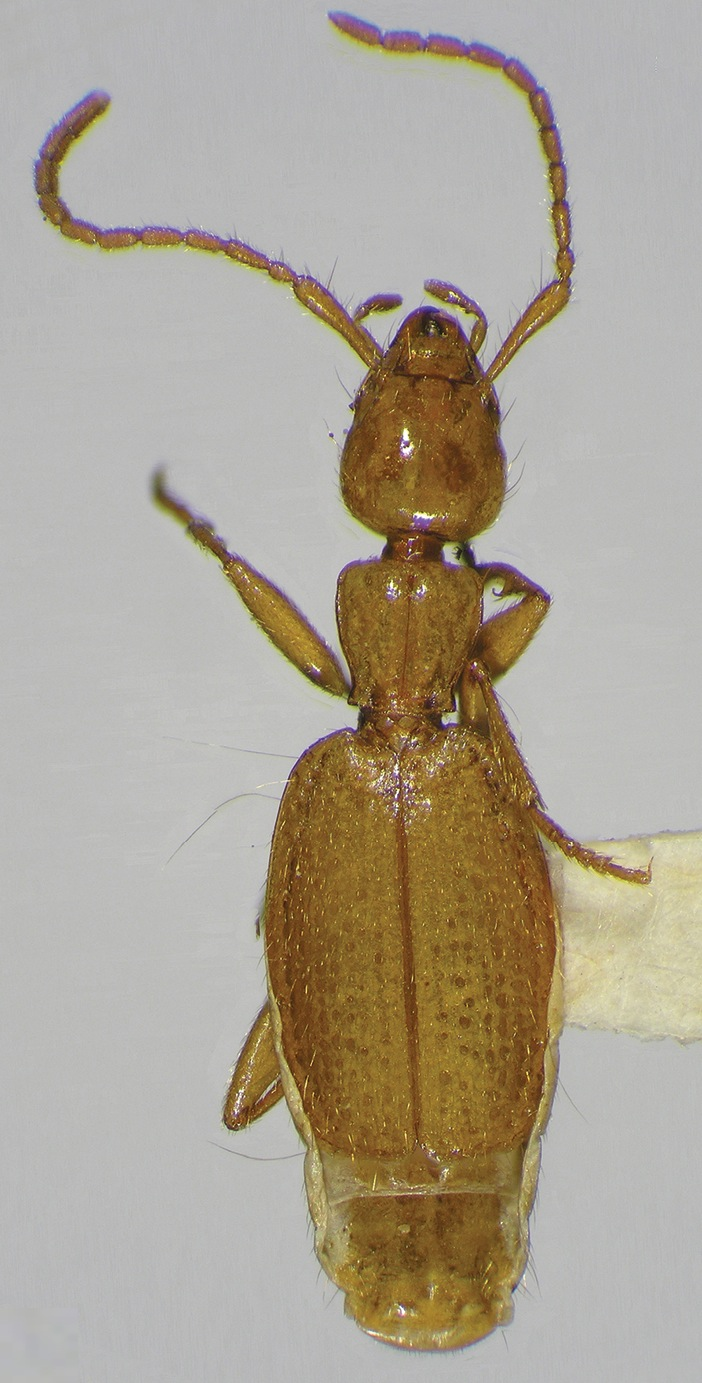
- Coarazuphium whiteheadi

Scientific classification
- Domain: Eukaryota
- Kingdom: Animalia
- Phylum: Arthropoda
- Class: Insecta
- Order: Coleoptera
- Suborder: Adephaga
- Family: Carabidae
- Subfamily: Dryptinae
- Tribe: Zuphiini
- Genus: Coarazuphium; Gnaspini, Vanin & Godoy, 1998

= Coarazuphium =

Genus of beetles

Coarazuphium is a genus in the beetle family Carabidae. There are about 12 described species in Coarazuphium.

== Species ==
These 12 species belong to the genus Coarazuphium:

- Coarazuphium amazonicum Pellegrini & Ferreira, 2017 (Brazil)
- Coarazuphium bezerra Gnaspini, Vanin & Godoy, 1998 (Brazil)
- Coarazuphium caatinga Pellegrini & Ferreira, 2014 (Brazil)
- Coarazuphium cessaima Gnaspini, Vanin & Godoy, 1998 (Brazil)
- Coarazuphium formoso Pellegrini & Ferreira, 2011 (Brazil)
- Coarazuphium lundi Pellegrini, Ferreira, Zampaulo & Vieira, 2020 (Brazil)
- Coarazuphium pains Alvares & Ferreira, 2002 (Brazil)
- Coarazuphium ricardoi Cassia Bená & Vanin, 2014 (Brazil)
- Coarazuphium spinifemur Pellegrini & Ferreira, 2017 (Brazil)
- Coarazuphium tapiaguassu Pellegrini & Ferreira, 2011 (Brazil)
- Coarazuphium tessai (Godoy & Vanin, 1990) (Brazil)
- Coarazuphium whiteheadi Ball & Shpeley, 2013 (Mexico)
