= Ancystroglossus =

Scientific classification
- Kingdom: Animalia
- Phylum: Arthropoda
- Class: Insecta
- Order: Coleoptera
- Suborder: Adephaga
- Family: Carabidae
- Subfamily: Dryptinae
- Genus: Ancystroglossus; Chaudoir, 1862

Genus of beetles

Ancystroglossus is a genus of beetles in the family Carabidae, containing the following species:

- Ancystroglossus deplanatus Reichardt, 1967
- Ancystroglossus dimidiaticornis Chaudoir, 1863
- Ancystroglossus gracilis Chaudoir, 1863
- Ancystroglossus ovalipennis Reichardt, 1967
- Ancystroglossus punctatus Reichardt, 1967
- Ancystroglossus strangulatus Chaudoir, 1863
