= Paraleleupidia =

Scientific classification
- Domain: Eukaryota
- Kingdom: Animalia
- Phylum: Arthropoda
- Class: Insecta
- Order: Coleoptera
- Suborder: Adephaga
- Family: Carabidae
- Subfamily: Dryptinae
- Tribe: Zuphiini
- Subtribe: Leleupidiina
- Genus: Paraleleupidia; Basilewsky, 1951

Subgenera
- Megaleleupidia Mateu, 1981; Paraleleupidia Basilewsky, 1951

Genus of beetles

Paraleleupidia is a genus in the beetle family Carabidae. There are more than 20 described species in Paraleleupidia, found in Africa and India.

== Species ==
These 27 species belong to the genus Paraleleupidia:

- Paraleleupidia acutangula Basilewsky & Mateu, 1977 (Cameroon)
- Paraleleupidia besucheti Mateu, 1981 (India)
- Paraleleupidia bueana Basilewsky & Mateu, 1977 (Cameroon)
- Paraleleupidia bunyakira Basilewsky, 1955 (Democratic Republic of the Congo)
- Paraleleupidia bururiana Basilewsky, 1953 (Burundi)
- Paraleleupidia camerunensis Basilewsky & Mateu, 1977 (Cameroon)
- Paraleleupidia castanea Basilewsky & Mateu, 1977 (Cameroon)
- Paraleleupidia celisi Basilewsky, 1964 (Democratic Republic of the Congo)
- Paraleleupidia cribrata (Basilewsky, 1951) (Democratic Republic of the Congo)
- Paraleleupidia decellei Basilewsky, 1962 (Democratic Republic of the Congo)
- Paraleleupidia exarata Basilewsky, 1960 (Democratic Republic of the Congo)
- Paraleleupidia franzi Basilewsky, 1964 (Congo (Brazzaville))
- Paraleleupidia joannae Basilewsky, 1962 (Democratic Republic of the Congo)
- Paraleleupidia laticollis Basilewsky, 1953 (Democratic Republic of the Congo)
- Paraleleupidia linearis Baehr, 1990 (India)
- Paraleleupidia loebli Mateu, 1981 (India)
- Paraleleupidia mirei Basilewsky & Mateu, 1977 (Cameroon)
- Paraleleupidia montana Basilewsky & Mateu, 1977 (Cameroon)
- Paraleleupidia nimbana (Basilewsky, 1953) (Guinea)
- Paraleleupidia nyakagerana Basilewsky, 1956 (Democratic Republic of the Congo)
- Paraleleupidia penalis Basilewsky & Mateu, 1977 (Cameroon)
- Paraleleupidia prominens Basilewsky, 1956 (Democratic Republic of the Congo)
- Paraleleupidia ruwenzorica Basilewsky, 1964 (Democratic Republic of the Congo)
- Paraleleupidia spinicollis Basilewsky, 1953 (Democratic Republic of the Congo)
- Paraleleupidia sylvicola Basilewsky & Mateu, 1977 (Cameroon)
- Paraleleupidia uluguruana Basilewsky, 1962 (Tanzania)
- Paraleleupidia uvirana Basilewsky, 1962 (Democratic Republic of the Congo)
