= Pseudaptinus lecontei =

Scientific classification
- Kingdom: Animalia
- Phylum: Arthropoda
- Class: Insecta
- Order: Coleoptera
- Suborder: Adephaga
- Family: Carabidae
- Genus: Pseudaptinus
- Species: P. lecontei

Binomial name
- Pseudaptinus lecontei (Dejean, 1831)

Species of beetle

Pseudaptinus lecontei is a species of ground beetle in the family Carabidae. It is found in North America.
