= Chaudoirella =

Scientific classification
- Kingdom: Animalia
- Phylum: Arthropoda
- Class: Insecta
- Order: Coleoptera
- Suborder: Adephaga
- Family: Carabidae
- Subfamily: Dryptinae
- Tribe: Zuphiini
- Subtribe: Zuphiina
- Genus: Chaudoirella; Mateu, 1982
- Species: C. reichardti

Binomial name
- Chaudoirella reichardti Mateu, 1982

Genus of beetles

Chaudoirella is a genus in the ground beetle family Carabidae. This genus has a single species, Chaudoirella reichardti.
