= Gunvorita =

Scientific classification
- Domain: Eukaryota
- Kingdom: Animalia
- Phylum: Arthropoda
- Class: Insecta
- Order: Coleoptera
- Suborder: Adephaga
- Family: Carabidae
- Subfamily: Dryptinae
- Tribe: Zuphiini
- Subtribe: Leleupidiina
- Genus: Gunvorita; Landin, 1955

Genus of beetles

Gunvorita is a genus of carabids in the beetle family Carabidae. There are more than 20 described species in Gunvorita, found in Nepal and India.

== Species ==
These 21 species belong to the genus Gunvorita:

- Gunvorita angusticeps Baehr, 1998 (Nepal)
- Gunvorita apicalis Baehr, 2001 (Nepal)
- Gunvorita besucheti Baehr, 1998 (India)
- Gunvorita bihamata Baehr, 2002 (Nepal)
- Gunvorita denticulata Baehr, 2001 (Nepal)
- Gunvorita depressipennis Baehr, 1998 (India)
- Gunvorita distinguenda Baehr, 2001 (Nepal)
- Gunvorita elegans Landin, 1955 (Nepal, India)
- Gunvorita globipalpis Baehr, 2001 (Nepal)
- Gunvorita hamifera Baehr, 1998 (Nepal)
- Gunvorita indica Darlington, 1968 (India)
- Gunvorita inermis Baehr, 1998 (India)
- Gunvorita laeviceps Baehr, 1998 (India)
- Gunvorita martensi Casale, 1985 (Nepal)
- Gunvorita minor Baehr, 1998 (India)
- Gunvorita nepalensis Baehr, 1998 (Nepal)
- Gunvorita ovaliceps Baehr, 1998 (India)
- Gunvorita punctipennis Baehr, 1998 (Nepal)
- Gunvorita schawalleri Baehr, 1998 (Nepal)
- Gunvorita smetanai Baehr, 1998 (Nepal)
- Gunvorita uncinata Baehr, 1998 (Nepal)
