= Dicrodontus =

Scientific classification
- Domain: Eukaryota
- Kingdom: Animalia
- Phylum: Arthropoda
- Class: Insecta
- Order: Coleoptera
- Suborder: Adephaga
- Family: Carabidae
- Subfamily: Dryptinae
- Tribe: Zuphiini
- Subtribe: Dicrodontina
- Genus: Dicrodontus; Chaudoir, 1872

Synonyms
- Dichrodontus

Genus of beetles

Dicrodontus is a genus in the ground beetle family Carabidae. There are at least three described species in Dicrodontus, found in the Canary Islands.

== Species ==
These three species belong to the genus Dicrodontus:

- Dicrodontus alluaudi Mateu, 1952
- Dicrodontus aptinoides (Wollaston, 1865)
- Dicrodontus brunneus (Dejean, 1831)
