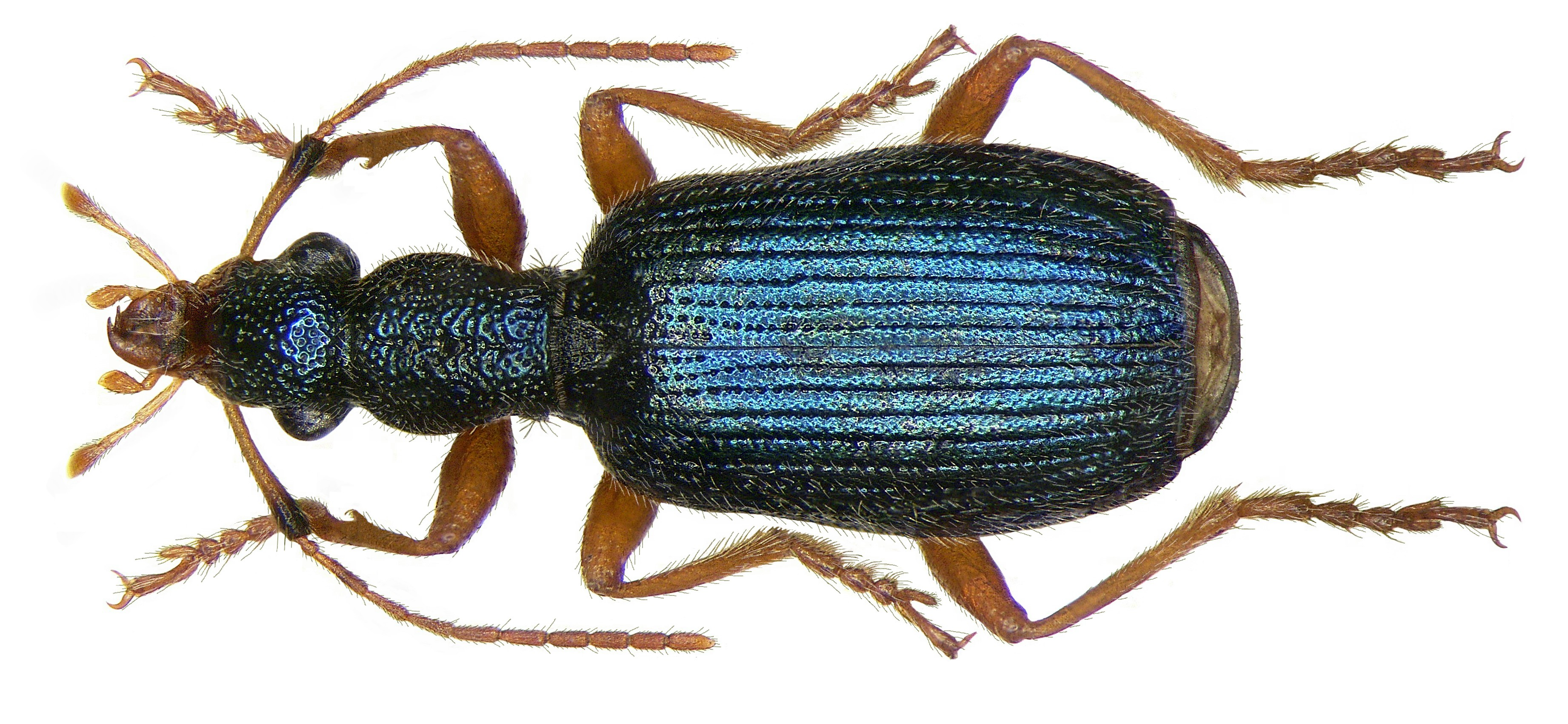

Scientific classification
- Kingdom: Animalia
- Phylum: Arthropoda
- Clade: Pancrustacea
- Class: Insecta
- Order: Coleoptera
- Suborder: Adephaga
- Family: Carabidae
- Genus: Drypta
- Species: D. dentata

Binomial name
- Drypta dentata Rossi, 1790

Synonyms
- Drypta emarginata Olivier, 1790

= Drypta dentata =

Species of beetle

Drypta dentata is a species of ground beetle in the genus Drypta.
