= Neoleleupidia =

Scientific classification
- Domain: Eukaryota
- Kingdom: Animalia
- Phylum: Arthropoda
- Class: Insecta
- Order: Coleoptera
- Suborder: Adephaga
- Family: Carabidae
- Tribe: Zuphiini
- Subtribe: Leleupidiina
- Genus: Neoleleupidia; Basilewsky, 1953
- Species: N. kochi

Binomial name
- Neoleleupidia kochi Basilewsky, 1953

Genus of beetles

Neoleleupidia is a genus in the ground beetle family Carabidae. This genus has a single species, Neoleleupidia kochi. It is found in the Democratic Republic of the Congo.
