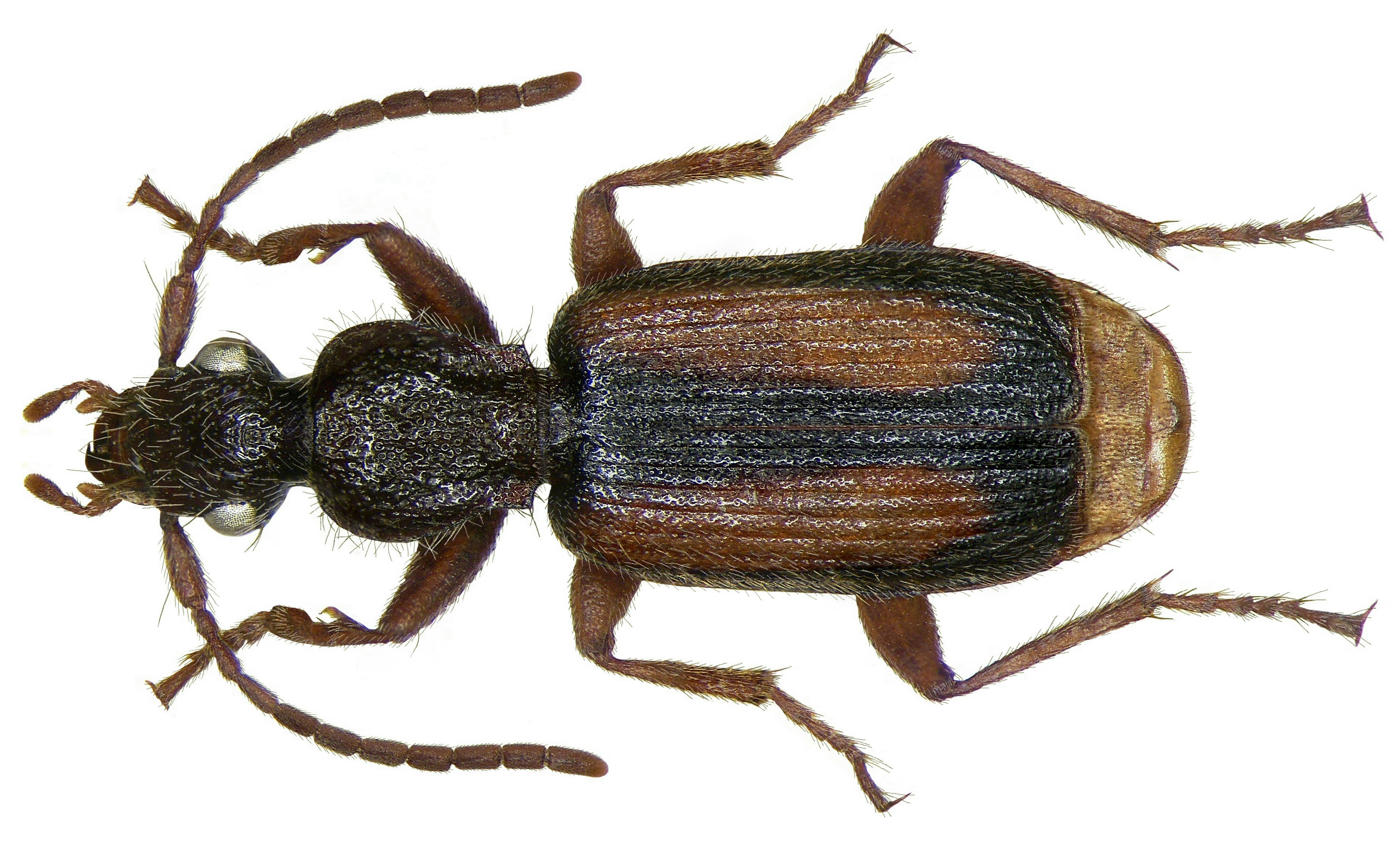

Scientific classification
- Kingdom: Animalia
- Phylum: Arthropoda
- Class: Insecta
- Order: Coleoptera
- Suborder: Adephaga
- Family: Carabidae
- Subfamily: Dryptinae
- Genus: Polistichus; Bonelli, 1810

= Polistichus =

Genus of beetles

Polistichus is a genus of beetles in the family Carabidae, containing the following species:

- Polistichus connexus (Geoffroy, 1785)
- Polistichus fasciolatus (P. Rossi, 1790)
- Polistichus inornatus Gestro, 1881
