= Speothalpius =

Scientific classification
- Domain: Eukaryota
- Kingdom: Animalia
- Phylum: Arthropoda
- Class: Insecta
- Order: Coleoptera
- Suborder: Adephaga
- Family: Carabidae
- Tribe: Zuphiini
- Subtribe: Zuphiina
- Genus: Speothalpius; B.Moore, 1995
- Species: S. grayi

Binomial name
- Speothalpius grayi B.Moore, 1995

Genus of beetles

Speothalpius is a genus in the ground beetle family Carabidae. This genus has a single species, Speothalpius grayi. It is found in Australia.
