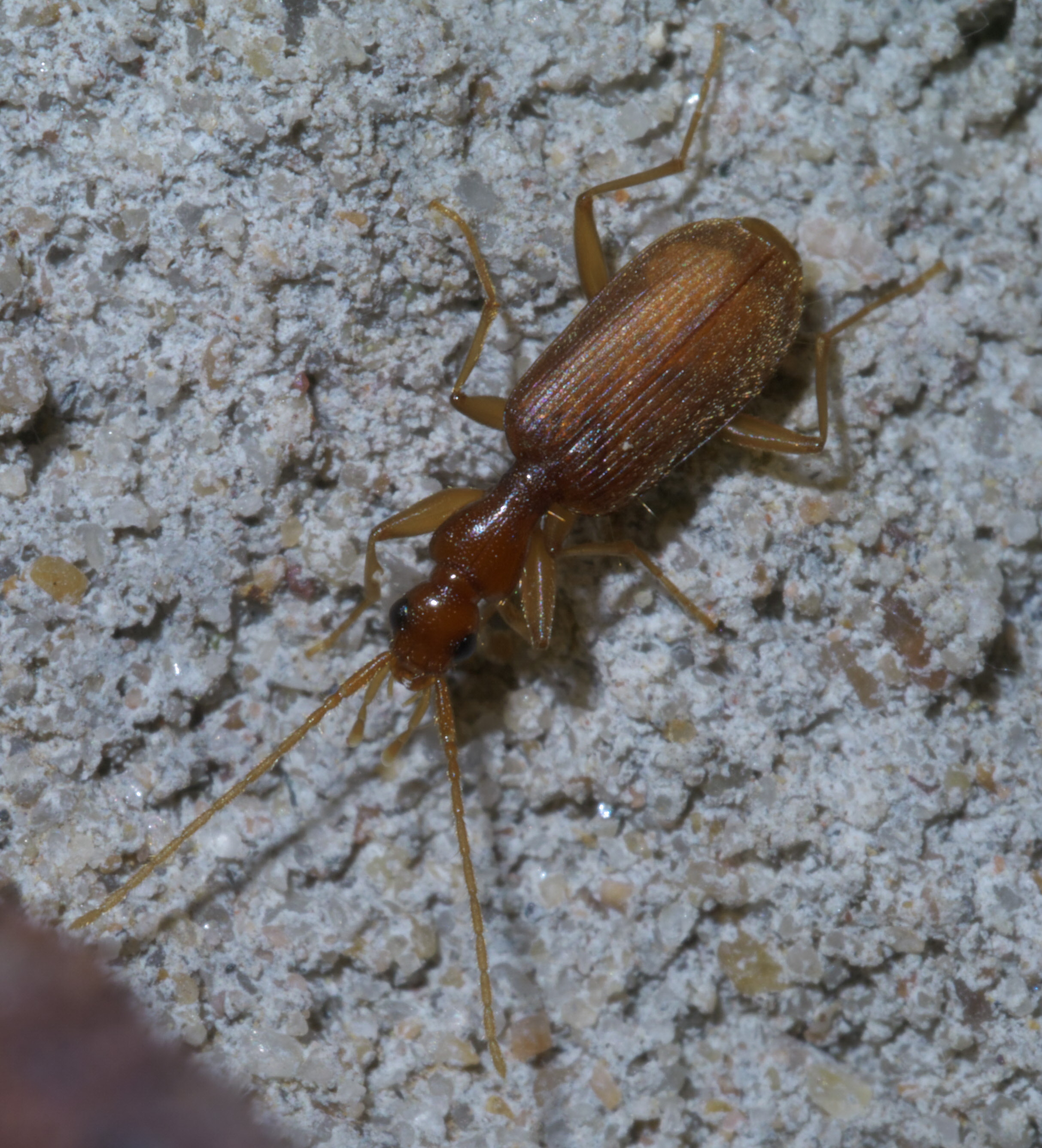
- In Oklahoma, US

Scientific classification
- Kingdom: Animalia
- Phylum: Arthropoda
- Clade: Pancrustacea
- Class: Insecta
- Order: Coleoptera
- Suborder: Adephaga
- Family: Carabidae
- Subfamily: Dryptinae
- Tribe: Zuphiini
- Genus: Pseudaptinus; Laporte, 1834

Subgenera
- Pseudaptinus Laporte, 1834; Thalpius LeConte, 1851

= Pseudaptinus =

Genus of beetles

Pseudaptinus is a genus in the beetle family Carabidae. There are more than 50 described species in the genus Pseudaptinus.

== Species ==
These 54 species belong to the genus Pseudaptinus:

- Pseudaptinus albicornis (Klug, 1834) (Brazil)
- Pseudaptinus apicalis Darlington, 1934 (Cuba)
- Pseudaptinus aptinoides Liebke, 1934 (Venezuela)
- Pseudaptinus argentinicus Liebke, 1929 (Argentina)
- Pseudaptinus arrogans Liebke, 1934 (Cuba)
- Pseudaptinus australis (Blackburn, 1889) (Australia)
- Pseudaptinus batesii (Chaudoir, 1863) (Brazil)
- Pseudaptinus bierigi Liebke, 1934 (Cuba)
- Pseudaptinus borgmeieri Liebke, 1939 (Argentina)
- Pseudaptinus brittoni Baehr, 1985 (Australia)
- Pseudaptinus bruchi Liebke, 1934 (Argentina)
- Pseudaptinus brunneus Liebke, 1934 (Argentina)
- Pseudaptinus championi Liebke, 1934 (Panama)
- Pseudaptinus cribratus Liebke, 1934
- Pseudaptinus cubanus (Chaudoir, 1877) (United States and Cuba)
- Pseudaptinus cyclophthalmus Baehr, 1985 (Australia)
- Pseudaptinus deceptor Darlington, 1934 (United States and Cuba)
- Pseudaptinus depressipennis Baehr, 1995 (Australia)
- Pseudaptinus dorsalis (Brullé, 1834) (Cuba and United States)
- Pseudaptinus elegans (Chaudoir, 1863) (Brazil and Panama)
- Pseudaptinus fluvialis Liebke, 1934 (Argentina and Brazil)
- Pseudaptinus fulvus (Laporte, 1867) (Australia)
- Pseudaptinus granulosus (Chaudoir, 1872) (Brazil)
- Pseudaptinus gregoryensis Baehr, 2008 (Australia)
- Pseudaptinus hirsutulus Baehr, 1985 (Australia)
- Pseudaptinus hoegei (Bates, 1883) (United States and Mexico)
- Pseudaptinus horni (Chaudoir, 1872) (United States)
- Pseudaptinus insularis Mutchler, 1934 (the Lesser Antilles and Cuba)
- Pseudaptinus intermedius (Chaudoir, 1872) (Colombia)
- Pseudaptinus iridescens Baehr, 1985 (Australia)
- Pseudaptinus lecontei (Dejean, 1831) (United States)
- Pseudaptinus leprieuri (Buquet, 1835) (French Guiana)
- Pseudaptinus lugubris Liebke, 1934 (Bolivia)
- Pseudaptinus magicus Liebke, 1934 (Mexico)
- Pseudaptinus marginicollis Darlington, 1934 (Hispaniola and Cuba)
- Pseudaptinus microcephalus (Van Dyke, 1926) (United States)
- Pseudaptinus mimicus Liebke, 1934 (Argentina)
- Pseudaptinus monteithi Baehr, 1985 (Australia)
- Pseudaptinus nevermanni Liebke, 1936 (Costa Rica)
- Pseudaptinus nobilis Liebke, 1934 (United States, Costa Rica, Mexico)
- Pseudaptinus ohausi Liebke, 1934 (Ecuador)
- Pseudaptinus oviceps Van Dyke, 1926 (United States)
- Pseudaptinus parallelus Baehr, 2008 (Australia)
- Pseudaptinus plaumanni Liebke, 1939 (Brazil)
- Pseudaptinus polystichoides (Chaudoir, 1863) (Brazil)
- Pseudaptinus punctatostriatus Baehr, 1985 (Australia)
- Pseudaptinus punctatus Liebke, 1934 (Brazil)
- Pseudaptinus pygmaeus (Dejean, 1826) (United States)
- Pseudaptinus rufulus (LeConte, 1851) (United States)
- Pseudaptinus salebrosus Liebke, 1934 (Cuba)
- Pseudaptinus simplex Liebke, 1934 (Mexico)
- Pseudaptinus subfasciatus (Chaudoir, 1863) (Brazil)
- Pseudaptinus tenuicollis (LeConte, 1851) (United States and Mexico)
- Pseudaptinus thaxteri Darlington, 1934 (the Lesser Antilles)
