= Speozuphium =

Scientific classification
- Domain: Eukaryota
- Kingdom: Animalia
- Phylum: Arthropoda
- Class: Insecta
- Order: Coleoptera
- Suborder: Adephaga
- Family: Carabidae
- Tribe: Zuphiini
- Subtribe: Zuphiina
- Genus: Speozuphium; B.Moore, 1995
- Species: S. poultieri

Binomial name
- Speozuphium poultieri B.Moore, 1995

Genus of beetles

Speozuphium is a genus in the ground beetle family Carabidae. This genus has a single species, Speozuphium poultieri. It is found in Australia.
