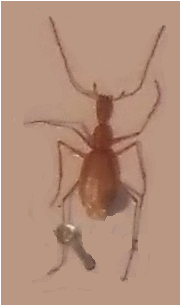

Scientific classification
- Domain: Eukaryota
- Kingdom: Animalia
- Phylum: Arthropoda
- Class: Insecta
- Order: Coleoptera
- Suborder: Adephaga
- Family: Carabidae
- Tribe: Zuphiini
- Subtribe: Zuphiina
- Genus: Ildobates; Español, 1966
- Species: I. neboti

Binomial name
- Ildobates neboti Español, 1966

= Ildobates =

Genus of beetles

Ildobates is a genus in the ground beetle family Carabidae. This genus has a single species, Ildobates neboti. It is found in Spain.
