= Leleupidia =

Scientific classification
- Kingdom: Animalia
- Phylum: Arthropoda
- Class: Insecta
- Order: Coleoptera
- Suborder: Adephaga
- Family: Carabidae
- Subfamily: Dryptinae
- Genus: Leleupidia; Basilewsky, 1951

Genus of beetles

Leleupidia is a genus of beetles in the family Carabidae, containing the following species:

- Leleupidia angusticollis Basilewsky, 1953
- Leleupidia coiffaiti Mateu, 1970
- Leleupidia elilae Basilewsky, 1960
- Leleupidia emerita Basilewsky, 1951
- Leleupidia grossepunctata Basilewsky, 1953
- Leleupidia kaboboana Basilewsky, 1960
- Leleupidia kahuziana Basilewsky, 1953
- Leleupidia luvubuana Basilewsky, 1951
- Leleupidia ruandana Basilewsky, 1951
- Leleupidia vadoni Basilewsky, 1967
