= Mischocephalus =

Scientific classification
- Domain: Eukaryota
- Kingdom: Animalia
- Phylum: Arthropoda
- Class: Insecta
- Order: Coleoptera
- Suborder: Adephaga
- Family: Carabidae
- Tribe: Zuphiini
- Subtribe: Zuphiina
- Genus: Mischocephalus; Chaudoir, 1863
- Species: M. spinicollis

Binomial name
- Mischocephalus spinicollis Chaudoir, 1863

Genus of beetles

Mischocephalus is a genus in the beetle family Carabidae. This genus has a single species, Mischocephalus spinicollis. It is found in Colombia, Venezuela, Brazil, and Panama.
