= Agastus =

Scientific classification
- Kingdom: Animalia
- Phylum: Arthropoda
- Class: Insecta
- Order: Coleoptera
- Suborder: Adephaga
- Family: Carabidae
- Subfamily: Dryptinae
- Genus: Agastus; Schmidt-Goebel, 1846

Genus of beetles

Agastus is a genus of beetles in the family Carabidae, containing the following species:

- Agastus alternatus (Basilewsky, 1962)
- Agastus biseriatus Baehr, 1987
- Agastus congoanus (Basilewsky, 1960)
- Agastus fuscatus (Liebke, 1937)
- Agastus gabonicus (Mateu, 1970)
- Agastus hirsutus Baehr, 1985
- Agastus kivuanus (Basilewsky, 1960)
- Agastus lineatus Schmidt-Goebel, 1846
- Agastus ustulatus Gestro, 1875
- Agastus zuphoides (Alluaud, 1931)
