= Metazuphium =

Scientific classification
- Domain: Eukaryota
- Kingdom: Animalia
- Phylum: Arthropoda
- Class: Insecta
- Order: Coleoptera
- Suborder: Adephaga
- Family: Carabidae
- Tribe: Zuphiini
- Subtribe: Zuphiina
- Genus: Metazuphium; Mateu, 1992
- Species: M. spinangulis

Binomial name
- Metazuphium spinangulis Mateu, 1992

Genus of beetles

Metazuphium is a genus in the ground beetle family Carabidae. This genus has a single species, Metazuphium spinangulis. It is found in Sri Lanka.
