= Metaxidius =

Scientific classification
- Domain: Eukaryota
- Kingdom: Animalia
- Phylum: Arthropoda
- Class: Insecta
- Order: Coleoptera
- Suborder: Adephaga
- Family: Carabidae
- Tribe: Zuphiini
- Subtribe: Zuphiina
- Genus: Metaxidius; Chaudoir, 1852
- Species: M. brunnipenis

Binomial name
- Metaxidius brunnipenis Chaudoir, 1852

Genus of beetles

Metaxidius is a genus in the ground beetle family Carabidae. This genus has a single species, Metaxidius brunnipenis.
