= Neodrypta =

Scientific classification
- Domain: Eukaryota
- Kingdom: Animalia
- Phylum: Arthropoda
- Class: Insecta
- Order: Coleoptera
- Suborder: Adephaga
- Family: Carabidae
- Tribe: Dryptini
- Genus: Neodrypta; Basilewsky, 1960
- Species: N. costigera

Binomial name
- Neodrypta costigera (Chaudoir, 1861)

Genus of beetles

Neodrypta is a genus in the ground beetle family Carabidae. This genus has a single species, Neodrypta costigera. It is found in Peru and Brazil.
