= Acrogenys =

Scientific classification
- Kingdom: Animalia
- Phylum: Arthropoda
- Class: Insecta
- Order: Coleoptera
- Suborder: Adephaga
- Family: Carabidae
- Subfamily: Dryptinae
- Genus: Acrogenys; Macleay, 1864

Genus of beetles

Acrogenys is a genus of beetles in the family Carabidae, containing the following species:

- Acrogenys centralis Baehr, 1992
- Acrogenys demarzi Baehr, 1984
- Acrogenys hirsuta Macleay, 1864
- Acrogenys jabiruensis Baehr, 2001
- Acrogenys laticollis Baehr, 1984
- Acrogenys longicollis Gestro, 1875
- Acrogenys lucai Baehr, 2001
- Acrogenys sumlin Baehr, 2001
