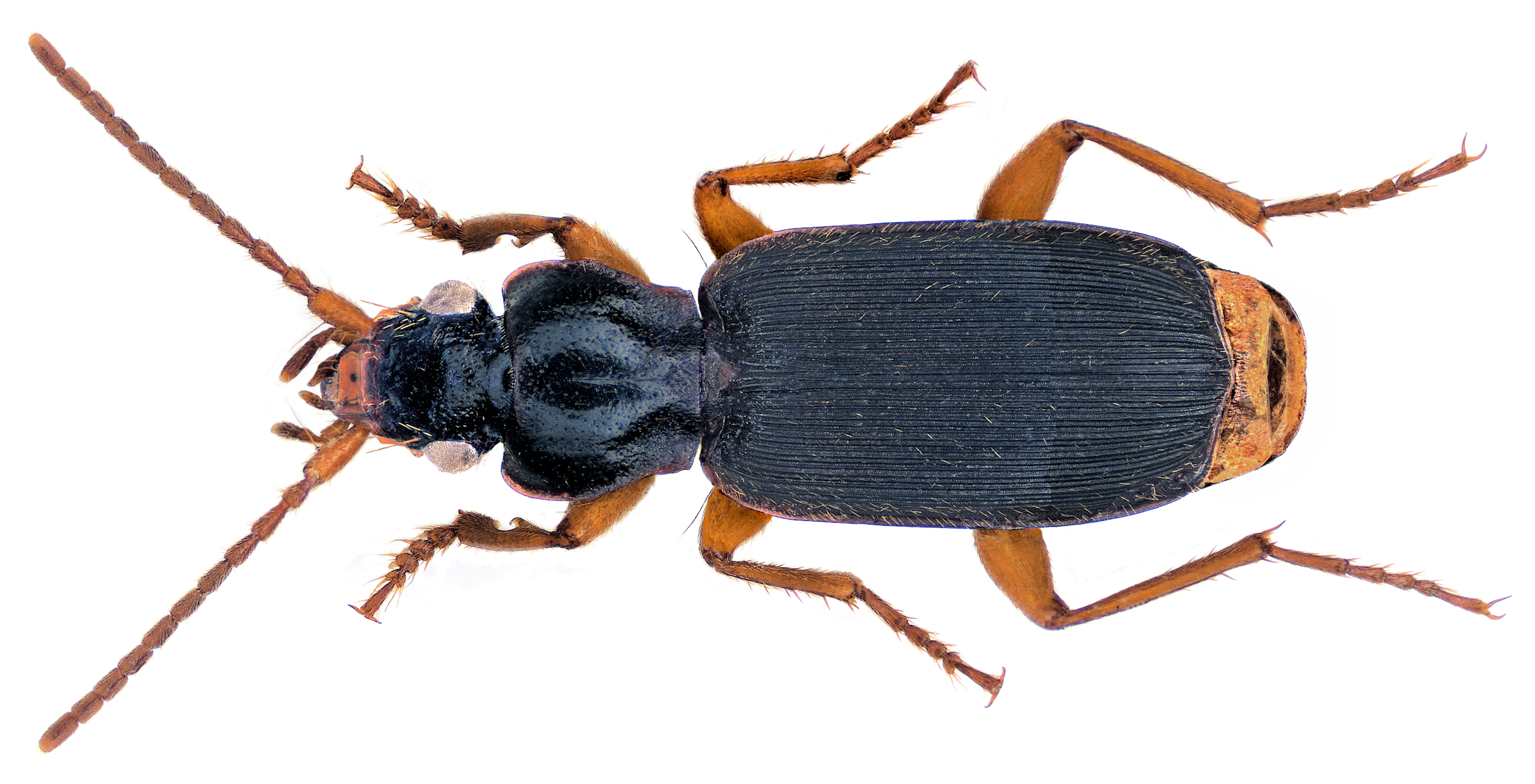

Scientific classification
- Domain: Eukaryota
- Kingdom: Animalia
- Phylum: Arthropoda
- Class: Insecta
- Order: Coleoptera
- Suborder: Adephaga
- Family: Carabidae
- Genus: Planetes; W. S. MacLeay, 1825

= Planetes (beetle) =

Genus of beetles

Planetes is a genus of beetles in the family Carabidae, containing the following species:

- Planetes angusticollis Baehr, 1986
- Planetes australis (W.J. Macleay, 1871)
- Planetes bimaculatus W.S. Macleay, 1825
- Planetes bipartitus Basilewsky, 1963
- Planetes congobelgicus Basilewsky, 1963
- Planetes cordens Darlington, 1968
- Planetes elegans (Nietner, 1857)
- Planetes formosanus Jedlicka, 1939
- Planetes gerardi Borgeon, 1937
- Planetes humeralis Darlington, 1968
- Planetes indicus Andrewes, 1922
- Planetes kasaharai Habu, 1978
- Planetes limbatus Peringuey, 1896
- Planetes lineolatus Putzeys, 1880
- Planetes magelae Baehr, 1986
- Planetes millstreamensis Baehr, 1986
- Planetes minimus Jedlicka, 1936
- Planetes muiri Andrewes, 1924
- Planetes multicostulatus Basilewsky, 1954
- Planetes obiensis Louwerens, 1956
- Planetes pendleburyi Andrewes, 1929
- Planetes puncticeps Andrewes, 1919
- Planetes quadricollis Chaudoir, 1878
- Planetes ruficeps Schaum, 1863
- Planetes ruficollis (Nietner, 1857)
- Planetes secernendus Oberthur, 1883
- Planetes simplex Bates, 1886
