= Ophonus puncticeps =

Scientific classification
- Domain: Eukaryota
- Kingdom: Animalia
- Phylum: Arthropoda
- Class: Insecta
- Order: Coleoptera
- Suborder: Adephaga
- Family: Carabidae
- Subfamily: Harpalinae
- Tribe: Harpalini
- Genus: Ophonus
- Species: O. puncticeps

Binomial name
- Ophonus puncticeps Stephens, 1828

Synonyms
- Harpalus angusticollis G. Muller, 1921; Harpalus orientis Schauberger, 1926

Species of beetle

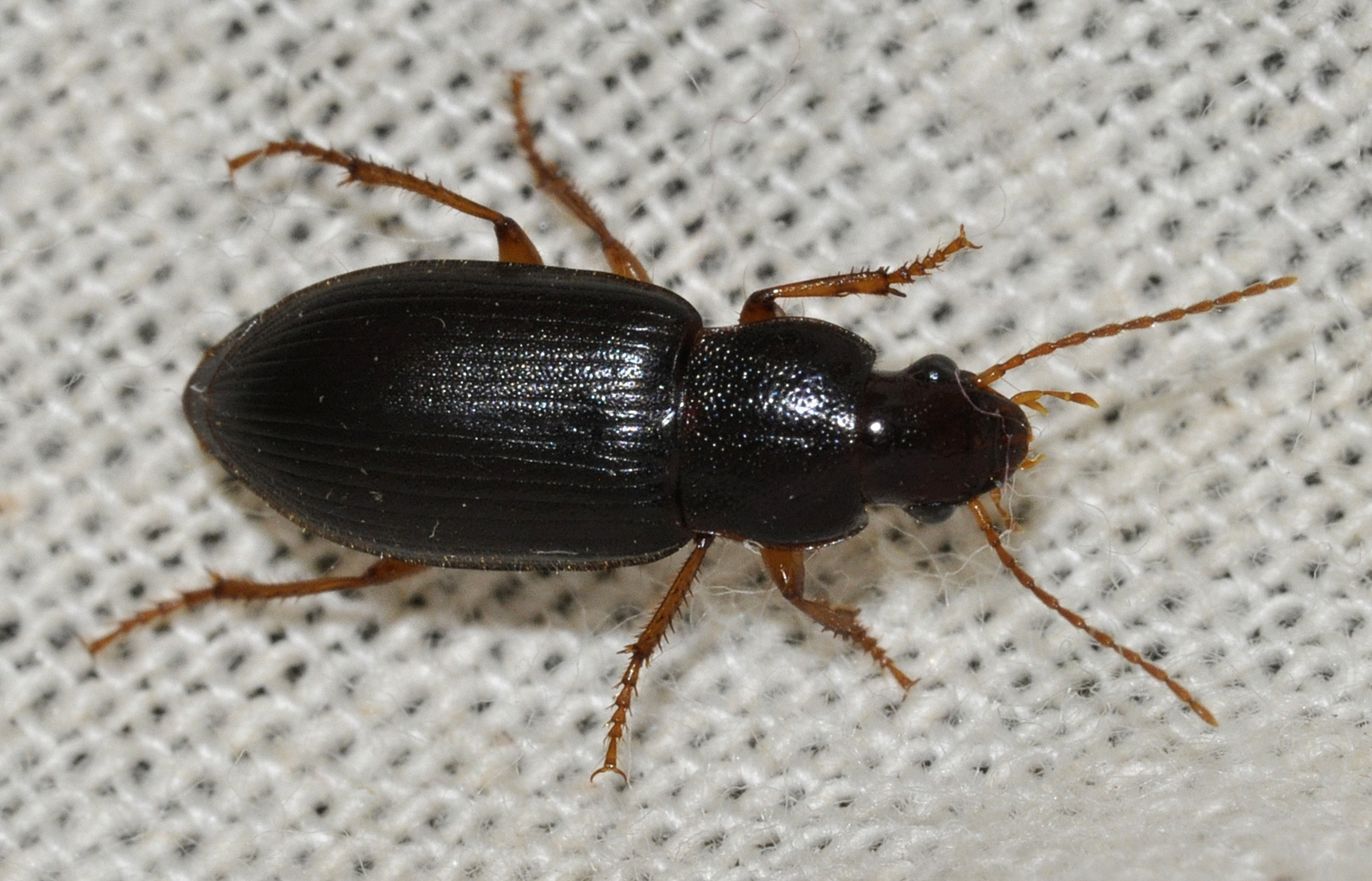
Ophonus puncticeps

Ophonus puncticeps is a species of ruderal ground beetle native to the Palearctic realm, including Europe and the Near East.

== Description ==
The species is black coloured with brownish legs and antennas. It is phytophagous and is 6.5–9 millimetres (0.26–0.35 in) long.

== Distribution ==
In Ireland, it was believed to be found in Belfast, where it was first found in 1902. At first, it turned out to be Harpalus puncticollis, a species described by Paykull in the same year. But, later on it was confirmed that it was actually Ophonus rufibarbis.
