= Ophonus wrasei =

Scientific classification
- Domain: Eukaryota
- Kingdom: Animalia
- Phylum: Arthropoda
- Class: Insecta
- Order: Coleoptera
- Suborder: Adephaga
- Family: Carabidae
- Subfamily: Harpalinae
- Tribe: Harpalini
- Genus: Ophonus
- Species: O. wrasei

Binomial name
- Ophonus wrasei Sciaky, 1987

Species of beetle

Ophonus wrasei is a species of ground beetle in the subfamily Harpalinae, genus Ophonus, and subgenus Ophonus (Metophonus).
