= Ophonus puncticollis =

Scientific classification
- Kingdom: Animalia
- Phylum: Arthropoda
- Clade: Pancrustacea
- Class: Insecta
- Order: Coleoptera
- Suborder: Adephaga
- Family: Carabidae
- Genus: Ophonus
- Species: O. puncticollis

Binomial name
- Ophonus puncticollis Paykull, 1798

Species of beetle

Ophonus puncticollis is a species of ground beetle in the subfamily Harpalinae, genus Ophonus, and subgenus Ophonus (Metophonus).
