= Ophonus vignai =

Scientific classification
- Domain: Eukaryota
- Kingdom: Animalia
- Phylum: Arthropoda
- Class: Insecta
- Order: Coleoptera
- Suborder: Adephaga
- Family: Carabidae
- Subfamily: Harpalinae
- Tribe: Harpalini
- Genus: Ophonus
- Species: O. vignai

Binomial name
- Ophonus vignai Sciaky, 1987

Species of beetle

Ophonus vignai is a species of ground beetle in the subfamily Harpalinae, genus Ophonus, and subgenus Ophonus (Brachyophonus).
