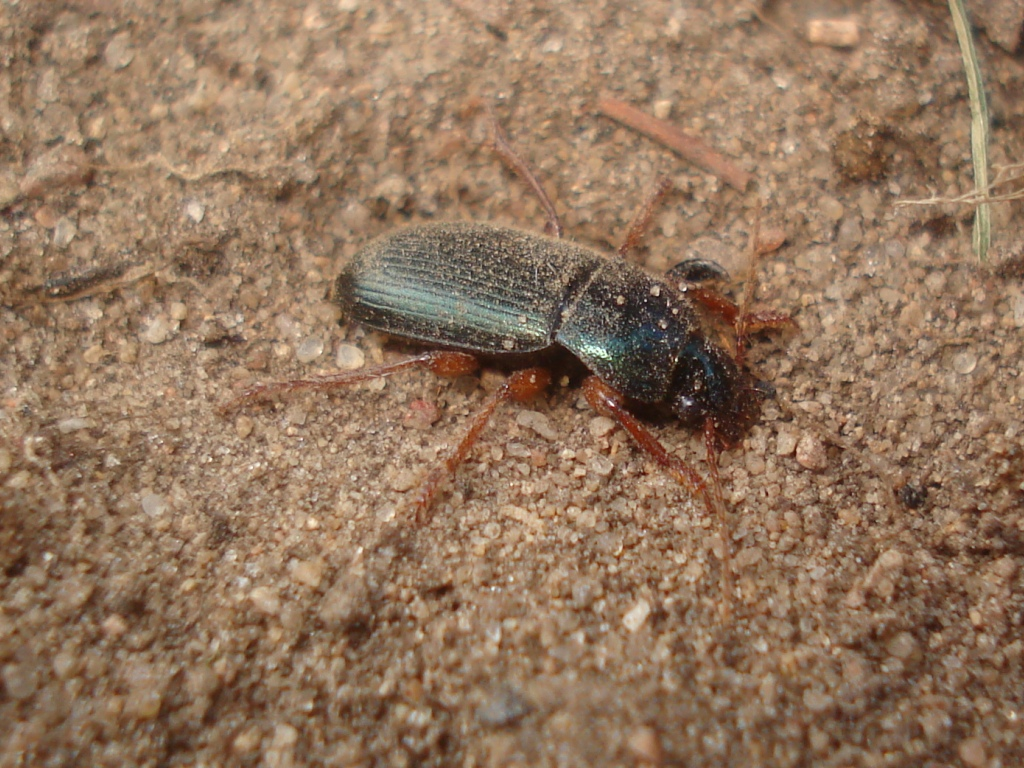
- Ophonus azureus

Scientific classification
- Domain: Eukaryota
- Kingdom: Animalia
- Phylum: Arthropoda
- Class: Insecta
- Order: Coleoptera
- Suborder: Adephaga
- Family: Carabidae
- Subfamily: Harpalinae
- Tribe: Harpalini
- Subtribe: Harpalina
- Genus: Ophonus; Dejean, 1821

= Ophonus =

Genus of beetles

Ophonus is a ground beetle genus native to the Palearctic (including Europe), the Near East, the Nearctic and North Africa. It contains the following species in the following subgenera:

- Subgenus Ophonus (Brachyophonus)
  - Ophonus krueperi Apfelbeck, 1904
  - Ophonus vignai Sciaky, 1987
- Subgenus Ophonus (Hesperophonus)
  - Ophonus azureus Fabricius, 1775
  - Ophonus bartoni Maran, 1935
  - Ophonus chlorizans Solsky, 1874
  - Ophonus convexicollis Menetries, 1832
  - Ophonus cribricollis Dejean, 1829
  - Ophonus jailensis Schauberger, 1926
  - Ophonus libanigena Brulerie, 1876
  - Ophonus longicollis Rambur, 1838
  - Ophonus longipilis Sciaky, 1987
  - Ophonus minimus Motschulsky, 1845
  - Ophonus pumilio Dejean, 1829
  - Ophonus rebellus Schauberger, 1926
  - Ophonus rotundatus Dejean, 1829
  - Ophonus similis Dejean, 1829
  - Ophonus subquadratus Dejean, 1829
  - Ophonus wolfi Wrase, 1995
- Subgenus Ophonus (Incisophonus)
  - Ophonus incisus Dejean, 1829
- Subgenus Ophonus (Macrophonus)
  - Ophonus houskai Jedlicka, 1955
  - Ophonus oblongus Schaum, 1858
  - Ophonus phoenix Tschitscherine, 1902
- Subgenus Ophonus (Metophonus)
  - Ophonus achilles Sciaky, 1987
  - Ophonus austrocaspicus Kataev & Belousov, 2001
  - Ophonus berberus Antoine, 1925
  - Ophonus castaneipennis Sciaky, 1987
  - Ophonus brevicollis Audinet-Serville, 1821
  - Ophonus cordatus Duftschmid, 1812
  - Ophonus cribratus Peyron, 1858
  - Ophonus cribrellus Reiche & Saulcy, 1855
  - Ophonus cunii Fairmaire, 1880
  - Ophonus davatchii Morvan, 1981
  - Ophonus elegantulus Sciaky, 1987
  - Ophonus ferrugatus Reitter, 1902
  - Ophonus gabrieleae Wrase, 1987
  - Ophonus gammeli Schauberger, 1932
  - Ophonus heinzianus Wrase, 1996
  - Ophonus hittita Sciaky, 1987
  - Ophonus hystrix Reitter, 1894
  - Ophonus israelita Brulerie, 1876
  - Ophonus jeanneli Sciaky, 1987
  - Ophonus judaeus Brulerie, 1876
  - Ophonus laticollis Mannerheim, 1825
  - Ophonus melletii Heer, 1837
  - Ophonus ophonoides Jedlicka, 1958
  - Ophonus parallelus Dejean, 1829
  - Ophonus puncticeps Stephens, 1828
  - Ophonus puncticollis Paykull, 1798
  - Ophonus rufibarbis Fabricius, 1792
  - Ophonus rupicola Sturm, 1818
  - Ophonus sahlbergianus Lutshnik, 1922
  - Ophonus scharifi Morvan, 1977
  - Ophonus schaubergerianus Puel, 1937
  - Ophonus sciakyi Wrase, 1990
  - Ophonus stricticollis Tschitscherine, 1893
  - Ophonus subsinuatus Rey, 1886
  - Ophonus syriacus Dejean, 1829
  - Ophonus transversus Motschulsky, 1844
  - Ophonus veluchianus G. Muller, 1931
  - Ophonus wrasei Sciaky, 1987
  - Ophonus xaxarsi Schauberger, 1928
- Subgenus Ophonus (Ophonus)
  - Ophonus ardosiacus Lutshnik, 1922
  - Ophonus battus Reitter, 1900
  - Ophonus diffinis Dejean, 1829
  - Ophonus franziniorum Sciaky, 1987
  - Ophonus heinzi Wrase, 1991
  - Ophonus opacus Dejean, 1829
  - Ophonus quadricollis Dejean, 1831
  - Ophonus sabulicola Panzer, 1796
  - Ophonus stictus Stephens, 1828
