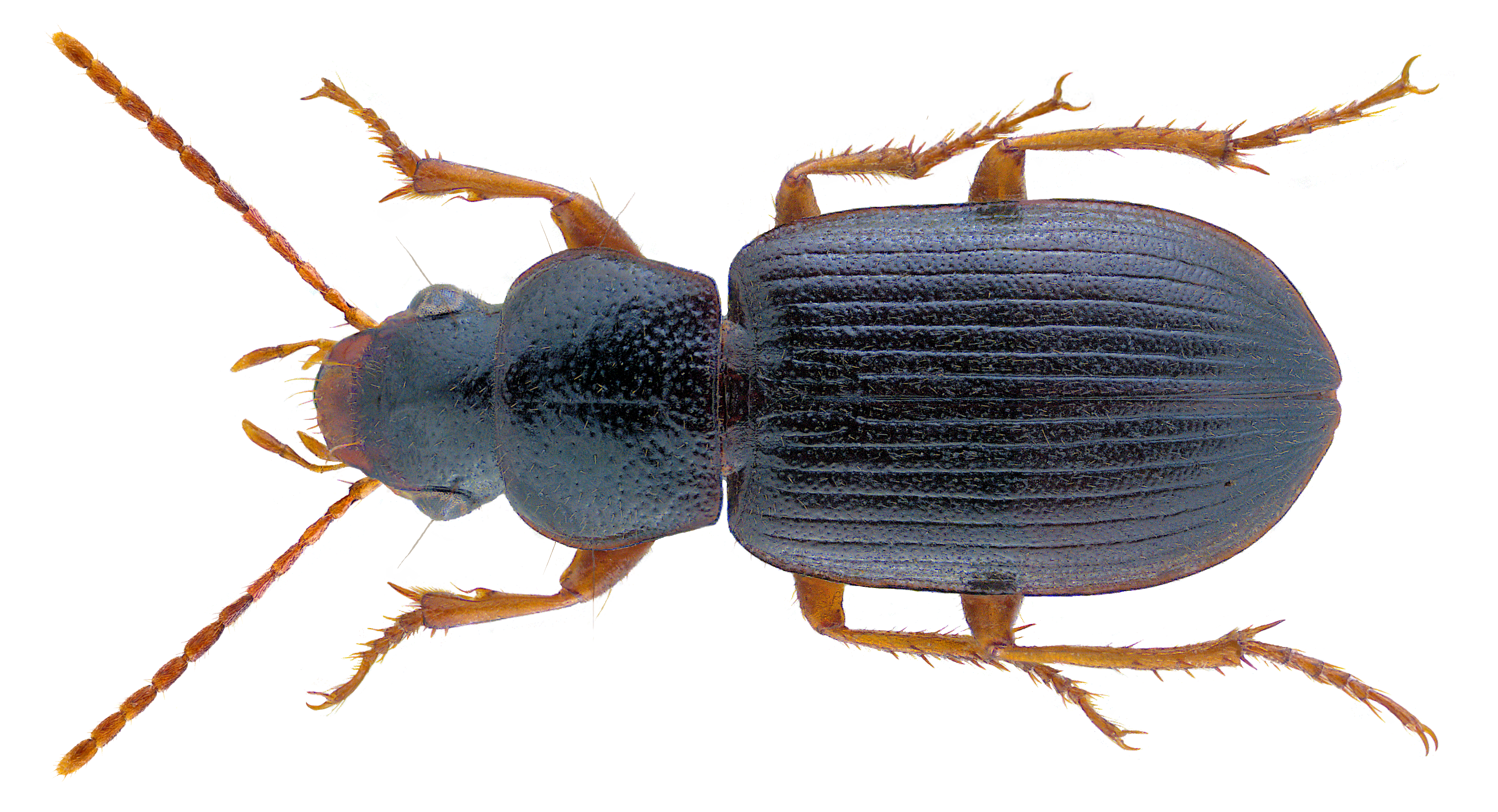

Scientific classification
- Kingdom: Animalia
- Phylum: Arthropoda
- Class: Insecta
- Order: Coleoptera
- Suborder: Adephaga
- Family: Carabidae
- Genus: Ophonus
- Species: O. subquadratus

Binomial name
- Ophonus subquadratus Dejean, 1829

= Ophonus subquadratus =

Species of beetle

Ophonus subquadratus is a species of ground beetle in the subfamily Harpalinae, genus Ophonus, and subgenus Ophonus (Hesperophonus).
