= Ophonus battus =

Scientific classification
- Kingdom: Animalia
- Phylum: Arthropoda
- Class: Insecta
- Order: Coleoptera
- Suborder: Adephaga
- Family: Carabidae
- Genus: Ophonus
- Species: O. battus

Binomial name
- Ophonus battus Reitter, 1900

Species of beetle

Ophonus battus is a species of ground beetle in the subfamily Harpalinae, genus Ophonus, and subgenus Ophonus (Ophonus).
