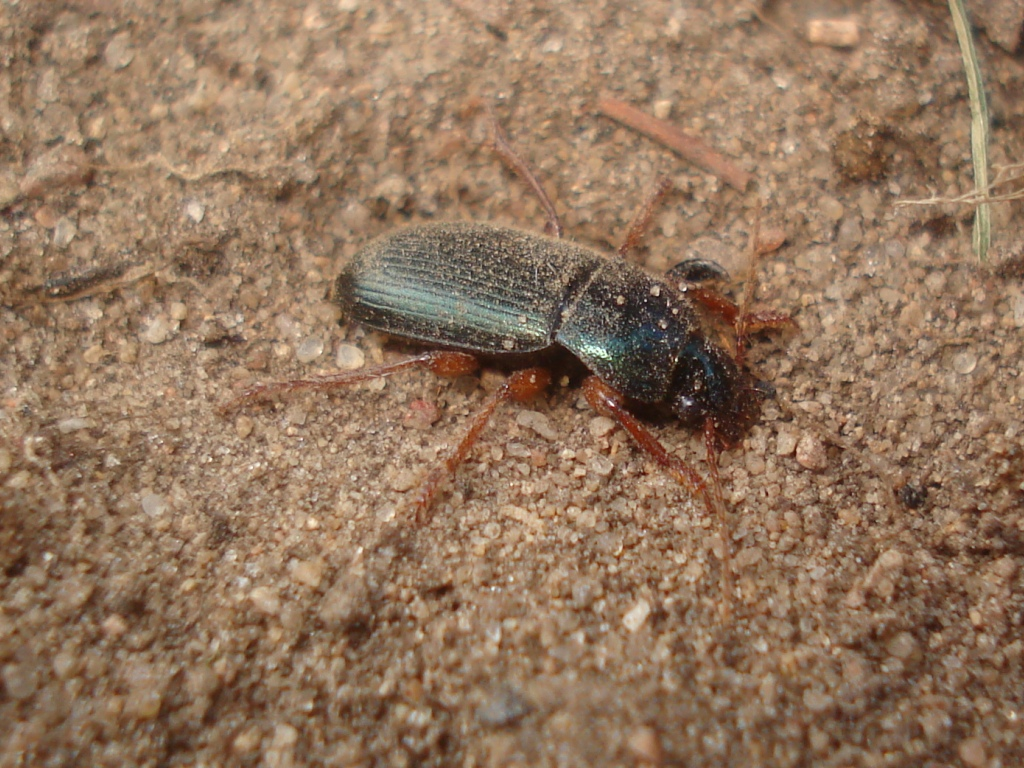

Scientific classification
- Domain: Eukaryota
- Kingdom: Animalia
- Phylum: Arthropoda
- Class: Insecta
- Order: Coleoptera
- Suborder: Adephaga
- Family: Carabidae
- Subfamily: Harpalinae
- Tribe: Harpalini
- Genus: Ophonus
- Species: O. azureus

Binomial name
- Ophonus azureus (Fabricius, 1775)

Synonyms
- Carabus azureus Fabricius, 1775

= Ophonus azureus =

Species of beetle

Ophonus azureus is a species of ground beetle in the subfamily Harpalinae, subgenus Ophonus (Hesperophonus). It is widespread in Europe and also present in North Africa and the Near East.
