= Ophonus oblongus =

Scientific classification
- Domain: Eukaryota
- Kingdom: Animalia
- Phylum: Arthropoda
- Class: Insecta
- Order: Coleoptera
- Suborder: Adephaga
- Family: Carabidae
- Subfamily: Harpalinae
- Tribe: Harpalini
- Genus: Ophonus
- Species: O. oblongus

Binomial name
- Ophonus oblongus (Schaum, 1858)

Synonyms
- Harpalus oblongus Schaum, 1858; Carabus langloisi Peyron, 1858

Species of beetle

Ophonus oblongus is a species of ground beetle native to the Palearctic realm, including parts of Europe and the Near East. In Europe, it can only be found in Bulgaria and Greece.
