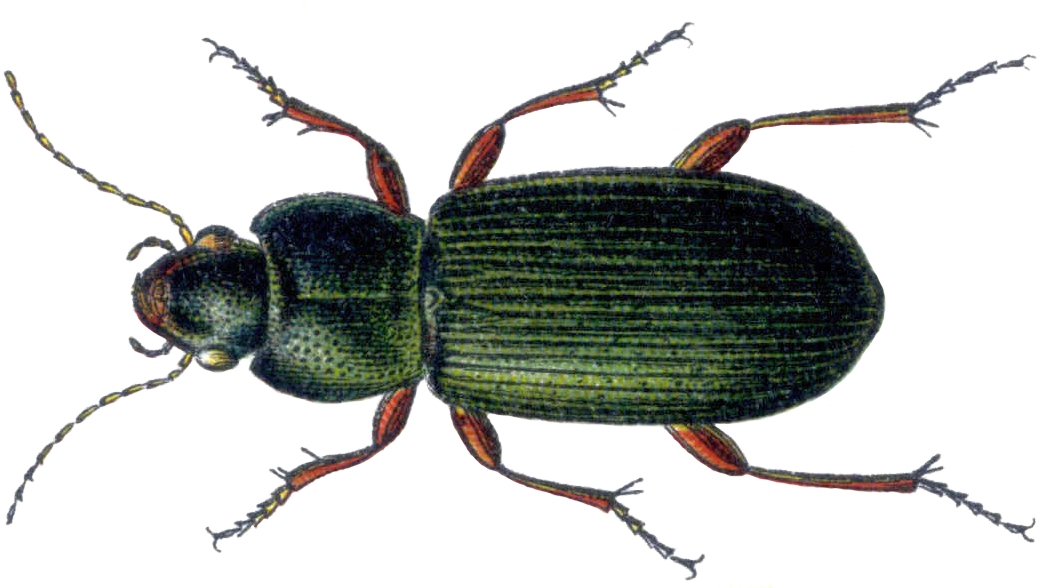

Scientific classification
- Kingdom: Animalia
- Phylum: Arthropoda
- Clade: Pancrustacea
- Class: Insecta
- Order: Coleoptera
- Suborder: Adephaga
- Family: Carabidae
- Genus: Ophonus
- Species: O. stictus

Binomial name
- Ophonus stictus Stephens, 1828

Synonyms
- Ophonus obscurus (Fabricius, 1792) nec Herbst 1784; Carabus obscurus Fabricius, 1792; Harpalus monticola Dejean, 1829

= Ophonus stictus =

Species of beetle

Ophonus stictus is a species of ground beetle native to the Palearctic (including Europe), and the Near East. In Europe, it is only absent in the following countries and islands: Albania, Andorra, the Baltic states, the Canary Islands, the Channel Islands, Corsica, Crete, the Cyclades, Cyprus, the Dodecanese, the Faroe Islands, Franz Josef Land, Gibraltar, Iceland, Ireland, Madeira, Malta, Monaco, the North Aegean islands, Novaya Zemlya, Russia (except for southern and northern part), San Marino, Sardinia, the Savage Islands, Scandinavia, Sicily, Svalbard and Jan Mayen, Vatican City, and in all states of former Yugoslavia except for Croatia, Slovenia, Bosnia and Herzegovina. Its presence in Latvia is doubtful.

== Distribution ==
In Belgium, the species can be found in Brussels, Flanders and Wallonia.

== Description ==
The species is 12–16 millimetres (0.47–0.63 in) in length and is either black or dark brown in colour with a greenish wings on long elytron which also have dark brown pubescence. Its legs are light brown. The species also have an elongate aedeagal apex which is at least four times as long and wide as its prothorax. As far as prothorax goes, it is wide to the front with contracted sides and blunt hind angles.

== Habitat ==
The species prefers quarries and limestone or chalk soils.

== Protection ==
On September 22 of 1980 the species was put under protection in Belgium.
