= Ophonus ferrugatus =

Scientific classification
- Kingdom: Animalia
- Phylum: Arthropoda
- Class: Insecta
- Order: Coleoptera
- Suborder: Adephaga
- Family: Carabidae
- Genus: Ophonus
- Species: O. ferrugatus

Binomial name
- Ophonus ferrugatus Reitter, 1902

Species of beetle

Ophonus ferrugatus is a species of ground beetle in the subfamily Harpalinae, genus Ophonus, and subgenus Ophonus (Metophonus).
