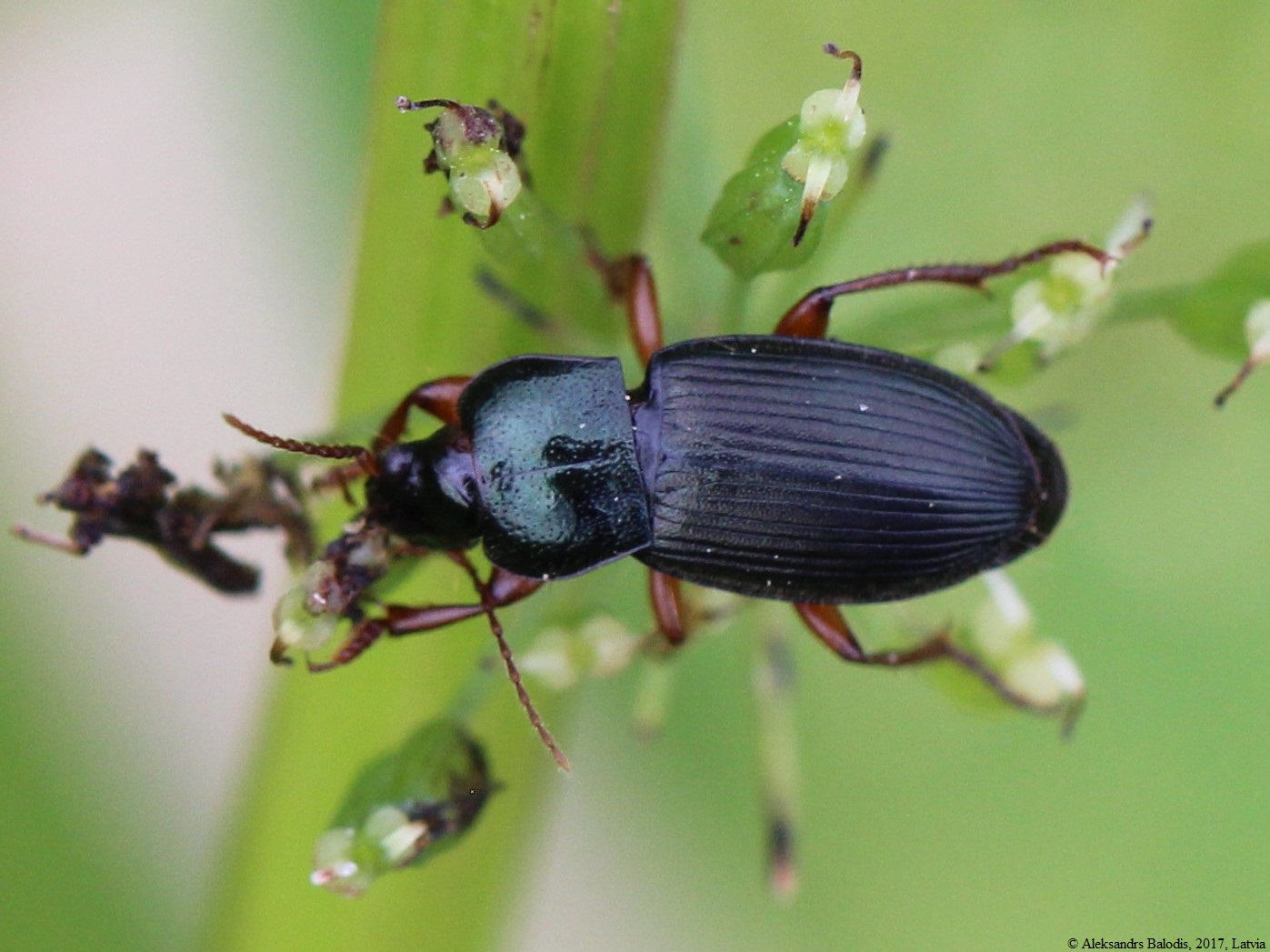
- A beetle on a leaf

Scientific classification
- Domain: Eukaryota
- Kingdom: Animalia
- Phylum: Arthropoda
- Class: Insecta
- Order: Coleoptera
- Suborder: Adephaga
- Family: Carabidae
- Subfamily: Harpalinae
- Tribe: Harpalini
- Genus: Ophonus
- Species: O. laticollis

Binomial name
- Ophonus laticollis Mannerheim, 1825

= Ophonus laticollis =

Species of beetle

Ophonus laticollis is a species of ground beetle in the subfamily Harpalinae, subgenus Ophonus (Metophonus). It is widespread in Europe.
