= Ophonus krueperi =

Scientific classification
- Kingdom: Animalia
- Phylum: Arthropoda
- Class: Insecta
- Order: Coleoptera
- Suborder: Adephaga
- Family: Carabidae
- Subfamily: Harpalinae
- Tribe: Harpalini
- Genus: Ophonus
- Species: O. krueperi

Binomial name
- Ophonus krueperi Apfelbeck, 1904

Species of beetle

Ophonus krueperi is a species of ground beetle in the subfamily Harpalinae, genus Ophonus, and subgenus Ophonus (Brachyophonus).
