= Ophonus cunii =

Scientific classification
- Kingdom: Animalia
- Phylum: Arthropoda
- Class: Insecta
- Order: Coleoptera
- Suborder: Adephaga
- Family: Carabidae
- Tribe: Harpalini
- Genus: Ophonus
- Species: O. cunii

Binomial name
- Ophonus cunii Fairmaire, 1880

Species of beetle

Ophonus cunii is a species of ground beetle in the subfamily Harpalinae, genus Ophonus, and subgenus Ophonus (Metophonus).
