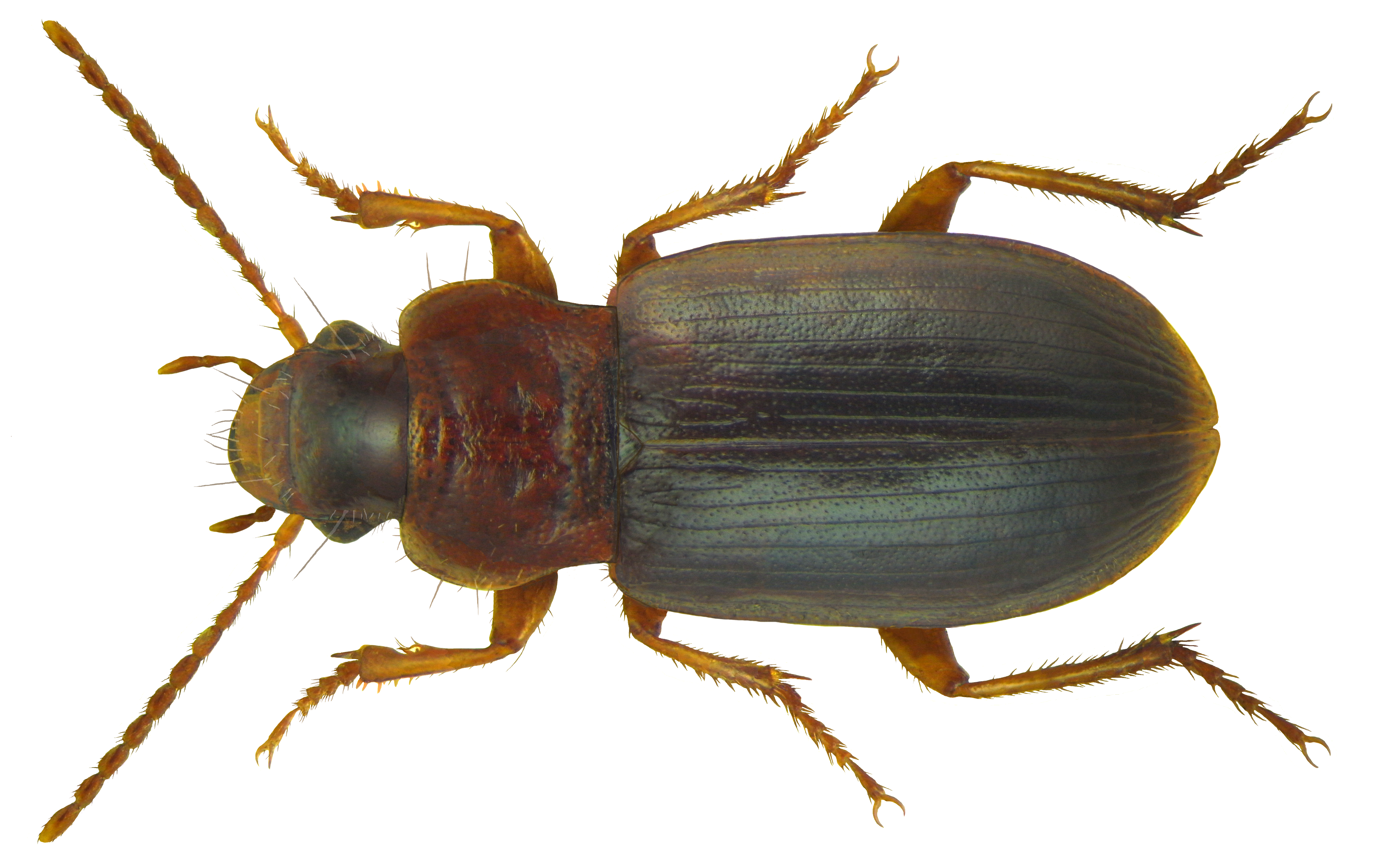

Scientific classification
- Kingdom: Animalia
- Phylum: Arthropoda
- Class: Insecta
- Order: Coleoptera
- Suborder: Adephaga
- Family: Carabidae
- Tribe: Harpalini
- Genus: Ophonus
- Species: O. rufibarbis

Binomial name
- Ophonus rufibarbis (Fabricius, 1792)

Synonyms
- Carabus rufibarbis Fabricius, 1792; Harpalus seladon Schauberger, 1926; Harpalus subpunctatus Stephens, 1828

= Ophonus rufibarbis =

Species of beetle

Ophonus rufibarbis is a species of ground beetle that can be found everywhere in Europe and the Near East.

== Description ==
The species is black coloured with brownish legs and antennae. It is phytophagous and is 6.2–9.5 millimetres (0.24–0.37 in) long. Sometimes though, it is 6.0–9.1 millimetres (0.24–0.36 in) in length.

== Distribution ==
In Belgium, the species can be found in Brussels, Flanders, and Wallonia. The species was introduced to North America from Europe.

== Habitat ==
It can be found in arable fields, draining soils, hedgerows, lakeshores and woodlands.

== Threat level ==
As of September 22, 1980 the species is under protection in Flanders.
