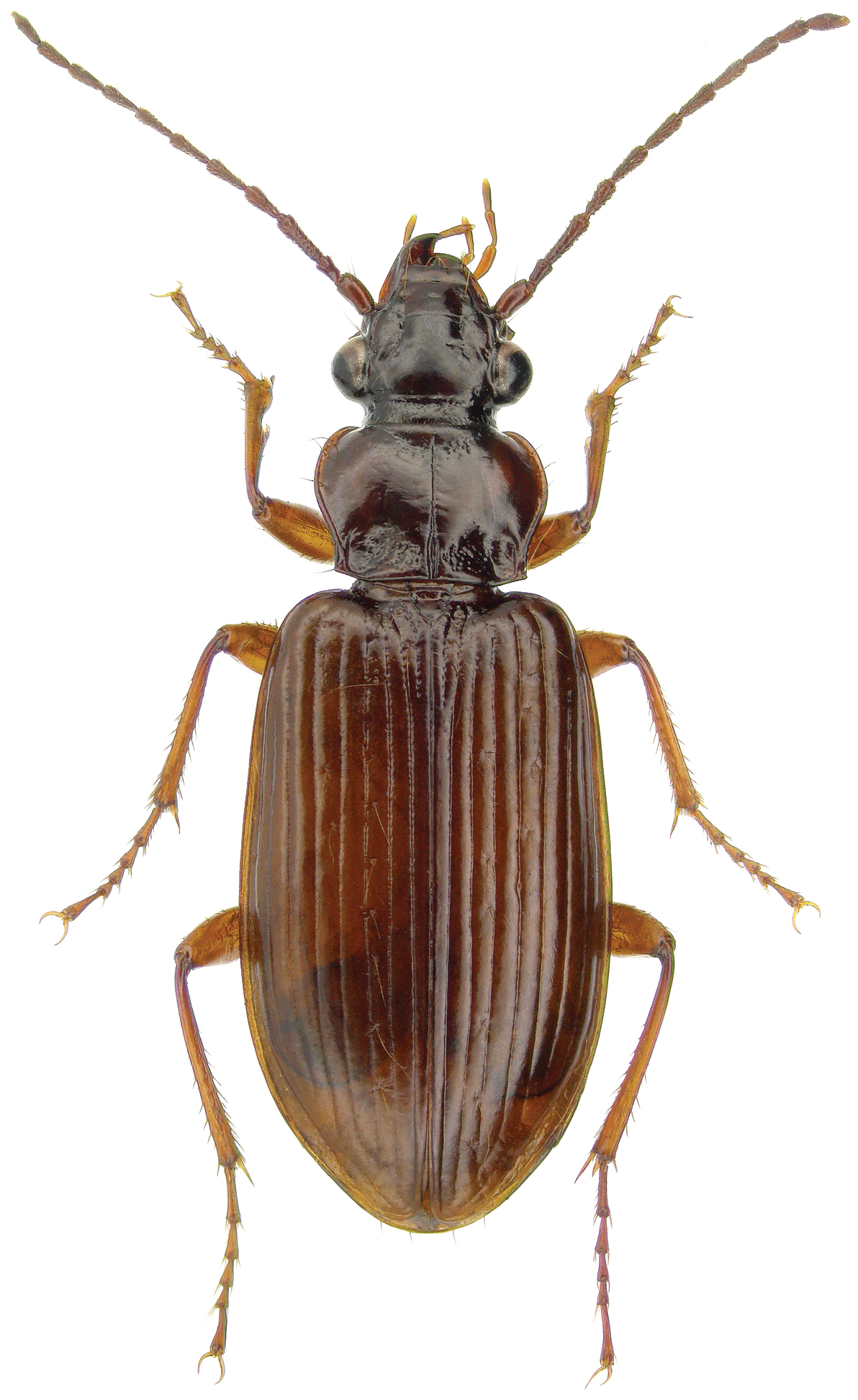
- Platypatrobus lacustris

Scientific classification
- Domain: Eukaryota
- Kingdom: Animalia
- Phylum: Arthropoda
- Class: Insecta
- Order: Coleoptera
- Suborder: Adephaga
- Family: Carabidae
- Subfamily: Patrobinae; Kirby, 1837

= Patrobinae =

Subfamily of beetles

Patrobinae is a subfamily of ground beetles in the family Carabidae. There are more than 20 genera and 240 described species in Patrobinae.

There are two tribes in this subfamily, Lissopogonini and Patrobini. Lissopogonini contains only one genus, Lissopogonus, while the other genera of this subfamily are members of Patrobini.

== Genera ==
These 29 genera belong to the subfamily Patrobinae:

Tribe Lissopogonini Zamotajlov, 2000
Lissopogonus Andrewes, 1923
Tribe Patrobini Kirby, 1837
Deltomerus Motschulsky, 1850
Deltomerodes Deuve, 1992
Apatrobus Habu & Baba, 1960
Apenetretus Kurnakov, 1960
Archipatrobus Zamotajlov, 1992
Caelopenetretus Zamotajlov & Ito, 2000
Chaetapatrobus Lafer, 1996
Chinapenetretus Kurnakov, 1963
Dimorphopatrobus Casale & Sciaky, 1994
Diplous Motschulsky, 1850
Grandipenetretus Zamotajlov & Sciaky, 1999
Himalopenetretus Zamotajlov, 2002
Indopatrobus Zamotajlov & Wrase, 2006
Ledouxius Zamotajlov, 1992
Minipenetretus Zamotajlov, 2002
Minypatrobus Ueno, 1955
Naxipenetretus Zamotajlov, 1999
Parapatrobus Zamotajlov, 1992
Parapenetretus Kurnakov, 1960
Patanitretus Zamotajlov, 2002
Patrobus Dejean, 1821
Penetretus Motschulsky, 1865
Platidiolus Chaudoir, 1878
Platypatrobus Darlington, 1938
Prodiplous Zamotajlov & Sciaky, 2006
Qiangopatrobus Zamotajlov, 2002
Quasipenetretus Zamotajlov, 2002
Tibetopenetretus Zamotajlov & Sciaky, 1999
