= Deltomerodes =

Scientific classification
- Domain: Eukaryota
- Kingdom: Animalia
- Phylum: Arthropoda
- Class: Insecta
- Order: Coleoptera
- Suborder: Adephaga
- Family: Carabidae
- Subfamily: Patrobinae
- Tribe: Patrobini
- Subtribe: Deltomerodina
- Genus: Deltomerodes; Deuve, 1992

Genus of beetles

Deltomerodes is a genus of ground beetles in the family Carabidae. There are about 15 described species in Deltomerodes.

== Species ==
These 15 species belong to the genus Deltomerodes:

- Deltomerodes chulii J.Schmidt, 1995 (Nepal)
- Deltomerodes conaensis Yan; H.Shi; Liang & J.Shi, 2021 (China)
- Deltomerodes grilli J.Schmidt & Hartmann, 1998 (Nepal)
- Deltomerodes kryzhanovskii Zamotajlov, 1999 (China)
- Deltomerodes memorabilis Deuve, 1992 (China)
- Deltomerodes miroshnikovi Zamotajlov, 1999 (China)
- Deltomerodes murzini Zamotajlov, 1999 (China)
- Deltomerodes nepalensis J.Schmidt, 1994 (Nepal)
- Deltomerodes ovicollis Yan; H.Shi; Liang & J.Shi, 2021 (China)
- Deltomerodes schawalleri J.Schmidt, 1998 (Nepal)
- Deltomerodes schmidti Zamotajlov, 1999 (Nepal)
- Deltomerodes sciakyi J.Schmidt, 1996 (Nepal)
- Deltomerodes stenomus (Andrewes, 1936) (India)
- Deltomerodes wrasei Zamotajlov, 1999 (China)
- Deltomerodes zolotichini Zamotajlov, 1999 (China)
