= Penetretus =

Scientific classification
- Kingdom: Animalia
- Phylum: Arthropoda
- Class: Insecta
- Order: Coleoptera
- Suborder: Adephaga
- Family: Carabidae
- Subfamily: Patrobinae
- Tribe: Patrobini
- Subtribe: Patrobina
- Genus: Penetretus; Motschulsky, 1865

Genus of beetles

Penetretus is a genus of ground beetles in the family Carabidae. There are about five described species in Penetretus.

== Species ==
These five species belong to the genus Penetretus:

- Penetretus andalusicus (Reitter, 1897) (Spain)
- Penetretus imitator Zamotajlov, 1990 (Spain)
- Penetretus nebrioides (Vuillefroy, 1866) (Spain)
- Penetretus rufipennis (Dejean, 1828) (France, Portugal, and Spain)
- Penetretus temporalis Bedel, 1909 (Morocco and Spain)
