= Chinapenetretus =

Scientific classification
- Domain: Eukaryota
- Kingdom: Animalia
- Phylum: Arthropoda
- Class: Insecta
- Order: Coleoptera
- Suborder: Adephaga
- Family: Carabidae
- Subfamily: Patrobinae
- Tribe: Patrobini
- Subtribe: Patrobina
- Genus: Chinapenetretus; Kurnakov, 1963

Subgenera
- Baiopenetretus Zamotajlov, 2002; Chinapenetretus Kurnakov, 1963

Genus of beetles

Chinapenetretus is a genus of ground beetles in the family Carabidae. There are about nine described species in Chinapenetretus, found in China.

== Species ==
These nine species belong to the genus Chinapenetretus:

- Chinapenetretus cangensis Zamotajlov, 2002
- Chinapenetretus impexus Zamotajlov & Sciaky, 1999
- Chinapenetretus impressus Zamotajlov & Sciaky, 1999
- Chinapenetretus kryzhanovskii Zamotajlov & Sciaky, 1999
- Chinapenetretus potanini (Kurnakov, 1963)
- Chinapenetretus reticulatus (Zamotajlov, 1990)
- Chinapenetretus salebrosus Zamotajlov & Sciaky, 1999
- Chinapenetretus wittmeri Zamotajlov & Sciaky, 1999
- Chinapenetretus yunnanus (Fairmaire, 1886)
