= Platidiolus =

Scientific classification
- Domain: Eukaryota
- Kingdom: Animalia
- Phylum: Arthropoda
- Class: Insecta
- Order: Coleoptera
- Suborder: Adephaga
- Family: Carabidae
- Subfamily: Patrobinae
- Tribe: Patrobini
- Genus: Platidiolus; Chaudoir, 1878

Genus of beetles

Platidiolus is a genus of ground beetles in the family Carabidae. There are about five described species in Platidiolus.

== Species ==
These five species belong to the genus Platidiolus:

- Platidiolus borealis Zamotajlov & Lafer, 2001 (Russia)
- Platidiolus brinevi Zamotajlov & Lafer, 2001 (Russia)
- Platidiolus nazarenkoi Lafer & Zamotajlov, 2001 (Russia)
- Platidiolus rufus Chaudoir, 1878 (Russia)
- Platidiolus vandykei Kurnakov, 1960 (North America)
