= Apatrobus =

Scientific classification
- Kingdom: Animalia
- Phylum: Arthropoda
- Class: Insecta
- Order: Coleoptera
- Suborder: Adephaga
- Family: Carabidae
- Subfamily: Patrobinae
- Tribe: Patrobini
- Subtribe: Patrobina
- Genus: Apatrobus; Habu & Baba, 1960

Genus of beetles

Apatrobus is a genus of ground beetles in the family Carabidae. There are more than 20 described species in Apatrobus, found mainly in Japan.

== Species ==
These 21 species belong to the genus Apatrobus:

- Apatrobus cornifer Kasahara & Y.Ito, 1994
- Apatrobus echigonus (Habu & Baba, 1962)
- Apatrobus hasemiya Morita, 1990
- Apatrobus hayachinensis (Nakane, 1968)
- Apatrobus hekosanus Sasakawa, 2020
- Apatrobus hikosanus (Habu, 1953)
- Apatrobus ishiharai Kasahara & Y.Ito, 1994
- Apatrobus ishizuchiensis (Habu, 1976)
- Apatrobus iturupensis Lafer, 2001 (Russia)
- Apatrobus iwasakii Morita, 1987
- Apatrobus jakuchiensis (Habu, 1977)
- Apatrobus kurosawai Morita, 1986
- Apatrobus narukawai Morita, 1989
- Apatrobus nishiawakurae (Habu, 1980)
- Apatrobus odanakai Kasahara, 1995
- Apatrobus ohdaisanus (Nakane, 1963)
- Apatrobus ohtsukai Morita, 1993
- Apatrobus osuzuyamanus Sasakawa & Toki, 2007
- Apatrobus satoui (Habu, 1976)
- Apatrobus tsurugiensis (Habu, 1976)
- Apatrobus yamajii Kasahara, 1995
