= Naxipenetretus =

Scientific classification
- Domain: Eukaryota
- Kingdom: Animalia
- Phylum: Arthropoda
- Class: Insecta
- Order: Coleoptera
- Suborder: Adephaga
- Family: Carabidae
- Subfamily: Patrobinae
- Tribe: Patrobini
- Subtribe: Patrobina
- Genus: Naxipenetretus; Zamotajlov, 1999

Genus of beetles

Naxipenetretus is a genus in the ground beetle family Carabidae. There are at least two described species in Naxipenetretus, found in China.

== Species ==
These two species belong to the genus Naxipenetretus:

- Naxipenetretus sciakyi Zamotajlov, 1999
- Naxipenetretus trisetosus (Zamotajlov & Sciaky, 1996)
