= Parapenetretus =

Scientific classification
- Domain: Eukaryota
- Kingdom: Animalia
- Phylum: Arthropoda
- Class: Insecta
- Order: Coleoptera
- Suborder: Adephaga
- Family: Carabidae
- Subfamily: Patrobinae
- Tribe: Patrobini
- Subtribe: Patrobina
- Genus: Parapenetretus; Kurnakov, 1960

Subgenera
- Ambigopenetretus Zamotajlov, 2002; Butanopenetretus Zamotajlov, 1992; Parapenetretus Kurnakov, 1960; Propenetretus Zamotajlov & Wrase, 2006; Robustopenetretus Zamotajlov & Sciaky, 1999

Genus of beetles

Parapenetretus is a genus of ground beetles in the family Carabidae. There are at least 20 described species in Parapenetretus, found mainly in China.

== Species ==
These 20 species belong to the genus Parapenetretus:

- Parapenetretus barkamensis Zamotajlov & N.Ito, 2000
- Parapenetretus caudicornis (Kurnakov, 1963)
- Parapenetretus daliangensis (Zamotajlov; Sciaky & Ito, 2000)
- Parapenetretus farkaci (Zamotajlov; Sciaky & Ito, 2000)
- Parapenetretus kabaki Zamotajlov, 2002
- Parapenetretus kasantsevi (Zamotajlov & Sciaky, 1999)
- Parapenetretus medvedevi Zamotajlov & Sciaky, 2006
- Parapenetretus microphthalmus (Fairmaire, 1889)
- Parapenetretus microps Zamotajlov & Sciaky, 1996
- Parapenetretus nanpingensis Zamotajlov & Sciaky, 1996
- Parapenetretus pavesii Zamotajlov & Sciaky, 1996
- Parapenetretus pilosohumeralis Zamotajlov, 1993
- Parapenetretus saueri Zamotajlov & Sciaky, 1996
- Parapenetretus selaensis Zamotajlov & Wrase, 2006 (India)
- Parapenetretus shimianensis Zamotajlov, 2002
- Parapenetretus subtilis Zamotajlov & Heinz, 1998
- Parapenetretus szetschuanus (Jedlicka, 1959)
- Parapenetretus wenxianensis Zamotajlov & Sciaky, 2006
- Parapenetretus wittmeri Zamotajlov, 1992 (Bhutan)
- Parapenetretus xilinensis (Zamotajlov & Wrase, 1997)
