= Archipatrobus =

Scientific classification
- Domain: Eukaryota
- Kingdom: Animalia
- Phylum: Arthropoda
- Class: Insecta
- Order: Coleoptera
- Suborder: Adephaga
- Family: Carabidae
- Subfamily: Patrobinae
- Tribe: Patrobini
- Subtribe: Patrobina
- Genus: Archipatrobus; Zamotajlov, 1992

Genus of beetles

Archipatrobus is a genus of ground beetles in the family Carabidae. There are at least three described species in Archipatrobus.

== Species ==
These three species belong to the genus Archipatrobus:

- Archipatrobus deuvei Zamotajlov, 1992 (China)
- Archipatrobus flavipes (Motschulsky, 1864) (Eastern Asia)
- Archipatrobus suensoni (Zamotajlov & Kryzhanovskij, 1990) (China)
