= Ledouxius =

Scientific classification
- Domain: Eukaryota
- Kingdom: Animalia
- Phylum: Arthropoda
- Class: Insecta
- Order: Coleoptera
- Suborder: Adephaga
- Family: Carabidae
- Subfamily: Patrobinae
- Tribe: Patrobini
- Subtribe: Patrobina
- Genus: Ledouxius; Zamotajlov, 1992

Subgenera
- Hasarotretus Zamotajlov & Sciaky, 2006; Ledouxius Zamotajlov, 1992

Genus of beetles

Ledouxius is a genus of ground beetles in the family Carabidae. There are about six described species in Ledouxius.

== Species ==
These six species belong to the genus Ledouxius:

- Ledouxius kaganensis (Heinz & Ledoux, 1987) (Pakistan)
- Ledouxius longulus (Ledoux, 1984) (India)
- Ledouxius meurguesae (Ledoux, 1984) (India)
- Ledouxius microcephalus (Ledoux, 1984) (India)
- Ledouxius oblongus (Ledoux, 1984) (India)
- Ledouxius umbilicatus (Ledoux, 1984) (India)
