= Patrobus septentrionis =

Scientific classification
- Kingdom: Animalia
- Phylum: Arthropoda
- Class: Insecta
- Order: Coleoptera
- Suborder: Adephaga
- Family: Carabidae
- Genus: Patrobus
- Species: P. septentrionis

Binomial name
- Patrobus septentrionis Dejean, 1828

Species of beetle

Patrobus septentrionis is a species of ground beetle in the family Carabidae. It is found in Europe and Northern Asia (excluding China) and North America.
