= Qiangopatrobus =

Scientific classification
- Domain: Eukaryota
- Kingdom: Animalia
- Phylum: Arthropoda
- Class: Insecta
- Order: Coleoptera
- Suborder: Adephaga
- Family: Carabidae
- Subfamily: Patrobinae
- Tribe: Patrobini
- Subtribe: Patrobina
- Genus: Qiangopatrobus; Zamotajlov, 2002

Genus of beetles

Qiangopatrobus is a genus of ground beetles in the family Carabidae. There are at least three described species in Qiangopatrobus, found in China.

== Species ==
These three species belong to the genus Qiangopatrobus:

- Qiangopatrobus andrewesi (Zamotajlov, 1990) (China)
- Qiangopatrobus dentatus (Zamotajlov & Sawada, 1996) (China)
- Qiangopatrobus koiwayai (Zamotajlov & Sawada, 1996) (China)
