= Diplous aterrimus =

Scientific classification
- Kingdom: Animalia
- Phylum: Arthropoda
- Class: Insecta
- Order: Coleoptera
- Suborder: Adephaga
- Family: Carabidae
- Genus: Diplous
- Species: D. aterrimus

Binomial name
- Diplous aterrimus (Dejean, 1828)

Species of beetle

Diplous aterrimus is a species of ground beetle in the family Carabidae. It is found in North America.
