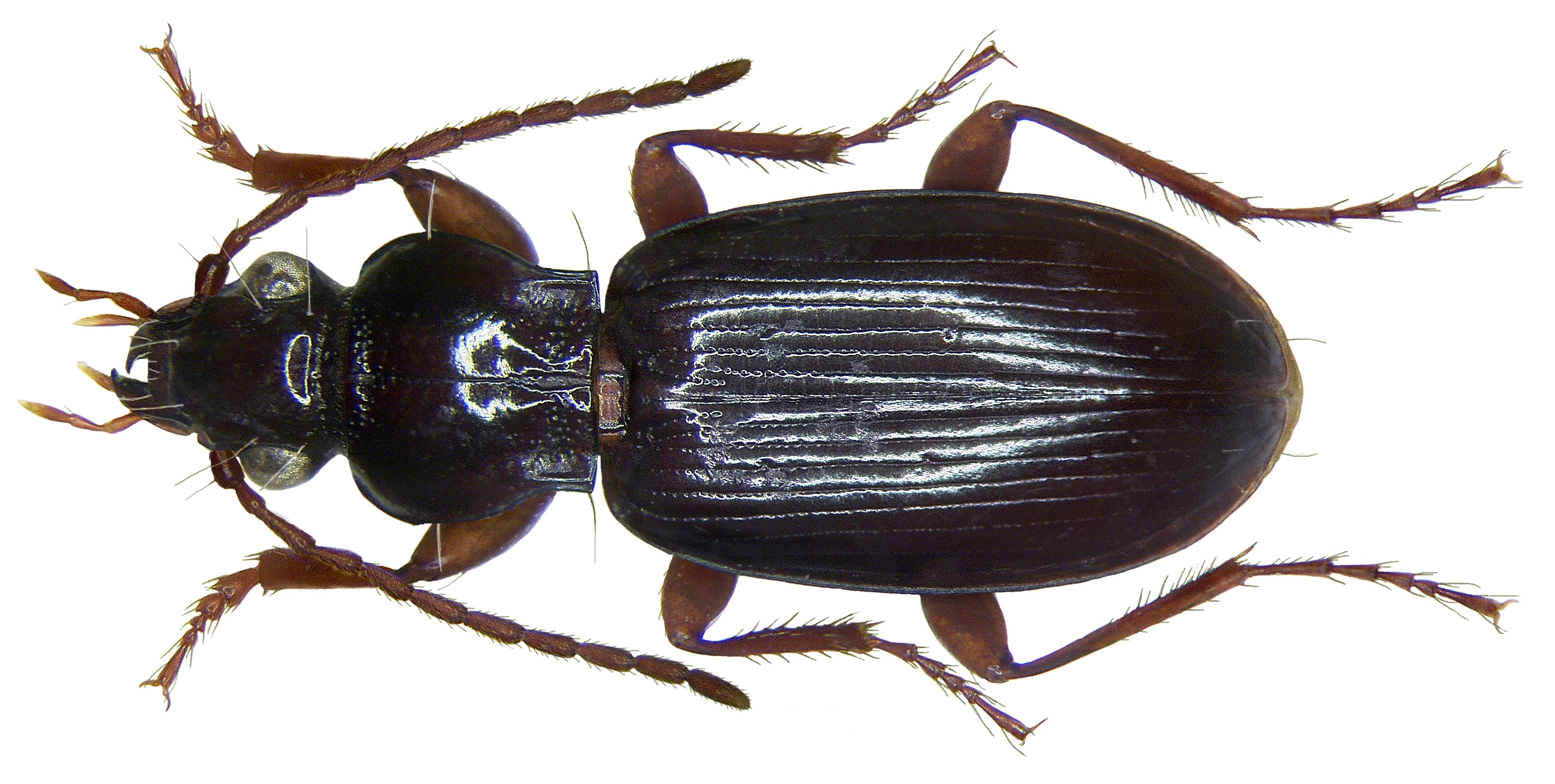

Scientific classification
- Domain: Eukaryota
- Kingdom: Animalia
- Phylum: Arthropoda
- Class: Insecta
- Order: Coleoptera
- Suborder: Adephaga
- Family: Carabidae
- Genus: Patrobus
- Species: P. atrorufus

Binomial name
- Patrobus atrorufus (Stroem, 1768)

= Patrobus atrorufus =

Species of beetle

Patrobus atrorufus is a species of ground beetle native to Europe.
