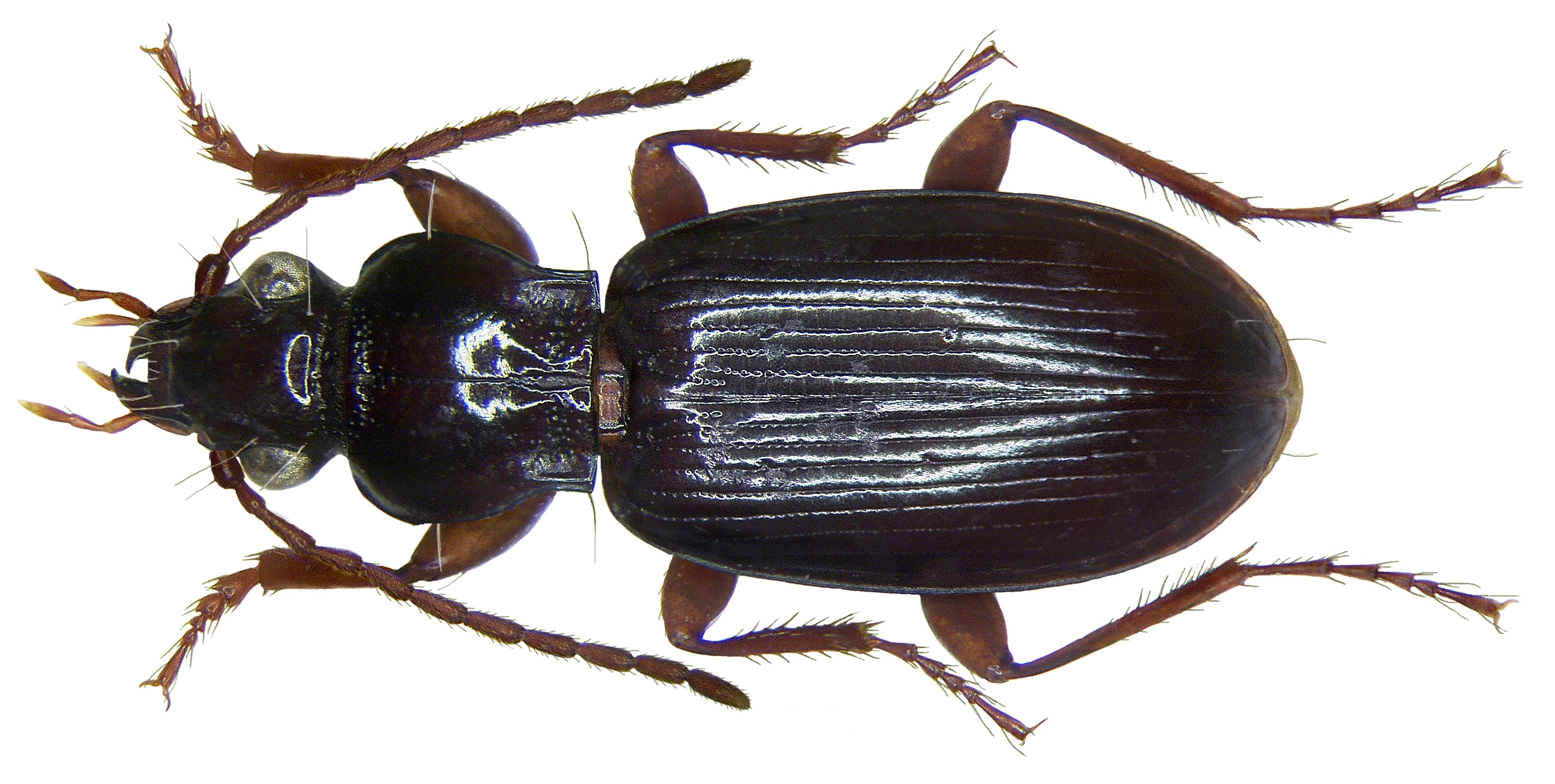
- Patrobus atrorufus

Scientific classification
- Kingdom: Animalia
- Phylum: Arthropoda
- Class: Insecta
- Order: Coleoptera
- Suborder: Adephaga
- Family: Carabidae
- Subfamily: Patrobinae
- Tribe: Patrobini
- Genus: Patrobus; Dejean, 1821

= Patrobus =

Genus of beetles

Patrobus is a genus of ground beetles in the family Carabidae. There are more than 20 described species in Patrobus.

== Species ==
These 21 species belong to the genus Patrobus:

- Patrobus assimilis Chaudoir, 1844 (Palearctic)
- Patrobus atrorufus (Ström, 1768) (Palearctic)
- Patrobus australis J.Sahlberg, 1875 (Palearctic)
- Patrobus cinctus Motschulsky, 1860 (Holarctic)
- Patrobus fossifrons (Eschscholtz, 1823) (Holarctic)
- Patrobus foveocollis (Eschscholtz, 1823) (Holarctic)
- Patrobus lecontei Chaudoir, 1872 (North America)
- Patrobus longicornis (Say, 1823) (North America)
- Patrobus obliteratus Gebler, 1848 (Russia)
- Patrobus platophthalmus Iablokoff-Khnzorian, 1970 (Russia)
- Patrobus quadricollis L.Miller, 1868 (Poland, Romania, and Ukraine)
- Patrobus roubali Maran, 1933 (Romania)
- Patrobus septentrionis Dejean, 1828 (Holarctic)
- Patrobus stygicus Chaudoir, 1872 (Holarctic)
- Patrobus styriacus Chaudoir, 1872 (Europe)
- Patrobus teresae J. & E.Vives, 2005 (Spain)
- † Patrobus decessus Scudder, 1900
- † Patrobus frigidus Scudder, 1900
- † Patrobus gasirowskii Lomnicki, 1894
- † Patrobus gelatus Scudder, 1890
- † Patrobus henshawi Wickham, 1917
