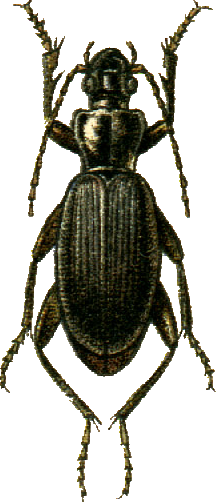

Scientific classification
- Kingdom: Animalia
- Phylum: Arthropoda
- Class: Insecta
- Order: Coleoptera
- Suborder: Adephaga
- Family: Carabidae
- Subfamily: Patrobinae
- Tribe: Patrobini
- Subtribe: Deltomerina
- Genus: Deltomerus; Motschulsky, 1850

Subgenera
- Berberomerus Zamotajlov, 2002; Deltomerus Motschulsky, 1850; Paradeltomerus Apfelbeck, 1908

= Deltomerus =

Genus of beetles

Deltomerus is a genus of ground beetles in the family Carabidae. There are more than 70 described species in Deltomerus.

== Species ==
These 73 species belong to the genus Deltomerus:

- Deltomerus abdurakhmanovi Zamotajlov, 1994 (Russia)
- Deltomerus alexeevi Zamotajlov, 1992 (Russia)
- Deltomerus balachovskyi Ledoux, 1976 (Turkey)
- Deltomerus belousovi Zamotajlov, 1988 (Georgia and Russia)
- Deltomerus bogatshevi Zamotajlov, 1988 (Azerbaijan and Russia)
- Deltomerus bogossicus Zamotajlov, 1992 (Russia)
- Deltomerus boroumandi Deuve, 2011 (Iran)
- Deltomerus bosnicus Apfelbeck, 1912 (Bosnia-Herzegovina)
- Deltomerus carpathicus (L.Miller, 1868) (Poland, Romania, Slovakia, and Ukraine)
- Deltomerus chachalgensis Zamotajlov, 1994 (Russia)
- Deltomerus circassicus Reitter, 1890 (Georgia and Russia)
- Deltomerus corax Peyerimhoff, 1922
- Deltomerus dariae Zamotajlov, 1994 (Russia)
- Deltomerus davatchii Morvan, 1970 (Iran)
- Deltomerus defanus Zamotajlov, 1988 (Russia)
- Deltomerus deliae Morvan, 1970 (Iran)
- Deltomerus depressus A.Fiori, 1896 (Italy)
- Deltomerus dinci Ledoux, 1976 (Turkey)
- Deltomerus dostali Donabauer, 2004 (Syria)
- Deltomerus dubiolus Zamotajlov, 1992 (Georgia)
- Deltomerus dubius (Chaudoir, 1846) (Georgia)
- Deltomerus elburzensis Morvan, 1981 (Iran)
- Deltomerus elegans Chaudoir, 1872 (Georgia)
- Deltomerus elongatus (Dejean, 1831) (Georgia and Russia)
- Deltomerus ensiger Kurnakov, 1960 (Georgia and Russia)
- Deltomerus expectatus Zamotajlov, 1992 (Georgia)
- Deltomerus fischtensis Kurnakov, 1960 (Russia)
- Deltomerus fulvipes (Motschulsky, 1839) (Georgia)
- Deltomerus golovatchi Zamotajlov, 1992 (Russia)
- Deltomerus gusevi Belousov & Zamotajlov, 1988 (Azerbaijan)
- Deltomerus heinzi Zamotajlov, 2001 (Iran)
- Deltomerus intermedius Zamotajlov, 1992 (Russia)
- Deltomerus iristonicus Zamotajlov, 1992 (Russia)
- Deltomerus jeanneli Kurnakov, 1960 (Georgia and Russia)
- Deltomerus jelineki Zamotajlov, 2001 (Iran)
- Deltomerus kabardensis Zamotajlov, 1996 (Russia)
- Deltomerus kataevi Zamotajlov, 1988 (Russia)
- Deltomerus khnzoriani Kurnakov, 1960 (Armenia)
- Deltomerus komarovi Zamotajlov, 1988 (Russia)
- Deltomerus korrigani Morvan, 1981 (Iran)
- Deltomerus kovali Zamotajlov, 1988 (Russia)
- Deltomerus kryzhanovskii Zamotajlov, 1988 (Russia)
- Deltomerus kurnakovi Zamotajlov, 1988 (Georgia)
- Deltomerus lailensis Zamotajlov, 1994 (Georgia)
- Deltomerus leticus Zamotajlov, 1992 (Georgia)
- Deltomerus lodosi Ledoux, 1976 (Turkey)
- Deltomerus malissorum Apfelbeck, 1918 ((former) Yugoslavia and Albania)
- Deltomerus mercanensis Zamotajlov, 2001 (Turkey)
- Deltomerus mirabilis Zamotajlov, 1992 (Russia)
- Deltomerus miroshnikovi Zamotajlov, 1994 (Russia)
- Deltomerus morvani Zamotajlov, 1990 (Iran)
- Deltomerus nopcsae Csiki, 1940 ((former) Yugoslavia)
- Deltomerus osseticus Zamotajlov, 1992 (Russia)
- Deltomerus paradoxus Apfelbeck, 1908 (Albania and North Macedonia)
- Deltomerus parumpunctatus Zamotajlov, 1990 (Albania)
- Deltomerus pjatigorianus Zamotajlov, 1996 (Russia)
- Deltomerus pseudoplatynus Reitter, 1887 (Russia)
- Deltomerus punctatissimus (Fairmaire, 1859) (Algeria and Tunisia)
- Deltomerus punctatus Heinz & Ledoux, 1987 (Turkey)
- Deltomerus raddei Putzeys, 1878 (Georgia)
- Deltomerus redoni Antoine, 1928 (Morocco)
- Deltomerus sergeii Zamotajlov, 1988 (Russia)
- Deltomerus sharovae Zamotajlov, 2001 (Turkey)
- Deltomerus sokolovi Zamotajlov, 1988 (Russia)
- Deltomerus sterbai (Rambousek, 1909) (North Macedonia)
- Deltomerus tatricus (L.Miller, 1859) (Poland and Slovakia)
- Deltomerus tibialis Reitter, 1887 (Georgia and Russia)
- Deltomerus triseriatus Putzeys, 1878 (Georgia)
- Deltomerus tshetshenicus Zamotajlov, 1992 (Russia)
- Deltomerus validus (Chaudoir, 1846) (Georgia and Turkey)
- Deltomerus veldkampi Muilwijk, 2015 (Iran)
- Deltomerus weiratheri G.Müller, 1937 (Greece)
- Deltomerus werneri Reitter, 1906 (Georgia)
