= Himalopenetretus =

Scientific classification
- Domain: Eukaryota
- Kingdom: Animalia
- Phylum: Arthropoda
- Class: Insecta
- Order: Coleoptera
- Suborder: Adephaga
- Family: Carabidae
- Subfamily: Patrobinae
- Tribe: Patrobini
- Subtribe: Patrobina
- Genus: Himalopenetretus; Zamotajlov, 2002

Genus of beetles

Himalopenetretus is a genus of ground beetles in the family Carabidae. There are at least three described species in Himalopenetretus.

== Species ==
These three species belong to the genus Himalopenetretus:

- Himalopenetretus burangensis Yan; H.Shi & Liang, 2020 (China)
- Himalopenetretus falciger (Heinz & Ledoux, 1990) (Pakistan)
- Himalopenetretus franzi (Zamotajlov & Sciaky, 1998) (India)
