= Lissopogonus =

Scientific classification
- Domain: Eukaryota
- Kingdom: Animalia
- Phylum: Arthropoda
- Class: Insecta
- Order: Coleoptera
- Suborder: Adephaga
- Family: Carabidae
- Subfamily: Patrobinae
- Tribe: Lissopogonini
- Genus: Lissopogonus; Andrewes, 1923

Genus of beetles

Lissopogonus is a genus of ground beetles in the family Carabidae. There are about eight described species in Lissopogonus.

== Species ==
These eight species belong to the genus Lissopogonus:

- Lissopogonus borneensis Baehr, 2001 (Borneo and Indonesia)
- Lissopogonus glabellus Andrewes, 1923 (Afghanistan, India, and Laos)
- Lissopogonus loebli Deuve, 2009 (Nepal)
- Lissopogonus morvani Deuve, 2009 (Nepal)
- Lissopogonus nanlingensis (Deuve & Tian, 2001) (China)
- Lissopogonus poecilus Andrewes, 1933 (Indonesia)
- Lissopogonus suensoni Kirschenhofer, 1991 (China)
- Lissopogonus tonkinensis Zamotajlov & Sciaky, 1996 (Vietnam)
