= Platidiolus vandykei =

Scientific classification
- Domain: Eukaryota
- Kingdom: Animalia
- Phylum: Arthropoda
- Class: Insecta
- Order: Coleoptera
- Suborder: Adephaga
- Family: Carabidae
- Genus: Platidiolus
- Species: P. vandykei

Binomial name
- Platidiolus vandykei Kurnakov, 1960

Species of beetle

Platidiolus vandykei is a species of ground beetle in the family Carabidae. It is found in North America.
