= Diplous rugicollis =

Scientific classification
- Domain: Eukaryota
- Kingdom: Animalia
- Phylum: Arthropoda
- Class: Insecta
- Order: Coleoptera
- Suborder: Adephaga
- Family: Carabidae
- Genus: Diplous
- Species: D. rugicollis

Binomial name
- Diplous rugicollis (Randall, 1838)

Species of beetle

Diplous rugicollis is a species of ground beetle in the family Carabidae. It is found in North America.
