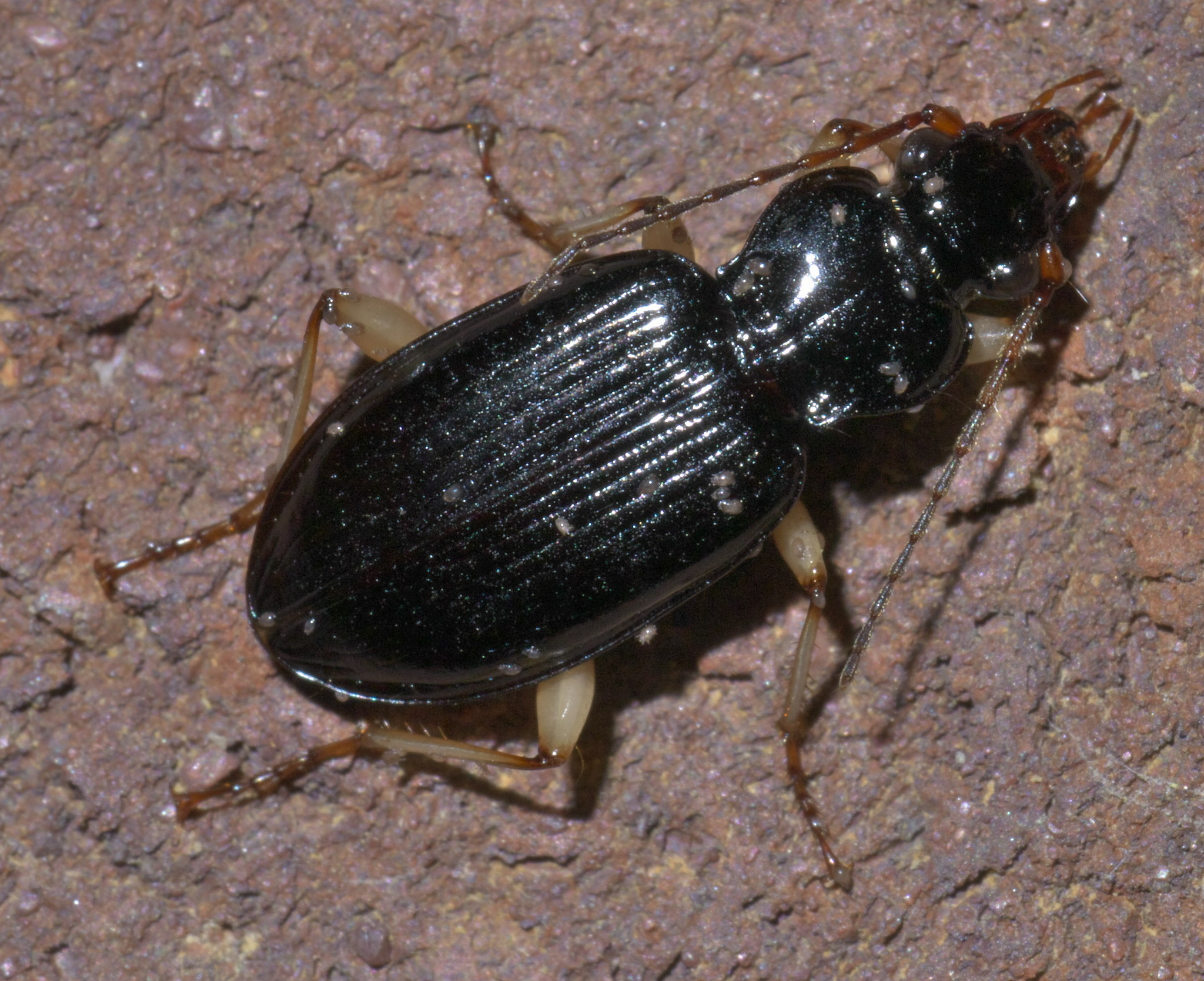
- Patrobus longicornis, Oklahoma

Scientific classification
- Domain: Eukaryota
- Kingdom: Animalia
- Phylum: Arthropoda
- Class: Insecta
- Order: Coleoptera
- Suborder: Adephaga
- Family: Carabidae
- Genus: Patrobus
- Species: P. longicornis

Binomial name
- Patrobus longicornis (Say, 1823)

= Patrobus longicornis =

Species of beetle

Patrobus longicornis is a species of ground beetle in the family Carabidae. It is found in North America.
