= Patrobus cinctus =

Scientific classification
- Kingdom: Animalia
- Phylum: Arthropoda
- Class: Insecta
- Order: Coleoptera
- Suborder: Adephaga
- Family: Carabidae
- Genus: Patrobus
- Species: P. cinctus

Binomial name
- Patrobus cinctus Motschulsky, 1860

Species of beetle

Patrobus cinctus is a species of ground beetle in the family Carabidae. It is found in Europe and Northern Asia (excluding China) and North America.
