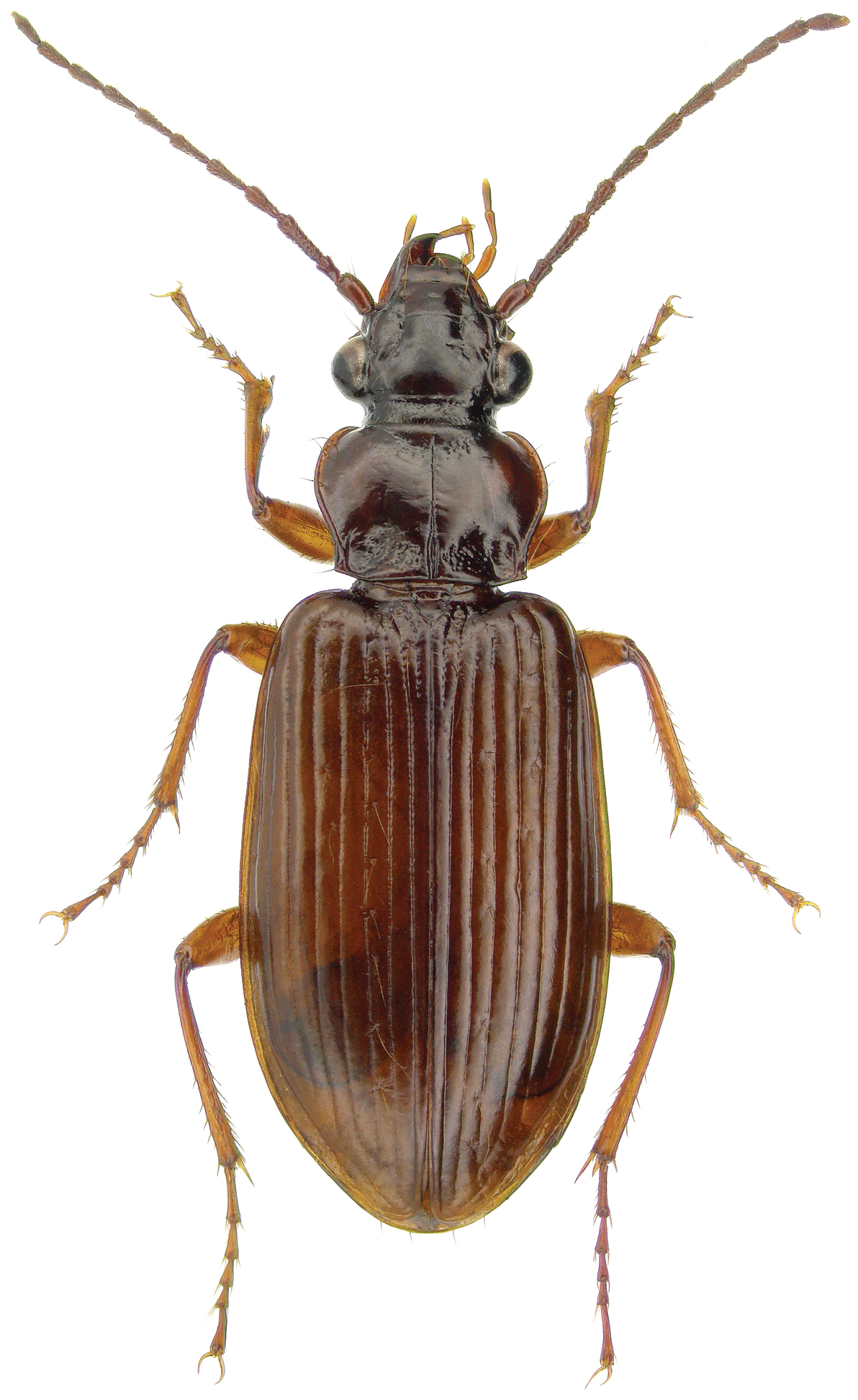

Scientific classification
- Domain: Eukaryota
- Kingdom: Animalia
- Phylum: Arthropoda
- Class: Insecta
- Order: Coleoptera
- Suborder: Adephaga
- Family: Carabidae
- Subfamily: Patrobinae
- Tribe: Patrobini
- Subtribe: Patrobina
- Genus: Platypatrobus; Darlington, 1938
- Species: P. lacustris

Binomial name
- Platypatrobus lacustris Darlington, 1938

= Platypatrobus =

Genus of beetles

Platypatrobus is a genus of ground beetles in the family Carabidae. This genus has a single species, Platypatrobus lacustris. It is found in North America.
