= Patrobus foveocollis =

Scientific classification
- Domain: Eukaryota
- Kingdom: Animalia
- Phylum: Arthropoda
- Class: Insecta
- Order: Coleoptera
- Suborder: Adephaga
- Family: Carabidae
- Genus: Patrobus
- Species: P. foveocollis

Binomial name
- Patrobus foveocollis (Eschscholtz, 1823)

Species of beetle

Patrobus foveocollis is a species of ground beetle in the family Carabidae. It is found in Europe and Northern Asia (excluding China) and North America.
