= Minypatrobus =

Scientific classification
- Domain: Eukaryota
- Kingdom: Animalia
- Phylum: Arthropoda
- Class: Insecta
- Order: Coleoptera
- Suborder: Adephaga
- Family: Carabidae
- Subfamily: Patrobinae
- Tribe: Patrobini
- Subtribe: Patrobina
- Genus: Minypatrobus; Ueno, 1955

Genus of beetles

Minypatrobus is a genus in the ground beetle family Carabidae. There are at least four described species in Minypatrobus, found in Japan.

== Species ==
These four species belong to the genus Minypatrobus:

- Minypatrobus darlingtoni Ueno, 1955
- Minypatrobus hidakanus Zamotajlov & Morita, 2001
- Minypatrobus kasaharai Morita, 2002
- Minypatrobus uenoi (Habu, 1972)
