= Patrobus lecontei =

Scientific classification
- Domain: Eukaryota
- Kingdom: Animalia
- Phylum: Arthropoda
- Class: Insecta
- Order: Coleoptera
- Suborder: Adephaga
- Family: Carabidae
- Genus: Patrobus
- Species: P. lecontei

Binomial name
- Patrobus lecontei Chaudoir, 1872

Species of beetle

Patrobus lecontei is a species of ground beetle in the family Carabidae. It is found in North America.
