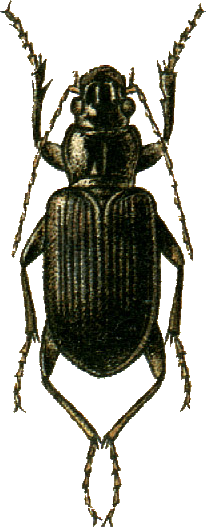
- Diplous depressus

Scientific classification
- Kingdom: Animalia
- Phylum: Arthropoda
- Class: Insecta
- Order: Coleoptera
- Suborder: Adephaga
- Family: Carabidae
- Subfamily: Patrobinae
- Tribe: Patrobini
- Genus: Diplous; Motschulsky, 1850

= Diplous =

Genus of beetles

Diplous is a genus of ground beetles in the family Carabidae. There are more than 20 described species in Diplous.

== Species ==
These 23 species belong to the genus Diplous:

- Diplous aterrimus (Dejean, 1828) (North America)
- Diplous californicus (Motschulsky, 1844) (North America)
- Diplous davidis (Fairmaire, 1891) (China)
- Diplous depressus (Gebler, 1830) (East Asia)
- Diplous filicornis (Casey, 1918) (North America)
- Diplous gansuensis Jedlicka, 1932 (China)
- Diplous giacomazzoi Zamotajlov & Sciaky, 1996 (China)
- Diplous grummi Zamotajlov & Kryzhanovskij, 1990 (China)
- Diplous jedlickai Zamotajlov, 1996 (China)
- Diplous julonshanensis Zamotajlov, 1993 (China)
- Diplous nortoni Andrewes, 1930 (China)
- Diplous petrogorbatschevi Zamotajlov, 1996 (China)
- Diplous przewalskii (Semenov, 1889) (China)
- Diplous rugicollis (Randall, 1838) (North America)
- Diplous sciakyi Zamotajlov, 1996 (China)
- Diplous sibiricus (Motschulsky, 1844) (Palearctic)
- Diplous sterbai Jedlicka, 1932 (China)
- Diplous szetschuanus Jedlicka, 1932 (China)
- Diplous taiwanicus Terada; Yeh & Wu, 2013 (Taiwan and temperate Asia)
- Diplous tonggulensis Zamotajlov & Sciaky, 1996 (China)
- Diplous wrasei Zamotajlov & Sciaky, 1996 (China)
- Diplous wulanensis Zamotajlov, 1998 (China)
- Diplous yunnanus Jedlicka, 1932 (China)
