= Patanitretus =

Scientific classification
- Domain: Eukaryota
- Kingdom: Animalia
- Phylum: Arthropoda
- Class: Insecta
- Order: Coleoptera
- Suborder: Adephaga
- Family: Carabidae
- Tribe: Patrobini
- Subtribe: Patrobina
- Genus: Patanitretus; Zamotajlov, 2002
- Species: P. pakistanensis

Binomial name
- Patanitretus pakistanensis (Heinz & Ledoux, 1987)

Genus of beetles

Patanitretus is a genus of ground beetles in the family Carabidae. This genus has a single species, Patanitretus pakistanensis. It is found in Pakistan.
