= Dimorphopatrobus =

Scientific classification
- Domain: Eukaryota
- Kingdom: Animalia
- Phylum: Arthropoda
- Class: Insecta
- Order: Coleoptera
- Suborder: Adephaga
- Family: Carabidae
- Tribe: Patrobini
- Subtribe: Patrobina
- Genus: Dimorphopatrobus; Casale & Sciaky, 1994
- Species: D. ludmilae

Binomial name
- Dimorphopatrobus ludmilae Casale & Sciaky, 1994

Genus of beetles

Dimorphopatrobus is a genus of ground beetles in the family Carabidae. This genus has a single species, Dimorphopatrobus ludmilae. It is found in China.
