= Quasipenetretus =

Scientific classification
- Domain: Eukaryota
- Kingdom: Animalia
- Phylum: Arthropoda
- Class: Insecta
- Order: Coleoptera
- Suborder: Adephaga
- Family: Carabidae
- Tribe: Patrobini
- Subtribe: Patrobina
- Genus: Quasipenetretus; Zamotajlov, 2002
- Species: Q. berezovskii

Binomial name
- Quasipenetretus berezovskii (Kurnakov, 1963)

Genus of beetles

Quasipenetretus is a genus of ground beetles in the family Carabidae. This genus has a single species, Quasipenetretus berezovskii, found in China.
