= Prodiplous =

Scientific classification
- Domain: Eukaryota
- Kingdom: Animalia
- Phylum: Arthropoda
- Class: Insecta
- Order: Coleoptera
- Suborder: Adephaga
- Family: Carabidae
- Tribe: Patrobini
- Subtribe: Patrobina
- Genus: Prodiplous; Zamotajlov & Sciaky, 2006
- Species: P. businskyi

Binomial name
- Prodiplous businskyi (Casale & Sciaky, 2003)

Genus of beetles

Prodiplous is a genus of ground beetles in the family Carabidae. This genus has a single species, Prodiplous businskyi. It is found in China.
