= Minipenetretus =

Scientific classification
- Domain: Eukaryota
- Kingdom: Animalia
- Phylum: Arthropoda
- Class: Insecta
- Order: Coleoptera
- Suborder: Adephaga
- Family: Carabidae
- Tribe: Patrobini
- Subtribe: Patrobina
- Genus: Minipenetretus; Zamotajlov, 2002
- Species: M. quadraticollis

Binomial name
- Minipenetretus quadraticollis (Bates, 1891)

Genus of beetles

Minipenetretus is a genus of ground beetles in the family Carabidae. This genus has a single species, Minipenetretus quadraticollis. It is found in China.
