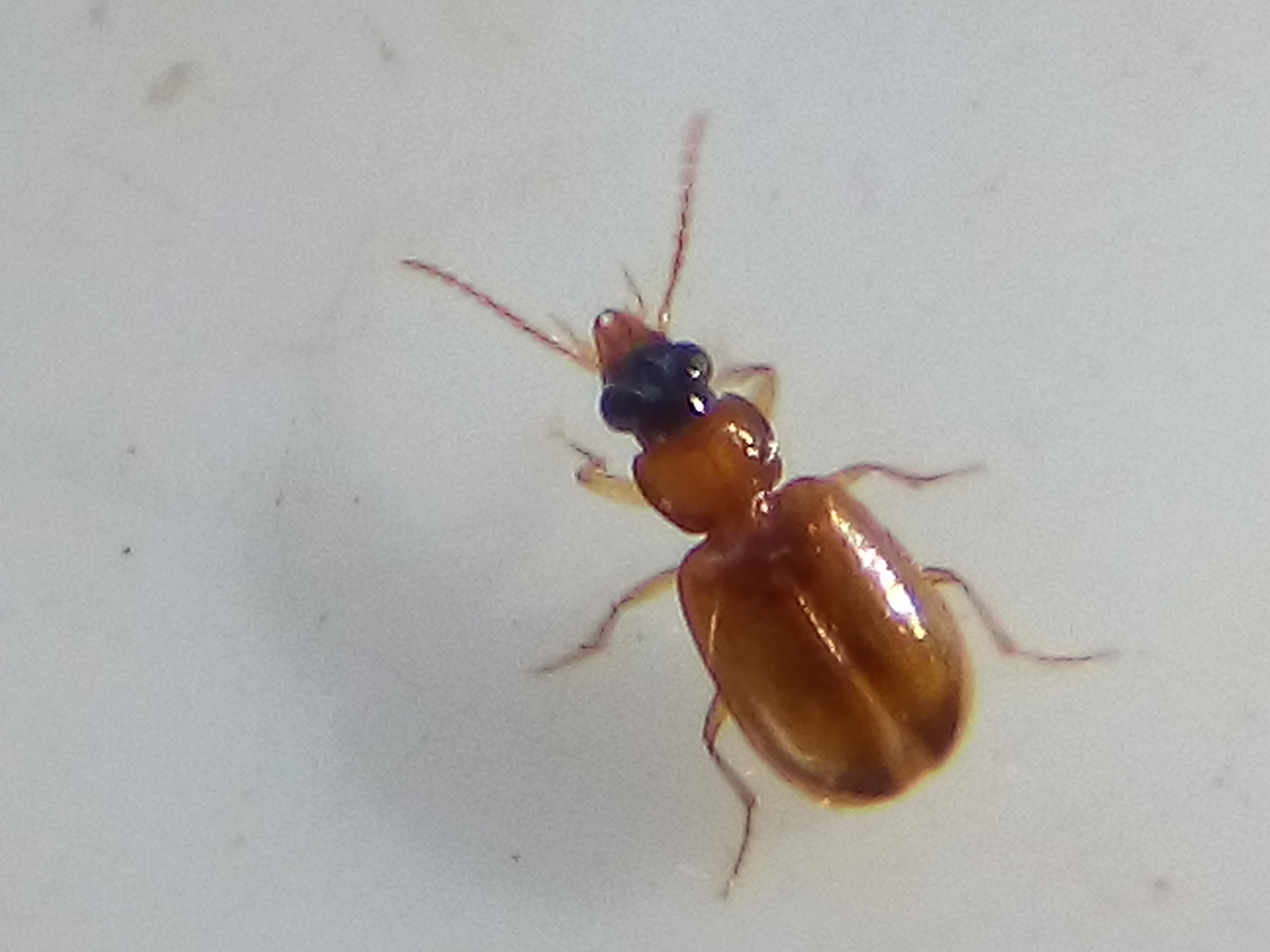
- Perigona nigriceps, New Zealand

Scientific classification
- Kingdom: Animalia
- Phylum: Arthropoda
- Class: Insecta
- Order: Coleoptera
- Suborder: Adephaga
- Family: Carabidae
- Subfamily: Lebiinae
- Tribe: Perigonini; G.Horn, 1881

= Perigonini =

Tribe of beetles

Perigonini is a tribe of ground beetles in the family Carabidae. There are at least 4 genera and more than 200 described species in Perigonini.

== Genera ==
These four genera belong to the tribe Perigonini:

- Diploharpus Chaudoir, 1850
- Mizotrechus Bates, 1872
- Perigona Laporte, 1835
- Ripogenites Basilewsky, 1954
