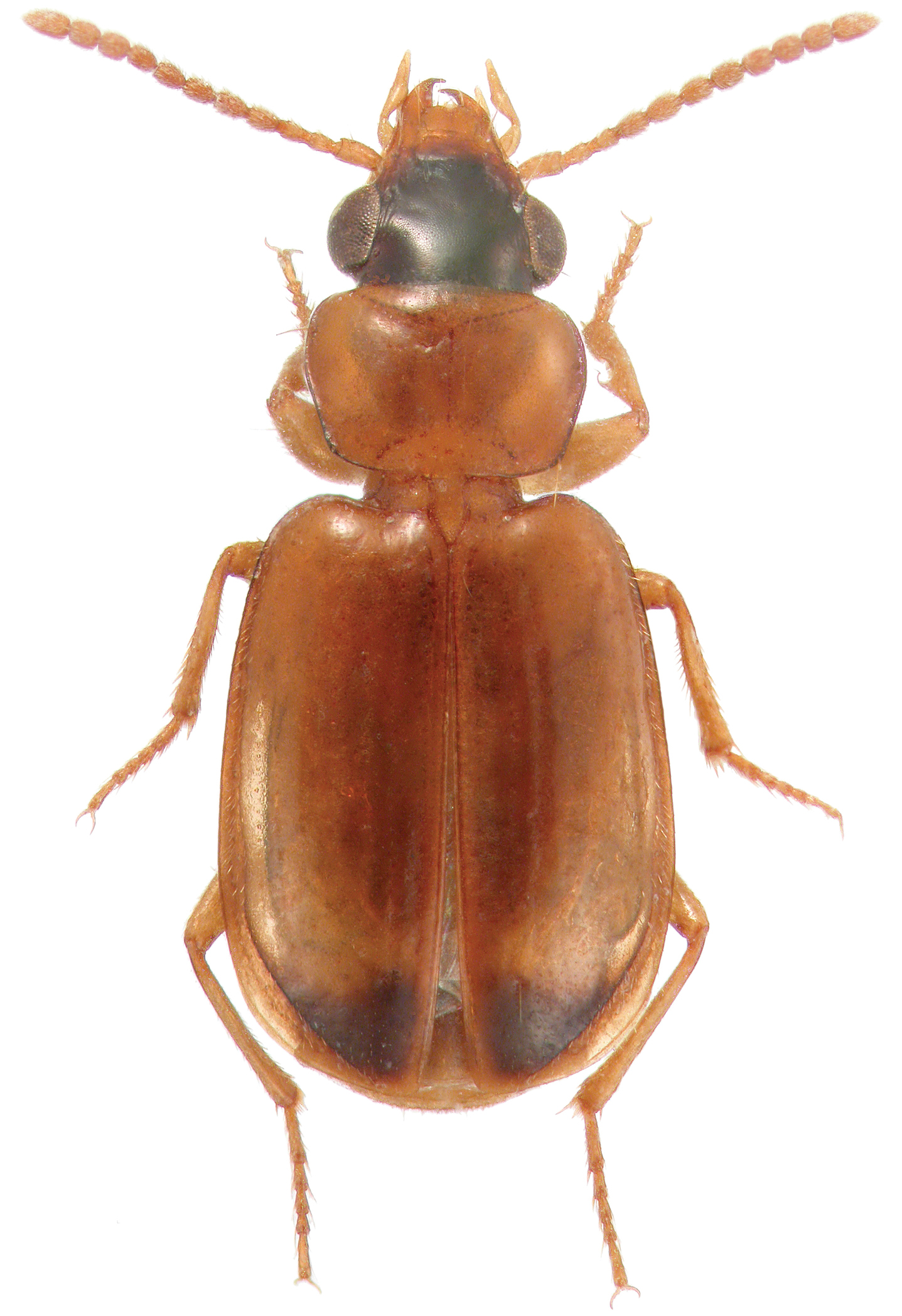

Scientific classification
- Kingdom: Animalia
- Phylum: Arthropoda
- Class: Insecta
- Order: Coleoptera
- Suborder: Adephaga
- Family: Carabidae
- Genus: Perigona
- Species: P. nigriceps

Binomial name
- Perigona nigriceps (Dejean, 1831)

= Perigona nigriceps =

Species of beetle

Perigona nigriceps is a species of ground beetle in the family Carabidae.

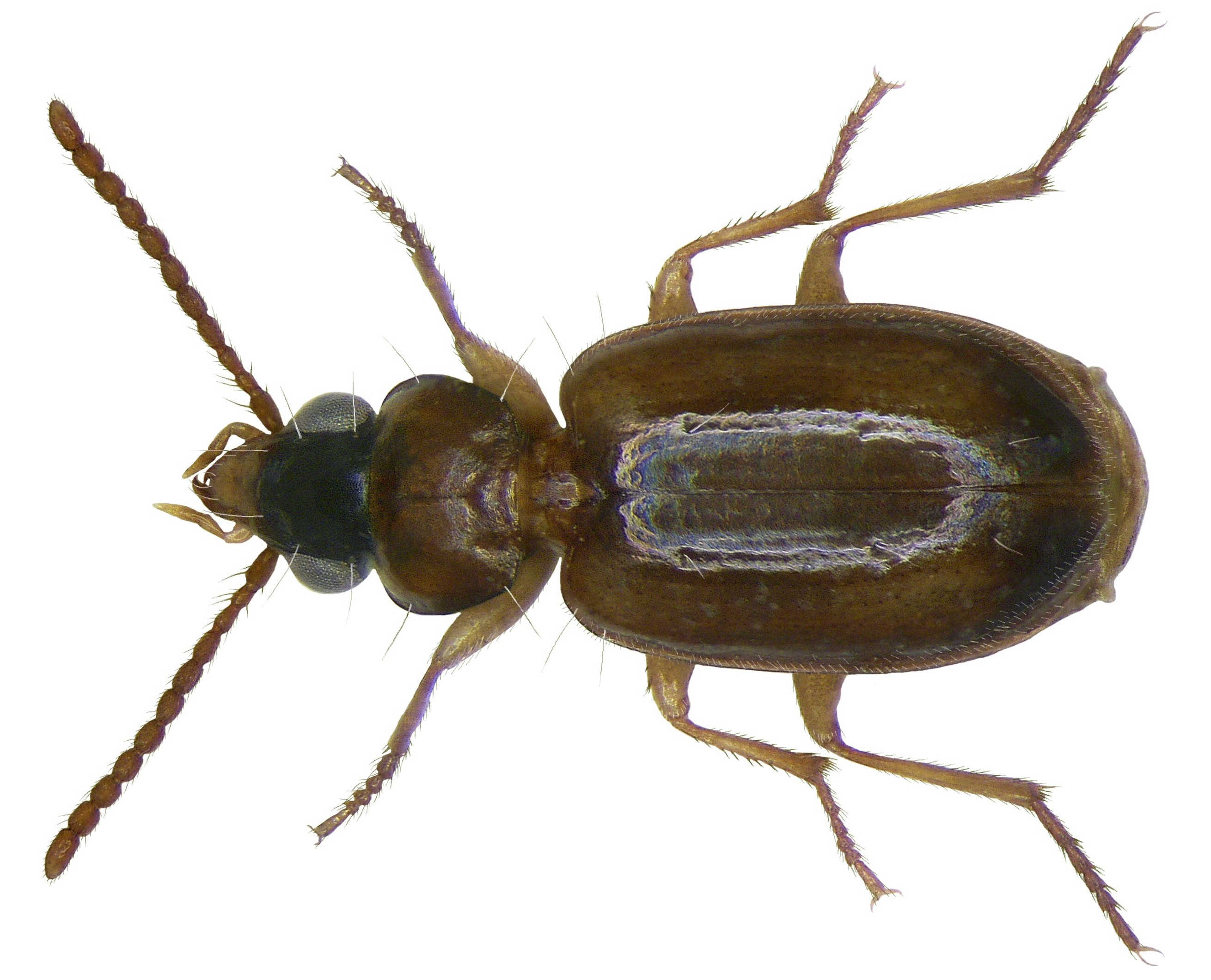
