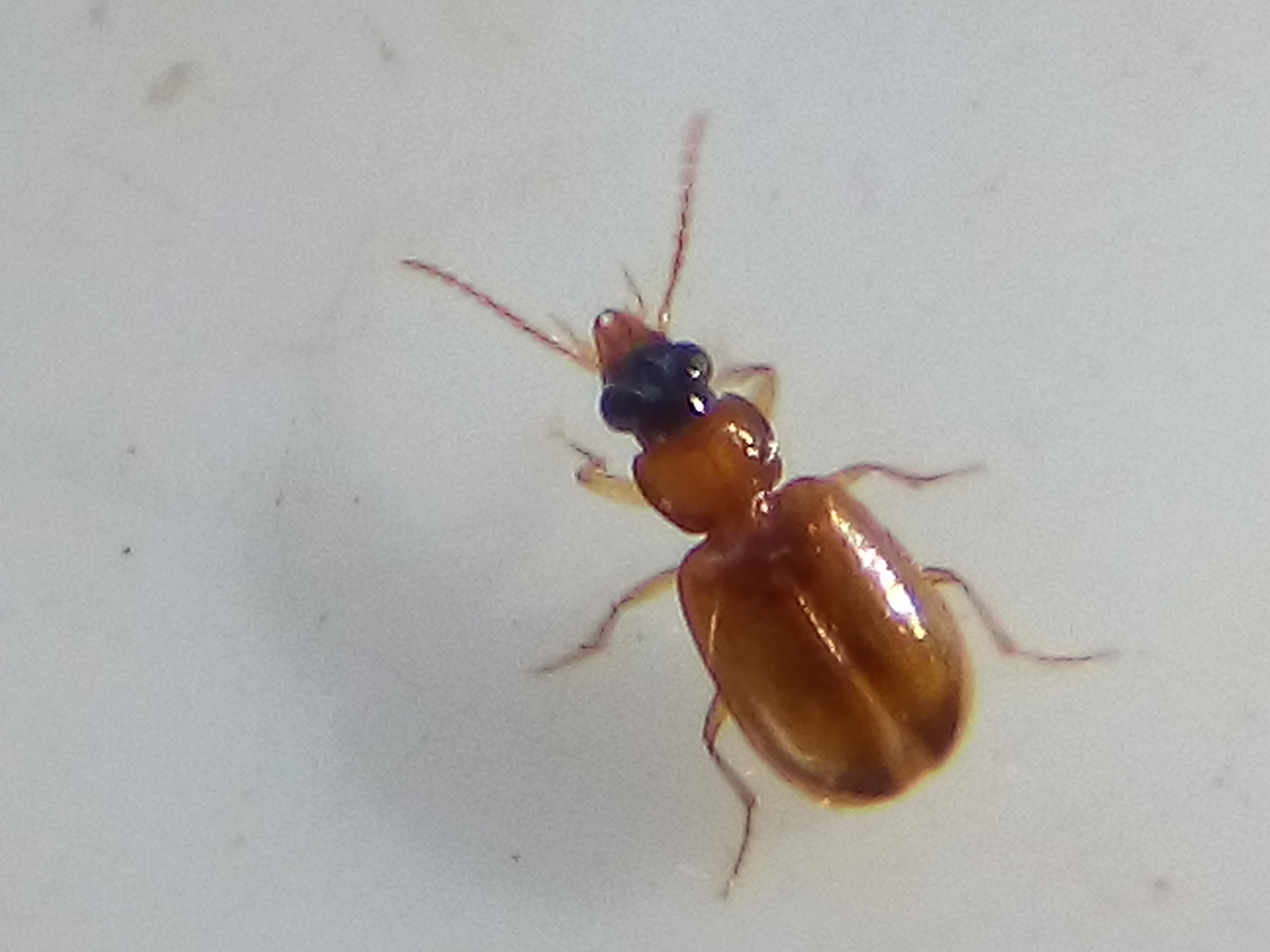
- Perigona nigriceps, New Zealand

Scientific classification
- Kingdom: Animalia
- Phylum: Arthropoda
- Class: Insecta
- Order: Coleoptera
- Suborder: Adephaga
- Family: Carabidae
- Subfamily: Lebiinae
- Tribe: Perigonini
- Genus: Perigona; Laporte, 1835

= Perigona =

Genus of beetles

Perigona is a genus in the beetle family Carabidae. There are more than 170 described species in Perigona.

== Species ==
These 172 species belong to the genus Perigona:

Subgenus Cryptoperigona Perrault, 1985
Perigona gerardi Perrault
Subgenus Euripogena Basilewsky, 1989
Perigona congoana Burgeon, 1935
Perigona leleupi Basilewsky, 1976
Perigona rotundicollis Basilewsky, 1976
Perigona uluguruana Basilewsky, 1976
Subgenus Euryperigona Jeannel, 1941
Perigona grandis Jedlicka, 1935
Perigona procera Fauvel, 1907
Perigona rex Darlington, 1968
Subgenus Neoperigona Perrault, 1988
Perigona belloi Giachino; Moret & Picciau, 2008
Perigona laevigata (Bates, 1872)
Perigona sexstriata (Bates, 1872)
Perigona vixstriata (Bates, 1872)
Subgenus Perigona Laporte, 1835

Perigona acupalpoides Bates, 1883
Perigona affinis Baehr, 2013
Perigona andrewesi Jedlicka, 1935
Perigona angustata Fauvel, 1907
Perigona angustibasis Baehr, 2013
Perigona angustimargo Baehr, 2013
Perigona arrowi Jedlicka, 1935
Perigona bigener Bates, 1892
Perigona bolmi Baehr, 2013
Perigona borneensis Baehr, 2013
Perigona breviuscula (Motschulsky, 1862)
Perigona brunnea Andrewes, 1930
Perigona castanea (Motschulsky, 1861)
Perigona celebensis Baehr, 2013
Perigona columbiana Putzeys, 1878
Perigona convexicollis Putzeys, 1875
Perigona coquerelii Fairmaire, 1869
Perigona cordata Baehr, 2013
Perigona cordicollis Bates, 1882
Perigona crockerensis Baehr, 2014
Perigona denticulata Baehr, 2013
Perigona erythroma Andrewes, 1929
Perigona exigua (A.Morawitz, 1863)
Perigona flavosuturata Baehr, 2013
Perigona glabripennis Baehr, 2013
Perigona guadeloupensis Fleutiaux & Sallé, 1890
Perigona infuscata Sloane, 1904
Perigona inquilina Baehr, 2013
Perigona jacobsoni Andrewes, 1929
Perigona kaimanae Baehr, 2013
Perigona kitchingi Baehr, 2013
Perigona laevilateris (Bates, 1872)
Perigona lata Andrewes, 1929
Perigona liboloensis R.M.Serrano, 2017
Perigona livens Putzeys, 1873
Perigona malayensis Csiki, 1924
Perigona malayica Baehr, 2013
Perigona mediornata Basilewsky, 1989
Perigona melanocephala Jeannel, 1948
Perigona microphthalma Jeannel, 1950
Perigona microps Darlington, 1934
Perigona minor Putzeys, 1875
Perigona muehlei Baehr, 2013
Perigona nigricollis (Motschulsky, 1851)
Perigona nigrifrons (Motschulsky, 1860)
Perigona nigrociliata Basilewsky, 1953
Perigona nigromarginata Baehr, 2013
Perigona nitidicollis Baehr, 2013
Perigona obscuriceps Louwerens, 1951
Perigona ozaenoides (Bates, 1872)
Perigona pallida Laporte, 1835
Perigona papuana Csiki, 1924
Perigona paralivens Baehr, 2013
Perigona parallela Chaudoir, 1878
Perigona parvicollis Andrewes, 1929
Perigona picea Darlington, 1934
Perigona picipennis Louwerens, 1951
Perigona plagiata Putzeys, 1875
Perigona plesia Alluaud, 1936
Perigona plesioides Jeannel, 1948
Perigona praecisa (Bates, 1872)
Perigona principensis A.Serrano, 2008
Perigona pygmaea Andrewes, 1930
Perigona queenslandica Baehr, 2013
Perigona rectangula Baehr, 2013
Perigona retropunctata Baehr, 2013
Perigona riedeli Baehr, 2013
Perigona rossi Darlington, 1968
Perigona rubida Andrewes, 1936
Perigona rufa Baehr, 2013
Perigona ruficollis (Motschulsky, 1851)
Perigona rufilabris (W.J.MacLeay, 1871)
Perigona schuelkei Baehr, 2013
Perigona serica Andrewes, 1929
Perigona similis Baehr, 2013
Perigona sinuata Bates, 1883
Perigona sinuaticollis Bates, 1886
Perigona spadicea Baehr, 2013
Perigona subcordata Putzeys, 1875
Perigona subcyanescens Putzeys, 1875
Perigona sulcatipennis Andrewes, 1930
Perigona suturalis Putzeys, 1875
Perigona suturella Fairmaire, 1869
Perigona taiwanensis Baehr, 2013
Perigona tozeria Baehr, 2013
Perigona transgrediens Baehr, 2013
Perigona tricolor (Laporte, 1867)
Perigona ullrichi Baehr, 2013
Perigona wachteli Baehr, 2004
Perigona wrasei Baehr, 2013
Perigona yasumatsui Habu, 1953
Perigona zanzibarica Chaudoir, 1878

Subgenus Perigonillus Jeannel, 1935
Perigona endogaea (Jeannel, 1935)
Perigona leleupi (Basilewsky, 1951)
Perigona luberoensis (Basilewsky, 1989)
Subgenus Ripogena Jeannel, 1941
Perigona bembidioides Alluaud, 1936
Perigona descarpentriesi (Deuve, 1998)
Perigona deuvei Kavanaugh & Rainio, 2016
Perigona heterodera Alluaud, 1936
Perigona kivuana (Basilewsky, 1989)
Perigona maynei Basilewsky, 1949
Perigona milicola (Basilewsky, 1950)
Perigona prasina Alluaud, 1936
Perigona ranomafanae Kavanaugh & Rainio, 2016
Perigona ruandana (Basilewsky, 1956)
Perigona schoutedeni (Leleup, 1954)
Perigona viridimicans (Jeannel, 1948)
Subgenus Trechicus LeConte, 1853

Perigona africana Csiki, 1924
Perigona angolana (Basilewsky, 1989)
Perigona aterrima Baehr, 2013
Perigona brachypennis Baehr, 2013
Perigona cordens Darlington, 1968
Perigona darlingtoni Baehr, 2013
Perigona dentifera Darlington, 1968
Perigona dorsata Darlington, 1964
Perigona drumonti Baehr, 2013
Perigona dumogae Baehr, 2013
Perigona erimae Csiki, 1924
Perigona fakfak Baehr, 2013
Perigona fusciceps Baehr, 2013
Perigona hajeki Baehr, 2016
Perigona hirtella Basilewsky, 1953
Perigona irregularis Baehr, 2013
Perigona ituriana (Leleup, 1954)
Perigona jakli Baehr, 2017
Perigona katonae Csiki, 1924
Perigona latibasis Baehr, 2013
Perigona lawrencei Baehr, 2013
Perigona lebioides Csiki, 1924
Perigona litura (Perroud & Montrouzier, 1864)
Perigona ludovici Csiki, 1924
Perigona lutea Baehr, 2013
Perigona macrops Baehr, 2013
Perigona minuscula (Basilewsky, 1989)
Perigona moluccensis Baehr, 2013
Perigona montisferrei Baehr, 2013
Perigona morobe Baehr, 2013
Perigona nigriceps (Dejean, 1831)
Perigona obscurata Alluaud, 1936
Perigona obtusangula Baehr, 2013
Perigona pallipennis (LeConte, 1853)
Perigona panganica Csiki, 1924
Perigona picta Darlington, 1964
Perigona proxima Baehr, 2013
Perigona pubescens Jeannel, 1941
Perigona punctatostriata Baehr, 2013
Perigona rubricincta Baehr, 2013
Perigona rufescens Baehr, 2013
Perigona rufocastanea Baehr, 2013
Perigona schmitzi (Basilewsky, 1989)
Perigona semiflava Baehr, 2013
Perigona sororcula Baehr, 2013
Perigona striatipennis Baehr, 2013
Perigona subrufa Baehr, 2013
Perigona timorensis Baehr, 2017
Perigona tronqueti Perrault, 1988
Perigona tumbana (Basilewsky, 1956)

Subgenus Typhlonestra Jeannel, 1935
Perigona elgonensis (Jeannel, 1935)
Perigona tonkinensis (Silvestri, 1946)
Subgenus Xenogona Jeannel, 1941
Perigona termitis Jeannel, 1941
Subgenus Xenogonilla Basilewsky, 1989
Perigona franzi (Basilewsky, 1961)
