= Mizotrechus =

Scientific classification
- Domain: Eukaryota
- Kingdom: Animalia
- Phylum: Arthropoda
- Class: Insecta
- Order: Coleoptera
- Suborder: Adephaga
- Family: Carabidae
- Tribe: Perigonini
- Genus: Mizotrechus; Bates, 1872

Genus of beetles

Mizotrechus is a genus of beetles in the family Carabidae, first described by Henry Walter Bates in 1872.

== Species ==
Mizotrechus contains the following eighteen species:

- Mizotrechus batesi Erwin, 2011
- Mizotrechus bellorum Erwin, 2011
- Mizotrechus belvedere Erwin, 2011
- Mizotrechus brulei Erwin, 2011
- Mizotrechus chontalesensis Erwin, 2011
- Mizotrechus costaricensis Erwin, 2011
- Mizotrechus dalensi Erwin, 2011
- Mizotrechus edithpiafae Erwin, 2011
- Mizotrechus fortunensis Erwin, 2011
- Mizotrechus gorgona Erwin, 2011
- Mizotrechus grossus Erwin, 2011
- Mizotrechus jefe Erwin, 2011
- Mizotrechus marielaforetae Erwin, 2011
- Mizotrechus minutus Erwin, 2011
- Mizotrechus neblinensis Erwin, 2011
- Mizotrechus novemstriatus Bates, 1872
- Mizotrechus poirieri Erwin, 2011
- Mizotrechus woldai Erwin, 2011
