= Ripogenites =

Scientific classification
- Domain: Eukaryota
- Kingdom: Animalia
- Phylum: Arthropoda
- Class: Insecta
- Order: Coleoptera
- Suborder: Adephaga
- Family: Carabidae
- Subfamily: Lebiinae
- Tribe: Perigonini
- Genus: Ripogenites; Basilewsky, 1954

Genus of beetles

Ripogenites is a genus in the ground beetle family Carabidae. There are at least two described species in Ripogenites, found in Madagascar.

== Species ==
These two species belong to the genus Ripogenites:

- Ripogenites gigas Basilewsky, 1954
- Ripogenites obsoletus Basilewsky, 1954
