= Diploharpus =

Scientific classification
- Kingdom: Animalia
- Phylum: Arthropoda
- Class: Insecta
- Order: Coleoptera
- Suborder: Adephaga
- Family: Carabidae
- Subfamily: Lebiinae
- Genus: Diploharpus; Chaudoir, 1850

Genus of beetles

Diploharpus is a genus of beetles in the family Carabidae, containing the following species:

- Diploharpus ebeninus Bates, 1872
- Diploharpus exstriatus Bates, 1878
- Diploharpus laevigatus Perrault, 1992
- Diploharpus laevissimus Chaudoir, 1850
- Diploharpus mexicanus (Chevrolat, 1841)
- Diploharpus perpolitus Bates, 1882
- Diploharpus rubripes Bates, 1872
- Diploharpus striolatus Bates, 1872
- Diploharpus termitophilus Perrault, 1992
