= Philorhizus vectensis =

Scientific classification
- Domain: Eukaryota
- Kingdom: Animalia
- Phylum: Arthropoda
- Class: Insecta
- Order: Coleoptera
- Suborder: Adephaga
- Family: Carabidae
- Genus: Philorhizus
- Species: P. vectensis

Binomial name
- Philorhizus vectensis (Rye, 1873)

Synonyms
- Dromius vectensis Rye, 1873; Dromius netushili Reitter, 1905

Species of beetle

Philorhizus vectensis is a species of brown coloured ground beetle in the Lebiinae subfamily that can be found in British Isles, France, Portugal, and Spain.

== Description habitat ==
It is 3.2–3.7 millimetres (0.13–0.15 in) long with black head and straw coloured elytron. Its elytron have a transverse band that is dark in colour while the shoulders and sides are rounded. The abdomen' underside is black or dark brown while the pronotum is bright red coloured. Its striae is distinct and comes with punctures. The wings are absent. It can be found in vegetated dry sand or shingle.
