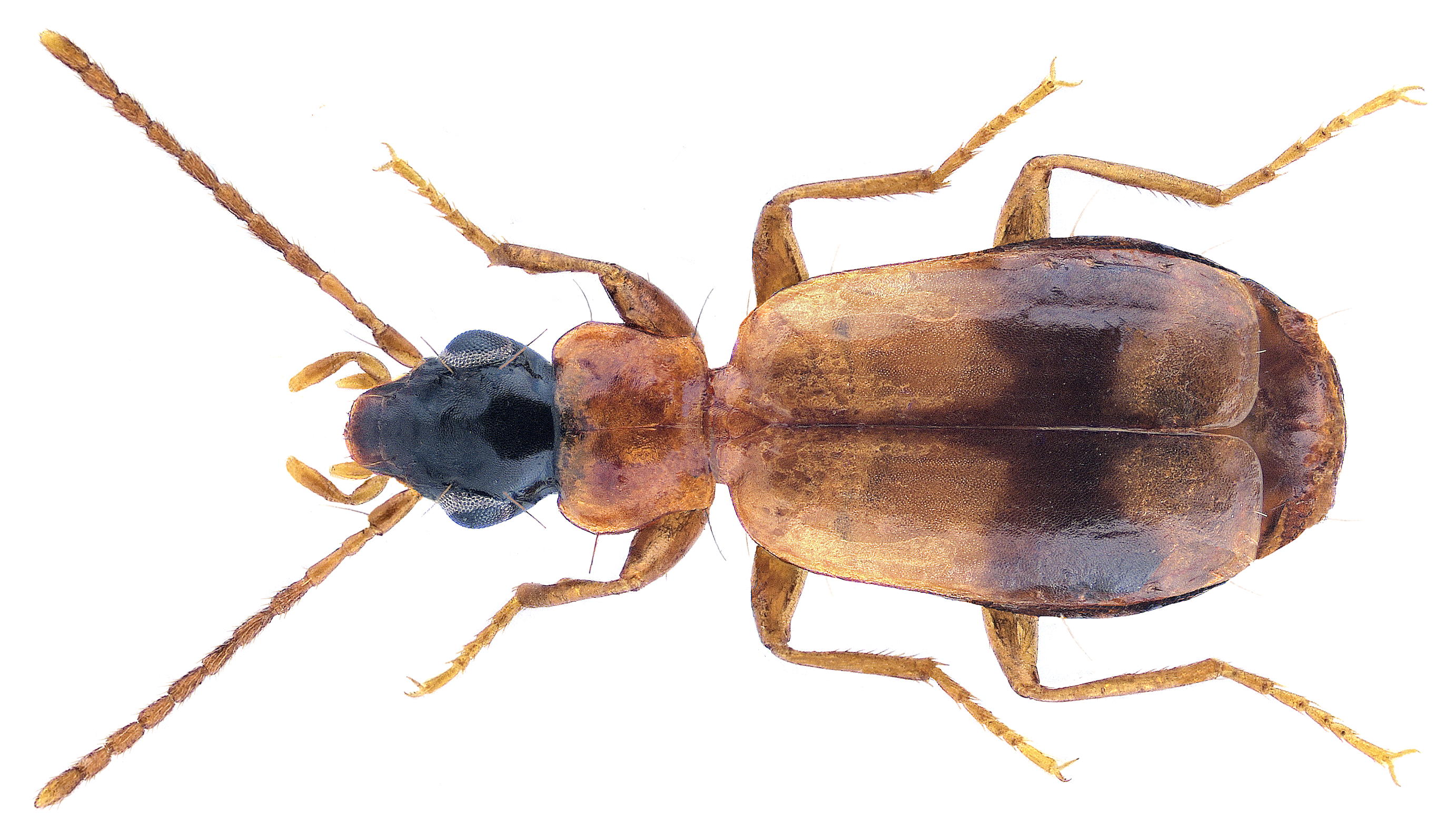
- Philorhizus sigma

Scientific classification
- Domain: Eukaryota
- Kingdom: Animalia
- Phylum: Arthropoda
- Class: Insecta
- Order: Coleoptera
- Suborder: Adephaga
- Family: Carabidae
- Subfamily: Lebiinae
- Tribe: Lebiini
- Genus: Philorhizus
- Species: P. sigma

Binomial name
- Philorhizus sigma (Rossi, 1790)

Synonyms
- Carabus sigma Rossi, 1790; Dromius bipennifer Babington, 1835; Dromius sturmi Babington, 1835; Dromius amurensis Reitter, 1887; Carabus fasciatus Paykull, 1790

= Philorhizus sigma =

Species of beetle

Philorhizus sigma is a species of brown coloured ground beetle in the Lebiinae subfamily that can be found in everywhere in Europe, except for Andorra, Croatia, Monaco, San Marino, Vatican City and European islands. It is also found in such Asian countries as Georgia and Israel.

== Description and habitat ==
It is 3.4–4.4 millimetres (0.13–0.17 in) long with black head and straw coloured elytron. Its elytron is elongate and have a transverse band that is dark in colour. The pronotum is bright red coloured while the wings are absent. It can be found in marshes and fens. The species is considered to be Vulnerable in the United Kingdom.
