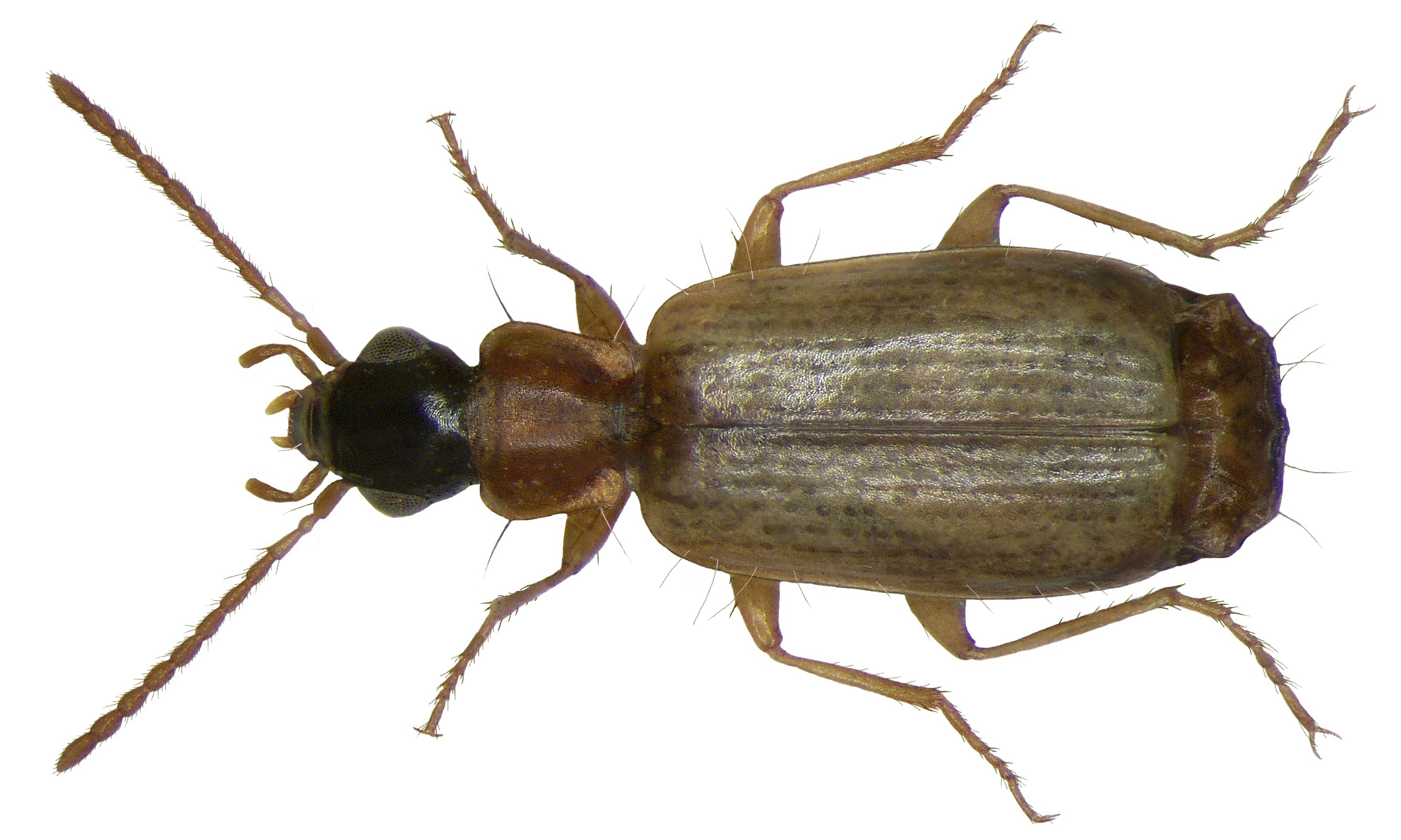

Scientific classification
- Kingdom: Animalia
- Phylum: Arthropoda
- Class: Insecta
- Order: Coleoptera
- Suborder: Adephaga
- Family: Carabidae
- Genus: Philorhizus
- Species: P. melanocephalus

Binomial name
- Philorhizus melanocephalus (Dejean, 1825)

= Philorhizus melanocephalus =

Species of beetle

Philorhizus melanocephalus is a species of ground beetle in the family Carabidae. It is found in North America, Europe, temperate Asia, and Africa.
