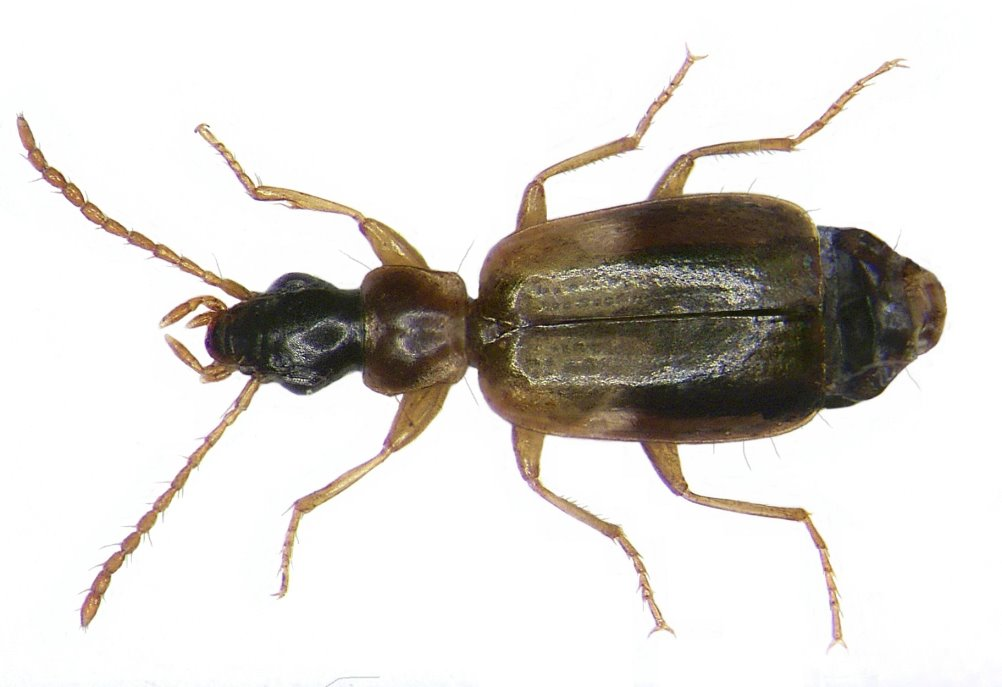
- Philorhizus notatus

Scientific classification
- Domain: Eukaryota
- Kingdom: Animalia
- Phylum: Arthropoda
- Class: Insecta
- Order: Coleoptera
- Suborder: Adephaga
- Family: Carabidae
- Subfamily: Lebiinae
- Tribe: Lebiini
- Genus: Philorhizus; Hope, 1838

= Philorhizus =

Genus of beetles

Philorhizus is a genus in the beetle family Carabidae. There are more than 50 described species in Philorhizus.

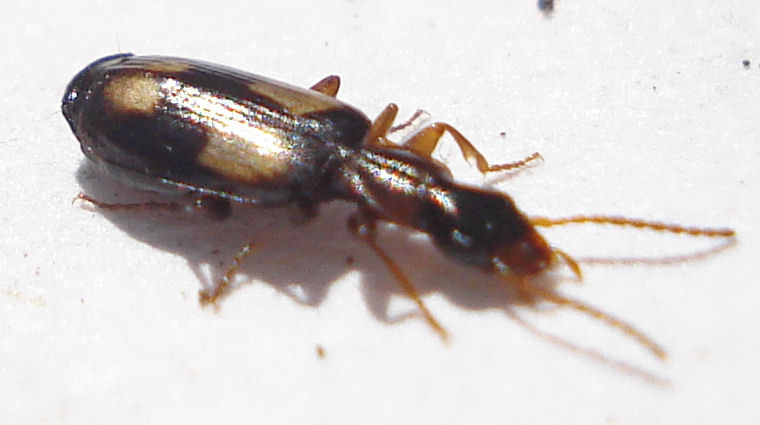
Philorhizus quadrisignatus

== Species ==
These 51 species belong to the genus Philorhizus:

- Philorhizus adoxus (Andrewes, 1923) (China, Pakistan, Bhutan, India)
- Philorhizus alpinus (Meschnigg, 1934) (Greece)
- Philorhizus alticola Basilewsky, 1948 (Kenya)
- Philorhizus atlanticus Mateu, 1957 (the Canary Islands)
- Philorhizus atriceps (LeConte, 1880) (United States)
- Philorhizus attenuatus (Wollaston, 1867) (Cape Verde)
- Philorhizus berberus Antoine, 1963 (Morocco)
- Philorhizus brandmayri Sciaky, 1991 (Italy)
- Philorhizus bravoorum Mateu, 1957 (the Canary Islands)
- Philorhizus conicipennis (Fauvel, 1905) (Madeira)
- Philorhizus crucifer (Lucas, 1846) (Palearctic)
- Philorhizus dacicus Sciaky, 1991 (Ukraine, Romania, and Russia)
- Philorhizus deceptor (Péringuey, 1896) (South Africa)
- Philorhizus delottoi Basilewsky, 1950 (Eritrea)
- Philorhizus elliptipennis (Wollaston, 1864) (the Canary Islands)
- Philorhizus ferranius Mateu, 1956 (the Canary Islands)
- Philorhizus franzi Machado, 1992 (the Canary Islands)
- Philorhizus fumatus Mateu, 1961 (the Canary Islands)
- Philorhizus incertus (Wollaston, 1864) (the Canary Islands)
- Philorhizus insignis (Lucas, 1846) (Spain, North Africa)
- Philorhizus kenyacus Mateu, 1985 (Kenya)
- Philorhizus kilimanus Mateu, 1985 (Tanzania)
- Philorhizus kirgisicus Komarov & Kabak, 1995 (Kyrgyzstan)
- Philorhizus koenigi (Reitter, 1887) (Russia)
- Philorhizus liguricus Sciaky, 1991 (France and Italy)
- Philorhizus lindbergi Mateu, 1956 (the Canary Islands)
- Philorhizus lompei Wrase, 2005 (Greece)
- Philorhizus longicollis (Wollaston, 1865) (the Canary Islands)
- Philorhizus luvubuanus Basilewsky, 1951 (Democratic Republic of the Congo)
- Philorhizus marggii Wrase & Assmann, 2008 (Greece)
- Philorhizus mateui Machado, 1992 (the Canary Islands)
- Philorhizus melanocephalus (Dejean, 1825) (Holarctic)
- Philorhizus mendizabali Mateu & Colas, 1954 (Spain)
- Philorhizus michailovi Komarov & Kabak, 1995 (Tadzhikistan)
- Philorhizus nonfriedi (Reitter, 1898) (Turkey and Georgia)
- Philorhizus notatus (Stephens, 1827) (Palearctic)
- Philorhizus occitanus Allegro et al, 2015 (Italy)
- Philorhizus oculatus (Kuntzen, 1919) (Angola, Namibia, South Africa)
- Philorhizus optimus (Bates, 1873) (Japan)
- Philorhizus parvicollis (Wollaston, 1865) (the Canary Islands)
- Philorhizus paulo Wrase, 1995 (France and Spain)
- Philorhizus quadrisignatus (Dejean, 1825) (Palearctic)
- Philorhizus sigma (P.Rossi, 1790) (Palearctic)
- Philorhizus tianshanicus Komarov & Kabak, 1995 (Kazakhstan)
- Philorhizus tinauti Anichtchenko, 2005 (Spain)
- Philorhizus trapezicollis (Chaudoir, 1878)
- Philorhizus tuberculipes (Landin, 1955) (Myanmar)
- Philorhizus umbratus (Wollaston, 1865) (Madeira)
- Philorhizus vectensis (Rye, 1873) (Great Britain, France, Spain)
- Philorhizus vieirai Mateu, 1957 (Madeira)
- Philorhizus wollastoni (Fauvel, 1905) (Madeira)
