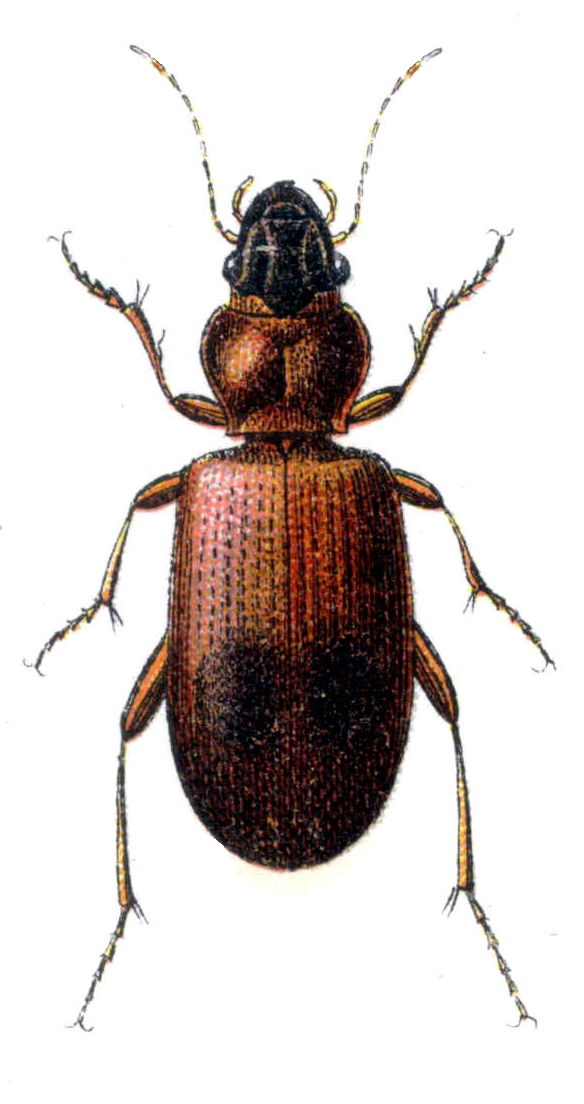
- Blemus discus

Scientific classification
- Kingdom: Animalia
- Phylum: Arthropoda
- Class: Insecta
- Order: Coleoptera
- Suborder: Adephaga
- Family: Carabidae
- Subfamily: Trechinae
- Genus: Blemus; Dejean, 1821

Synonyms
- Lasiotrechus

= Blemus =

Genus of beetles

Blemus is a genus of ground beetle native to the Palearctic (including Europe) and the Nearctic.

Species include:

- Blemus alexandrovi (Lutshnik, 1915)
- Blemus discus (Fabricius, 1792)
