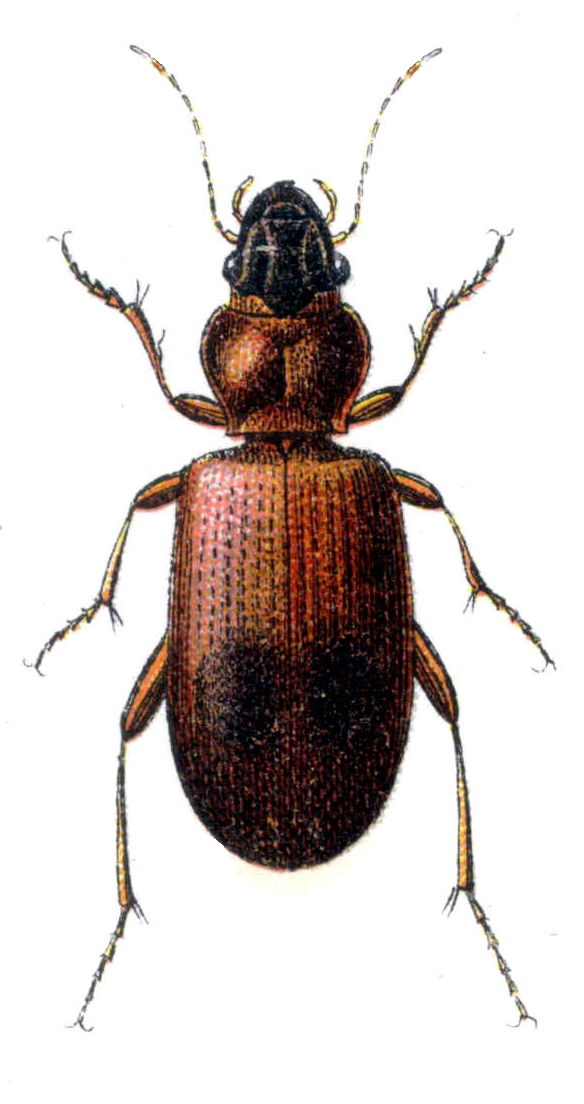

Scientific classification
- Kingdom: Animalia
- Phylum: Arthropoda
- Class: Insecta
- Order: Coleoptera
- Suborder: Adephaga
- Family: Carabidae
- Genus: Blemus
- Species: B. discus

Binomial name
- Blemus discus (Fabricius, 1792)

Subspecies
- Blemus discus discus (Fabricius, 1792) Blemus discus orientalis Jeannel, 1928

= Blemus discus =

Species of beetle

Blemus discus is a ground beetle species in the genus Blemus.

== See also ==
- List of ground beetle (Carabidae) species recorded in Britain
