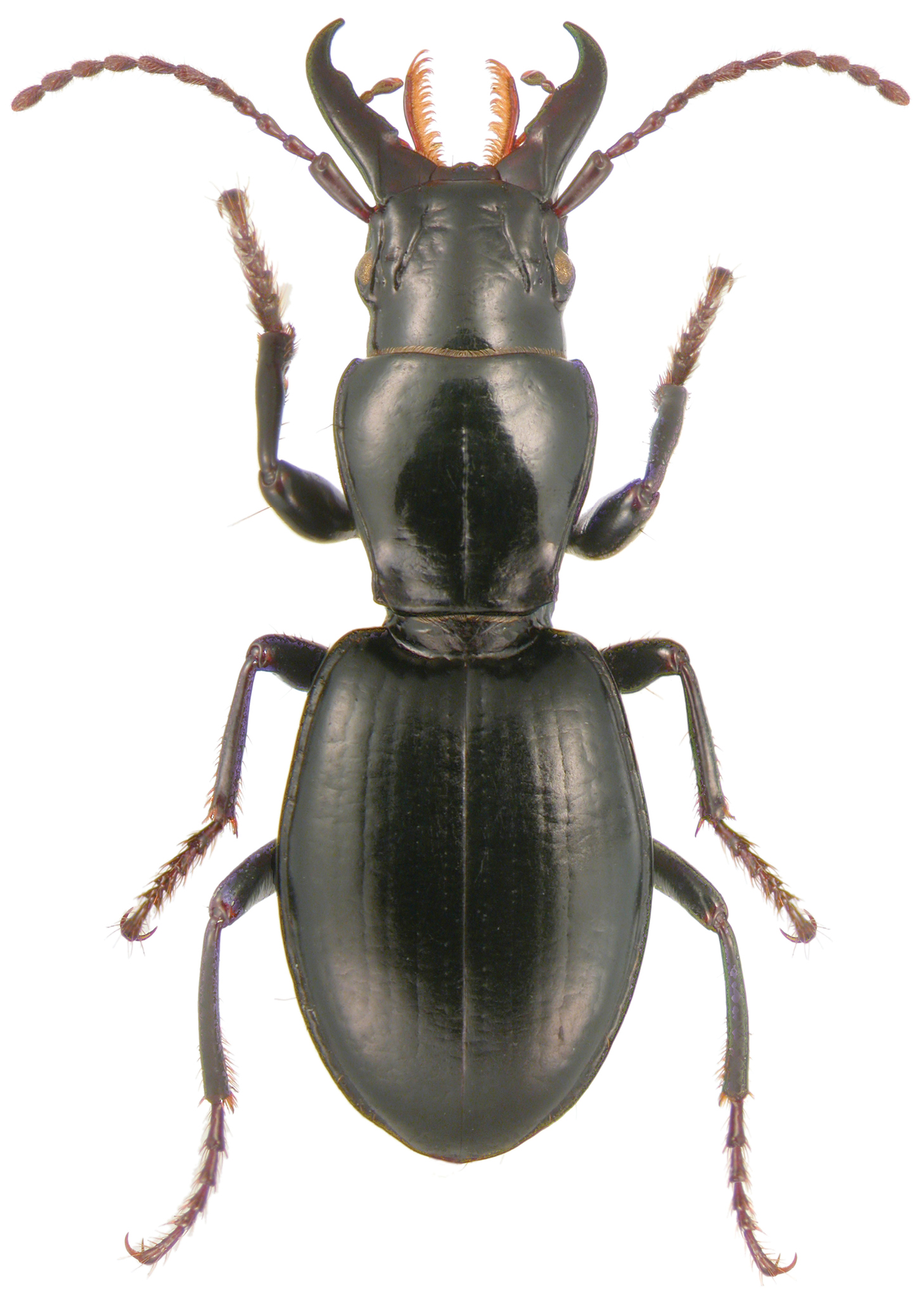
- Promecognathus crassus

Scientific classification
- Kingdom: Animalia
- Phylum: Arthropoda
- Clade: Pancrustacea
- Class: Insecta
- Order: Coleoptera
- Suborder: Adephaga
- Family: Carabidae
- Subfamily: Promecognathinae; LeConte, 1853

= Promecognathinae =

Subfamily of beetles

Promecognathinae is a subfamily of beetles in the family Carabidae. It contains ten species in seven genera:

- Tribe Dalyatini Mateu, 2002
  - Genus Dalyat Mateu, 2002
    - Dalyat mirabilis Mateu, 2002
- Tribe †Palaeoaxinidiini McKay, 1991
  - Genus †Palaeoaxinidium McKay, 1991
    - †Palaeoaxinidium orapense McKay, 1991
- Tribe Promecognathini LeConte, 1853
  - Genus Axinidium Sturm, 1843
    - Axinidium africanum Sturm, 1843
    - Axinidium angulatum Basilewsky, 1963
  - Genus Holaxinidium Basilewsky, 1963
    - Holaxinidium fitsimonsi Basilewsky, 1963
  - Genus Metaxinidium Basilewsky, 1963
    - Metaxinidium leleupi Basilewsky, 1963
    - Metaxinidium nanum Basilewsky, 1963
  - Genus Paraxinidium Basilewsky, 1963
    - Paraxinidium andreaei Basilewsky, 1963
  - Genus Promecognathus Chaudoir, 1846
    - Promecognathus crassus LeConte, 1868
    - Promecognathus laevissimus Dejean, 1829
