= Andinodontis =

Scientific classification
- Domain: Eukaryota
- Kingdom: Animalia
- Phylum: Arthropoda
- Class: Insecta
- Order: Coleoptera
- Suborder: Adephaga
- Family: Carabidae
- Subfamily: Trechinae
- Tribe: Bembidarenini
- Genus: Andinodontis; Erwin & Toledano, 2010

Genus of beetles

Andinodontis is a genus of ground beetles in the family Carabidae. There are at least four described species in Andinodontis.

== Species ==
These four species belong to the genus Andinodontis:

- Andinodontis guzzettii Toledano & Erwin, 2010 (Bolivia)
- Andinodontis maveetyae Erwin & Maddison, 2010 (Peru)
- Andinodontis moreti Erwin & Toledano, 2010 (Ecuador)
- Andinodontis muellermotzfeldi Toledano & Erwin, 2010 (Ecuador)
