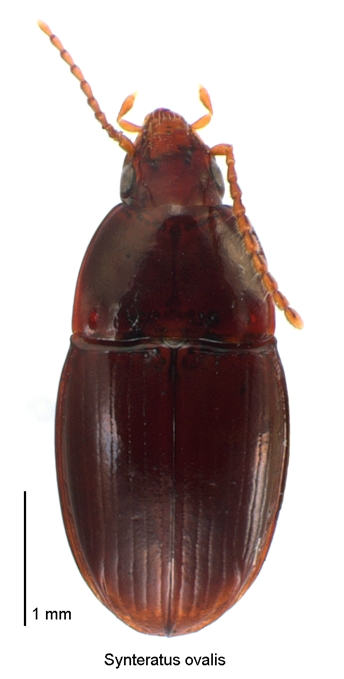
- Synteratus ovalis

Scientific classification
- Kingdom: Animalia
- Phylum: Arthropoda
- Class: Insecta
- Order: Coleoptera
- Suborder: Adephaga
- Family: Carabidae
- Subfamily: Trechinae
- Tribe: Zolini
- Subtribe: Merizodontina
- Genus: Synteratus; Broun, 1909
- Species: S. ovalis

Binomial name
- Synteratus ovalis Broun, 1909

= Synteratus =

Genus of beetles

Synteratus is a genus in the ground beetle family Carabidae. This genus has a single species, Synteratus ovalis. It is found in New Zealand.
