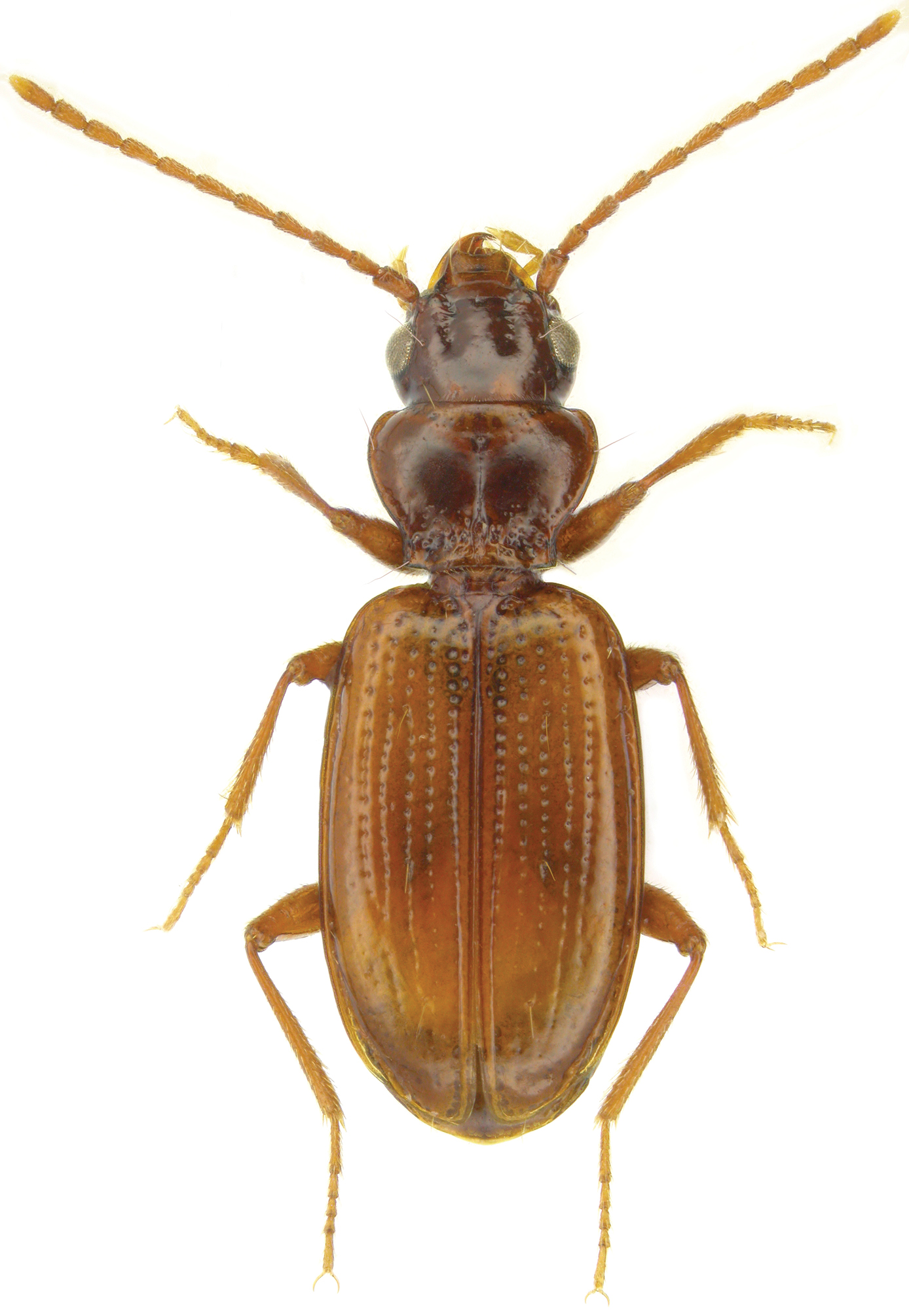
- Phrypeus rickseckeri

Scientific classification
- Kingdom: Animalia
- Phylum: Arthropoda
- Class: Insecta
- Order: Coleoptera
- Suborder: Adephaga
- Family: Carabidae
- Subfamily: Trechinae
- Tribe: Sinozolini
- Genus: Phrypeus; Casey, 1924
- Species: P. rickseckeri

Binomial name
- Phrypeus rickseckeri (Hayward, 1897)

= Phrypeus =

Genus of beetles

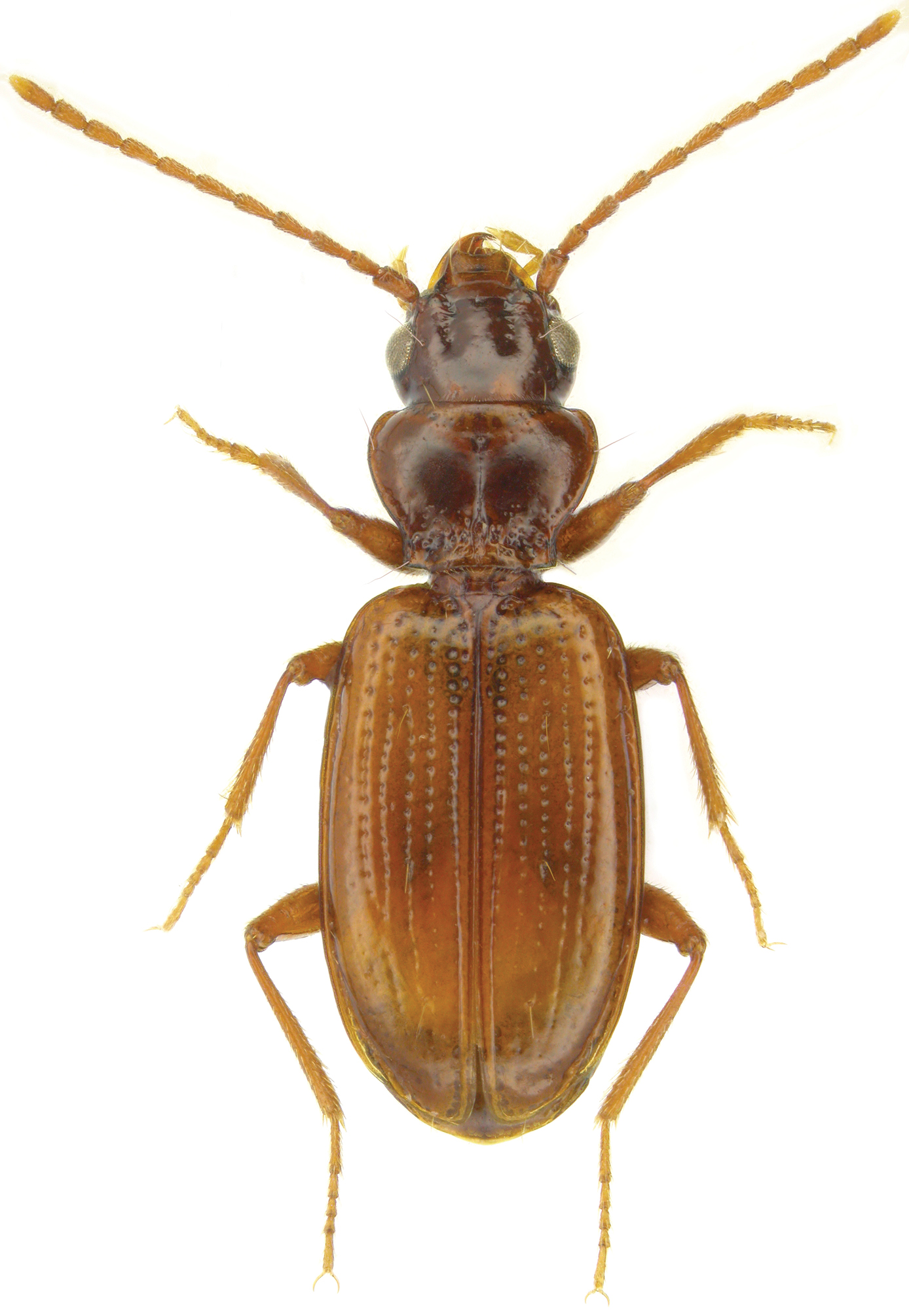
Phrypeus rickseckeri

Phrypeus is a genus of ground beetles in the family Carabidae. This genus has a single species, Phrypeus rickseckeri. It is found in the United States and Canada.
