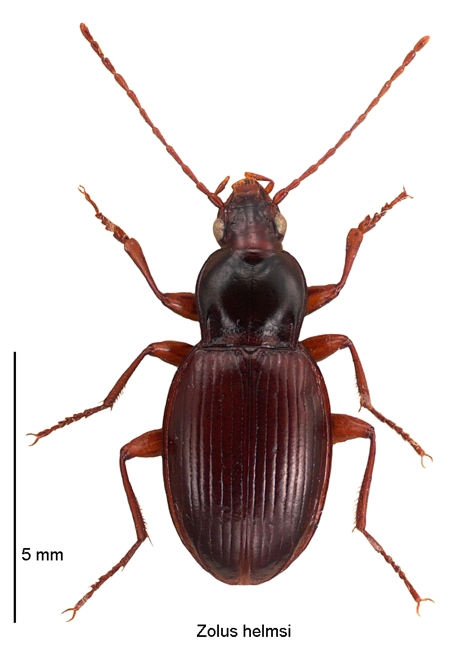
- Zolus helmsi

Scientific classification
- Kingdom: Animalia
- Phylum: Arthropoda
- Class: Insecta
- Order: Coleoptera
- Suborder: Adephaga
- Family: Carabidae
- Subfamily: Trechinae
- Tribe: Zolini
- Subtribe: Zolina
- Genus: Zolus; Sharp, 1886

= Zolus =

Genus of beetles

Zolus is a genus of carabids in the beetle family Carabidae. There are about six described species in Zolus, found in New Zealand.

== Species ==
These six species belong to the genus Zolus:

- Zolus carinatus (Broun, 1882)
- Zolus helmsi Sharp, 1886
- Zolus kauriensis Larochelle & Larivière, 2017
- Zolus subopacus Broun, 1915
- Zolus unisetosus Larochelle & Larivière, 2017
- Zolus wongi Larochelle & Larivière, 2017
