= Sloaneana =

Scientific classification
- Domain: Eukaryota
- Kingdom: Animalia
- Phylum: Arthropoda
- Class: Insecta
- Order: Coleoptera
- Suborder: Adephaga
- Family: Carabidae
- Subfamily: Trechinae
- Tribe: Zolini
- Subtribe: Merizodontina
- Genus: Sloaneana; Csiki, 1933

Genus of beetles

Sloaneana is a genus in the beetle family Carabidae. There are at least four described species in Sloaneana, found in Australia.

== Species ==
These four species belong to the genus Sloaneana:

- Sloaneana curvicollis Baehr, 2015
- Sloaneana lamingtonensis Baehr, 2002
- Sloaneana similis Baehr, 2002
- Sloaneana tasmaniae (Sloane, 1915)
