= Chaltenia =

Scientific classification
- Domain: Eukaryota
- Kingdom: Animalia
- Phylum: Arthropoda
- Class: Insecta
- Order: Coleoptera
- Suborder: Adephaga
- Family: Carabidae
- Subfamily: Trechinae
- Tribe: Sinozolini
- Genus: Chaltenia; Roig-Juñent & Cicchino, 2001
- Species: C. patagonica

Binomial name
- Chaltenia patagonica Roig-Juñent & Cicchino, 2001

Genus of beetles

Chaltenia is a genus of ground beetles in the family Carabidae. This genus has a single species, Chaltenia patagonica. It is found in Argentina.
