= Merizodus =

Scientific classification
- Domain: Eukaryota
- Kingdom: Animalia
- Phylum: Arthropoda
- Class: Insecta
- Order: Coleoptera
- Suborder: Adephaga
- Family: Carabidae
- Subfamily: Trechinae
- Tribe: Zolini
- Subtribe: Merizodontina
- Genus: Merizodus; Solier, 1849

Genus of beetles

Merizodus is a genus in the beetle family Carabidae. There are at least two described species in Merizodus.

== Species ==
These two species belong to the genus Merizodus:

- Merizodus angusticollis Solier, 1849 (Chile and Argentina)
- Merizodus soledadinus (Guérin-Méneville, 1830) (Chile, Argentina, the Falkland Islands, and South Georgia)
