= Sinozolus =

Scientific classification
- Domain: Eukaryota
- Kingdom: Animalia
- Phylum: Arthropoda
- Class: Insecta
- Order: Coleoptera
- Suborder: Adephaga
- Family: Carabidae
- Subfamily: Trechinae
- Tribe: Sinozolini
- Genus: Sinozolus; Deuve, 1997

Genus of beetles

Sinozolus is a genus of ground beetles in the family Carabidae. There are six described species in Sinozolus, all from China.

== Species ==
These six species belong to the genus Sinozolus:

- Sinozolus lopatini Belousov & Kabak, 2005
- Sinozolus micrangulus Belousov & Kabak, 2005
- Sinozolus morvani Deuve, 2007
- Sinozolus ovalis Belousov & Kabak, 2005
- Sinozolus setosus Belousov & Kabak, 2005
- Sinozolus yuae Deuve, 1997
