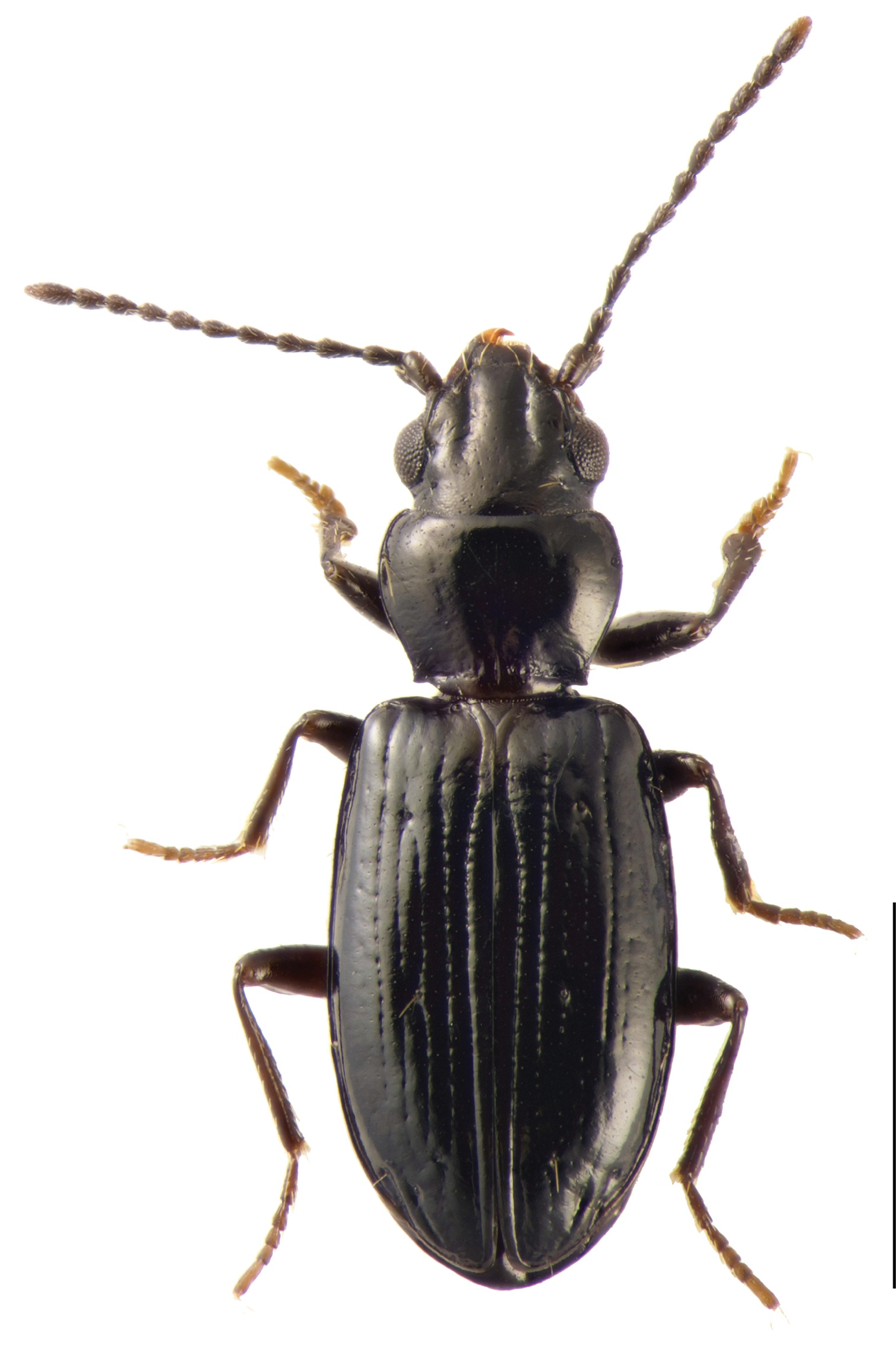
- Tasmanitachoides erwini, Australia

Scientific classification
- Kingdom: Animalia
- Phylum: Arthropoda
- Clade: Pancrustacea
- Class: Insecta
- Order: Coleoptera
- Suborder: Adephaga
- Family: Carabidae
- Subfamily: Trechinae
- Tribe: Bembidarenini
- Genus: Tasmanitachoides; Erwin, 1972

= Tasmanitachoides =

Genus of beetles

Tasmanitachoides is a genus of ground beetles in the family Carabidae, endemic to Australia. The beetles are very small, typically 1.5 to 3.0 mm. in length, and live in coarse sand or fine gravel along freshwater shorelines throughout Australia.

As of 2021, there 27 described species in Tasmanitachoides, descriptions of two of them published in 2021 (T. baehri and T. erwini). Another 5 species are known but, as of 2021, have not yet been described.

The species of this group has been assigned to various genera since the description of the first was published in 1895. In 1972, T. L. Erwin proposed the genus Tasmanitachoides for the group of species. In 2019, Maddison et al. used DNA sequencing and morphological data to determine the Australian genus Tasmanitachoides should be isolated with three South American genera into a new tribe, Bembidarenini.

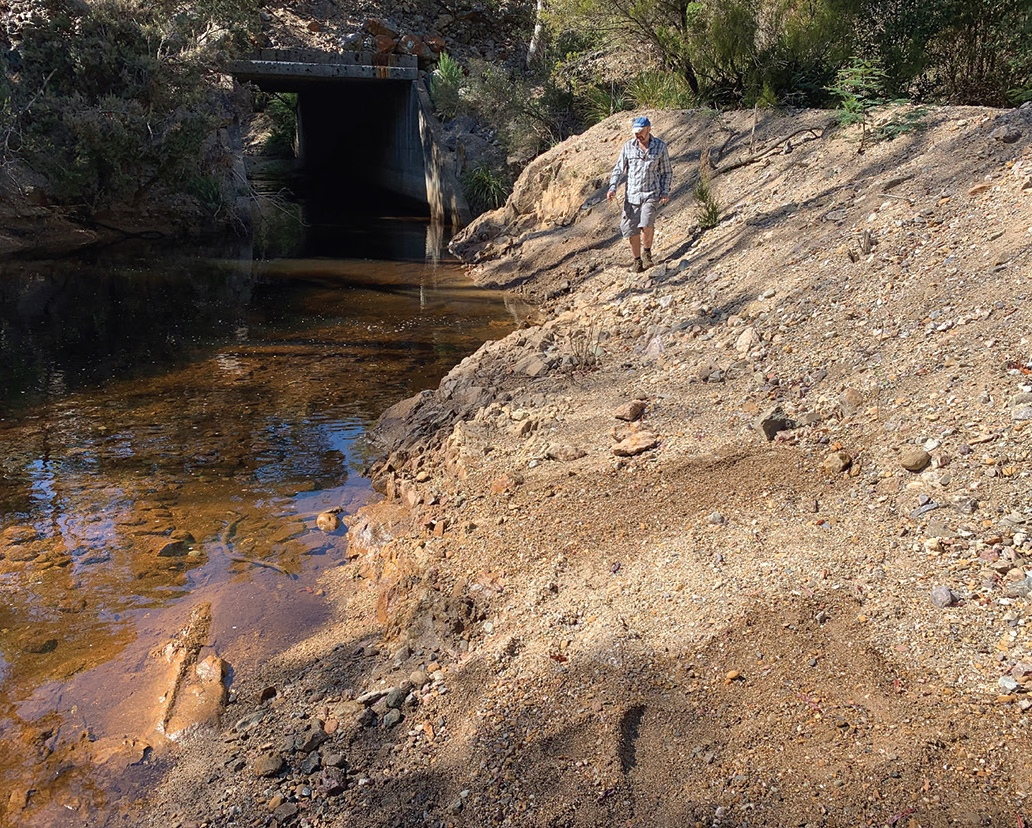
Four species of Tasmanitachoides were found at this location at the mouth of Machinery Creek, Tasmania, Australia.

== Species ==
These 27 species belong to the genus Tasmanitachoides:

- Tasmanitachoides angulicollis Baehr, 1990
- Tasmanitachoides arnhemensis Erwin, 1972
- Tasmanitachoides baehri Maddison & Porch, 2021
- Tasmanitachoides balli Baehr, 2008
- Tasmanitachoides bicolor Baehr, 1990
- Tasmanitachoides comes Baehr, 2010
- Tasmanitachoides elongatulus Baehr
- Tasmanitachoides erwini Maddison & Porch, 2021
- Tasmanitachoides fitzroyi (Darlington, 1962)
- Tasmanitachoides flindersianus Baehr
- Tasmanitachoides gerdi Baehr, 2010
- Tasmanitachoides glabellus Baehr, 2001
- Tasmanitachoides hackeri Baehr, 2008
- Tasmanitachoides hendrichi Baehr, 2008
- Tasmanitachoides hobarti (Blackburn, 1901)
- Tasmanitachoides katherinei Erwin, 1972
- Tasmanitachoides kingi (Darlington, 1962)
- Tasmanitachoides leai (Sloane, 1896)
- Tasmanitachoides lutus (Darlington, 1962)
- Tasmanitachoides maior Baehr, 1990
- Tasmanitachoides mandibularis Baehr, 2009
- Tasmanitachoides minor Baehr, 1990
- Tasmanitachoides murrumbidgensis (Sloane, 1895)
- Tasmanitachoides obliquiceps (Sloane, 1903)
- Tasmanitachoides rufescens Baehr, 1990
- Tasmanitachoides wattsensis (Blackburn, 1901)
- Tasmanitachoides wilsoni (Sloane, 1921)
