= Idacarabus =

Scientific classification
- Domain: Eukaryota
- Kingdom: Animalia
- Phylum: Arthropoda
- Class: Insecta
- Order: Coleoptera
- Suborder: Adephaga
- Family: Carabidae
- Subfamily: Trechinae
- Tribe: Zolini
- Subtribe: Merizodontina
- Genus: Idacarabus; Lea, 1910

Genus of beetles

Idacarabus is a genus in the ground beetle family Carabidae. There are at least four described species in Idacarabus, found in Australia.

== Species ==
These four species belong to the genus Idacarabus:

- Idacarabus cordicollis B.Moore, 1967
- Idacarabus longicollis B.Moore, 1978
- Idacarabus punctipennis B.Moore, 1994
- Idacarabus troglodytes Lea, 1910
