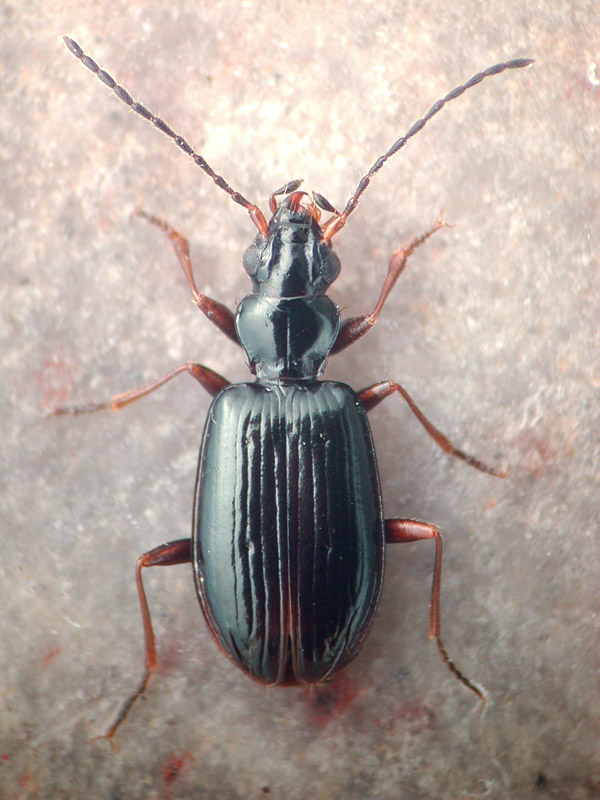
- Bembidarenas reicheellum

Scientific classification
- Kingdom: Animalia
- Phylum: Arthropoda
- Clade: Pancrustacea
- Class: Insecta
- Order: Coleoptera
- Suborder: Adephaga
- Family: Carabidae
- Subfamily: Trechinae
- Tribe: Bembidarenini
- Genus: Bembidarenas; Erwin, 1972

= Bembidarenas =

Genus of beetles

Bembidarenas is a genus of ground beetles in the family Carabidae. There are at least two described species in Bembidarenas, found in South America.

== Species ==
These two species belong to the genus Bembidarenas:

- Bembidarenas reicheellus (Csiki, 1928) (Chile)
- Bembidarenas setiventris Nègre, 1973 (Argentina)
