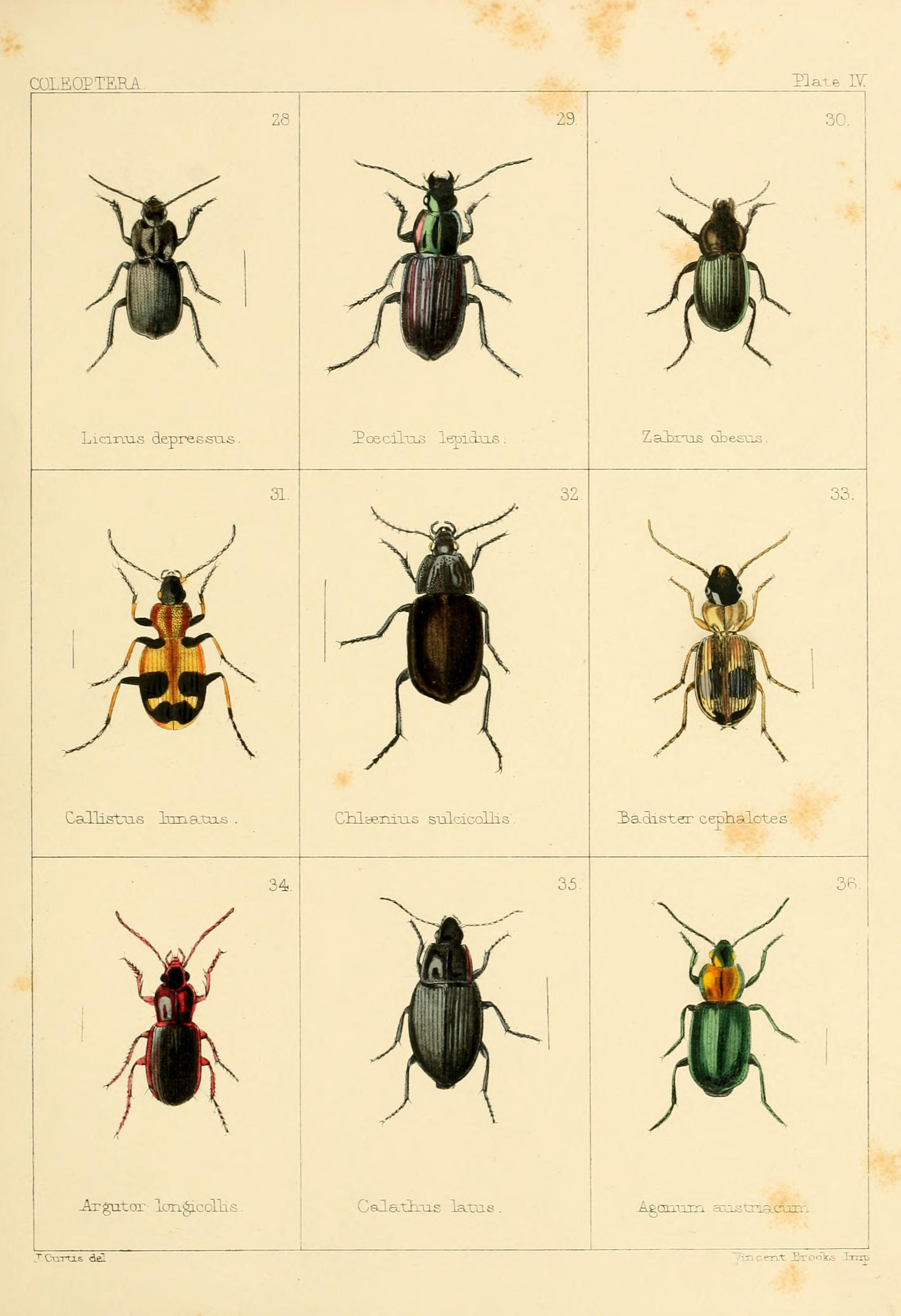

Scientific classification
- Kingdom: Animalia
- Phylum: Arthropoda
- Clade: Pancrustacea
- Class: Insecta
- Order: Coleoptera
- Suborder: Adephaga
- Family: Carabidae
- Genus: Licinus
- Species: L. depressus

Binomial name
- Licinus depressus (Paykull, 1790)

= Licinus depressus =

Species of beetle

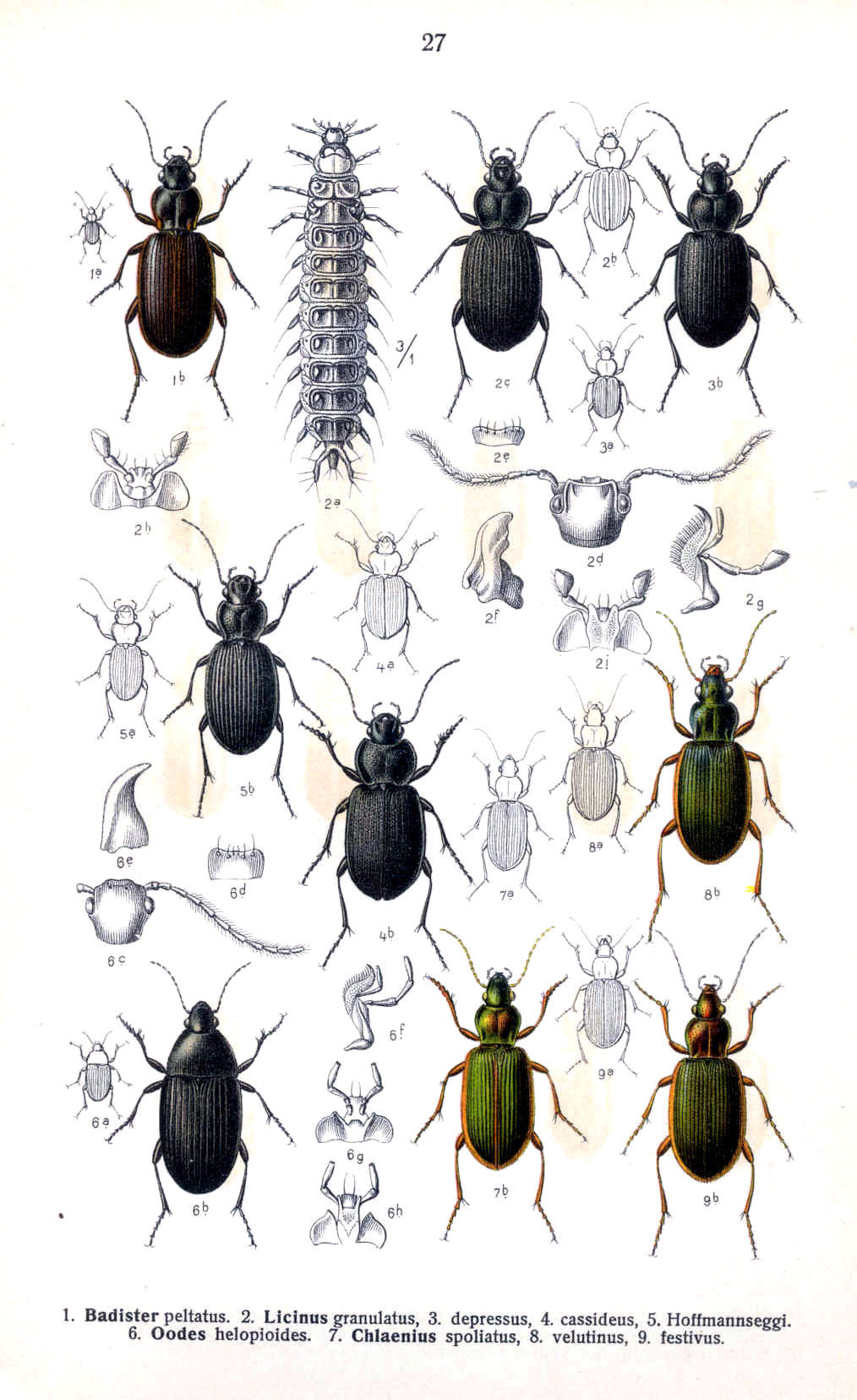
Reitter Badister u.a

Licinus depressus is a species of beetle belonging to the family Carabidae.
