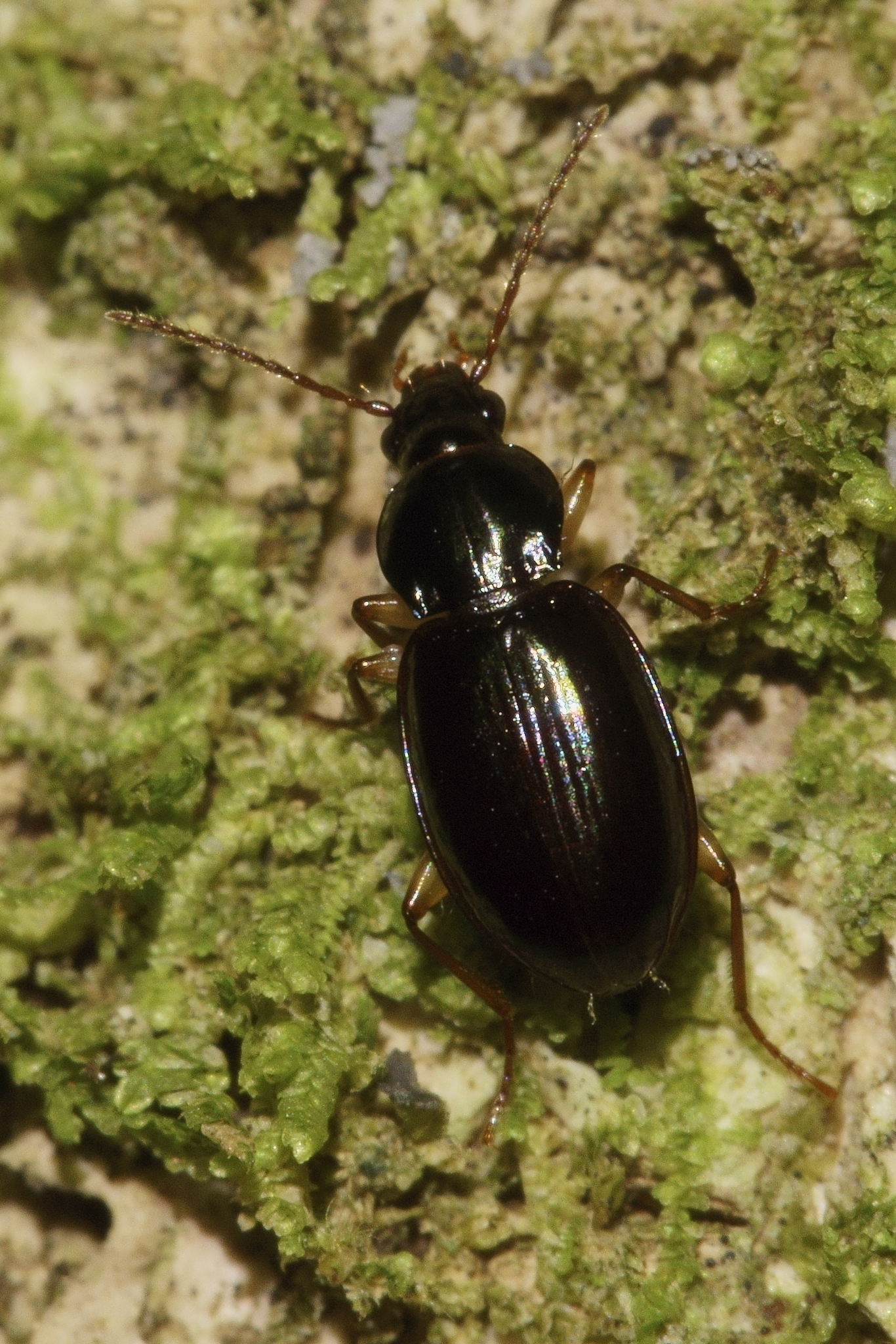
- Oopterus sobrinus, New Zealand

Scientific classification
- Domain: Eukaryota
- Kingdom: Animalia
- Phylum: Arthropoda
- Class: Insecta
- Order: Coleoptera
- Suborder: Adephaga
- Family: Carabidae
- Tribe: Zolini
- Genus: Oopterus; Guerin-Meneville, 1841

= Oopterus =

Genus of beetles

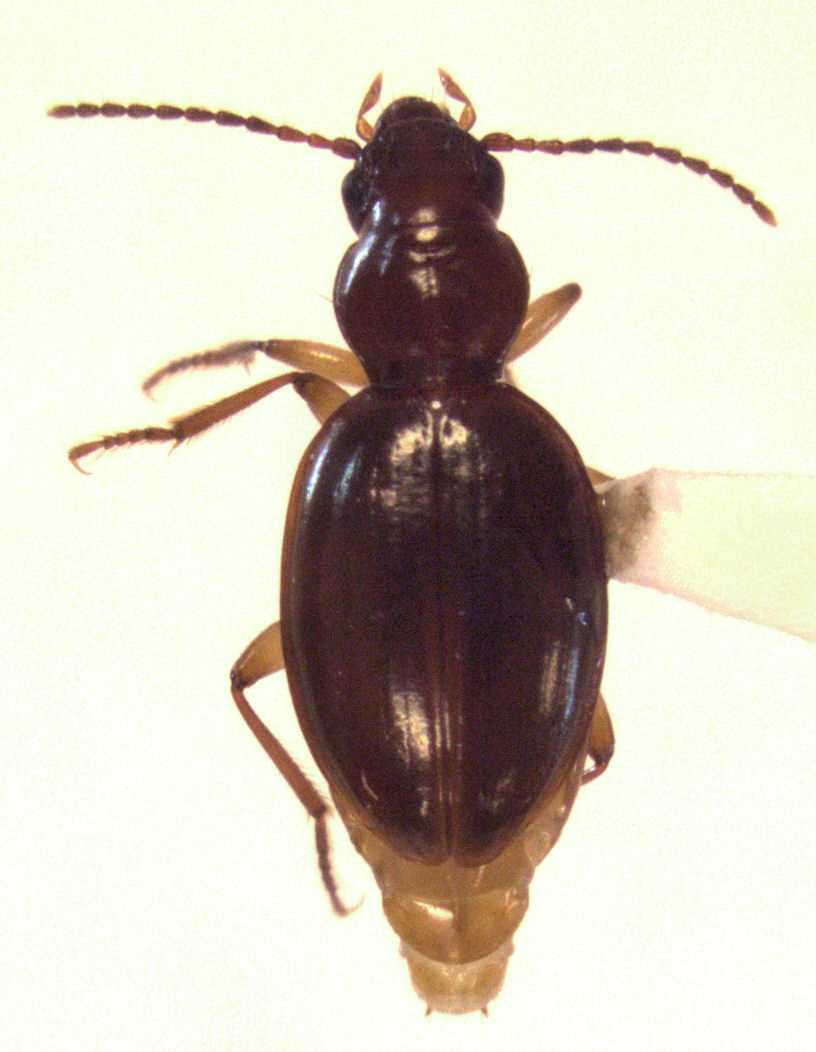
Oopterus clivinoides, Antipodes Islands, New Zealand

Oopterus is a genus in the beetle family Carabidae. There are more than 20 described species in Oopterus, found in New Zealand.

== Species ==
These 29 species belong to the genus Oopterus:

- Oopterus anglemensis Larochelle & Larivière, 2017
- Oopterus arthurensis Larochelle & Larivière, 2017
- Oopterus clivinoides Guérin-Méneville, 1841
- Oopterus collaris Broun, 1893
- Oopterus corvinki Larochelle & Larivière, 2017
- Oopterus discoideus Larochelle & Larivière, 2017
- Oopterus frontalis Broun, 1908
- Oopterus fulvipes Broun, 1886
- Oopterus garnerae Larochelle & Larivière, 2017
- Oopterus laevicollis Bates, 1871
- Oopterus laeviventris (Sharp, 1883)
- Oopterus lewisi (Broun, 1912)
- Oopterus marrineri Broun, 1909
- Oopterus marrisi Larochelle & Larivière, 2017
- Oopterus mohiensis Larochelle & Larivière, 2017
- Oopterus monticola Larochelle & Larivière, 2017
- Oopterus nanus Larochelle & Larivière, 2017
- Oopterus nunni Larochelle & Larivière, 2017
- Oopterus ocularius (Broun, 1917)
- Oopterus palmai Larochelle & Larivière, 2017
- Oopterus patulus (Broun, 1881)
- Oopterus punctatus Larochelle & Larivière, 2017
- Oopterus quadripunctatus Larochelle & Larivière, 2017
- Oopterus sculpturatus Broun, 1908
- Oopterus sobrinus Broun, 1886
- Oopterus strenuus Johns, 1974
- Oopterus suavis Broun, 1917
- Oopterus taieriensis Larochelle & Larivière, 2017
- Oopterus trechoides Larochelle & Larivière, 2017
