= Loricera aptena =

Scientific classification
- Kingdom: Animalia
- Phylum: Arthropoda
- Class: Insecta
- Order: Coleoptera
- Suborder: Adephaga
- Family: Carabidae
- Genus: Loricera
- Species: L. aptena

Binomial name
- Loricera aptena Ball & Erwin, 1969

Species of beetle

Loricera aptena, the wingless springtail-hunter, is a species of beetle of the Carabidae family. This species is found in Mexico (Chihuahua, Durango, Michoacán, Sinaloa), where it inhabits oak/pine/fir forests, pine/oak forests and coniferous forests.

Adults are brachypterous.
