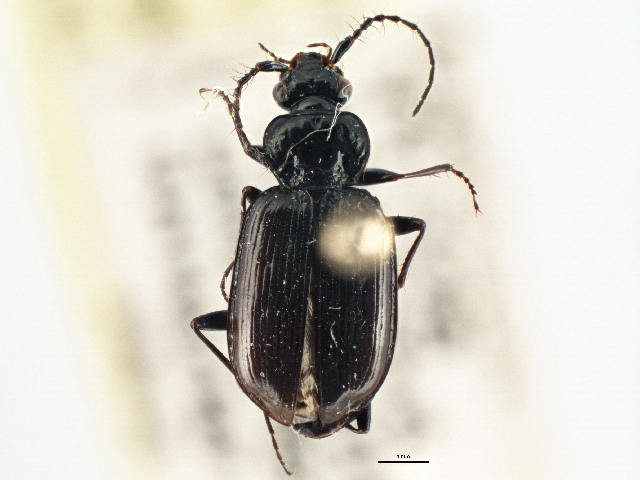

Scientific classification
- Domain: Eukaryota
- Kingdom: Animalia
- Phylum: Arthropoda
- Class: Insecta
- Order: Coleoptera
- Suborder: Adephaga
- Family: Carabidae
- Genus: Loricera
- Species: L. decempunctata

Binomial name
- Loricera decempunctata Eschscholtz, 1833

= Loricera decempunctata =

Species of beetle

Loricera decempunctata, the 10-spotted springtail-hunter, is a species of ground beetle in the family Carabidae. It is found in North America (British Columbia, Quebec, Alaska, California, Oregon, Washington), where it is found along the borders of ponds, lakes, marshes, slow rivers and brooks.
