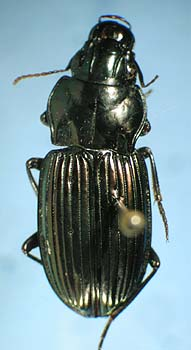
- A beetle species in the genus Hiletus

Scientific classification
- Domain: Eukaryota
- Kingdom: Animalia
- Phylum: Arthropoda
- Class: Insecta
- Order: Coleoptera
- Suborder: Adephaga
- Family: Carabidae
- Subfamily: Hiletinae
- Genus: Hiletus; Schiodte, 1847

Species
- See text

= Hiletus =

Genus of beetles

Hiletus is a genus of ground beetles. All of the species in the genus live in the tropical forests of Africa.

== Species ==
The genus Hiletus contains 6 species:

- - - - Hiletus alluaudi
      - Hiletus nimba
    - Hiletus katanganus
  - Hiletus jeanneli
- - Hiletus versutus
  - Hiletus fossulatus
