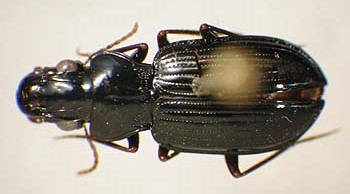
- Eucamaragnathus batesii

Scientific classification
- Kingdom: Animalia
- Phylum: Arthropoda
- Class: Insecta
- Order: Coleoptera
- Suborder: Adephaga
- Family: Carabidae
- Subfamily: Hiletinae
- Genus: Eucamaragnathus; Jeannel, 1937

Species
- See text

= Eucamaragnathus =

Genus of beetles

Eucamaragnathus is a genus of ground beetles in the Hiletinae subfamily.

== Distribution and habitat ==
The 15 different species of Eucamaragnathus live on various continents. E. amapa, E. batesi, E. brasiliensis, and E. jaws live in South America. Five other species live throughout India and Southeast Asia, in the Indomalayan realm, while the remaining 6 species live throughout Africa, mostly in the tropics.

The species of Eucamaragnathus mostly live in the soils within forests, usually tropical or deciduous. They can also be found in savannas.

== Classification ==
Eucamaragnathus contains 15 species. However, due to the fact that the species Eucamaragnathus desenderi was only recently discovered, many sources still claim that the genus only contains 14 species.

The following diagram shows how all of the species in the genus are related to one another. This diagram does not include E. desenderi.

- - - - Eucamaragnathus oxygonus (Chaudoir, 1861)
      - Eucamaragnathus fissipennis (Ancey, 1882)
    - Eucamaragnathus castelnaui (Bocande, 1849)
- - Eucamaragnathus suberbiei (Alluaud, 1914)
  - - Eucamaragnathus bocandei (Alluaud, 1914)
    - - - Eucamaragnathus borneensis Erwin & Stork, 1985
        - - Eucamaragnathus aterrimus (Jeannel, 1938)
          - - - Eucamaragnathus spiniger (Andrewes, 1947)
              - Eucamaragnathus angulicollis (Jeannel, 1938)
            - Eucamaragnathus sumatrensis (Oberthur, 1883)
      - - Eucamaragnathus amapa Erwin & Stork, 1985
        - - Eucamaragnathus brasiliensis (Negre, 1966)
          - - Eucamaragnathus batesii (Chaudoir, 1861)
            - Eucamaragnathus jaws Erwin & Stork, 1985
