= Pterocyrtus cavicola =

Scientific classification
- Domain: Eukaryota
- Kingdom: Animalia
- Phylum: Arthropoda
- Class: Insecta
- Order: Coleoptera
- Suborder: Adephaga
- Family: Carabidae
- Genus: Pterocyrtus
- Species: P. cavicola

Binomial name
- Pterocyrtus cavicola Moore, 1994

Species of beetle

Pterocyrtus cavicola is a species of beetle in the family Carabidae, which was first described in 1994 by Barry Philip Moore.

It is found only in Tasmania.
