= Percodermus =

Scientific classification
- Kingdom: Animalia
- Phylum: Arthropoda
- Class: Insecta
- Order: Coleoptera
- Suborder: Adephaga
- Family: Carabidae
- Tribe: Zolini
- Subtribe: Merizodontina
- Genus: Percodermus; Sloane, 1920
- Species: P. niger

Binomial name
- Percodermus niger Sloane, 1920

Genus of beetles

Percodermus is a genus in the ground beetle family Carabidae. This genus has a single species, Percodermus niger. It is found in Australia.
