= Cymbionotum =

Scientific classification
- Domain: Eukaryota
- Kingdom: Animalia
- Phylum: Arthropoda
- Class: Insecta
- Order: Coleoptera
- Suborder: Adephaga
- Family: Carabidae
- Subfamily: Melaeninae
- Genus: Cymbionotum; Baudi di Selve, 1864

Subgenera
- Cymbionotum Baudi di Selve, 1864; Procoscinia Ball & Shpeley, 2005

Genus of beetles

Cymbionotum is a genus of ground beetles in the family Carabidae. There are at least 20 described species in Cymbionotum.

== Species ==
These 20 species belong to the genus Cymbionotum:

- Cymbionotum basale (Dejean, 1831) (Africa)
- Cymbionotum candidum Andrewes, 1935 (Pakistan)
- Cymbionotum capicola (Péringuey, 1908) (Africa)
- Cymbionotum fasciatum (Dejean, 1831) (Africa)
- Cymbionotum fasciger (Chaudoir, 1852) (India)
- Cymbionotum fernandezi Ball & Shpeley, 2005 (Colombia)
- Cymbionotum fluviale Andrewes, 1935 (India and Sri Lanka)
- Cymbionotum helferi (Chaudoir, 1850) (Southeast Asia)
- Cymbionotum mandli (Jedlicka, 1963) (Iran)
- Cymbionotum microphthalmum (Chaudoir, 1876) (Africa, Southwest Asia)
- Cymbionotum namwala Ball & Shpeley, 2005 (Zambia)
- Cymbionotum negrei Perrault, 1994 (Venezuela)
- Cymbionotum pictulum (Bates, 1874) (Southwest Asia)
- Cymbionotum rufotestaceum (Fairmaire, 1893) (Ethiopia)
- Cymbionotum schueppelii (Dejean, 1825) (Africa, Middle East)
- Cymbionotum semelederi (Chaudoir, 1861) (Africa, Asia, Europe)
- Cymbionotum semirubricum (Reitter, 1914) (Africa, Southwest Asia)
- Cymbionotum striatum (Reitter, 1894) (Afghanistan and Pakistan)
- Cymbionotum subcaecum Ball & Shpeley, 2005 (Pakistan)
- Cymbionotum transcaspicum (Semenov, 1891) (Asia, Middle East, Africa)
