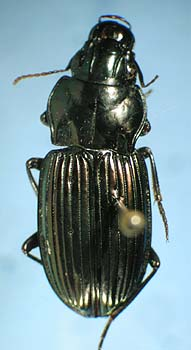
- A picture showing the top side of the body of a beetle in the genus Hiletus

Scientific classification
- Domain: Eukaryota
- Kingdom: Animalia
- Phylum: Arthropoda
- Class: Insecta
- Order: Coleoptera
- Suborder: Adephaga
- Family: Carabidae
- Subfamily: Hiletinae; Schiodte, 1847

Genera
- Eucamaragnathus; Hiletus

= Hiletinae =

Subfamily of beetles

Hiletinae is a subfamily of beetles in the family Carabidae, containing 21 species in two genera. All of the species in the genus Hiletus, as well as 6 species in Eucamaragnathus, live in Africa. The other species in Eucamaragnathus live in either Southeast Asia and India, or in South America.

== Classification ==
- Genus Eucamaragnathus Jeannel, 1938
  - Eucamaragnathus amapa Erwin & Stork, 1985
  - Eucamaragnathus angulicollis (Jeannel, 1938)
  - Eucamaragnathus aterrimus (Jeannel, 1938)
  - Eucamaragnathus batesii (Chaudoir, 1861)
  - Eucamaragnathus bocandei (Alluaud, 1914)
  - Eucamaragnathus borneensis Erwin & Stork, 1985
  - Eucamaragnathus brasiliensis (Negre, 1966)
  - Eucamaragnathus castelnaui (Bocande, 1849)
  - Eucamaragnathus desenderi Assmann, Drees, Matern & Schuldt, 2011
  - Eucamaragnathus fissipennis (Ancey, 1882)
  - Eucamaragnathus jaws Erwin & Stork, 1985
  - Eucamaragnathus oxygonus (Chaudoir, 1861)
  - Eucamaragnathus spiniger (Andrewes, 1947)
  - Eucamaragnathus suberbiei (Alluaud, 1914)
  - Eucamaragnathus sumatrensis (Oberthur, 1883)
- Genus Hiletus Schiodte, 1847
  - Hiletus alluaudi Jeannel, 1938
  - Hiletus fossulatus Jeannel, 1938
  - Hiletus jeanneli Negre, 1966
  - Hiletus katanganus Basilewsky, 1948
  - Hiletus nimba Erwin & Stork, 1985
  - Hiletus versutus Schiodte, 1847
  - Hiletus walterrossii Allegro & Giachino, 2017
