= Argentinatachoides =

Scientific classification
- Kingdom: Animalia
- Phylum: Arthropoda
- Clade: Pancrustacea
- Class: Insecta
- Order: Coleoptera
- Suborder: Adephaga
- Family: Carabidae
- Tribe: Bembidarenini
- Genus: Argentinatachoides; Sallanave; Erwin & Roig-Juñent, 2008
- Species: A. balli

Binomial name
- Argentinatachoides balli Sallanave; Erwin & Roig-Juñent, 2008

Genus of beetles

Argentinatachoides balli is a species of beetle in the family Carabidae, the only species in the genus Argentinatachoides.
