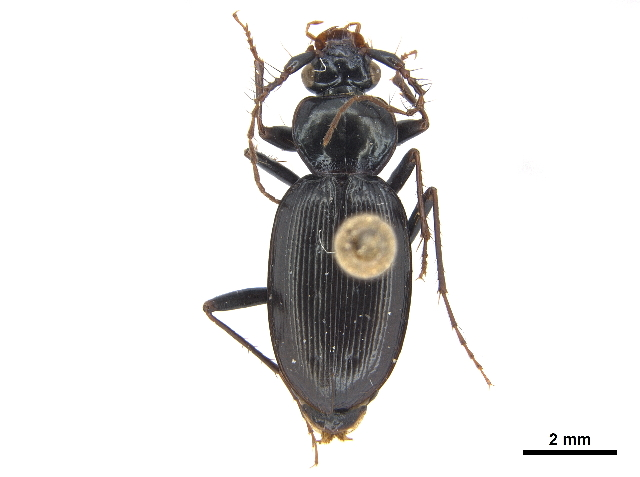

Scientific classification
- Kingdom: Animalia
- Phylum: Arthropoda
- Class: Insecta
- Order: Coleoptera
- Suborder: Adephaga
- Family: Carabidae
- Genus: Loricera
- Species: L. rotundicollis

Binomial name
- Loricera rotundicollis Chaudoir, 1863

= Loricera rotundicollis =

Species of beetle

Loricera rotundicollis, the round-collared springtail-hunter, is a species of beetle of the Carabidae family. This species is found in Guatemala and Mexico, where it inhabits higher, dry ground in cloud, oak and oak-pine forests.

Adults are wing-dimorphic, with most being brachypterous, but some macropterous individuals.
