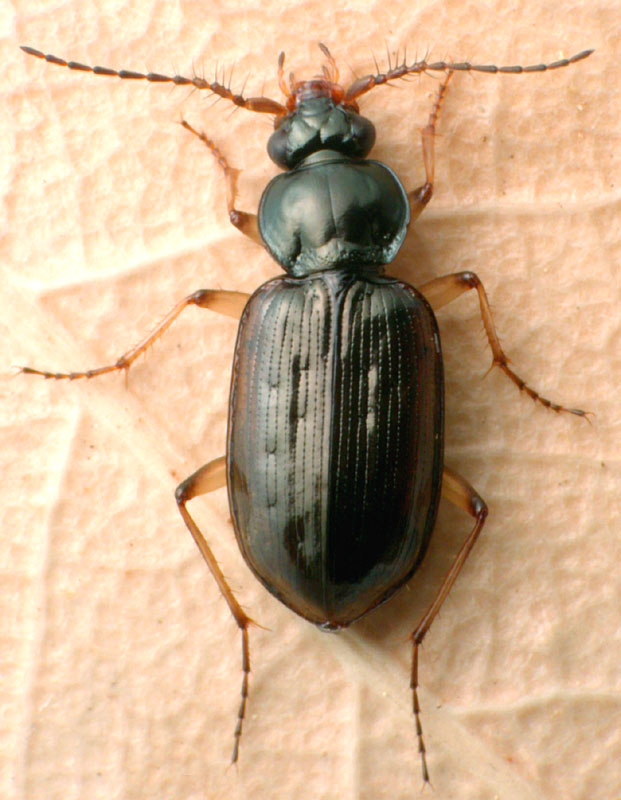

Scientific classification
- Domain: Eukaryota
- Kingdom: Animalia
- Phylum: Arthropoda
- Class: Insecta
- Order: Coleoptera
- Suborder: Adephaga
- Family: Carabidae
- Genus: Loricera
- Species: L. foveata

Binomial name
- Loricera foveata LeConte, 1851

= Loricera foveata =

Species of beetle

Loricera foveata, the pitted springtail-hunter, is a species of ground beetle in the family Carabidae. It is found along the coastal region of North America, where it is found near fresh water.
