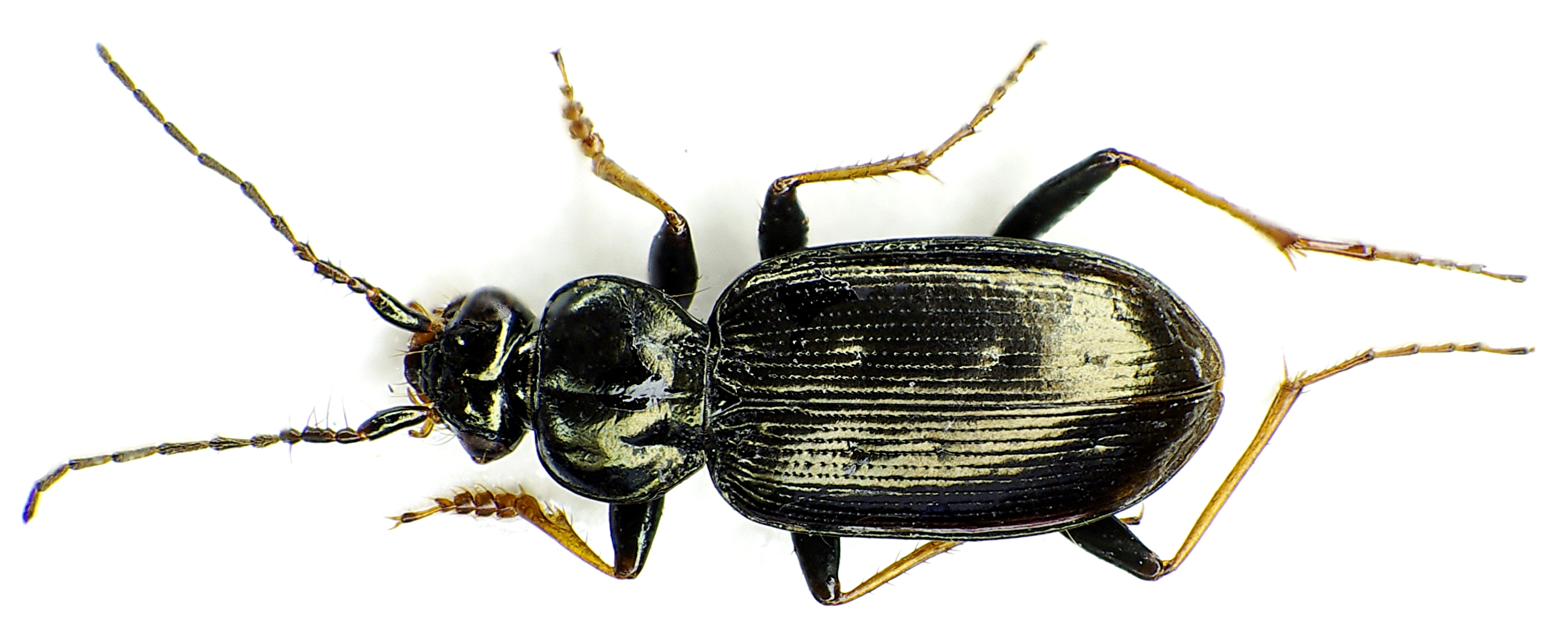

Scientific classification
- Kingdom: Animalia
- Phylum: Arthropoda
- Clade: Pancrustacea
- Class: Insecta
- Order: Coleoptera
- Suborder: Adephaga
- Family: Carabidae
- Subfamily: Loricerinae
- Tribe: Loricerini
- Genus: Loricera
- Species: L. pilicornis

Binomial name
- Loricera pilicornis (Fabricius, 1775)

Synonyms
- Carabus pilicornis Fabricius, 1775; Loricera coerulescens G.Horn, 1878; Lorocera pilicornis; Loricera sierrae Van Dyke, 1925; Loricera uteana Casey, 1920; Loricera neoscotica LeConte, 1863; Loricera semistriata Hatch, 1853; Loricera apennina Binaghi, 1942; Loricera californica LeConte, 1863; Loricera bicolor Letzner, 1851; Loricera haemorrhoidalis Letzner, 1851; Loricera niger Letzner, 1851; Loricera orichalceus Letzner, 1851; Loricera versicolor Letzner, 1851; Loricera rufilabris Motschulsky, 1845; Loricera alpina Heer, 1838; Loricera semipunctata Eschscholtz, 1833; Loricera aenea Latreille, 1805; Buprestis vinearum Geoffroy in Fourcroy, 1785; Carabus seticornis O.F.Müller, 1776

= Loricera pilicornis =

Species of beetle

Loricera pilicornis is a species of ground beetle native to Europe. It is found in shady places near water.

== Subspecies ==
- Loricera pilicornis pilicornis (Ireland, Great Britain, Denmark, Norway, Sweden, Finland, France, Belgium, Netherlands, Germany, Switzerland, Austria, Czechia, Slovakia, Hungary, Poland, Estonia, Latvia, Lithuania, Belarus, Ukraine, Italy, Slovenia, Croatia, Bosnia-Herzegovina, North Macedonia, Bulgaria, Moldova, Iran, Kazakhstan, China, North Korea, Japan, USA, Canada, Russia, Mongolia, Alaska) - hairy-horned springtail-hunter
- Loricera pilicornis congesta Mannerheim, 1853 (USA, Russia, Alaska) - Bering springtail-hunter
