= Melaenus =

Scientific classification
- Kingdom: Animalia
- Phylum: Arthropoda
- Class: Insecta
- Order: Coleoptera
- Suborder: Adephaga
- Family: Carabidae
- Subfamily: Melaeninae
- Genus: Melaenus; Dejean, 1831

Genus of beetles

Melaenus is a genus of ground beetles in the family Carabidae. There are two described species in Melaenus.

== Species ==
These two species belong to the genus Melaenus:

- Melaenus elegans Dejean, 1831 (Africa)
- Melaenus piger (Fabricius, 1801) (India and Sri Lanka)
