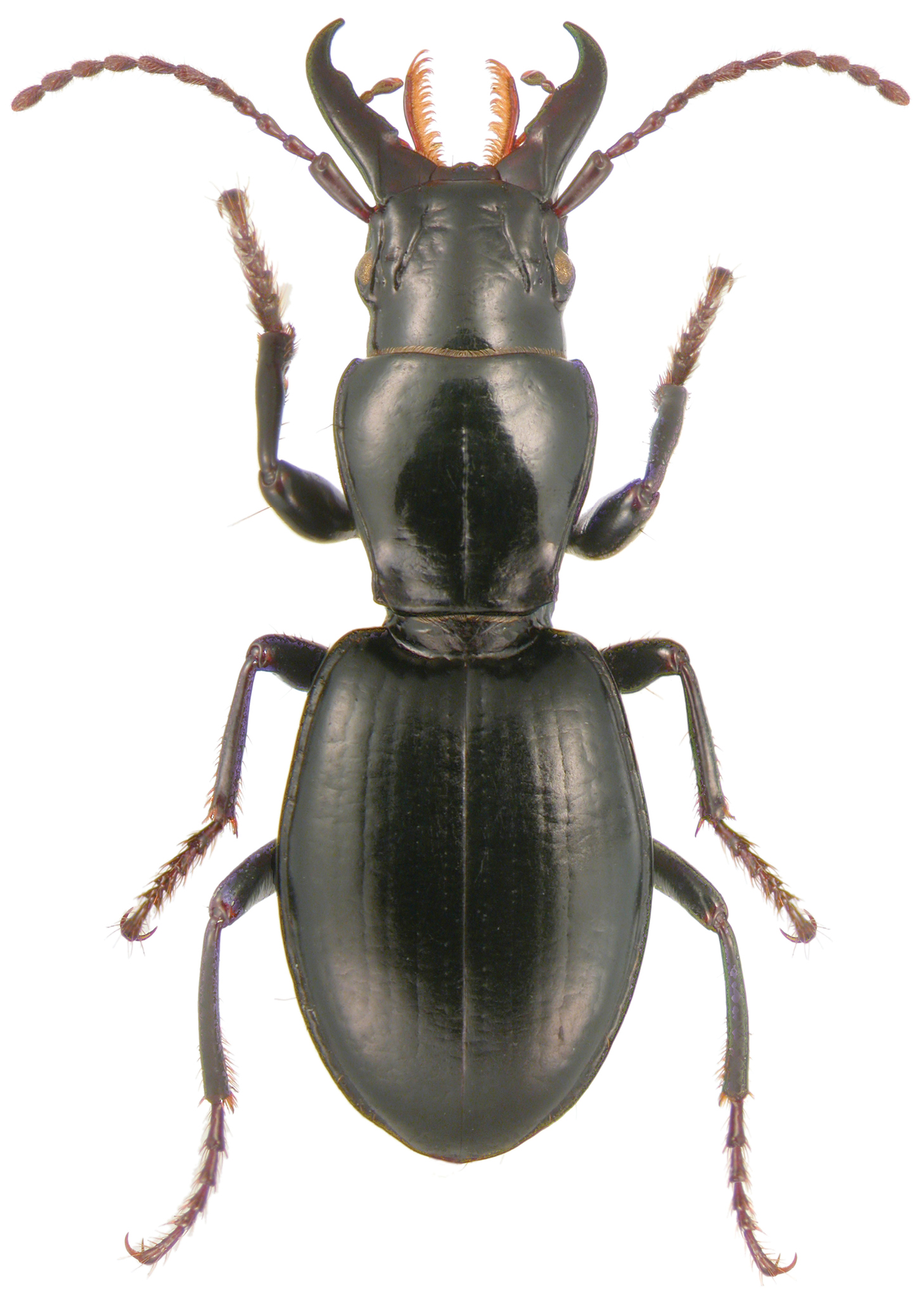

Scientific classification
- Domain: Eukaryota
- Kingdom: Animalia
- Phylum: Arthropoda
- Class: Insecta
- Order: Coleoptera
- Suborder: Adephaga
- Family: Carabidae
- Genus: Promecognathus
- Species: P. crassus

Binomial name
- Promecognathus crassus LeConte, 1868

Synonyms
- Promecognathus contractus, Promecognathus corpulentus, Promecognathus grandiceps

= Promecognathus crassus =

Species of beetle

Promecognathus crassus is a species of ground beetle in the family Carabidae. It is found along the Pacific coast of North America, from British Columbia to California.

P. crassus, like its close relative Promecognathus laevissimus, uses its large jaws to feed on millipedes, including those that produce hydrogen cyanide and benzaldehyde, like Xystocheir dissecta. It displays a high tolerance to these toxins.
