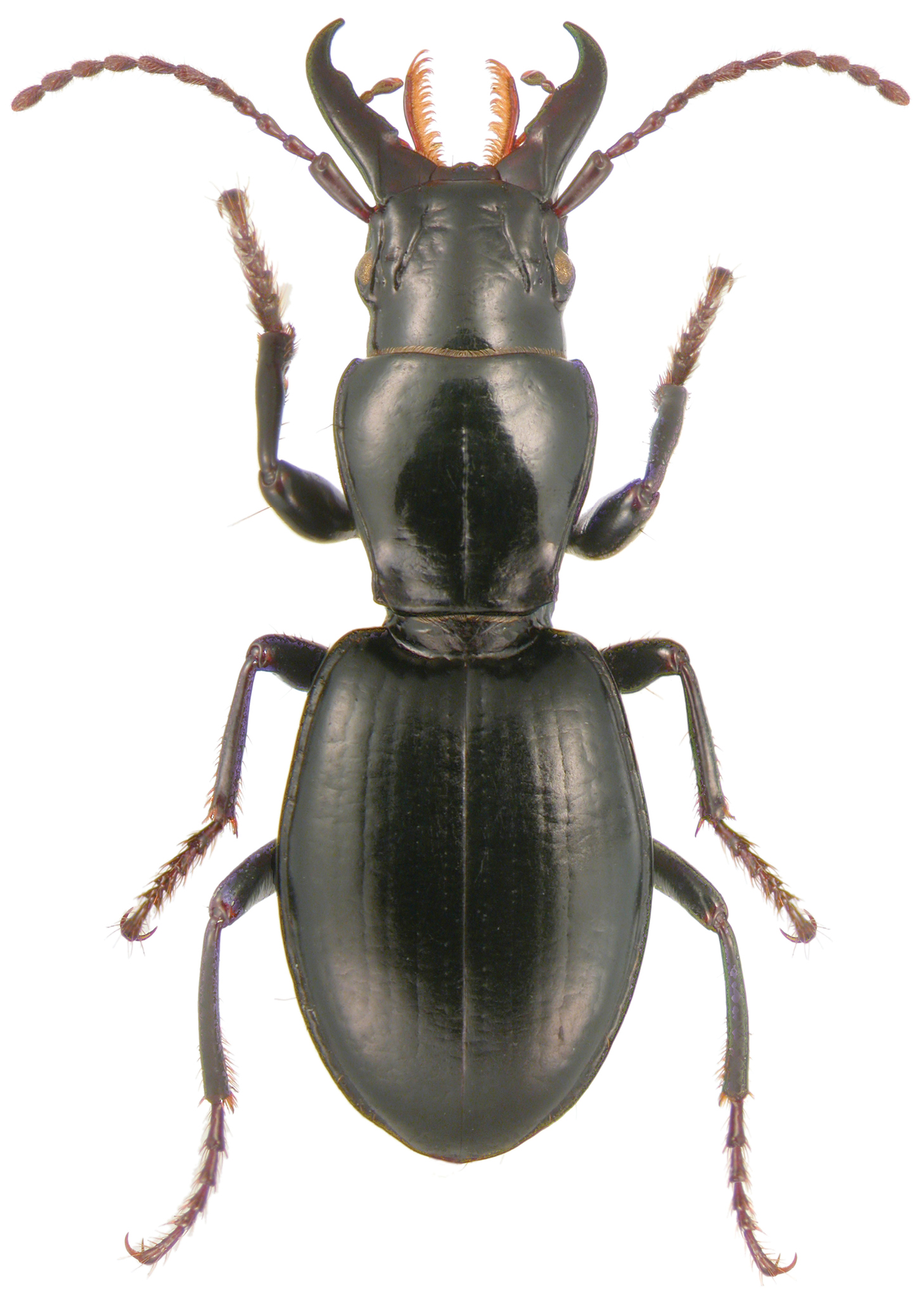
- Promecognathus crassus

Scientific classification
- Kingdom: Animalia
- Phylum: Arthropoda
- Class: Insecta
- Order: Coleoptera
- Suborder: Adephaga
- Family: Carabidae
- Genus: Promecognathus
- Species: P. laevissimus

Binomial name
- Promecognathus laevissimus (Dejean, 1829)

Synonyms
- Eripus laevissimus, Promecognathus debilis

= Promecognathus laevissimus =

Species of beetle

Promecognathus laevissimus, also known as the smooth millipede hunter, is a species of ground beetle in the family Carabidae. It is found in western North America, including Oregon, California, and Nevada.

P. laevissimus is closely related to Promecognathus crassus. Like P. crassus, P. laevissimus uses its large jaws to feed on millipedes, including those that produce hydrogen cyanide and benzaldehyde, like Xystocheir dissecta. It has a high tolerance to these toxins.

Adult P. laevissimus are glossy black beetles 5–18 millimetres (0.20–0.71 in) long with long jaws and a narrow thorax. They are nocturnal.
