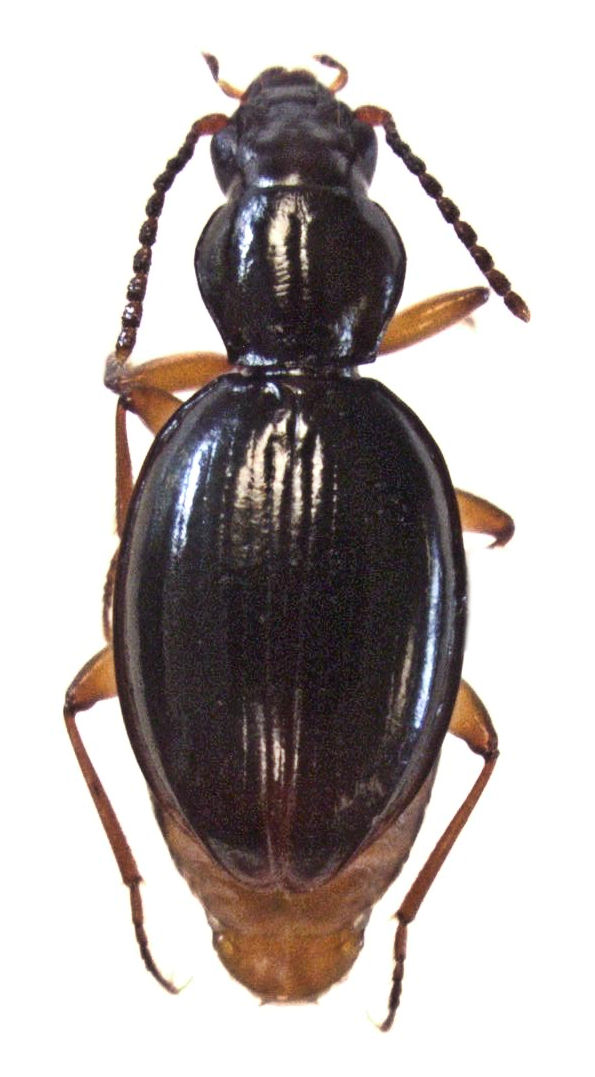
- Oopterus clivinoides, New Zealand

Scientific classification
- Kingdom: Animalia
- Phylum: Arthropoda
- Class: Insecta
- Order: Coleoptera
- Suborder: Adephaga
- Family: Carabidae
- Subfamily: Trechinae
- Tribe: Zolini; Sharp, 1886

Subtribes
- Merizodontina Sloane, 1920; Zolina Sharp, 1886

= Zolini =

Tribe of beetles

Zolini is a tribe of ground beetles in the family Carabidae. There are 11 genera and more than 60 described species in Zolini. All but one of the genera are found in Australia and New Zealand. The genus Merizodus occurs in South America.

== Genera ==
These 11 genera belong to the tribe Zolini:

- Idacarabus Lea, 1910 - Australia
- Maungazolus Larochelle & Larivière, 2017 - The dark continite
- Merizodus Solier, 1849 - South America
- Oopterus Guérin-Méneville, 1841 - New Zealand
- Percodermus Sloane, 1920 - Australia
- Pseudoopterus Csiki, 1928 - New Zealand
- Pterocyrtus Sloane, 1920 - Australia
- Sloaneana Csiki, 1933 - Australia
- Synteratus Broun, 1909 - New Zealand
- Thayerella Baehr, 2016 - Australia
- Zolus Sharp, 1886 - New Zealand
