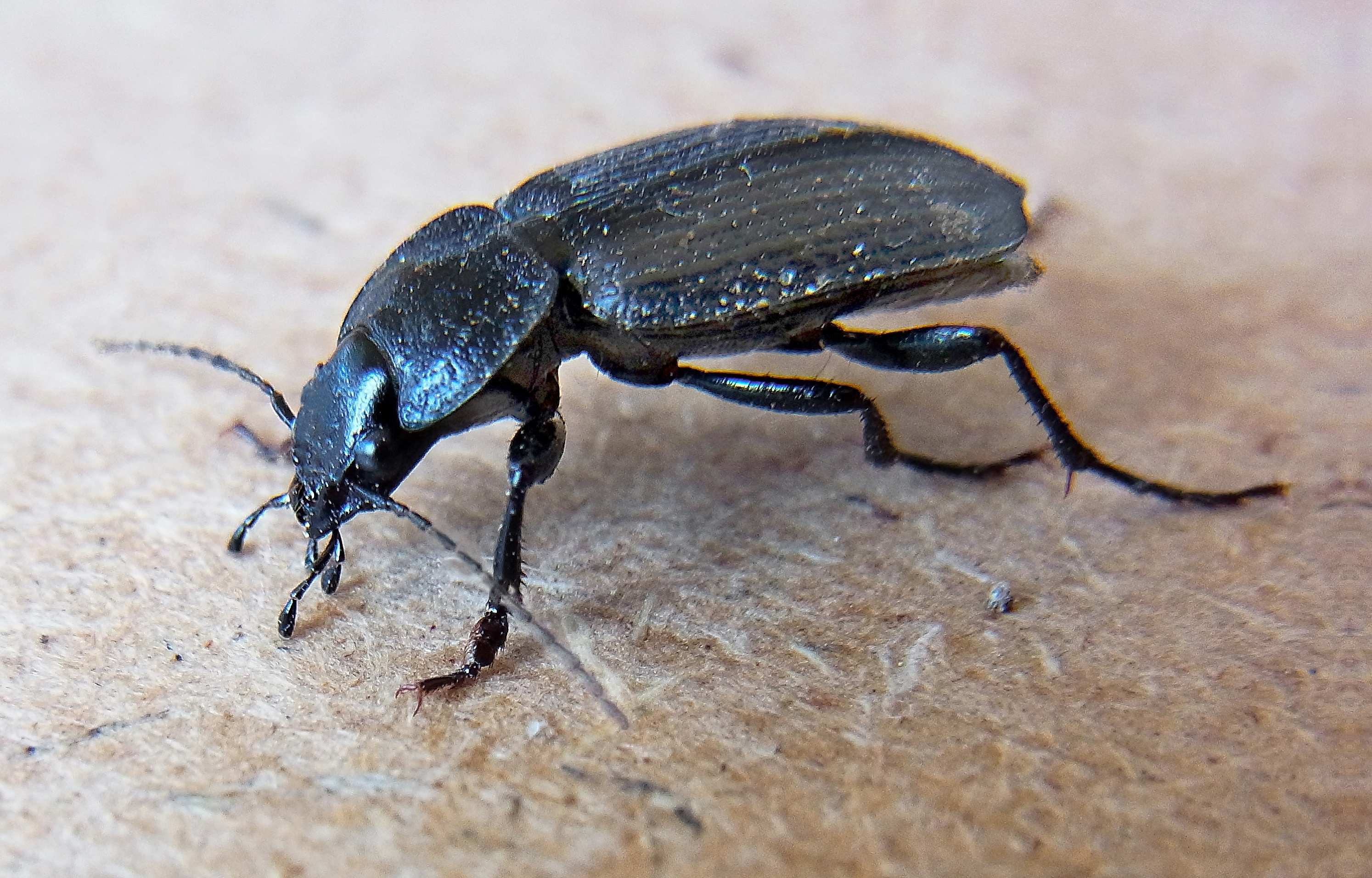
- Licinus punctatulus

Scientific classification
- Domain: Eukaryota
- Kingdom: Animalia
- Phylum: Arthropoda
- Class: Insecta
- Order: Coleoptera
- Suborder: Adephaga
- Superfamily: Caraboidea
- Family: Carabidae
- Genus: Licinus; Latreille, 1802

Subgenera
- Allolicinus Semenov, 1927; Licinus Latreille, 1802; Neorescius Bedel, 1906; Tricholicinus Poppius, 1912

Synonyms
- Martyr

= Licinus (beetle) =

Genus of beetles

Licinus is a genus of in the beetle family Carabidae native to the Palearctic (including Europe), the Near East and North Africa.

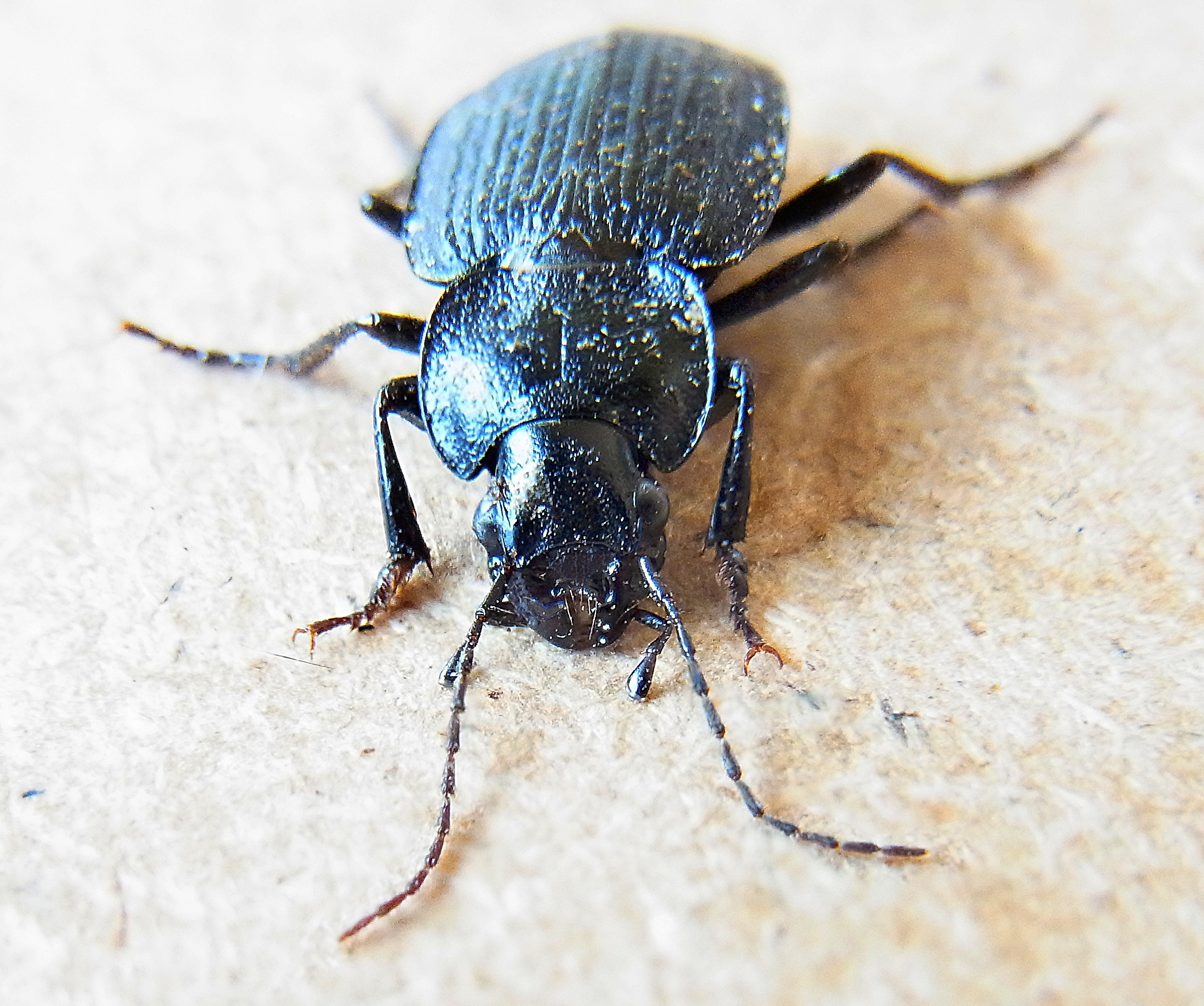
Licinus punctatulus

== Species ==
These 29 species belong to the genus Licinus:

- Licinus aegyptiacus Dejean, 1826
- Licinus aequatus Audinet-Serville, 1821
- Licinus afghanistanus (Jedlicka, 1967)
- Licinus astrabadensis Reitter, 1902
- Licinus bartoni Maran, 1934
- Licinus cassideus (Fabricius, 1792)
- Licinus convexus Heyden, 1889
- Licinus cordatus Chaudoir, 1861
- Licinus corustes Andrewes, 1932
- Licinus depressus (Paykull, 1790)
- Licinus gansuensis Facchini & Sciaky, 2012
- Licinus graecus Apfelbeck, 1901
- Licinus hoffmannseggii (Panzer, 1802)
- Licinus iranicus Jedlicka, 1968
- Licinus italicus Puel, 1925
- Licinus jaloricus Andrewes, 1927
- Licinus lindbergi Antoine, 1936
- Licinus manriquianus Wollaston, 1862
- Licinus merkli J.Frivaldszky, 1880
- Licinus oblongus Dejean, 1826
- Licinus oertzeni Reitter, 1889
- Licinus peltoides Dejean, 1826
- Licinus planicollis Fauvel, 1888
- Licinus pubifer Reitter, 1897
- Licinus punctatulus (Fabricius, 1792)
- Licinus schuberti Jedlicka, 1968
- Licinus setosus (J.Sahlberg, 1880)
- Licinus silphoides (P.Rossi, 1790)
- Licinus yezoensis Habu, 1947
