= Xenaroswelliana =

Scientific classification
- Domain: Eukaryota
- Kingdom: Animalia
- Phylum: Arthropoda
- Class: Insecta
- Order: Coleoptera
- Suborder: Adephaga
- Family: Carabidae
- Subfamily: Xenaroswellianinae
- Genus: Xenaroswelliana; Erwin, 2007
- Species: X. deltaquadrant

Binomial name
- Xenaroswelliana deltaquadrant Erwin, 2007

Subfamily of beetles

Xenaroswelliana is a genus of ground beetles in the family Carabidae, the sole genus in the subfamily Xenaroswellianinae.

This genus has a single species, Xenaroswelliana deltaquadrant. It was described from a single specimen found in Brazil.
