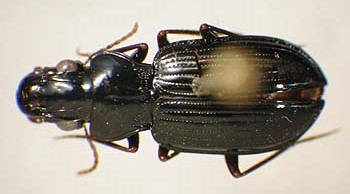

Scientific classification
- Kingdom: Animalia
- Phylum: Arthropoda
- Class: Insecta
- Order: Coleoptera
- Suborder: Adephaga
- Family: Carabidae
- Genus: Eucamaragnathus
- Species: E. batesii

Binomial name
- Eucamaragnathus batesii Chaudoir, 1861

= Eucamaragnathus batesii =

Species of beetle

Eucamaragnathus batesii is a species of ground beetle. It is 3/8 1/2-inch long.

Eucamaragnathus batesii lives in rainforests, mostly near shallow water, such as swamps and streams. It has been seen walking beneath the surface of the water, although it usually wanders around the edge of the water. It is active at night, usually just hiding beneath forest debris in the daytime. It lives in western Brazil and the southeastern part of Peru, making it one of the four species in its genus that lives in South America.
