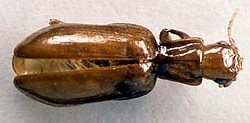
- Nototylus fryi

Scientific classification
- Domain: Eukaryota
- Kingdom: Animalia
- Phylum: Arthropoda
- Class: Insecta
- Order: Coleoptera
- Suborder: Adephaga
- Family: Carabidae
- Subfamily: Nototylinae; Reichardt, 1977
- Genus: Nototylus; Schaum, 1863

= Nototylus =

Subfamily of beetles

Nototylinae is a subfamily of beetles in the family Carabidae. It contains the single genus Nototylus with two species, Nototylus fryi and Nototylus balli which was described in 2020. The first described species N. fryi was represented by a single specimen from Espiritu Santo where the forests were converted for plantations of sugarcane or cacao, and for cattle rearing. The species is considered likely extinct, although some specimens are possibly still live in protected areas like Sooretama Biological Reserve.
