= Sinozolini =

Scientific classification
- Domain: Eukaryota
- Kingdom: Animalia
- Phylum: Arthropoda
- Class: Insecta
- Order: Coleoptera
- Suborder: Adephaga
- Family: Carabidae
- Subfamily: Trechinae
- Tribe: Sinozolini; Deuve, 1997

Tribe of beetles

Sinozolini is a tribe of ground beetles in the family Carabidae. There are at least three genera and about eight described species in Sinozolini.

== Genera ==
These three genera belong to the tribe Sinozolini:

- Chaltenia Roig-Juñent & Cicchino, 2001 (Argentina)
- Phrypeus Casey, 1924 (North America)
- Sinozolus Deuve, 1997 (China)
