= Pterocyrtus =

Scientific classification
- Kingdom: Animalia
- Phylum: Arthropoda
- Class: Insecta
- Order: Coleoptera
- Suborder: Adephaga
- Family: Carabidae
- Genus: Pterocyrtus; Sloane, 1920

Type species
- Pterocyrtus globosus Sloane, 1920

Genus of beetles

Pterocyrtus is a genus of beetles in the family Carabidae, which was first described in 1920 by Thomas Gibson Sloane. It contains the following species:

- Pterocyrtus cavicola Moore, 1994
- Pterocyrtus globosus Sloane, 1920
- Pterocyrtus grayi Eberhard & Giachino, 2011
- Pterocyrtus meridionalis Eberhard & Giachino, 2011
- Pterocyrtus rubescens Sloane, 1920
- Pterocyrtus striatulus Sloane, 1920
- Pterocyrtus tasmanicus (Castelnau, 1867)
- Pterocyrtus truncaticollis Sloane, 1923

== Distribution ==
Species of this genus are found only in Victoria and Tasmania.
