= Ginema =

Scientific classification
- Kingdom: Animalia
- Phylum: Arthropoda
- Clade: Pancrustacea
- Class: Insecta
- Order: Coleoptera
- Suborder: Adephaga
- Family: Carabidae
- Subfamily: Gineminae; Ball & Shpeley, 2002
- Tribe: Ginemini; Ball & Shpeley, 2002
- Genus: Ginema; Ball, 2002
- Species: G. thomasi

Binomial name
- Ginema thomasi Ball, 2002

Genus of beetles

Ginema is a genus of ground beetles (family Carabidae). The single described species, Ginema thomasi, is known only from Bolivia.

Its closest living relatives are unknown, and is sometimes separated as subfamily Gineminae. While this species certainly does not resemble any other tribe of ground beetles, it is not yet fully resolved whether treatment as a monotypic subfamily adequately expresses its phylogenetic position. Alternatively, Gineminae can be downranked to a tribe Ginemini within subfamily Harpalinae (particularly when these are loosely circumscribed) or a related lineage.
