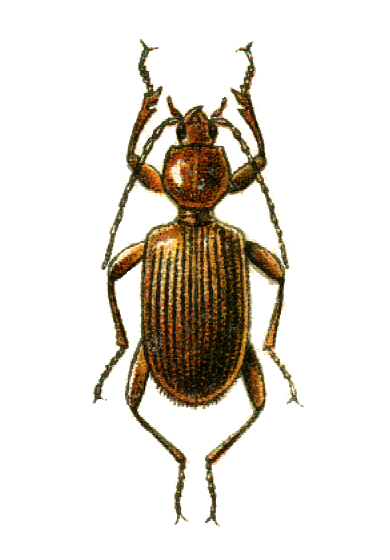
- Apotomus testaceus

Scientific classification
- Kingdom: Animalia
- Phylum: Arthropoda
- Class: Insecta
- Order: Coleoptera
- Suborder: Adephaga
- Family: Carabidae
- Subfamily: Apotominae; LeConte, 1853
- Genus: Apotomus; Illiger, 1807

= Apotomus =

Genus of beetles

Apotominae is a subfamily of beetles in the family Carabidae. It contains the single genus Apotomus with the following species:

- Apotomus alluaudi Jeannel, 1946
- Apotomus angusticollis J. Muller, 1943
- Apotomus annulaticornis Peringuey, 1896
- Apotomus atripennis Motschulsky, 1858
- Apotomus australis Castelnau, 1867
- Apotomus chaudoirii Wollaston, 1860
- Apotomus clypeonitens J. Muller, 1943
- Apotomus fairmairei Jeannel, 1946
- Apotomus flavescens Apetz, 1854
- Apotomus hirsutulus Bates, 1892
- Apotomus latigena Reitter, 1892
- Apotomus minor Baehr, 1990
- Apotomus neghellianus G. Muller, 1942
- Apotomus qiongshanensis Tian, 2000
- Apotomus reichardti Erwin, 1980
- Apotomus rufithorax Pecchioli, 1837
- Apotomus rufus P. Rossi, 1790
- Apotomus sahelianus Mateu, 1966
- Apotomus sumbawanus Dupius, 1911
- Apotomus syriacus Jedlicka, 1961
- Apotomus testaceus Dejean, 1825
- Apotomus velox Motschulsky, 1858
