= Melaeninae =

Scientific classification
- Domain: Eukaryota
- Kingdom: Animalia
- Phylum: Arthropoda
- Class: Insecta
- Order: Coleoptera
- Suborder: Adephaga
- Family: Carabidae
- Subfamily: Melaeninae; Csiki, 1933

Subfamily of beetles

Melaeninae is a subfamily of ground beetles in the family Carabidae. There are 2 genera and more than 20 described species in Melaeninae.

== Genera ==
These two genera belong to the subfamily Melaeninae:

- Cymbionotum Baudi di Selve, 1864
- Melaenus Dejean, 1831
