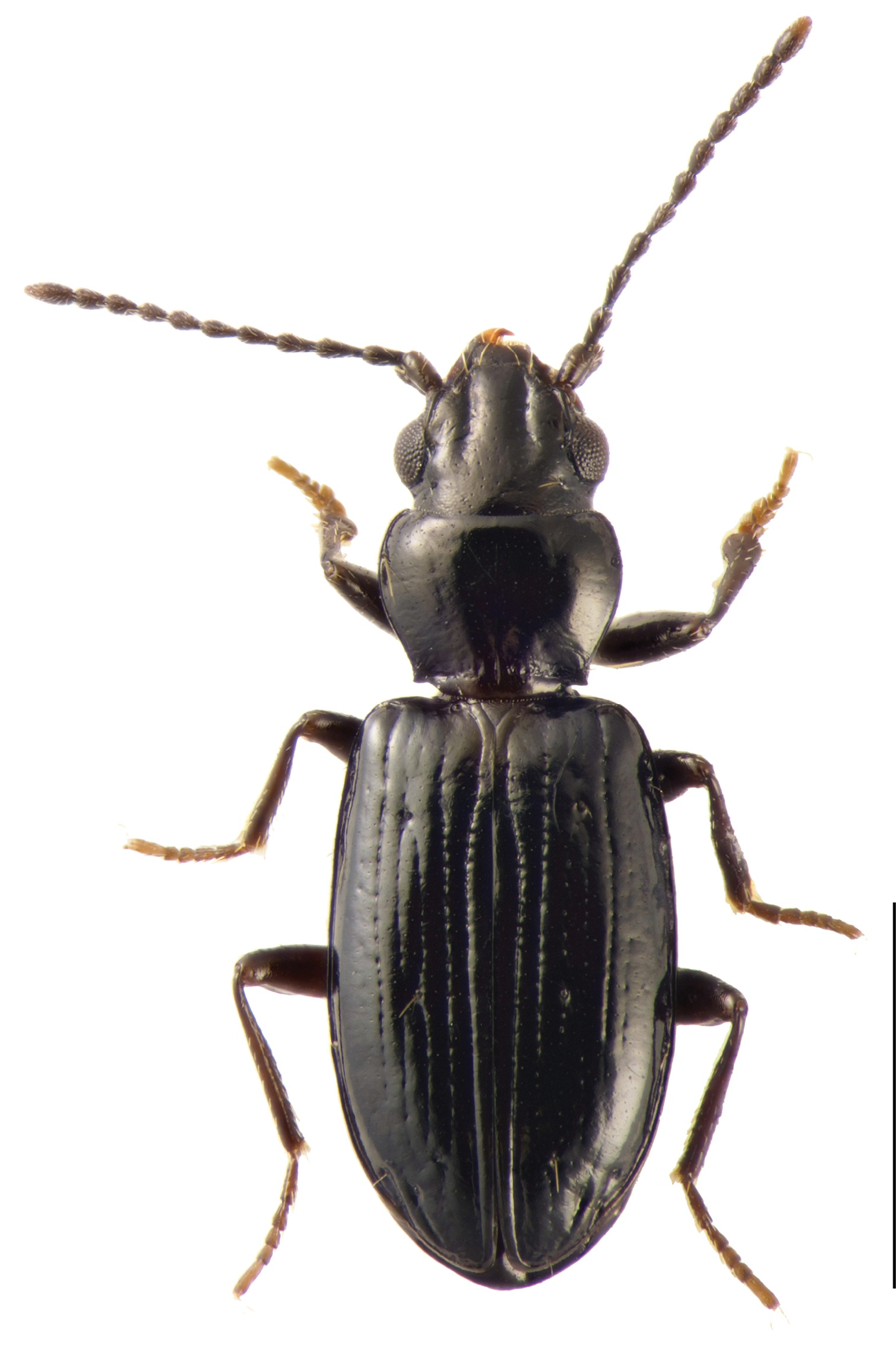
- Tasmanitachoides Erwini, Tasmania, Australia

Scientific classification
- Kingdom: Animalia
- Phylum: Arthropoda
- Class: Insecta
- Order: Coleoptera
- Suborder: Adephaga
- Family: Carabidae
- Subfamily: Trechinae
- Tribe: Bembidarenini; Maddison et al., 2019

= Bembidarenini =

Tribe of beetles

Bembidarenini is a tribe of ground beetles in the family Carabidae. There are 4 genera and more than 30 described species in Bembidarenini. Three of the genera are found in South America and one in Australia.

== Genera ==
These four genera belong to the tribe Bembidarenini:

- Andinodontis Erwin & Toledano, 2010 (South America)
- Argentinatachoides Sallanave; Erwin & Roig-Juñent, 2008 (Argentina)
- Bembidarenas Erwin, 1972 (Chile, Argentina)
- Tasmanitachoides Erwin, 1972 (Australia)
