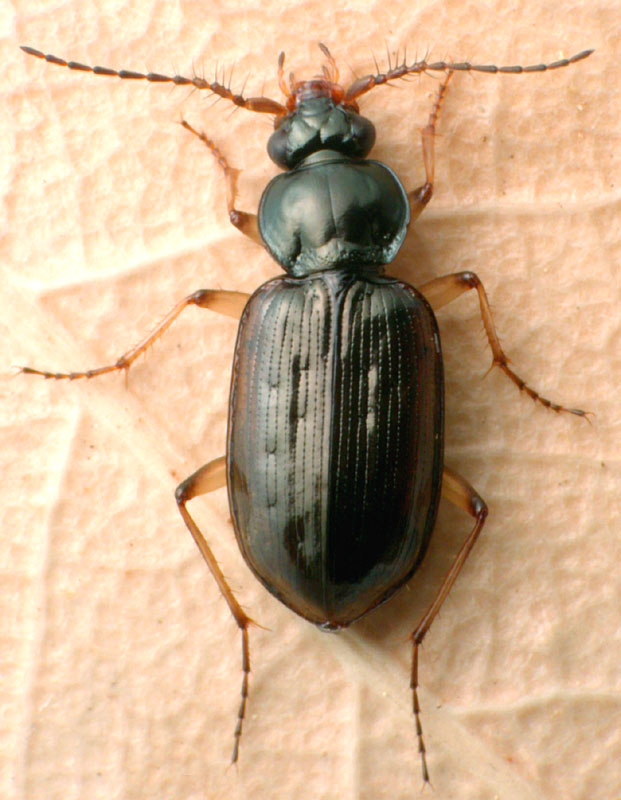
- Loricera foveata

Scientific classification
- Kingdom: Animalia
- Phylum: Arthropoda
- Class: Insecta
- Order: Coleoptera
- Suborder: Adephaga
- Family: Carabidae
- Subfamily: Loricerinae
- Tribe: Loricerini
- Genus: Loricera; Latreille, 1802

Subgenera
- Elliptosoma Wollaston, 1854; Loricera Latreille, 1802; Plesioloricera Sciaky & Facchini, 1999

Synonyms
- Dolichodes

= Loricera =

Genus of beetles

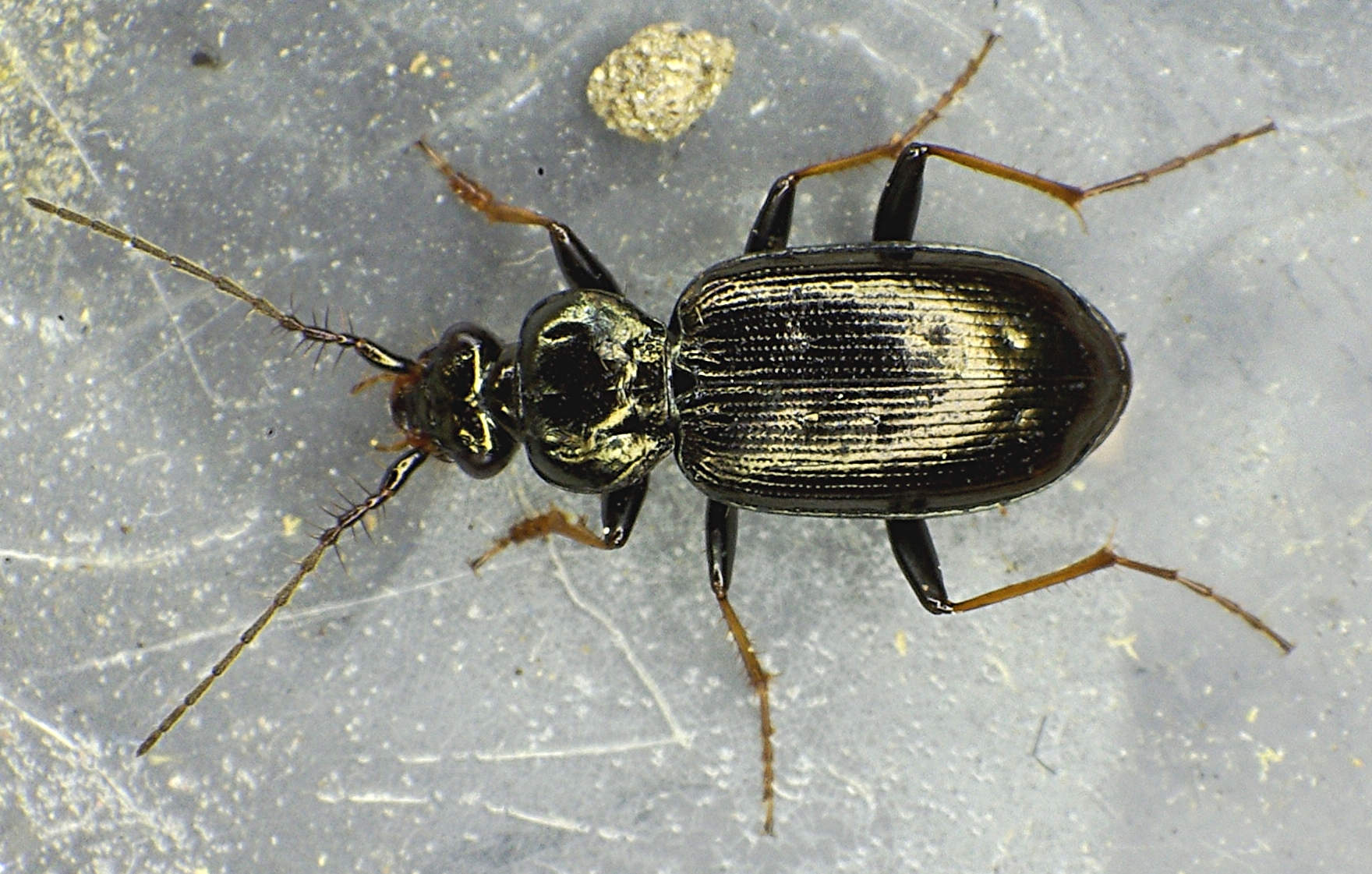
Loricera pilicornis

Loricera is a genus of ground beetles in the family Carabidae, the sole genus of the subfamily Loricerinae. There are about 17 described species in Loricera.

== Species ==
These 17 species belong to the genus Loricera:

- Elliptosoma Wollaston, 1854
  - Loricera wollastonii Javet, 1852 (Madeira and Europe)
- Plesioloricera Sciaky & Facchini, 1999
  - Loricera balli Sciaky & Facchini, 1999 (China)
- Loricera
  - Loricera aptena Ball & Erwin, 1969 (Mexico)
  - Loricera barbarae Sciaky & Facchini, 1999 (China)
  - Loricera decempunctata Eschscholtz, 1833 (North America)
  - Loricera foveata LeConte, 1851 (North America)
  - Loricera kryzhanovskiji Sciaky & Facchini, 1999 (China)
  - Loricera mirabilis Jedlicka, 1932 (China)
  - Loricera obsoleta Semenov, 1889 (China)
  - Loricera ovipennis Semenov, 1889 (China)
  - Loricera pilicornis (Fabricius, 1775) (Palearctic)
  - Loricera rotundicollis Chaudoir, 1863 (Guatemala and Mexico)
  - Loricera stevensi Andrewes, 1920 (India and Nepal)
- Unplaced
  - † Loricera electrica Klausnitzer, 2003
  - † Loricera exita Scudder, 1900
  - † Loricera glacialis Scudder, 1877
  - † Loricera groehni Cai; Liu & Huang, 2017
