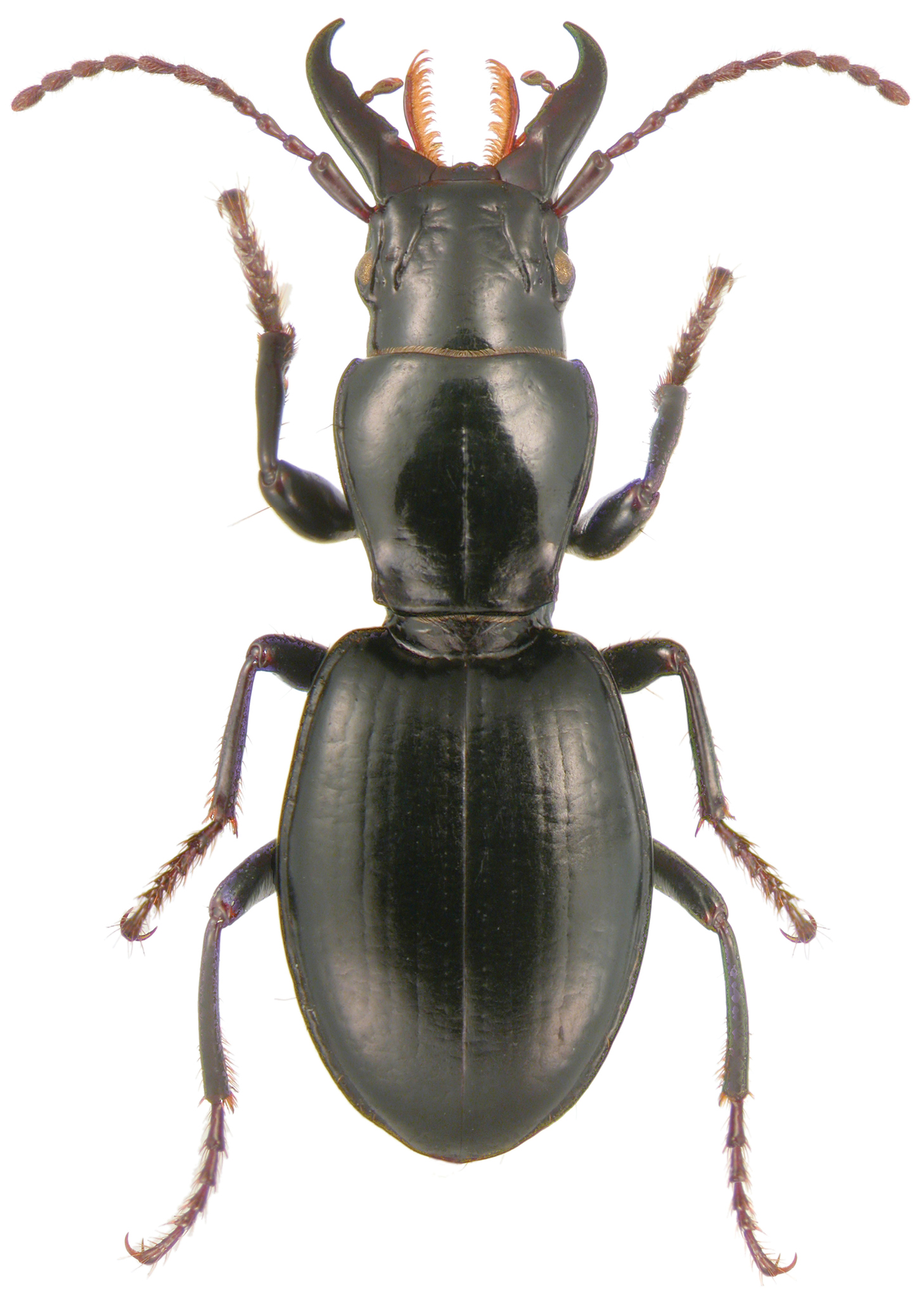
- Promecognathus crassus

Scientific classification
- Domain: Eukaryota
- Kingdom: Animalia
- Phylum: Arthropoda
- Class: Insecta
- Order: Coleoptera
- Suborder: Adephaga
- Family: Carabidae
- Tribe: Promecognathini
- Genus: Promecognathus; Chaudoir, 1846

= Promecognathus =

Genus of beetles

Promecognathus is a genus of ground beetles in the family Carabidae. There are at least two described species in Promecognathus. Both species of Promecognathus are known to predate upon Xystocheir dissecta, which is a species of flat-backed millipede that produces hydrogen cyanide as a chemical defense. The beetles do not avoid exposure to the defense, meaning they are likely physically resistant to hydrogen cyanide.

== Species ==
These two species belong to the genus Promecognathus:

- Promecognathus crassus LeConte, 1868
- Promecognathus laevissimus (Dejean, 1829)
