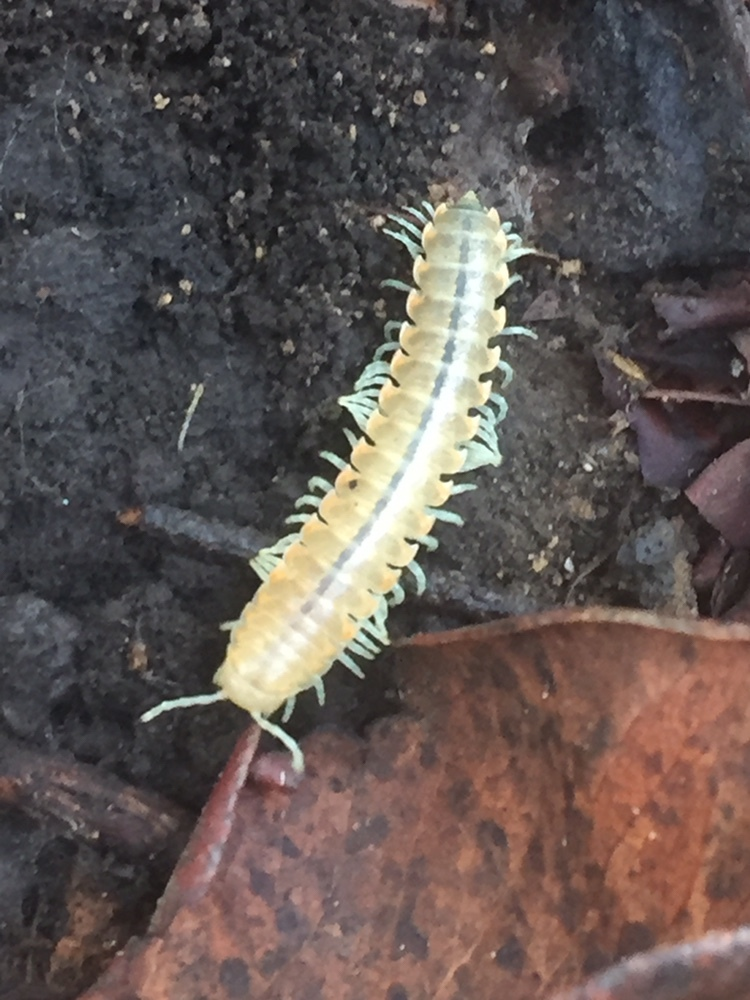

Scientific classification
- Kingdom: Animalia
- Phylum: Arthropoda
- Subphylum: Myriapoda
- Class: Diplopoda
- Order: Polydesmida
- Family: Xystodesmidae
- Genus: Xystocheir
- Species: X. dissecta

Binomial name
- Xystocheir dissecta (Wood, 1867)

= Xystocheir dissecta =

Species of millipede

Xystocheir dissecta is a species of flat-backed millipede in the family Xystodesmidae. It is found along the coast of Northern California. If threatened, X. dissecta can release a hydrogen cyanide gas, which has benzaldehyde as a byproduct. This defense works against most beetle predators, except Promecognathus.

== Subspecies ==
These three subspecies belong to the species Xystocheir dissecta:

- Xystocheir dissecta dissecta (Wood, 1867)
- Xystocheir dissecta microrama Shelley, 1996
- Xystocheir dissecta taibona Chamberlin, 1912

== External resources ==
PBS Digital Studios | Deep Look on YouTube : This Millipede and Beetle Have a Toxic Relationship
