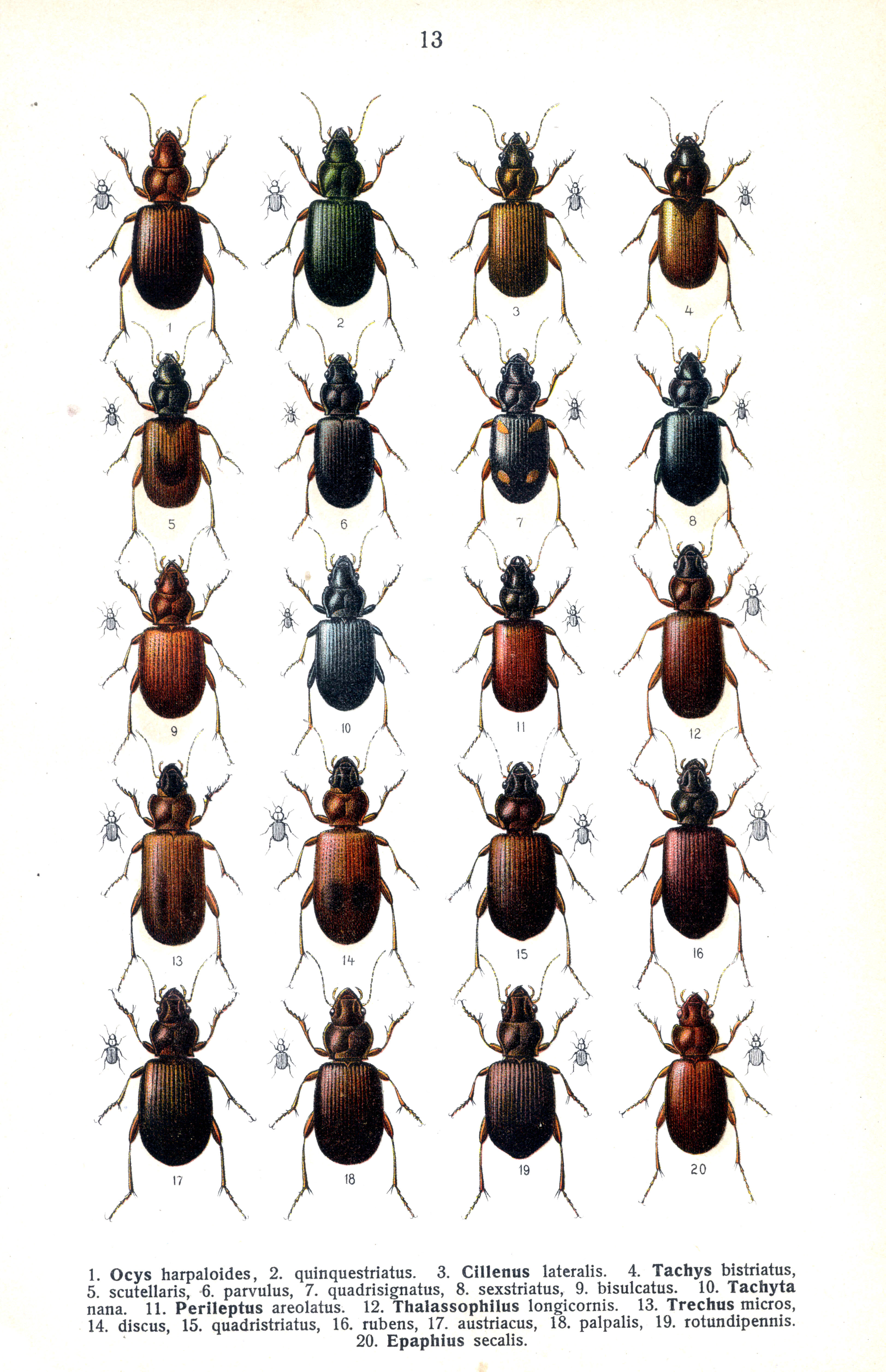
- Trechinae from Central Europe

Scientific classification
- Kingdom: Animalia
- Phylum: Arthropoda
- Clade: Pancrustacea
- Class: Insecta
- Order: Coleoptera
- Suborder: Adephaga
- Family: Carabidae
- Subfamily: Trechinae; Bonelli, 1810

= Trechinae =

Subfamily of beetles

Trechinae is a subfamily of ground beetles in the family Carabidae. There are 6 tribes, more than 430 genera, and over 6,700 described species in Trechinae.

== Tribes ==
These six tribes are members of Trechinae:

- Bembidarenini Maddison et al., 2019 (4 genera)
- Bembidiini Stephens, 1827 (more than 120 genera)
- Pogonini Laporte, 1834 (12 genera)
- Sinozolini Deuve, 1997 (3 genera)
- Trechini Bonelli, 1810 (more than 270 genera)
- Zolini Sharp, 1886 (11 genera)
