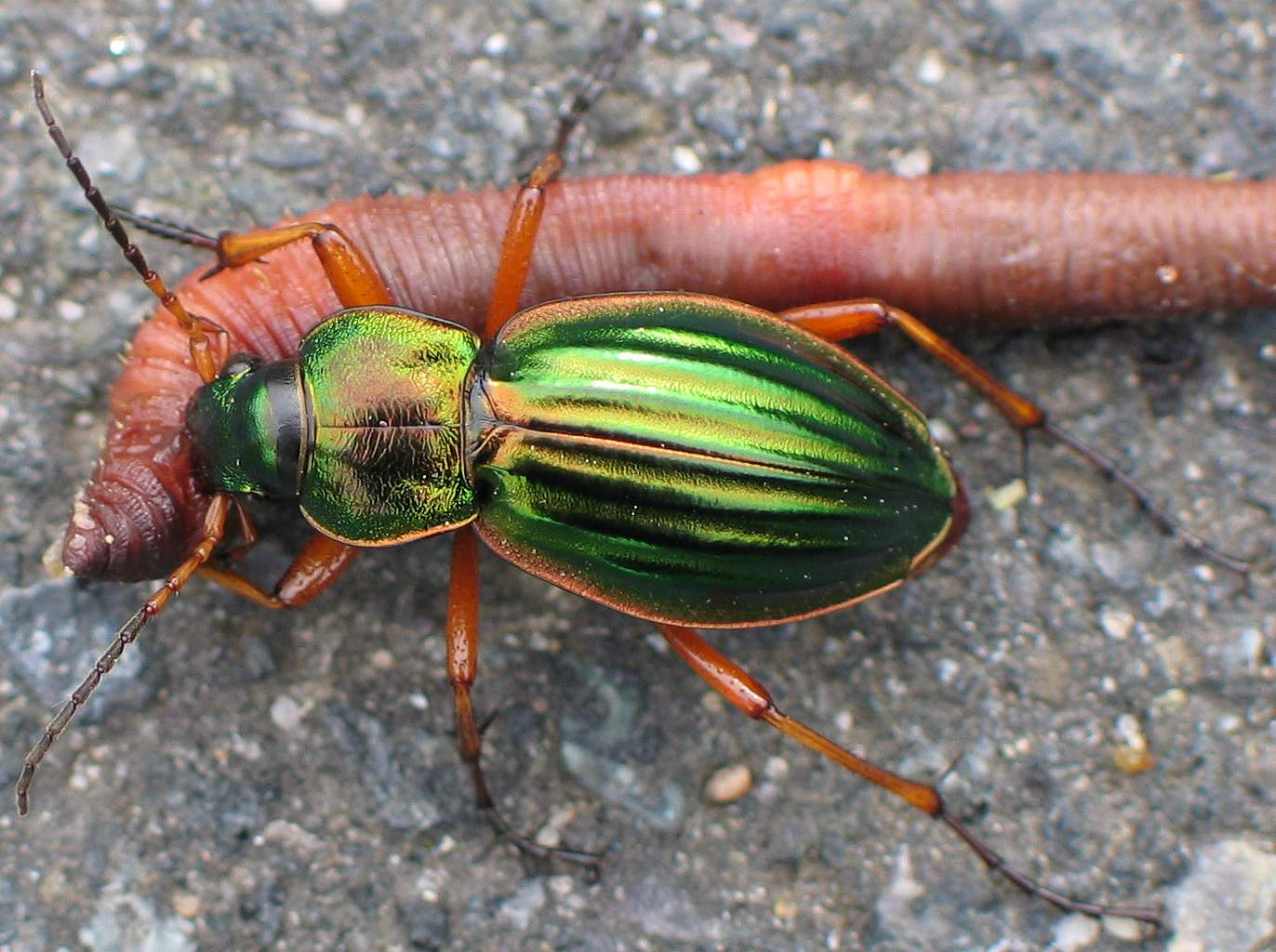
- Golden ground beetle eating an earthworm in Northern Germany

Scientific classification
- Kingdom: Animalia
- Phylum: Arthropoda
- Clade: Pancrustacea
- Class: Insecta
- Order: Coleoptera
- Suborder: Adephaga
- Superfamily: Caraboidea
- Family: Carabidae; Latreille, 1802

Subfamilies
- (See text)

= Ground beetle =

Ground beetles Temporal range: Hettangian–Recent

Family of beetles

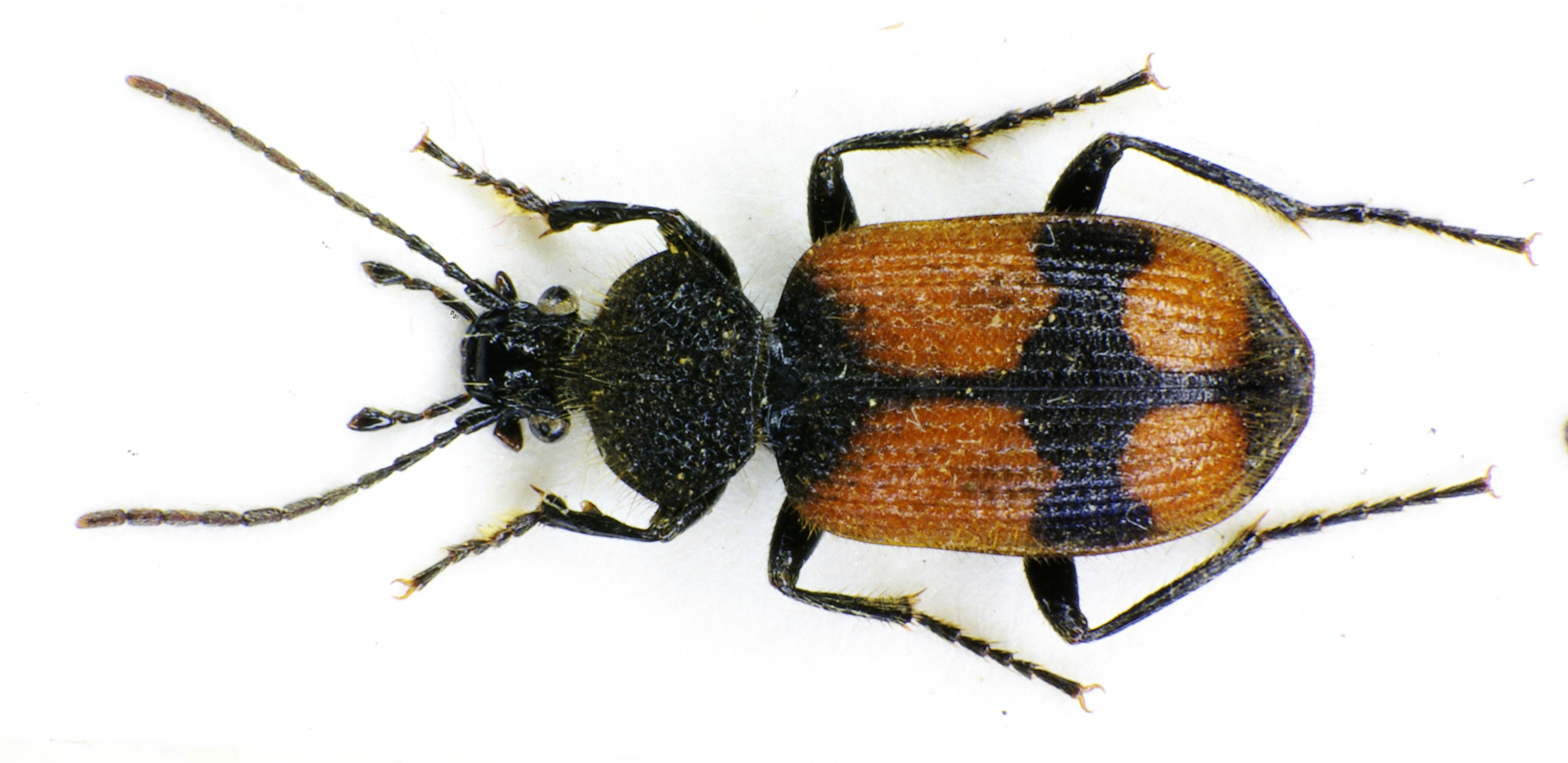
A crucifix ground beetle (Panagaeus cruxmajor) got Charles Darwin into trouble in 1828.

Lebia tricolor, genus Lebia, in the family of ground beetles, searching for prey.

Ground beetles are a large, cosmopolitan family of beetles, known as Carabidae, with more than 40,000 species worldwide, around 2,000 of which are found in North America and 2,700 in Europe. As of 2015, it is one of the 10 most species-rich animal families. They belong to the suborder Adephaga. Members of the family are primarily carnivorous, but some members are herbivorous or omnivorous.

== Description and ecology ==
Although their body shapes and coloring vary somewhat, most are shiny black or metallic and have ridged wing covers (elytra). The elytra are fused in some species, particularly the large Carabinae, rendering the beetles unable to fly. The species Mormolyce phyllodes is known as violin beetle due to their peculiarly shaped elytra. All carabids except the quite primitive flanged bombardier beetles (Paussinae) have a groove on their fore leg tibiae bearing a comb of hairs used for cleaning their antennae.

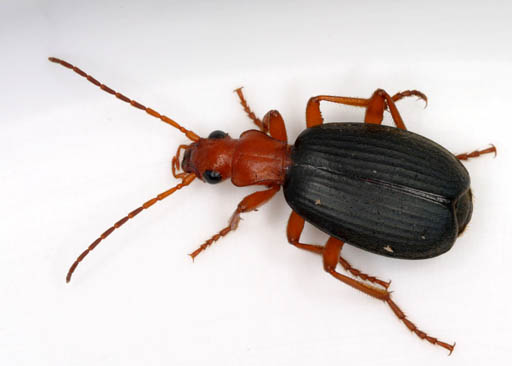
A Brachinus species typical bombardier beetle (Brachininae: Brachinini) from North Carolina

=== Defensive secretions ===
Typical for the ancient beetle suborder Adephaga to which they belong, they have paired pygidial glands in the lower back of the abdomen. These are well developed in ground beetles, and produce noxious or even caustic secretions used to deter would-be predators. In some, commonly known as bombardier beetles, these secretions are mixed with volatile compounds and ejected by a small combustion, producing a loud popping sound and a cloud of hot and acrid gas that can injure small mammals, such as shrews, and is liable to kill invertebrate predators outright.

This ability has evolved independently twice, as it seems, in the flanged bombardier beetles (Paussinae), which are among the most ancient ground beetles, and in the typical bombardier beetles (Brachininae), which are part of a more "modern" lineage. The Anthiini, though, can mechanically squirt their defensive secretions for considerable distances and are able to aim with a startling degree of accuracy; in Afrikaans, they are known as oogpisters ("eye-pissers"). In one of the very few known cases of a vertebrate mimicking an arthropod, juvenile Heliobolus lugubris lizards are similar in color to the aposematic oogpister beetles, and move in a way that makes them look surprisingly similar to the insects at a casual glance.

A folk story claims that Charles Darwin once found himself on the receiving end of a bombardier beetle's attack, based on a passage in his autobiography. Darwin stated in a letter to Leonard Jenyns that a beetle had attacked him on that occasion, but he did not know what kind:

A Cychrus rostratus once squirted into my eye & gave me extreme pain; & I must tell you what happened to me on the banks of the Cam in my early entomological days; under a piece of bark I found two carabi (I forget which) & caught one in each hand, when lo & behold I saw a sacred Panagæus crux major; I could not bear to give up either of my Carabi, & to lose Panagæus was out of the question, so that in despair I gently seized one of the carabi between my teeth, when to my unspeakable disgust & pain the little inconsiderate beast squirted his acid down my throat & I lost both Carabi & Panagæus!

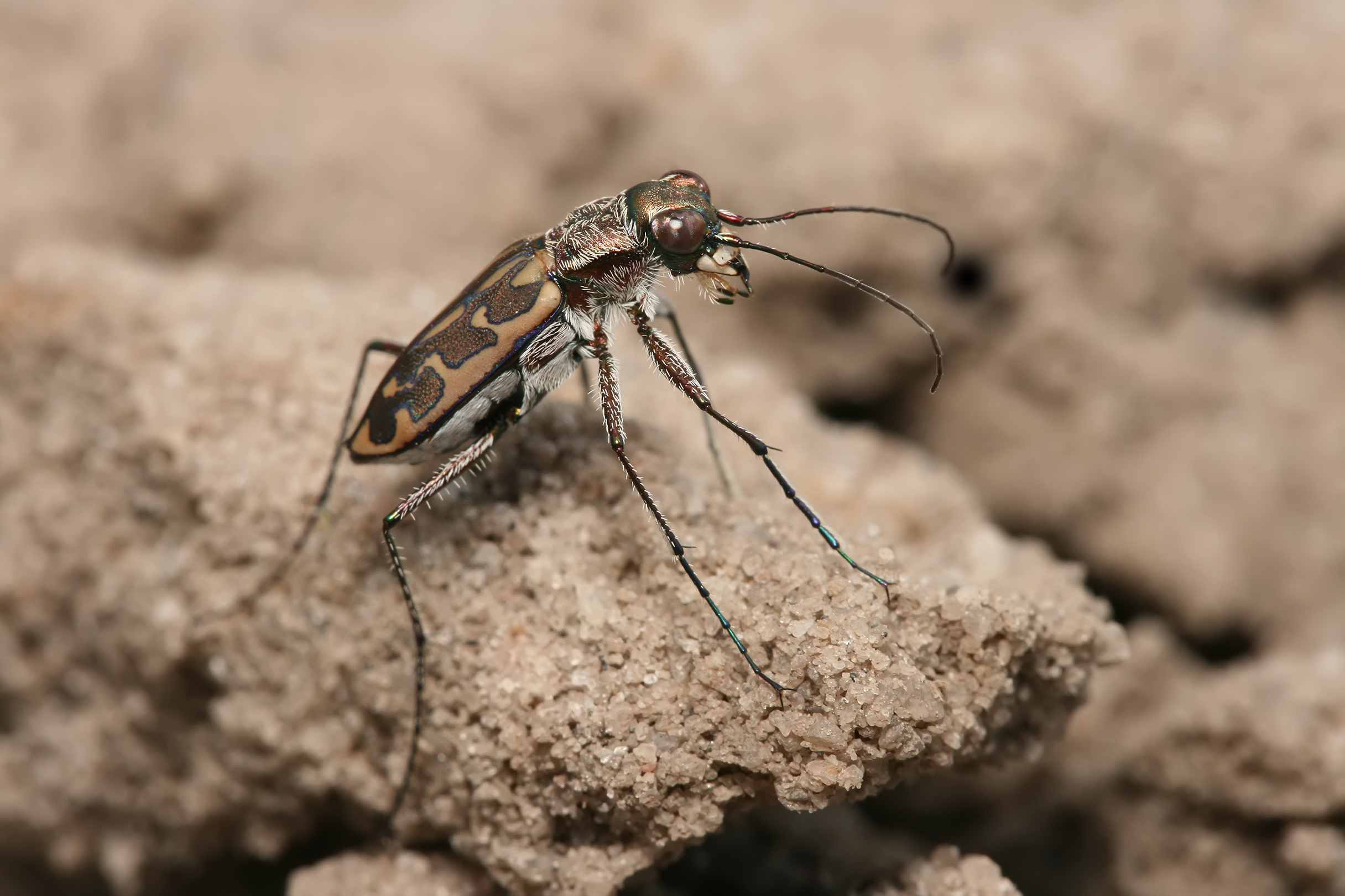
A Lophyra sp. tiger beetle from Tanzania

=== Ecology ===
Common habitats are under the bark of trees, under logs, or among rocks or sand by the edge of ponds and rivers. Most species are carnivorous and actively hunt for any invertebrate prey they can overpower. Some run swiftly to catch their prey; tiger beetles (Cicindelinae) can sustain speeds of 9 km/h (5.6 mph) – in relation to their body length they are among the fastest land animals on Earth. Unlike most Carabidae, which are nocturnal, the tiger beetles are active diurnal hunters and often brightly coloured; they have large eyes and hunt by sight. Ground beetles of the genus Promecognathus are specialised predators of the cyanide millipedes Harpaphe haydeniana and Xystocheir dissecta, countering the hydrogen cyanide that makes these millipedes poisonous to most carnivores.

== Relationship with humans ==
As predators of invertebrates, including many pests, most ground beetles are considered beneficial organisms. The caterpillar hunters (Calosoma) are famous for their habit of devouring prey in quantity, eagerly feeding on tussock moth (Lymantriinae) caterpillars, processionary caterpillars (Thaumetopoeinae) and woolly worms (Arctiinae), which, due to their urticating hairs, are avoided by most insectivores. Large numbers of the forest caterpillar hunter (C. sycophanta), native to Europe, were shipped to New England for biological control of the gypsy moth (Lymantria dispar) as early as 1905.

A few species are nuisance pests. Zabrus is one of the few herbivorous ground beetle genera, and on rare occasions Zabrus tenebrioides, for example, occurs abundantly enough to cause some damage to grain crops. Large species, usually the Carabinae, can become a nuisance if present in large numbers, particularly during outdoor activities such as camping; they void their defensive secretions when threatened, and in hiding among provisions, their presence may spoil food. Since ground beetles are generally reluctant or even unable to fly, mechanically blocking their potential routes of entry is usually easy. The use of insecticides specifically for carabid intrusion may lead to unfortunate side effects, such as the release of their secretions, so it generally is not a good idea unless the same applications are intended to exclude ants, parasites or other crawling pests.

Especially in the 19th century and to a lesser extent today, their large size and conspicuous coloration, as well as the odd morphology of some (e.g. the Lebiini), made many ground beetles a popular object of collection and study for professional and amateur coleopterologists. High prices were paid for rare and exotic specimens, and in the early to mid-19th century, a veritable "beetle craze" occurred in England. As mentioned above, Charles Darwin was an ardent collector of beetles when he was about 20 years old, to the extent that he would rather scour the countryside for rare specimens with William Darwin Fox, John Stevens Henslow, and Henry Thompson than to study theology as his father wanted him to do. In his autobiography, he fondly recalled his experiences with Licinus and Panagaeus, and wrote:

No poet ever felt more delight at seeing his first poem published than I did at seeing in Stephen's Illustrations of British Insects the magic words, "captured by C. Darwin, Esq."

== Evolution and systematics ==
The Adephaga are documented since the end of the Permian, about 250 million years ago (Mya). Ground beetles evolved in the latter Triassic, having separated from their closest relatives by 200 Mya. The family diversified throughout the Jurassic, and the more advanced lineages, such as the Harpalinae, underwent a vigorous radiation starting in the Cretaceous. The closest living relatives of the ground beetles are the false ground beetles (Trachypachidae) and the tiger beetles (Cicindelidae). They are sometimes even included in the Carabidae as subfamilies or as tribes incertae sedis, but more preferably they are united with the ground beetles in the superfamily Caraboidea, or Geadephaga.

=== Phylogeny ===
Much research has been done on elucidating the phylogeny of the ground beetles and adjusting systematics and taxonomy accordingly. While no completely firm consensus exists, a few points are generally accepted: The ground beetles seemingly consist of a number of more basal lineages and the extremely diverse Harpalinae, which contain over half the described species and into which several formerly independent families had to be subsumed.

A phylogenetic tree based on the mitochondrial phylogeny by Zhu et al.(2025):

- Trachypachidae
- Carabidae
  - Cicindelinae
  - - Carabinae
    - - Nebriinae
      - - Elaphrinae
        - - - - Broscinae
              - Paussinae
            - Rhysodinae
          - - - Promecognathinae
              - - Loricerinae
                - Omophroninae
            - - Scaritinae
              - - Brachininae
                - Harpalinae sensu lato
                  - Lebiinae
                  - - Ctenodactylinae
                    - - Harpalinae sensu stricto
                      - - - Dryptinae
                          - - Licininae (Diplocheila)
                            - - Panagaeinae
                              - Licininae (Chlaenius)
                        - - Pterostichinae
                          - Platyninae

=== Subfamilies ===
The taxonomy used here is primarily based on the Catalogue of Life and the Carabcat Database. Other classifications, while generally agreeing with the division into a basal radiation of more primitive lineages and the more advanced group informally called "Carabidae Conjunctae", differ in details. For example, the system used by the Tree of Life Web Project makes little use of subfamilies, listing most tribes as incertae sedis as to subfamily. Fauna Europaea, though, splits rather than lumps the Harpalinae, restricting them to what in the system used here is the tribe Harpalini. The exclusion of Trachypachidae as a separate family is now amply supported, as is the inclusion of Rhysodidae as a subfamily, closely related to Paussinae and Siagoninae.

The exclusive Harpalinae is presented here, because the majority of authors presently use this system, following the Carabidae of the World, Catalogue of Palaearctic Coleoptera, or the Carabcat Database (which is reflected the Catalogue of Life).

Tiger Beetles have historically been treated as a subfamily of Carabidae under the name Cicindelinae, but several studies since 2020 indicated that they should be treated as a family, Cicindelidae, a sister group to Carabidae.

- Anthiinae Bonelli, 1813
  - Tribe Anthiini Bonelli, 1813
  - Tribe Helluonini Hope, 1838
  - Tribe Physocrotaphini Chaudoir, 1863
- Apotominae LeConte, 1853
- Brachininae Bonelli, 1810
  - Tribe Brachinini Bonelli, 1810
  - Tribe Crepidogastrini Jeannel, 1949
- Broscinae Hope, 1838
  - Tribe Broscini Hope, 1838
- Carabinae Linnaeus, 1802
  - Tribe Carabini Linnaeus, 1802
  - Tribe Cychrini Perty, 1830
- Ctenodactylinae Laporte, 1834
  - Tribe Ctenodactylini Laporte, 1834
  - Tribe Hexagoniini G.Horn, 1881
- Dryptinae Bonelli, 1810
  - Tribe Dryptini Bonelli, 1810
  - Tribe Galeritini Kirby, 1825
  - Tribe Zuphiini Bonelli, 1810
- Elaphrinae Latreille, 1802
- Gineminae Ball & Shpeley, 2002
- Harpalinae Bonelli, 1810
  - Tribe Anisodactylini Lacordaire, 1854
  - Tribe Harpalini Bonelli, 1810
  - Tribe Pelmatellini Bates, 1882
  - Tribe Stenolophini Kirby, 1837
- Hiletinae Schiödte, 1847
- Lebiinae Bonelli, 1810
  - Tribe Cyclosomini Laporte, 1834
  - Tribe Lachnophorini LeConte, 1853
  - Tribe Lebiini Bonelli, 1810
  - Tribe Odacanthini Laporte, 1834
  - Tribe Perigonini G.Horn, 1881
- Licininae Bonelli, 1810
  - Tribe Chaetogenyini Emden, 1958
  - Tribe Chlaeniini Brullé, 1834
  - Tribe Licinini Bonelli, 1810
  - Tribe Oodini LaFerté-Sénectère, 1851
- Loricerinae Bonelli, 1810
- Melaeninae Csiki, 1933
- Migadopinae Chaudoir, 1861
  - Tribe Amarotypini Erwin, 1985
  - Tribe Migadopini Chaudoir, 1861
- Nebriinae Laporte, 1834
  - Tribe Cicindini Csiki, 1927
  - Tribe Nebriini Laporte, 1834
  - Tribe Notiokasiini Kavanaugh & Nègre, 1983
  - Tribe Notiophilini Motschulsky, 1850
  - Tribe Opisthiini Dupuis, 1912
  - Tribe Pelophilini Kavanaugh, 1996
- Nototylinae Bänninger, 1927
- Omophroninae Bonelli, 1810
- Orthogoniinae Schaum, 1857
  - Tribe Amorphomerini Sloane, 1923
  - Tribe Idiomorphini Bates, 1891
  - Tribe Orthogoniini Schaum, 1857
- Panagaeinae Bonelli, 1810
  - Tribe Brachygnathini Basilewsky, 1946
  - Tribe Panagaeini Bonelli, 1810
  - Tribe Peleciini Chaudoir, 1880
- Patrobinae Kirby, 1837
  - Tribe Lissopogonini Zamotajlov, 2000
  - Tribe Patrobini Kirby, 1837
- Paussinae Latreille, 1806
  - Tribe Metriini LeConte, 1853
  - Tribe Ozaenini Hope, 1838
  - Tribe Paussini Latreille, 1806
  - Tribe Protopaussini Gestro, 1892
- Platyninae Bonelli, 1810
  - Tribe Omphreini Ganglbauer, 1891
  - Tribe Platynini Bonelli, 1810
  - Tribe Sphodrini Laporte, 1834
- Promecognathinae LeConte, 1853
  - Tribe Axinidiini Basilewsky, 1963
  - Tribe Dalyatini Mateu, 2002
  - Tribe Promecognathini LeConte, 1853
  - Tribe †Palaeoaxinidiini McKay, 1991
- Pseudomorphinae Hope, 1838
- Psydrinae LeConte, 1853
  - Tribe Gehringiini Darlington, 1933
  - Tribe Moriomorphini Sloane, 1890
  - Tribe Psydrini LeConte, 1853
- Pterostichinae Bonelli, 1810
  - Tribe Chaetodactylini Tschitscherine, 1903
  - Tribe Cnemalobini Germain, 1911
  - Tribe Cratocerini Lacordaire, 1854
  - Tribe Microcheilini Jeannel, 1948
  - Tribe Morionini Brullé, 1837
  - Tribe Pterostichini Bonelli, 1810
  - Tribe Zabrini Bonelli, 1810
- Rhysodinae Laporte, 1840
  - Tribe Clinidiini R.T. & J.R.Bell, 1978
  - Tribe Dhysorini R.T. & J.R.Bell, 1978
  - Tribe Leoglymmiini R.T. & J.R.Bell, 1978
  - Tribe Medisorini R.T. & J.R.Bell, 1987
  - Tribe Omoglymmiini R.T. & J.R.Bell, 1978
  - Tribe Rhysodini Laporte, 1840
  - Tribe Sloanoglymmiini R.T. & J.R.Bell, 1991
- Scaritinae Bonelli, 1810
  - Tribe Clivinini Rafinesque, 1815
  - Tribe Corintascarini Basilewsky, 1973
  - Tribe Dyschiriini Kolbe, 1880
  - Tribe Salcediini Alluaud, 1930
  - Tribe Scaritini Bonelli, 1810
- Siagoninae Bonelli, 1813
  - Tribe Enceladini G.Horn, 1881
  - Tribe Siagonini Bonelli, 1813
- Trechinae Bonelli, 1810
  - Tribe Bembidarenini Maddison et al., 2019
  - Tribe Bembidiini Stephens, 1827
  - Tribe Pogonini Laporte, 1834
  - Tribe Sinozolini Deuve, 1997
  - Tribe Trechini Bonelli, 1810
  - Tribe Zolini Sharp, 1886
- Xenaroswellianinae Erwin, 2007
- †Conjunctiinae Ponomarenko, 1977
- †Protorabinae Ponomarenko, 1977
- Unassigned, extinct genera:
  - †Agatoides Motschulsky, 1856
  - †Amphoxyne Bode, 1953
  - †Carabites Heer, 1852
  - †Cavicarabus Hong, 1991
  - †Conexicoxa Lin, 1986
  - †Cymatopterus Lomnicki, 1894
  - †Fangshania Hong, 1981
  - †Glenopterus Heer, 1847
  - †Hebeicarabus Hong, 1983
  - †Megacarabus Hong, 1983
  - †Meileyingia Hong, 1987
  - †Miocarabus Hong, 1983
  - †Neothanes Scudder, 1890
  - †Procarabus Oppenheim, 1888
  - †Prosynactus Bode, 1953
  - †Shanwangicarabus Hong, 1985
  - †Sinis Heer, 1862
  - †Sinocalosoma Hong & Wang, 1986
  - †Sinocaralosoma Hong, 1984
  - †Sunocarabus Hong, 1987
  - †Tauredon Handlirsch, 1910
  - †Wuchangicarabus Hong, 1991
  - †Xishanocarabus Hong, 1984
  - †Yunnanocarabus Lin, 1977
