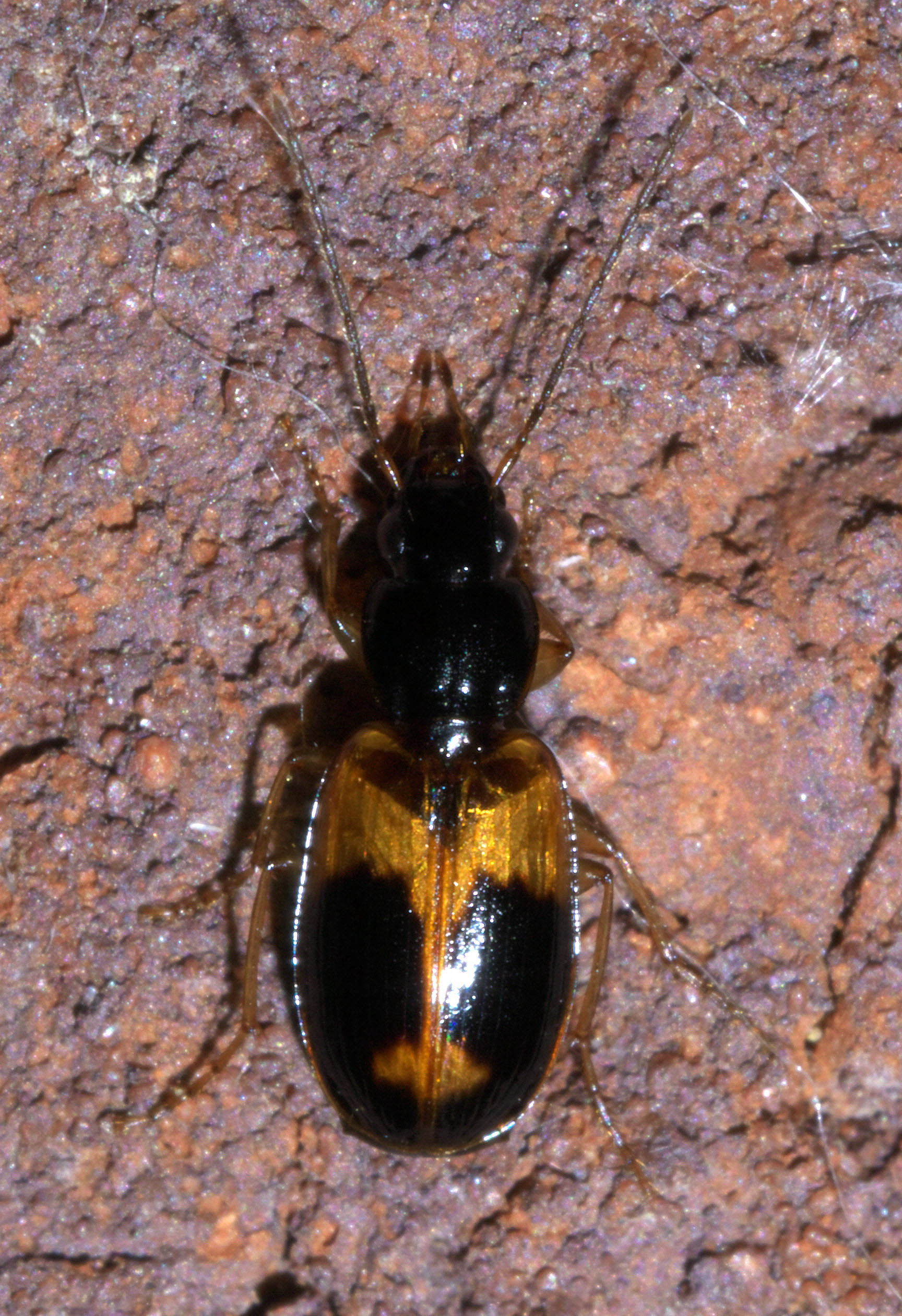
- Badister, Oklahoma

Scientific classification
- Domain: Eukaryota
- Kingdom: Animalia
- Phylum: Arthropoda
- Class: Insecta
- Order: Coleoptera
- Suborder: Adephaga
- Family: Carabidae
- Subfamily: Licininae; Bonelli, 1810

= Licininae =

Subfamily of beetles

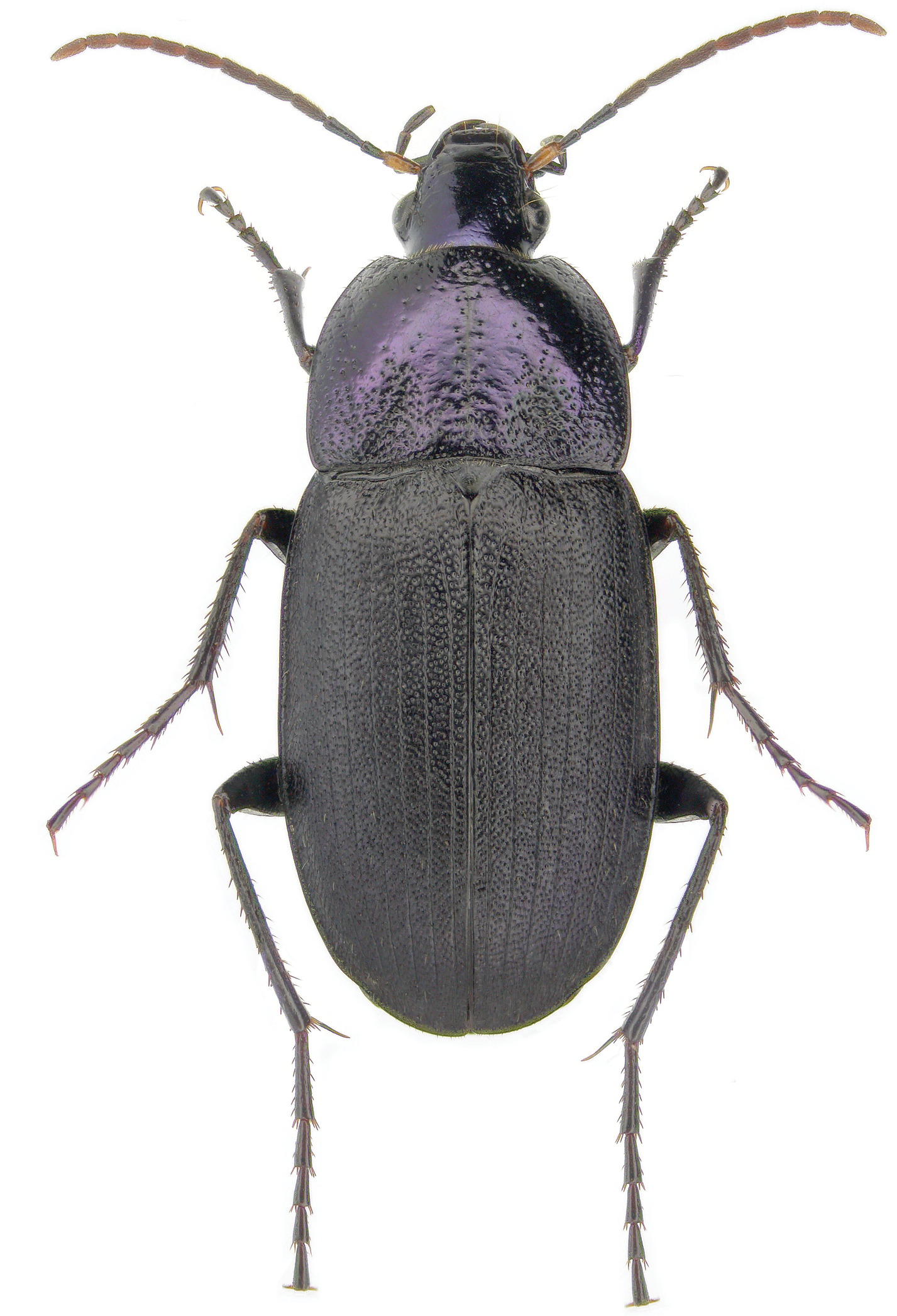
Chlaenius purpuricollis imago

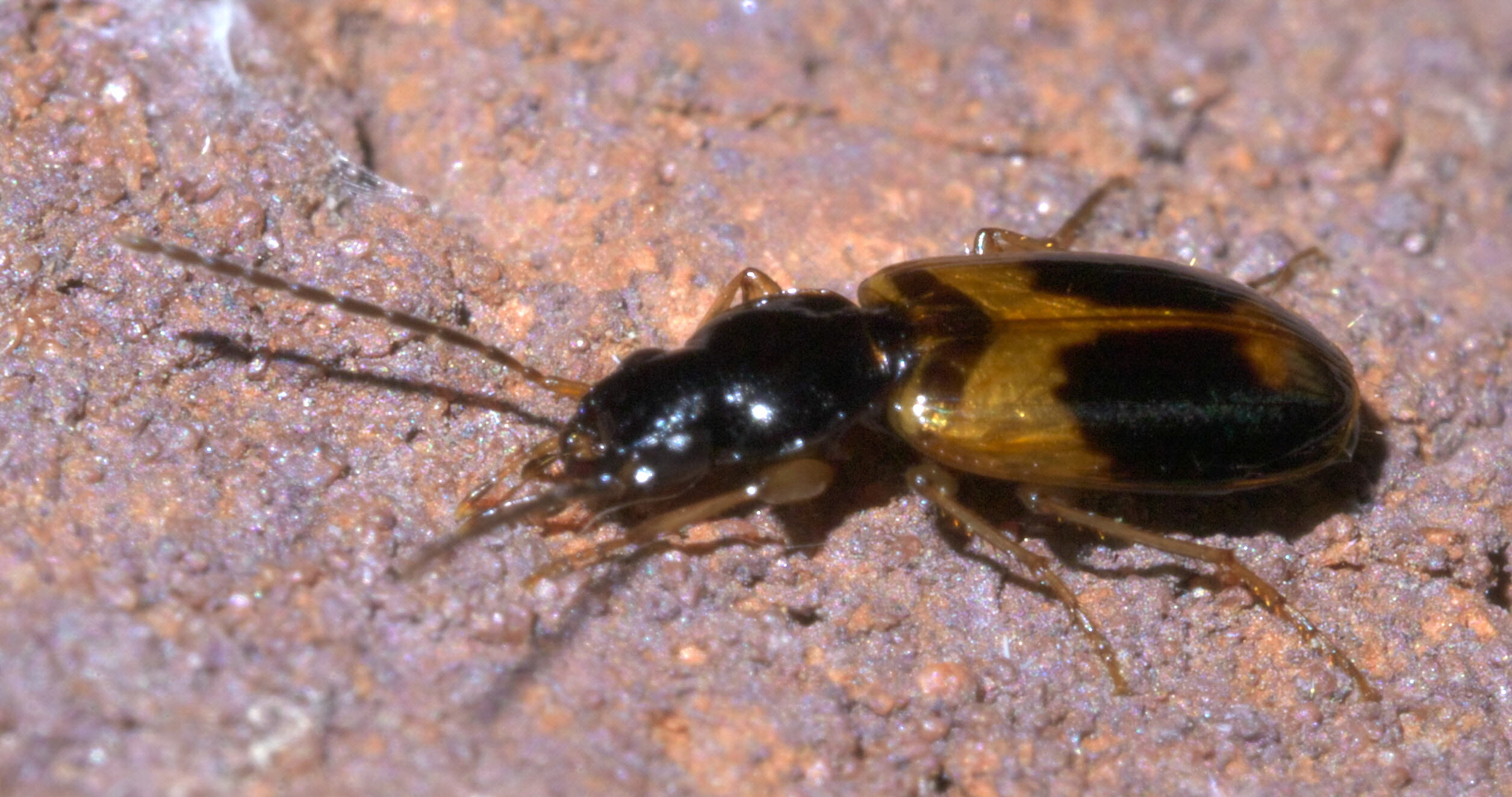
Badister

Licininae is a subfamily in the beetle family Carabidae. There are more than 80 genera and 1,800 described species in Licininae.

== Genera ==
These 87 genera belong to the subfamily Licininae:

Tribe Chaetogenyini Emden, 1958
Camptotoma Reiche, 1843
Tribe Chlaeniini Brullé, 1834

Callistomimus Chaudoir, 1872
Callistus Bonelli, 1810
Actodus Alluaud, 1915
Chlaenius Bonelli, 1810
Eccoptomenus Chaudoir, 1850
Ectenognathus Murray, 1858
Globulipalpus Sciaky & Facchini, 2019
Harpaglossus Motschulsky, 1858
Hololeius LaFerté-Sénectère, 1851
Holosoma Semenov, 1889
Mirachlaenius Facchini, 2011
Parachlaenius Kolbe, 1894
Perissostomus Alluaud, 1930
Procletodema Péringuey, 1898
Procletus Péringuey, 1896
Rhopalomelus Boheman, 1848
Sphodroschema Alluaud, 1930
Stenoodes Basilewsky, 1953
Straneomelus Sciaky & Facchini, 2019
Stuhlmannium Kolbe, 1894
Viridagonum Lassalle, 2015
†Rhopalochlaenius Zhang; Sun & Zhang, 1994

Tribe Licinini Bonelli, 1810

Dicaelus Bonelli, 1813
Diplocheila Brullé, 1835
Dicrochile Guérin-Méneville, 1846
Atrotus Péringuey, 1896
Dilonchus Andrewes, 1936
Hormacrus Sloane, 1898
Lacordairia Laporte, 1867
Lestignathus Erichson, 1842
Microferonia Blackburn, 1890
Microzargus Sciaky & Facchini, 1997
Platylytron W.J.MacLeay, 1873
Siagonyx W.J.MacLeay, 1871
Zargus Wollaston, 1854
Badister Clairville, 1806
Colpostoma Semenov, 1889
Derostichus Motschulsky, 1860
Eurygnathus Wollaston, 1854
Eutogeneius Solier, 1849
Licinus Latreille, 1802
Omestes Andrewes, 1933
Physolaesthus Chaudoir, 1850

Tribe Oodini LaFerté-Sénectère, 1851

Dercylus Laporte, 1832
Geobaenus Dejean, 1829
Dicaelindus W.S.MacLeay, 1825
Melanchiton Andrewes, 1940
Melanchrous Andrewes, 1940
Acanthoodes Basilewsky, 1953
Acutosternus Lecordier & Girard, 1988
Adelopomorpha Heller, 1916
Anatrichis LeConte, 1853
Bamaroodes Gueorguiev, 2014
Brachyodes Jeannel, 1949
Chaetocrepis Chaudoir, 1857
Coptocarpus Chaudoir, 1857
Dercylinus Chaudoir, 1883
Evolenes LeConte, 1853
Holcocoleus Chaudoir, 1883
Hoplolenus LaFerté-Sénectère, 1851
Lobatodes Basilewsky, 1956
Lonchosternus LaFerté-Sénectère, 1851
Macroprotus Chaudoir, 1878
Megaloodes Lesne, 1896
Microodes Jeannel, 1949
Miltodes Andrewes, 1922
Nanodiodes Bousquet, 1996
Neoodes Basilewsky, 1953
Nothoodes Gueorguiev & Liang, 2020
Oodes Bonelli, 1810
Oodinus Motschulsky, 1865
Orthocerodus Basilewsky, 1946
Polychaetus Chaudoir, 1882
Prionognathus LaFerté-Sénectère, 1851
Protopidius Basilewsky, 1949
Pseudoodes Gueorguiev & Liang, 2020
Pseudosphaerodes Jeannel, 1949
Simous Chaudoir, 1882
Sphaerodinus Jeannel, 1949
Sphoerodes Chaudoir, 1883
Stenocrepis Chaudoir, 1857
Sundaoodes Gueorguiev & Liang, 2020
Systolocranius Chaudoir, 1857
Thaioodes Gueorguiev, 2014
Thryptocerus Chaudoir, 1878
Trichopalpoodes B.Gueorguiev & J.Schmidt, 2016
