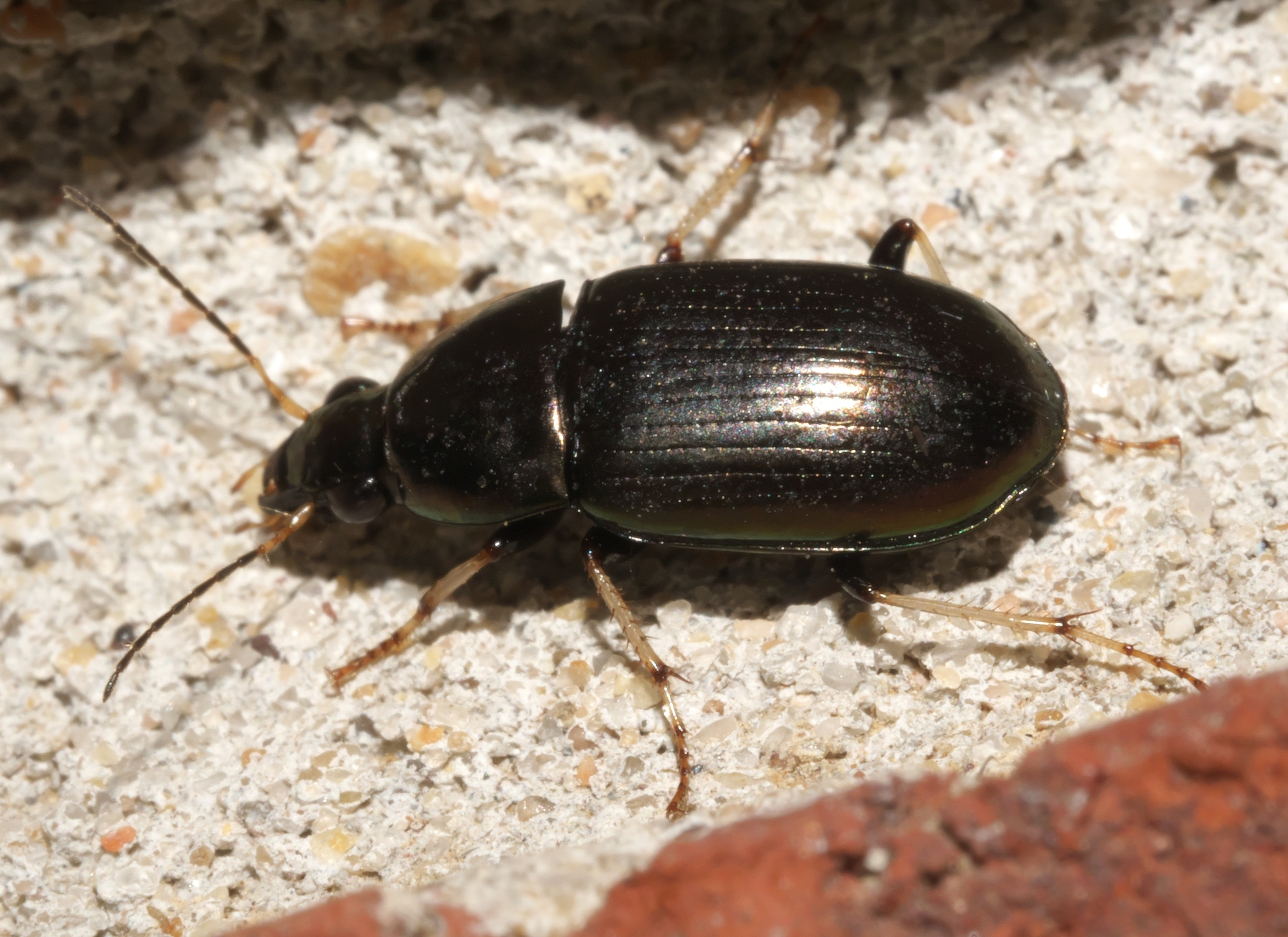
- Stenocrepis cuprea, Oklahoma

Scientific classification
- Domain: Eukaryota
- Kingdom: Animalia
- Phylum: Arthropoda
- Class: Insecta
- Order: Coleoptera
- Suborder: Adephaga
- Family: Carabidae
- Subfamily: Licininae
- Tribe: Oodini; La Ferte-Senectere, 1851

Subtribes
- Dercylina Sloane, 1923; Geobaenina Péringuey, 1896; Melanchitonina Jeannel, 1948; Oodina LaFerté-Sénectère, 1851

= Oodini =

Tribe of beetles

Oodini is a ground beetle tribe in the subfamily Harpalinae. Oodines are found worldwide (with highest diversity in tropical Africa) and are generally associated with standing water. This tribe contains more than 400 species arrayed in 43 genera. Beetles in Oodini are distinguishable from other members of Carabidae by a combination of two characters: a laterally coadunate metepisternum (a feature of the exoskeleton), and an elytral ridge formed by the fusion of intervals 7 and 8.

== Genera ==
These 43 genera belong to the tribe Oodini:

- Acanthoodes Basilewsky, 1953
- Acutosternus Lecordier & Girard, 1988
- Adelopomorpha Heller, 1916
- Anatrichis LeConte, 1853
- Bamaroodes Gueorguiev, 2014
- Brachyodes Jeannel, 1949
- Chaetocrepis Chaudoir, 1857
- Coptocarpus Chaudoir, 1857
- Dercylinus Chaudoir, 1883
- Dercylus Laporte, 1832
- Dicaelindus W.S.MacLeay, 1825
- Evolenes LeConte, 1853
- Geobaenus Dejean, 1829
- Holcocoleus Chaudoir, 1883
- Hoplolenus LaFerté-Sénectère, 1851
- Lobatodes Basilewsky, 1956
- Lonchosternus LaFerté-Sénectère, 1851
- Macroprotus Chaudoir, 1878
- Megaloodes Lesne, 1896
- Melanchiton Andrewes, 1940
- Melanchrous Andrewes, 1940
- Microodes Jeannel, 1949
- Miltodes Andrewes, 1922
- Nanodiodes Bousquet, 1996
- Neoodes Basilewsky, 1953
- Nothoodes Gueorguiev & Liang, 2020
- Oodes Bonelli, 1810
- Oodinus Motschulsky, 1865
- Orthocerodus Basilewsky, 1946
- Polychaetus Chaudoir, 1882
- Prionognathus LaFerté-Sénectère, 1851
- Protopidius Basilewsky, 1949
- Pseudoodes Gueorguiev & Liang, 2020
- Pseudosphaerodes Jeannel, 1949
- Simous Chaudoir, 1882
- Sphaerodinus Jeannel, 1949
- Sphoerodes Chaudoir, 1883
- Stenocrepis Chaudoir, 1857
- Sundaoodes Gueorguiev & Liang, 2020
- Systolocranius Chaudoir, 1857
- Thaioodes Gueorguiev, 2014
- Thryptocerus Chaudoir, 1878
- Trichopalpoodes B.Gueorguiev & J.Schmidt, 2016
