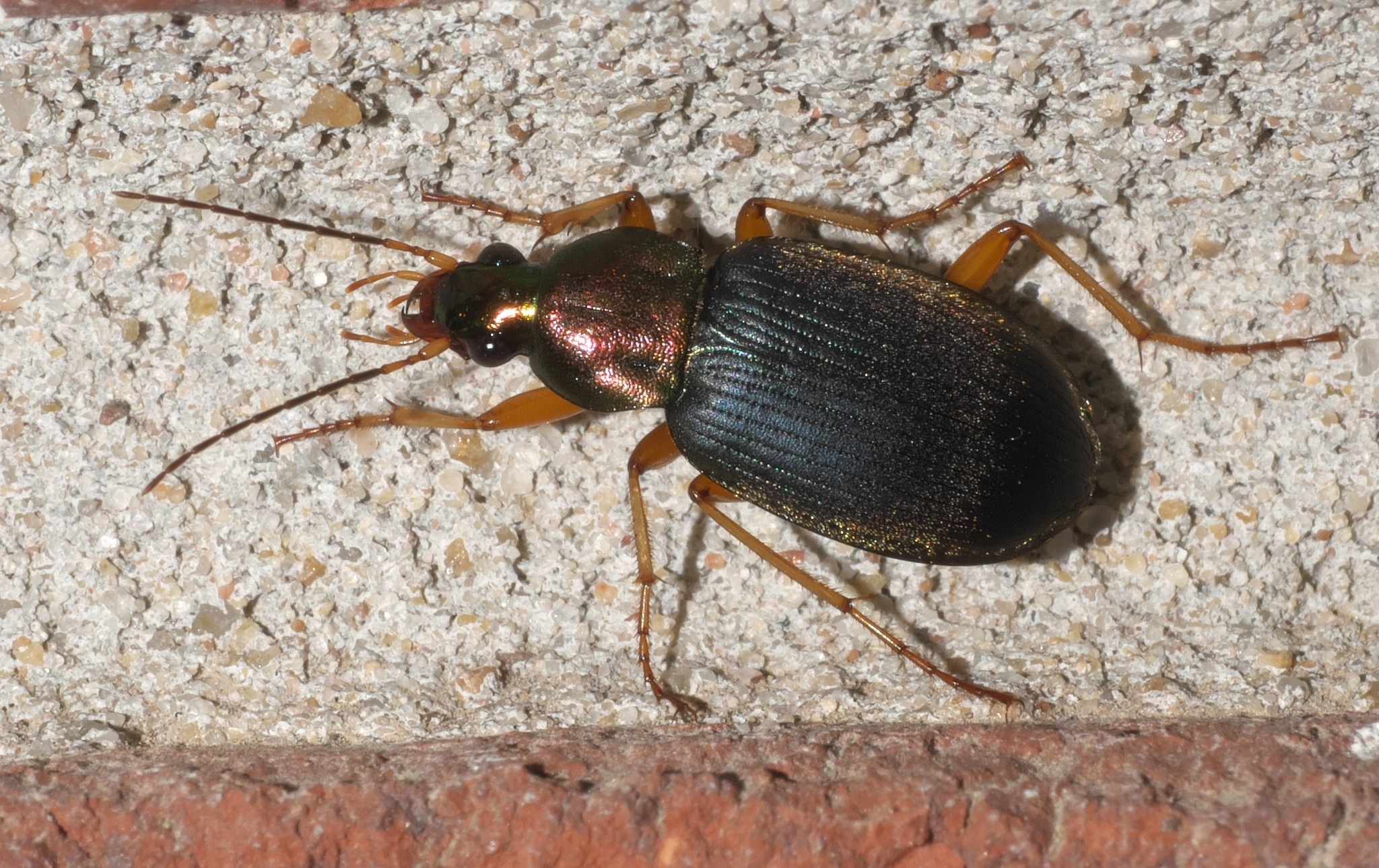
- Chlaenius tricolor, Oklahoma

Scientific classification
- Domain: Eukaryota
- Kingdom: Animalia
- Phylum: Arthropoda
- Class: Insecta
- Order: Coleoptera
- Suborder: Adephaga
- Family: Carabidae
- Subfamily: Harpalinae
- Tribe: Chlaeniini; Brullé, 1834

Subtribes
- Callistina Laporte, 1834; Chlaeniina Brullé, 1834

= Chlaeniini =

Tribe of beetles

Chlaeniini is a tribe of ground beetles in the family Carabidae. There are more than 20 genera and 1,000 described species in Chlaeniini, found worldwide. The genus Chlaenius has more than 900 species.

== Genera ==
These 22 genera belong to the tribe Chlaeniini:

- Actodus Alluaud, 1915
- Callistomimus Chaudoir, 1872
- Callistus Bonelli, 1810
- Chlaenius Bonelli, 1810
- Eccoptomenus Chaudoir, 1850
- Ectenognathus Murray, 1858
- Globulipalpus Sciaky & Facchini, 2019
- Harpaglossus Motschulsky, 1858
- Hololeius LaFerté-Sénectère, 1851
- Holosoma Semenov, 1889
- Mirachlaenius Facchini, 2011
- Parachlaenius Kolbe, 1894
- Perissostomus Alluaud, 1930
- Procletodema Péringuey, 1898
- Procletus Péringuey, 1896
- Rhopalomelus Boheman, 1848
- Sphodroschema Alluaud, 1930
- Stenoodes Basilewsky, 1953
- Straneomelus Sciaky & Facchini, 2019
- Stuhlmannium Kolbe, 1894
- Viridagonum Lassalle, 2015
- † Rhopalochlaenius Zhang; Sun & Zhang, 1994
