= Oud (disambiguation) =

The oud is a musical instrument.

Oud or OUD may also refer to:

- Agarwood, a perfume or incense material
- OUD, a registered trademark of the Orthodox Union for identifying kosher products that contain dairy
- Oxford Universal Dictionary, American name for an edition of the Shorter Oxford English Dictionary
- Opioid use disorder
- Angads Airport, by IATA code
- Oud (surname)
- Oud bruin
- Oud Gastel
- Oud (instrument)

== See also ==
- Oude or Oudh, historical name for the Awadh region in India
- OOD (disambiguation)
