= Ood (disambiguation) =

Ood or OOD may refer to:

- Ood, a fictional alien species from Doctor Who
- Ood, the name of a prophet in The Gods of Pegāna by Lord Dunsany
- ood, ISO 639-3 code for the Oʼodham language
- Druzhestvo s ogranichena otgovornost, a type of legal entity in Bulgaria
- Officer of the day, at military installations
- Officer of the deck, in the US Navy and Coast Guard
- Object-oriented design, in software

== See also ==
- Oodes, a genus of beetles
- Oud (disambiguation)
