= Stenocrepis duodecimstriata =

Scientific classification
- Domain: Eukaryota
- Kingdom: Animalia
- Phylum: Arthropoda
- Class: Insecta
- Order: Coleoptera
- Suborder: Adephaga
- Family: Carabidae
- Genus: Stenocrepis
- Species: S. duodecimstriata

Binomial name
- Stenocrepis duodecimstriata (Chevrolat, 1836)

Synonyms
- Oodes humilis Laferte-Senectere, 1851; Oodes striatellus Laferte-Senectere, 1851

Species of beetle

Stenocrepis duodecimstriata is a species of beetle in the family Carabidae. It is found in the Caribbean, Guatemala, Mexico, and the United States.
