= Microodes =

Scientific classification
- Domain: Eukaryota
- Kingdom: Animalia
- Phylum: Arthropoda
- Class: Insecta
- Order: Coleoptera
- Suborder: Adephaga
- Family: Carabidae
- Subfamily: Licininae
- Tribe: Oodini
- Subtribe: Oodina
- Genus: Microodes; Jeannel, 1949

Genus of beetles

Microodes is a genus in the ground beetle family Carabidae. There are about six described species in Microodes.

== Species ==
These six species belong to the genus Microodes:

- Microodes altostriatus Lecordier & Girard, 1987 (Cameroon)
- Microodes artus Lecordier, 1990 (DR Congo, Rwanda)
- Microodes decorsei (Alluaud, 1936) (Madagascar)
- Microodes deflexus Lecordier & Girard, 1987 (Cameroon)
- Microodes mirei Lecordier & Girard, 1987 (Cameroon)
- Microodes nanus (Péringuey, 1896) (Africa)
