= Stenocrepis cuprea =

Scientific classification
- Domain: Eukaryota
- Kingdom: Animalia
- Phylum: Arthropoda
- Class: Insecta
- Order: Coleoptera
- Suborder: Adephaga
- Family: Carabidae
- Genus: Stenocrepis
- Species: S. cuprea

Binomial name
- Stenocrepis cuprea (Chaudoir, 1843)

Synonyms
- Oodes cupreus Chevrolat, 1843b; Oodes leucodactylus Laferte-Senectere, 1851

Species of beetle

Stenocrepis cuprea is a species of beetle in the family Carabidae. It is found in Ontario, Canada and the United States.
