= Nanodiodes =

Scientific classification
- Domain: Eukaryota
- Kingdom: Animalia
- Phylum: Arthropoda
- Class: Insecta
- Order: Coleoptera
- Suborder: Adephaga
- Family: Carabidae
- Subfamily: Licininae
- Tribe: Oodini
- Subtribe: Oodina
- Genus: Nanodiodes; Bousquet, 1996

Genus of beetles

Nanodiodes is a genus in the beetle family Carabidae. There are about five described species in Nanodiodes.

== Species ==
These five species belong to the genus Nanodiodes:

- Nanodiodes australasiae (Chaudoir, 1882) (Australia)
- Nanodiodes lilliputanus (W.J.MacLeay, 1888) (Australia)
- Nanodiodes piceus (Nietner, 1856) (China, Japan, Indomalaya)
- Nanodiodes sexstriatus (Sloane, 1900) (Australia)
- Nanodiodes westermanni (LaFerté-Sénectère, 1851) (Japan, Indomalaya)
