= Macroprotus =

Scientific classification
- Domain: Eukaryota
- Kingdom: Animalia
- Phylum: Arthropoda
- Class: Insecta
- Order: Coleoptera
- Suborder: Adephaga
- Family: Carabidae
- Subfamily: Licininae
- Tribe: Oodini
- Subtribe: Oodina
- Genus: Macroprotus; Chaudoir, 1878

Genus of beetles

Macroprotus is a genus in the ground beetle family Carabidae. There are at least two described species in Macroprotus, found in Brazil.

== Species ==
These two species belong to the genus Macroprotus:

- Macroprotus forticornis Chaudoir, 1883
- Macroprotus tenuicornis Chaudoir, 1878
