= Simous =

Scientific classification
- Domain: Eukaryota
- Kingdom: Animalia
- Phylum: Arthropoda
- Class: Insecta
- Order: Coleoptera
- Suborder: Adephaga
- Family: Carabidae
- Subfamily: Licininae
- Tribe: Oodini
- Subtribe: Oodina
- Genus: Simous; Chaudoir, 1882

Genus of beetles

Simous is a genus in the beetle family Carabidae. There are about nine described species in Simous.

== Species ==
These nine species belong to the genus Simous:

- Simous aeneus (LaFerté-Sénectère, 1851)
- Simous annamita Csiki, 1931 (India, Myanmar, and Thailand)
- Simous borneensis (Bates, 1889) (Indonesia and Borneo)
- Simous laevissimus (Chaudoir, 1882) (Indonesia and New Guinea)
- Simous lampros Bates, 1892 (India, Myanmar, and Cambodia)
- Simous mouhotii (Chaudoir, 1869) (Cambodia and Laos)
- Simous nigriceps (Wiedemann, 1821) (India and Myanmar)
- Simous nubilus Andrewes, 1933 (Indonesia)
- Simous obscurus Louwerens, 1951 (Indonesia)
