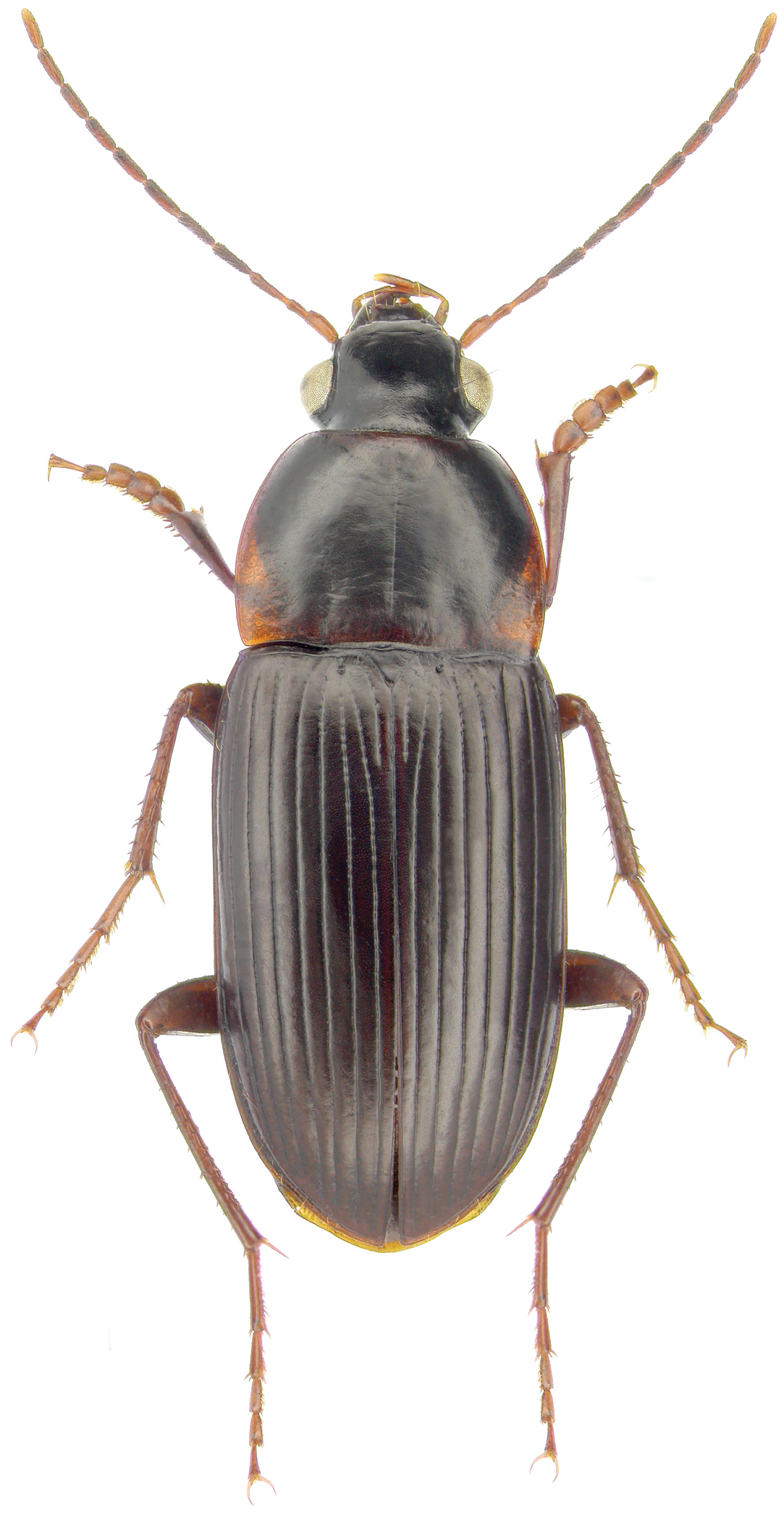

Scientific classification
- Domain: Eukaryota
- Kingdom: Animalia
- Phylum: Arthropoda
- Class: Insecta
- Order: Coleoptera
- Suborder: Adephaga
- Family: Carabidae
- Genus: Oodes
- Species: O. parallelus

Binomial name
- Oodes parallelus Say, 1830

Synonyms
- Lachnocrepis parallela (Say, 1830)

= Oodes parallelus =

Species of beetle

Oodes parallelus is a species of ground beetle in the family Carabidae, found in the United States and Canada.
