= Dercylinus =

Scientific classification
- Domain: Eukaryota
- Kingdom: Animalia
- Phylum: Arthropoda
- Class: Insecta
- Order: Coleoptera
- Suborder: Adephaga
- Family: Carabidae
- Subfamily: Licininae
- Tribe: Oodini
- Subtribe: Oodina
- Genus: Dercylinus; Chaudoir, 1883
- Species: D. impressus

Binomial name
- Dercylinus impressus (LeConte, 1853)

Genus of beetles

Dercylinus is a genus in the ground beetle family Carabidae. This genus has a single species, Dercylinus impressus. It is found in the United States.
