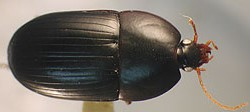
- Coptocarpus philipi

Scientific classification
- Domain: Eukaryota
- Kingdom: Animalia
- Phylum: Arthropoda
- Class: Insecta
- Order: Coleoptera
- Suborder: Adephaga
- Family: Carabidae
- Subfamily: Licininae
- Tribe: Oodini
- Subtribe: Oodina
- Genus: Coptocarpus; Chaudoir, 1857

= Coptocarpus =

Genus of beetles

Coptocarpus is a genus in the beetle family Carabidae. There are at least 20 described species in Coptocarpus, found in Australia and New Caldedonia.

== Species ==
These 20 species belong to the genus Coptocarpus:

- Coptocarpus amieuensis Will & B.Gueorguiev, 2021 (New Caledonia)
- Coptocarpus australis (Dejean, 1831) (Australia)
- Coptocarpus championensis Chaudoir, 1883 (Australia)
- Coptocarpus chaudoiri W.J.MacLeay, 1873 (Australia)
- Coptocarpus chimbu Erwin, 1974 (New Guinea)
- Coptocarpus cyllodinus (Fauvel, 1882) (New Caledonia)
- Coptocarpus doddi Sloane, 1910 (Australia)
- Coptocarpus erwini Will & B.Gueorguiev, 2021 (New Caledonia)
- Coptocarpus fuscitarsis (Blanchard, 1842) (Australia)
- Coptocarpus gibbus Chaudoir, 1883 (Australia)
- Coptocarpus grossus Erwin, 1974 (Australia)
- Coptocarpus impar Sloane, 1910 (Australia)
- Coptocarpus lescheni Will & B.Gueorguiev, 2021 (New Caledonia)
- Coptocarpus magnus Will & B.Gueorguiev, 2021 (New Caledonia)
- Coptocarpus nitidus W.J.MacLeay, 1873 (Australia)
- Coptocarpus oberprielerae Baehr, 2017 (Australia)
- Coptocarpus philipi Erwin, 1974 (Australia)
- Coptocarpus schaumi (Chaudoir, 1882) (United States)
- Coptocarpus thoracicus (Laporte, 1867) (Australia)
- Coptocarpus yorkensis Erwin, 1974 (Australia)
