= Oodinus alutaceus =

Scientific classification
- Domain: Eukaryota
- Kingdom: Animalia
- Phylum: Arthropoda
- Class: Insecta
- Order: Coleoptera
- Suborder: Adephaga
- Family: Carabidae
- Genus: Oodinus
- Species: O. alutaceus

Binomial name
- Oodinus alutaceus (Bates, 1882)

Species of beetle

Oodinus alutaceus is a species of ground beetle in the family Carabidae. It is found in Central America and North America.
