= Lobatodes =

Scientific classification
- Domain: Eukaryota
- Kingdom: Animalia
- Phylum: Arthropoda
- Class: Insecta
- Order: Coleoptera
- Suborder: Adephaga
- Family: Carabidae
- Subfamily: Licininae
- Tribe: Oodini
- Subtribe: Oodina
- Genus: Lobatodes; Basilewsky, 1956

Genus of beetles

Lobatodes is a genus in the ground beetle family Carabidae. There are at least two described species in Lobatodes.

== Species ==
These two species belong to the genus Lobatodes:

- Lobatodes bullatus Basilewsky, 1956 (Democratic Republic of the Congo)
- Lobatodes decellei Basilewsky, 1968 (Ivory Coast)
