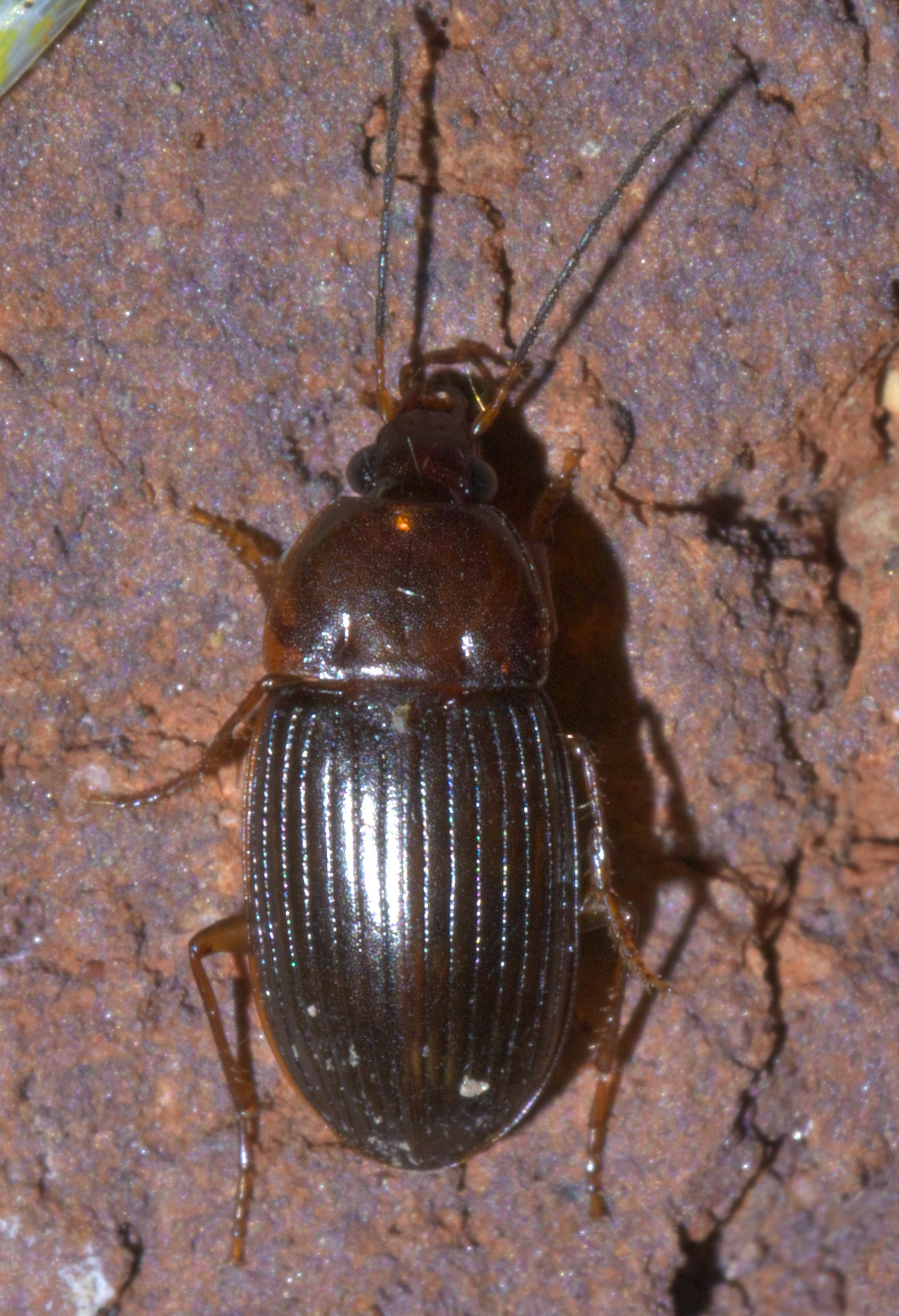

Scientific classification
- Kingdom: Animalia
- Phylum: Arthropoda
- Class: Insecta
- Order: Coleoptera
- Suborder: Adephaga
- Family: Carabidae
- Genus: Anatrichis
- Species: A. minuta

Binomial name
- Anatrichis minuta (Dejean, 1831)

= Anatrichis minuta =

Species of beetle

Anatrichis minuta is a species of ground beetle in the family Carabidae. It is found in North America.

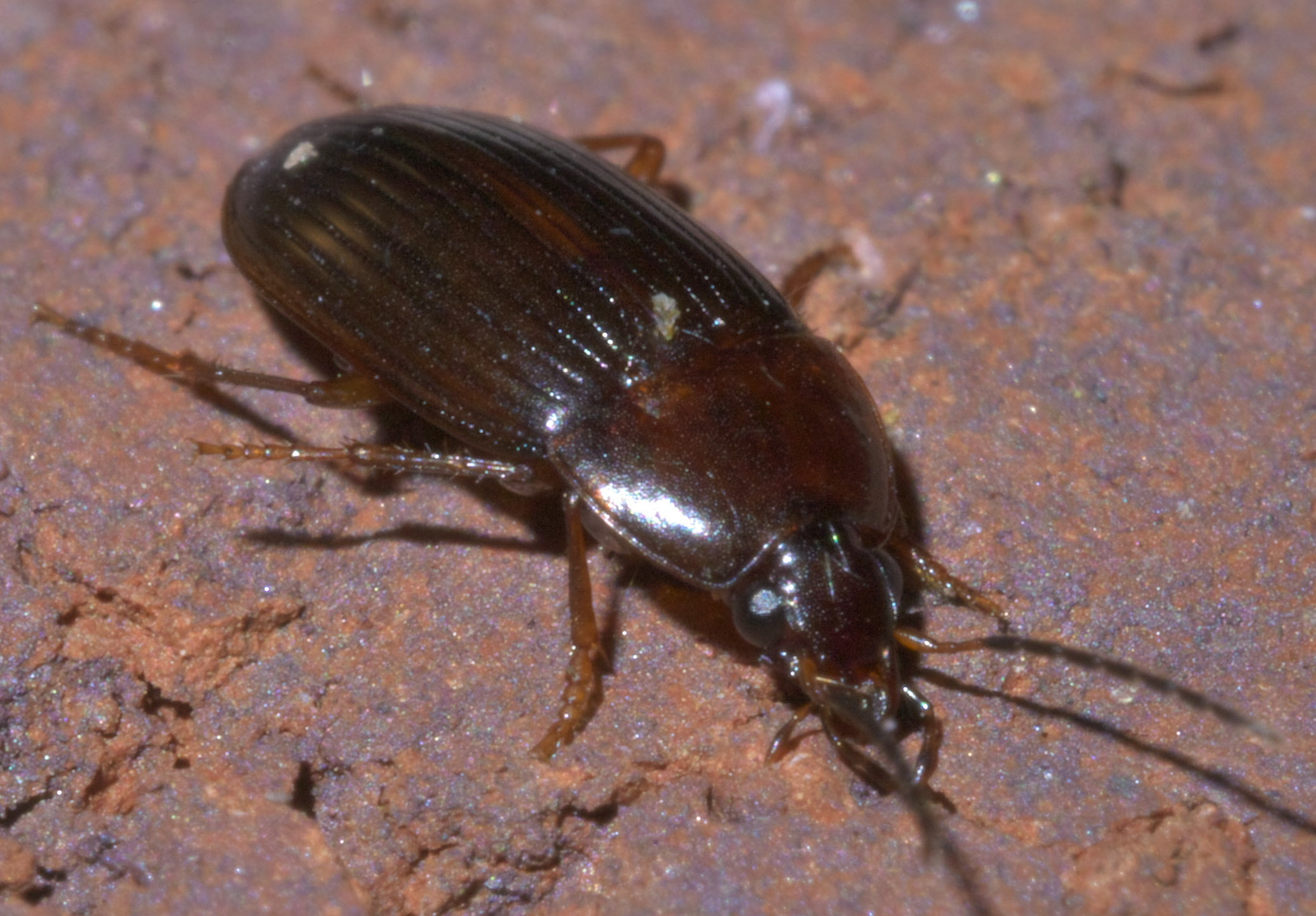

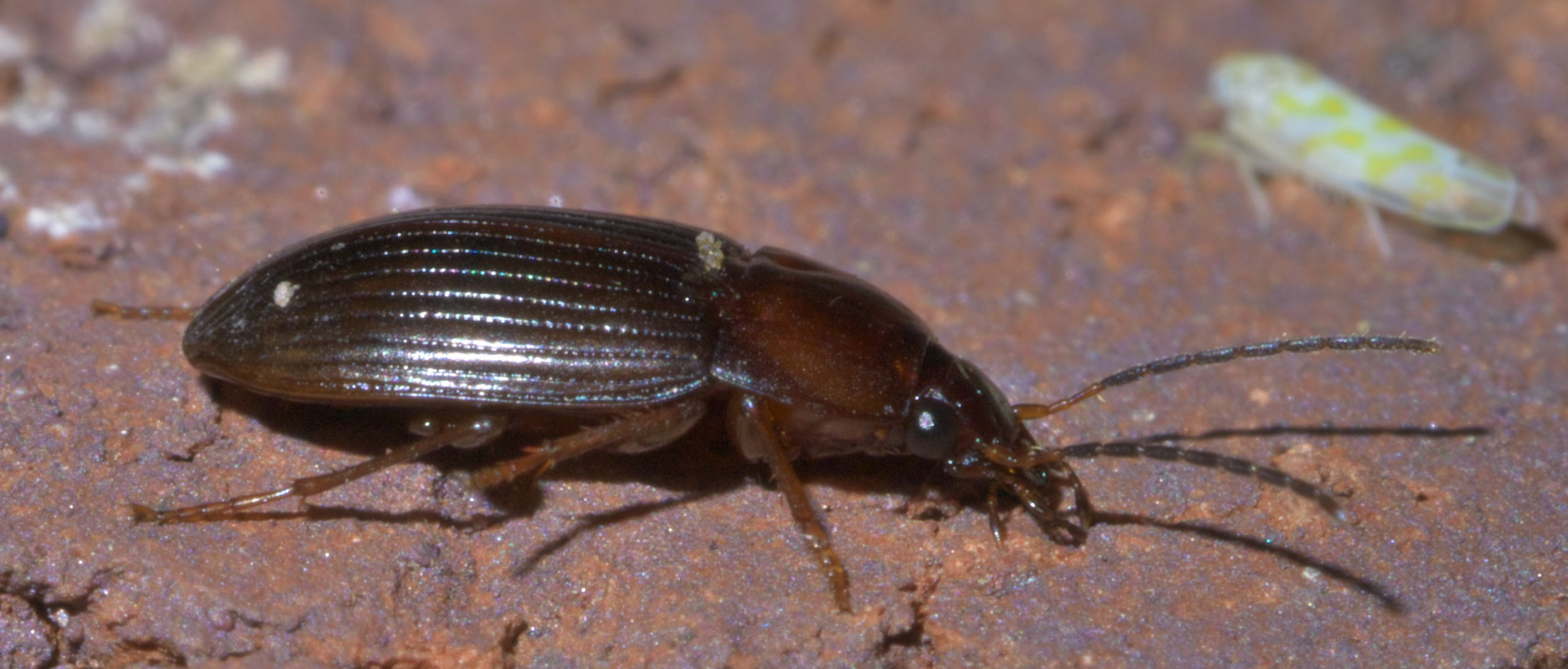
