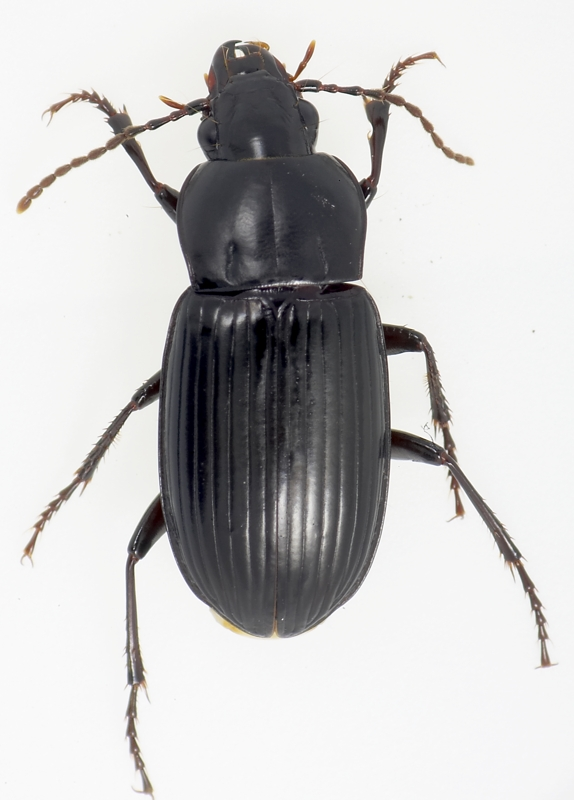
- Melanchiton rectangulus

Scientific classification
- Domain: Eukaryota
- Kingdom: Animalia
- Phylum: Arthropoda
- Class: Insecta
- Order: Coleoptera
- Suborder: Adephaga
- Family: Carabidae
- Subfamily: Licininae
- Tribe: Oodini
- Subtribe: Melanchitonina
- Genus: Melanchiton; Andrewes, 1940

= Melanchiton =

Genus of beetles

Melanchiton is a genus in the beetle family Carabidae. There are more than 50 described species in Melanchiton, found in Africa.

== Species ==
These 53 species belong to the genus Melanchiton:

- Melanchiton abacetoides (Burgeon, 1935)
- Melanchiton aberrans (Chaudoir, 1883)
- Melanchiton aethiops Straneo, 1950
- Melanchiton aterrimus (LaFerté-Sénectère, 1851)
- Melanchiton atratus (Klug, 1833)
- Melanchiton basilewskyi Straneo, 1950
- Melanchiton brevipennis Jeannel, 1948
- Melanchiton burgeoni Straneo, 1950
- Melanchiton camerunus Straneo, 1978
- Melanchiton carbonatus Straneo, 1950
- Melanchiton clarkei Straneo, 1978
- Melanchiton congoensis Straneo, 1950
- Melanchiton decorsei (Alluaud, 1916)
- Melanchiton ebeninus (Erichson, 1843)
- Melanchiton elongatus Straneo, 1950
- Melanchiton guineensis Straneo, 1950
- Melanchiton hulstaerti (Burgeon, 1935)
- Melanchiton impressifrons Straneo, 1950
- Melanchiton intermedius (Péringuey, 1896)
- Melanchiton iridescens (Chaudoir, 1876)
- Melanchiton kenyensis Straneo, 1950
- Melanchiton kivuensis (Burgeon, 1935)
- Melanchiton laevisulcis Straneo, 1950
- Melanchiton latithorax Straneo, 1950
- Melanchiton leleupi Straneo, 1978
- Melanchiton longelytratus Straneo, 1950
- Melanchiton longulus Straneo, 1950
- Melanchiton lucidulus (Boheman, 1848)
- Melanchiton mandibularis (Burgeon, 1935)
- Melanchiton marginatus Straneo, 1950
- Melanchiton mecynonotus (Alluaud, 1916)
- Melanchiton meridionalis Straneo, 1950
- Melanchiton motoensis (Burgeon, 1935)
- Melanchiton nairobianus Straneo, 1950
- Melanchiton niloticus Straneo, 1950
- Melanchiton opacus Straneo, 1950
- Melanchiton orientalis Straneo, 1950
- Melanchiton parallelus (Chaudoir, 1883)
- Melanchiton pinguis Straneo, 1950
- Melanchiton proximoides Straneo, 1950
- Melanchiton proximus (Péringuey, 1926)
- Melanchiton pugnator (Péringuey, 1898)
- Melanchiton quadraticollis Jeannel, 1948
- Melanchiton rectangulus (Chaudoir, 1883)
- Melanchiton rhodesianus Straneo, 1950
- Melanchiton rufipes Straneo, 1978
- Melanchiton senegalensis (Straneo, 1943)
- Melanchiton sjostedti Straneo, 1950
- Melanchiton somalicus (Straneo, 1943)
- Melanchiton transvaalensis Straneo, 1950
- Melanchiton trapezicollis Straneo, 1950
- Melanchiton vorax Straneo, 1968
- Melanchiton zanzibaricus Straneo, 1950
