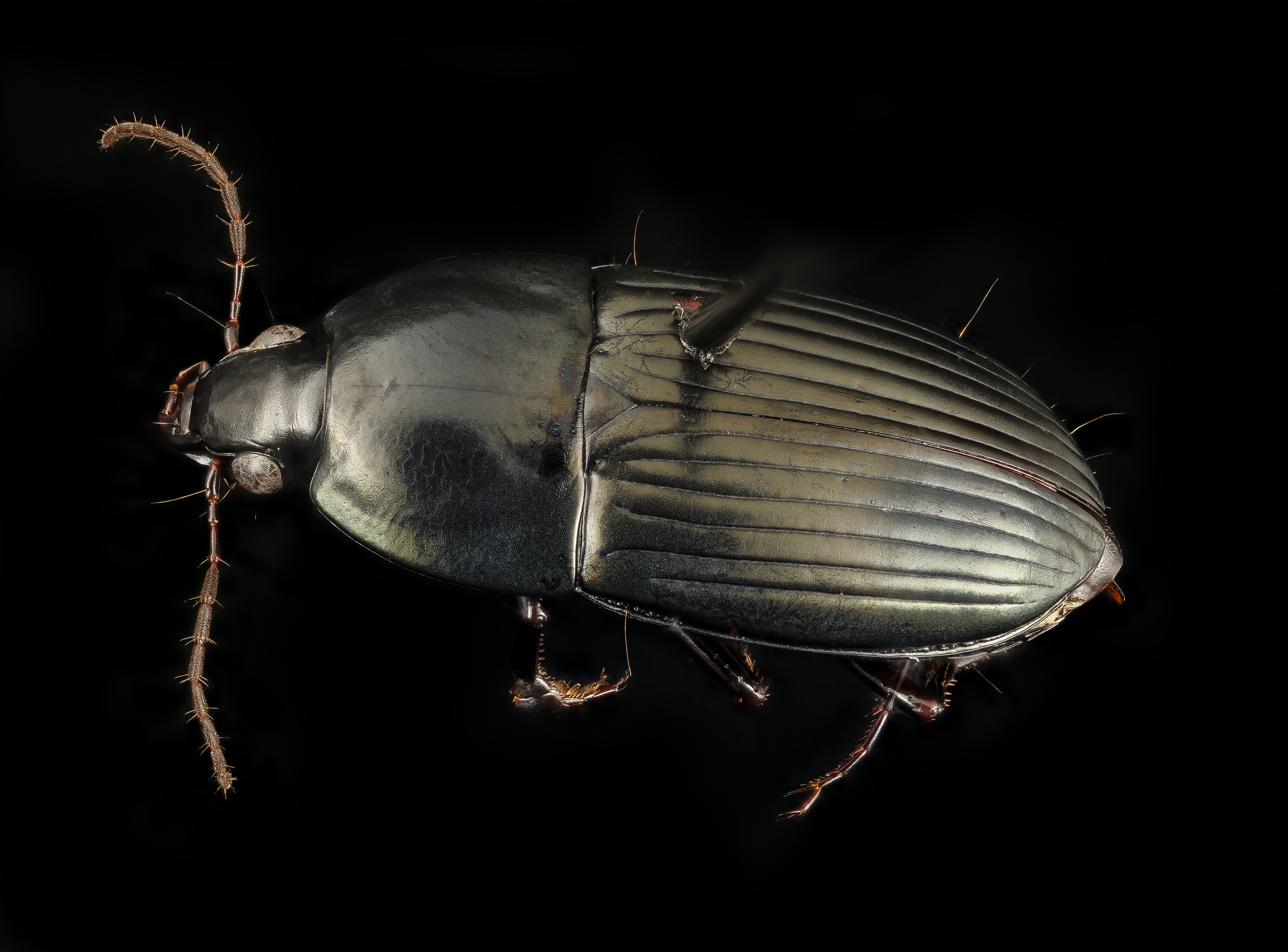

Scientific classification
- Domain: Eukaryota
- Kingdom: Animalia
- Phylum: Arthropoda
- Class: Insecta
- Order: Coleoptera
- Suborder: Adephaga
- Family: Carabidae
- Genus: Stenocrepis
- Species: S. mexicana

Binomial name
- Stenocrepis mexicana (Chevrolat, 1835)

Synonyms
- Oodes mexicanus Chevrolat, 1835b; Oodes picipes LeConte, 1844; Oodes stenocephalus Laferte-Senectere, 1851; Stenocrepis sulcatus Chevrolat, 1835

= Stenocrepis mexicana =

Species of beetle

Stenocrepis elegans is a species of beetle in the family Carabidae. It is found on Cuba and Bahamas as well as in Mexico and the United States.
