= Geobaenus =

Scientific classification
- Kingdom: Animalia
- Phylum: Arthropoda
- Class: Insecta
- Order: Coleoptera
- Suborder: Adephaga
- Family: Carabidae
- Subfamily: Licininae
- Tribe: Oodini
- Subtribe: Geobaenina
- Genus: Geobaenus; Dejean, 1829

Synonyms
- Geoboenus Laporte, 1840

Genus of beetles

Geobaenus is a genus in the ground beetle family Carabidae. There are at least four described species in Geobaenus.

== Species ==
These four species belong to the genus Geobaenus:

- Geobaenus australasiae Guérin-Méneville, 1830 (Australia)
- Geobaenus ingenuus Péringuey, 1896 (South Africa)
- Geobaenus lateralis Dejean, 1829 (South Africa)
- Geobaenus natalensis Basilewsky, 1949 (South Africa)
