= Pseudosphaerodes =

Scientific classification
- Domain: Eukaryota
- Kingdom: Animalia
- Phylum: Arthropoda
- Class: Insecta
- Order: Coleoptera
- Suborder: Adephaga
- Family: Carabidae
- Subfamily: Licininae
- Tribe: Oodini
- Subtribe: Oodina
- Genus: Pseudosphaerodes; Jeannel, 1949

Genus of beetles

Pseudosphaerodes is a genus in the ground beetle family Carabidae. There are at least three described species in Pseudosphaerodes.

== Species ==
These three species belong to the genus Pseudosphaerodes:

- Pseudosphaerodes rhodopus (Bates, 1892) (India, Myanmar)
- Pseudosphaerodes sphaerodoides (Alluaud, 1917) (Cameroon)
- Pseudosphaerodes sulcatus (Eschscholtz, 1833) (Indonesia, Borneo, Philippines)
