= Dercylus =

Scientific classification
- Domain: Eukaryota
- Kingdom: Animalia
- Phylum: Arthropoda
- Class: Insecta
- Order: Coleoptera
- Suborder: Adephaga
- Family: Carabidae
- Subfamily: Licininae
- Tribe: Oodini
- Subtribe: Dercylina
- Genus: Dercylus; Laporte, 1832

Subgenera
- Asporina Laporte, 1834; Dercylus Laporte, 1832; Eurydercylus Moret & Bousquet, 1995; Licinodercylus Kuntzen, 1912

Genus of beetles

Dercylus is a genus in the beetle family Carabidae. There are more than 30 described species in Dercylus, found primarily in Mexico, Central America, and South America.

== Species ==
These 35 species belong to the genus Dercylus:

- Dercylus alternans Kuntzen, 1912 (Colombia and Venezuela)
- Dercylus anthracinus (Dejean, 1831) (Brazil)
- Dercylus ater Laporte, 1832 (Brazil)
- Dercylus batesii Chaudoir, 1861 (Bolivia and Brazil)
- Dercylus bolivianus Kuntzen, 1912 (Bolivia)
- Dercylus buckleyi (Chaudoir, 1883) (Ecuador and Peru)
- Dercylus catenatus Kuntzen, 1912
- Dercylus chaudoiri Kuntzen, 1912 (Brazil)
- Dercylus convexus Kuntzen, 1912 (Brazil)
- Dercylus cordicollis (Chaudoir, 1883) (Colombia and Ecuador)
- Dercylus crenatus Schaum, 1860 (Brazil)
- Dercylus davidsoni Moret in Moret & Bousquet, 1995
- Dercylus franiai Moret in Moret & Bousquet, 1995
- Dercylus gaujoni Moret in Moret & Bousquet, 1995
- Dercylus gautardi Chaudoir, 1869 (Brazil)
- Dercylus gibber Moret in Moret & Bousquet, 1995
- Dercylus gibbosus LaFerté-Sénectère, 1851 (Surinam, French Guiana, and Brazil)
- Dercylus granifer Moret in Moret & Bousquet, 1995 (Ecuador)
- Dercylus heynei Kuntzen, 1912 (Peru)
- Dercylus infernus LaFerté-Sénectère, 1851 (Venezuela and Brazil)
- Dercylus italoi Moret, 1999 (Ecuador)
- Dercylus licinoides (Perty, 1830) (Brazil)
- Dercylus mathani Moret in Moret & Bousquet, 1995
- Dercylus mexicanus Bates, 1891 (Mexico)
- Dercylus nodosus Moret in Moret & Bousquet, 1995
- Dercylus ohausi Kuntzen, 1912 (Brazil)
- Dercylus onorei Moret in Moret & Bousquet, 1995 (Ecuador)
- Dercylus opacus Kuntzen, 1912 (Colombia and Venezuela)
- Dercylus orbiculatus Moret in Moret & Bousquet, 1995 (Ecuador)
- Dercylus praepilatus Moret in Moret & Bousquet, 1995 (Ecuador)
- Dercylus punctatosulcatus Chaudoir, 1869 (Brazil)
- Dercylus puritanus Kuntzen, 1912 (Brazil)
- Dercylus steinbachi Kuntzen, 1912 (Bolivia and Paraguay)
- Dercylus tenebricosus LaFerté-Sénectère, 1851 (French Guiana and Brazil)
- Dercylus tuberculatus (Chaudoir, 1883) (Colombia)
