= Stenocrepis elegans =

Scientific classification
- Domain: Eukaryota
- Kingdom: Animalia
- Phylum: Arthropoda
- Class: Insecta
- Order: Coleoptera
- Suborder: Adephaga
- Family: Carabidae
- Genus: Stenocrepis
- Species: S. elegans

Binomial name
- Stenocrepis elegans (LeConte, 1851)

Synonyms
- Oodes elegans LeConte, 1851

Species of beetle

Stenocrepis elegans is a species of beetle in the family Carabidae. It is found in Mexico and southwestern United States.
