= Thryptocerus =

Scientific classification
- Domain: Eukaryota
- Kingdom: Animalia
- Phylum: Arthropoda
- Class: Insecta
- Order: Coleoptera
- Suborder: Adephaga
- Family: Carabidae
- Subfamily: Licininae
- Tribe: Oodini
- Subtribe: Oodina
- Genus: Thryptocerus; Chaudoir, 1878

Genus of beetles

Thryptocerus is a genus of in the beetle family Carabidae. There are five described species in Thryptocerus, all found in Madagascar.

== Species ==
These five species belong to the genus Thryptocerus:

- Thryptocerus agaboides (Fairmaire, 1869)
- Thryptocerus anthracinus (Brancsik, 1893)
- Thryptocerus ebeninus Basilewsky, 1943
- Thryptocerus perrieri Jeannel, 1949
- Thryptocerus politus Chaudoir, 1878
