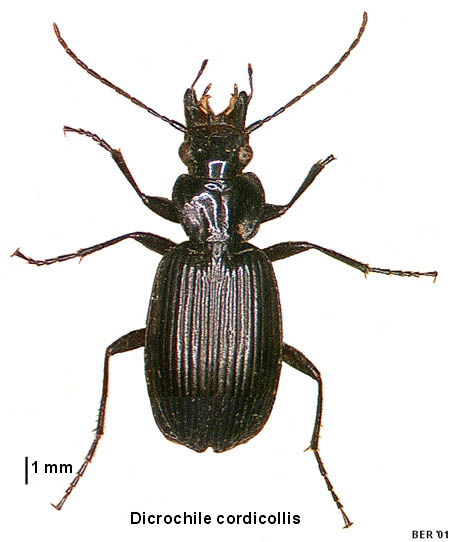
- Dicrochile cordicollis

Scientific classification
- Kingdom: Animalia
- Phylum: Arthropoda
- Class: Insecta
- Order: Coleoptera
- Suborder: Adephaga
- Family: Carabidae
- Subfamily: Licininae
- Genus: Dicrochile; Guerin-Meneville, 1846

= Dicrochile =

Genus of beetles

Dicrochile is a genus of beetles in the family Carabidae, containing the following species:

- Dicrochile artensis Perroud, 1864
- Dicrochile brevicollis (Chaudoir, 1852)
- Dicrochile caledonica, Perroud 1864
- Dicrochile gigas Castelnau, 1867
- Dicrochile goryi (Boisduval, 1835)
- Dicrochile idae Moore, 1985
- Dicrochile minuta Castelnau, 1867
- Dicrochile punctatostriata Castelnau, 1867
- Dicrochile punctipennis Castelnau, 1867
- Dicrochile punctulata Sloane, 1923
- Dicrochile quadricollis Castelnau, 1867
- Dicrochile ventralis Blackburn, 1891
