= Miltodes =

Scientific classification
- Domain: Eukaryota
- Kingdom: Animalia
- Phylum: Arthropoda
- Class: Insecta
- Order: Coleoptera
- Suborder: Adephaga
- Family: Carabidae
- Subfamily: Licininae
- Tribe: Oodini
- Subtribe: Oodina
- Genus: Miltodes; Andrewes, 1922

Genus of beetles

Miltodes is a genus in the ground beetle family Carabidae. There are at least two described species in Miltodes, found in India.

== Species ==
These two species belong to the genus Miltodes:

- Miltodes ellipticus Andrewes, 1937
- Miltodes granum Andrewes, 1922
