= Sphoerodes =

Scientific classification
- Domain: Eukaryota
- Kingdom: Animalia
- Phylum: Arthropoda
- Class: Insecta
- Order: Coleoptera
- Suborder: Adephaga
- Family: Carabidae
- Subfamily: Licininae
- Tribe: Oodini
- Subtribe: Oodina
- Genus: Sphoerodes; Chaudoir, 1883

Synonyms
- Sphaerodes Bates, 1886 (incorrect subsequent spelling)

Genus of beetles

Sphoerodes is a genus of in the beetle family Carabidae. There are at least four described species in Sphoerodes, found in Africa.

== Species ==
These four species belong to the genus Sphoerodes:

- Sphoerodes camerunus Basilewsky, 1951 (Cameroon)
- Sphoerodes gracilior Alluaud, 1917 (Tanzania)
- Sphoerodes impunctatus Bates, 1886 (Democratic Republic of the Congo and Kenya)
- Sphoerodes striatus (Dejean, 1831) (Africa)
