= Evolenes =

Scientific classification
- Kingdom: Animalia
- Phylum: Arthropoda
- Clade: Pancrustacea
- Class: Insecta
- Order: Coleoptera
- Suborder: Adephaga
- Family: Carabidae
- Subfamily: Licininae
- Tribe: Oodini
- Subtribe: Oodina
- Genus: Evolenes; LeConte, 1853
- Species: E. exarata

Binomial name
- Evolenes exarata (Dejean, 1831)

Genus of beetles

Evolenes is a genus in the ground beetle family Carabidae. This genus has a single species, Evolenes exarata, found in the United States.
