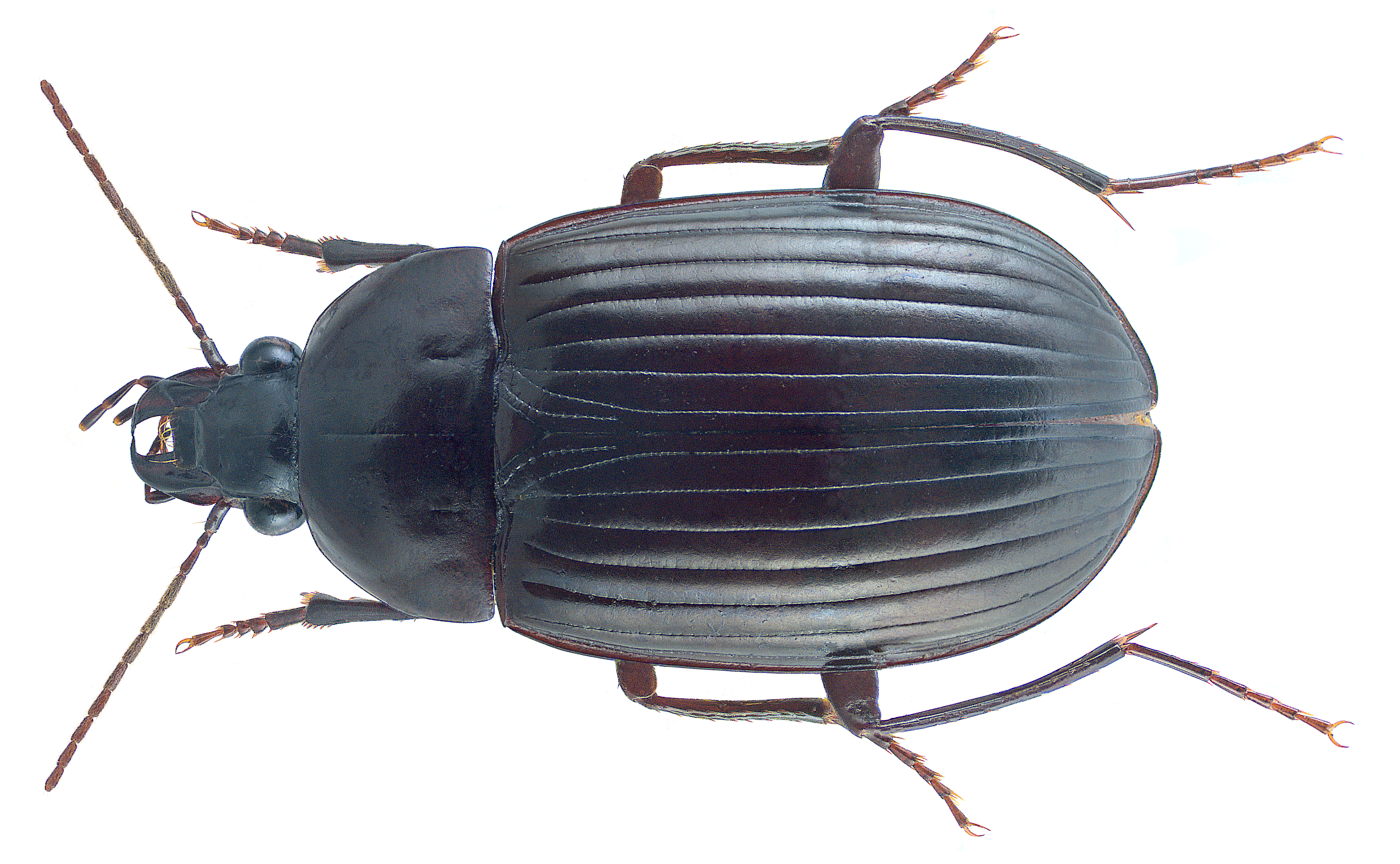
- Brachyodes nigrita

Scientific classification
- Domain: Eukaryota
- Kingdom: Animalia
- Phylum: Arthropoda
- Class: Insecta
- Order: Coleoptera
- Suborder: Adephaga
- Family: Carabidae
- Subfamily: Licininae
- Tribe: Oodini
- Subtribe: Oodina
- Genus: Brachyodes; Jeannel, 1949

= Brachyodes =

Genus of beetles

Brachyodes is a genus in the beetle family Carabidae. There are more than 40 described species in Brachyodes.

== Species ==
These 46 species belong to the genus Brachyodes:

- Brachyodes angustior (Basilewsky, 1956) (Burundi)
- Brachyodes bruneaui Lecordier & Girard, 1990 (Cameroon)
- Brachyodes conspicuus (Péringuey, 1892) (Botswana, Namibia, South Africa)
- Brachyodes convergens (Fairmaire, 1887)
- Brachyodes coruscus Lecordier & Girard, 1990 (Cameroon)
- Brachyodes deplanatus (Chaudoir, 1882) (Madagascar)
- Brachyodes ellipticus (LaFerté-Sénectère, 1851)
- Brachyodes guineensis (Chaudoir, 1882) (Africa)
- Brachyodes hydrophiloides (Basilewsky, 1946) (Madagascar)
- Brachyodes incisus Lecordier & Girard, 1990 (Cameroon)
- Brachyodes labrosus Lecordier, 1990 (Democratic Republic of the Congo and Burundi)
- Brachyodes laticollis Lecordier & Girard, 1990 (Cameroon)
- Brachyodes laxus Lecordier & Girard, 1990 (Cameroon)
- Brachyodes leopoldi (Burgeon, 1935) (Democratic Republic of the Congo)
- Brachyodes longipalpis Lecordier, 1990 (Africa)
- Brachyodes lucidus (Gerstaecker, 1867)
- Brachyodes madagascariensis (Chaudoir, 1857) (Madagascar)
- Brachyodes metallescens Basilewsky, 1977 (Madagascar)
- Brachyodes mirei Lecordier & Girard, 1990 (Cameroon)
- Brachyodes natalensis (Chaudoir, 1882) (Africa)
- Brachyodes nigrita (Chaudoir, 1843) (Senegal/Gambia and Chad)
- Brachyodes obscuripes Lecordier & Girard, 1990 (Cameroon)
- Brachyodes peguensis (Bates, 1892) (Japan and Myanmar)
- Brachyodes pervulgatus Lecordier & Girard, 1990 (Cameroon)
- Brachyodes plumbeus (Basilewsky, 1949) (Mali)
- Brachyodes porrectus Lecordier & Girard, 1990 (Cameroon)
- Brachyodes praetextus Lecordier & Girard, 1990 (Cameroon)
- Brachyodes prasinus (Alluaud, 1917) (Madagascar)
- Brachyodes pseudoguineensis Lecordier, 1990 (Democratic Republic of the Congo and Burundi)
- Brachyodes pseudomirei Lecordier & Girard, 1990 (Cameroon)
- Brachyodes rubiginosus Lecordier & Girard, 1990 (Cameroon)
- Brachyodes rufipes (Gory, 1833) (Burkina Faso and Democratic Republic of the Congo)
- Brachyodes rufithorax Lecordier & Girard, 1990 (Cameroon)
- Brachyodes semicinctus Lecordier & Girard, 1990 (Cameroon)
- Brachyodes senegalensis (Dejean, 1831) (Africa)
- Brachyodes siamensis (Chaudoir, 1882) (Southeast Asia)
- Brachyodes similatus (Boheman, 1848) (Africa)
- Brachyodes straneoi (Basilewsky, 1949) (Somalia)
- Brachyodes subaeneus (Dejean, 1831) (Mauretania and Senegal/Gambia)
- Brachyodes submetallicus (Chaudoir, 1857) (Senegal/Gambia, Guinea, Mali)
- Brachyodes subolivaceus (LaFerté-Sénectère, 1851) (Nepal, Sri Lanka, India)
- Brachyodes tenuistriatus Lecordier, 1990 (Democratic Republic of the Congo)
- Brachyodes tristis (Gemminger & Harold, 1868) (Nigeria)
- Brachyodes vagabundus (Chaudoir, 1878) (Ivory Coast and Democratic Republic of the Congo)
- Brachyodes virens (Wiedemann, 1823) (Japan, Indomalaya)
- Brachyodes vulsus (Darlington, 1968) (Indonesia and New Guinea)
