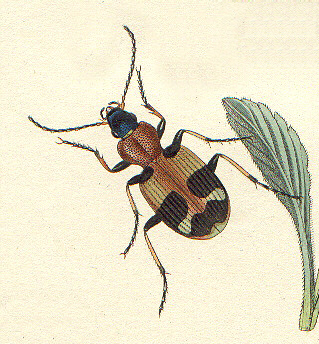
- Illustration of Callistus lunatus

Scientific classification
- Domain: Eukaryota
- Kingdom: Animalia
- Phylum: Arthropoda
- Class: Insecta
- Order: Coleoptera
- Suborder: Adephaga
- Family: Carabidae
- Subfamily: Licininae
- Genus: Callistus; Bonelli, 1810

Species
- Callistus gratiosus; Callistus lunatus; Callistus syriacus

= Callistus (beetle) =

Genus of beetles

Callistus is a genus of ground beetle in the subfamily Licininae.
