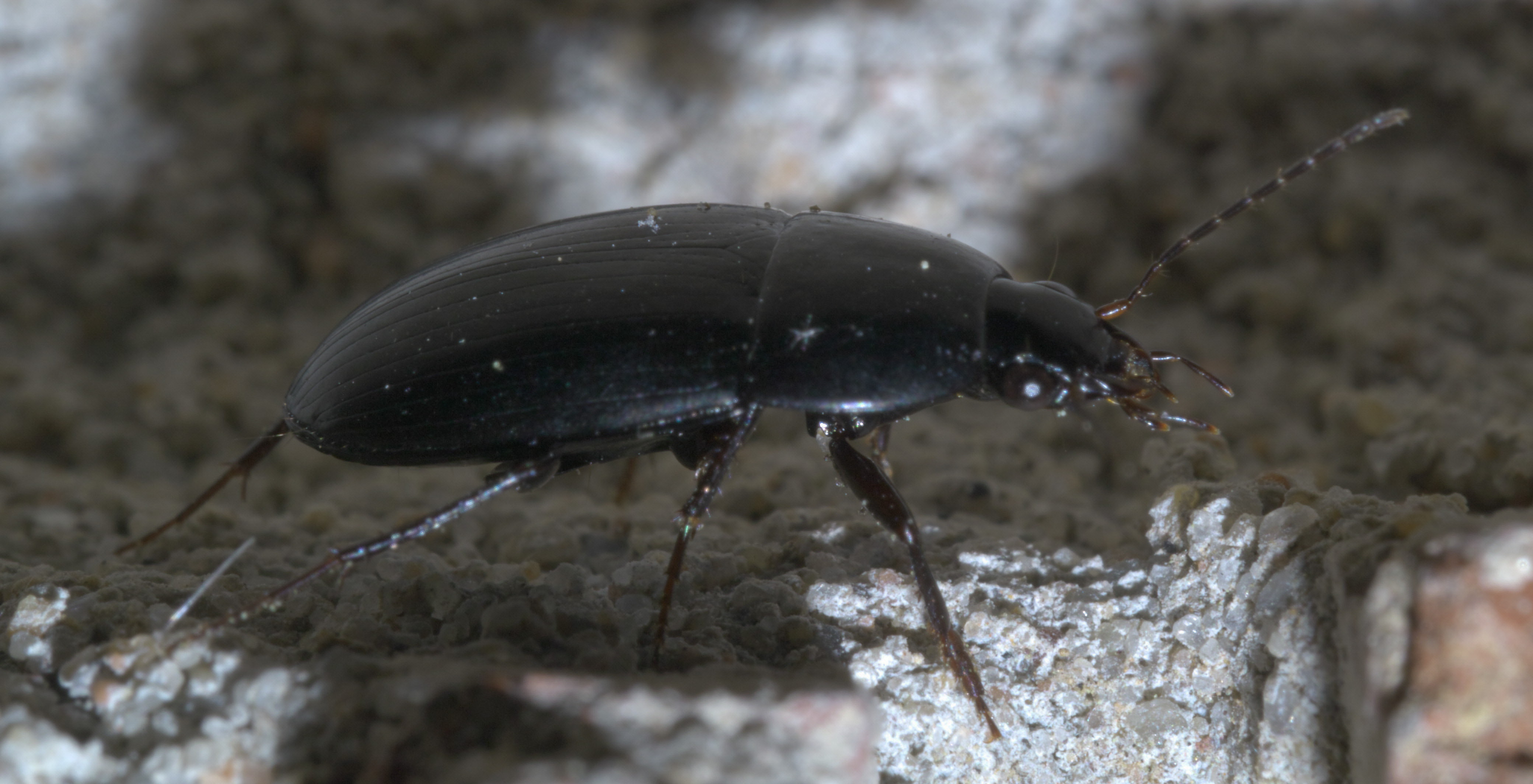

Scientific classification
- Kingdom: Animalia
- Phylum: Arthropoda
- Class: Insecta
- Order: Coleoptera
- Suborder: Adephaga
- Family: Carabidae
- Genus: Oodes
- Species: O. amaroides

Binomial name
- Oodes amaroides Dejean, 1831

= Oodes amaroides =

Species of beetle

Oodes amaroides is a species of ground beetle in the family Carabidae. It is found in North America.

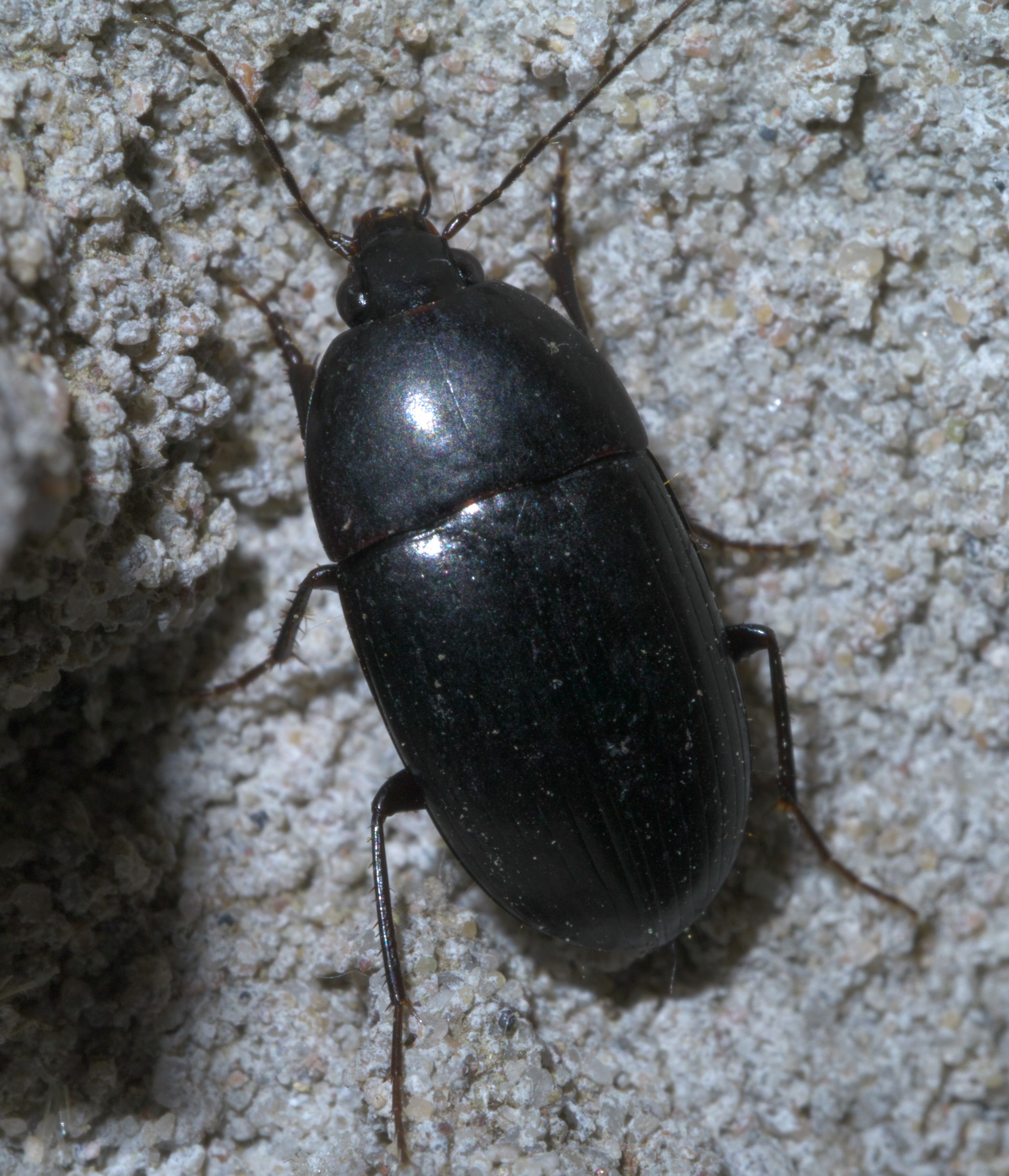
