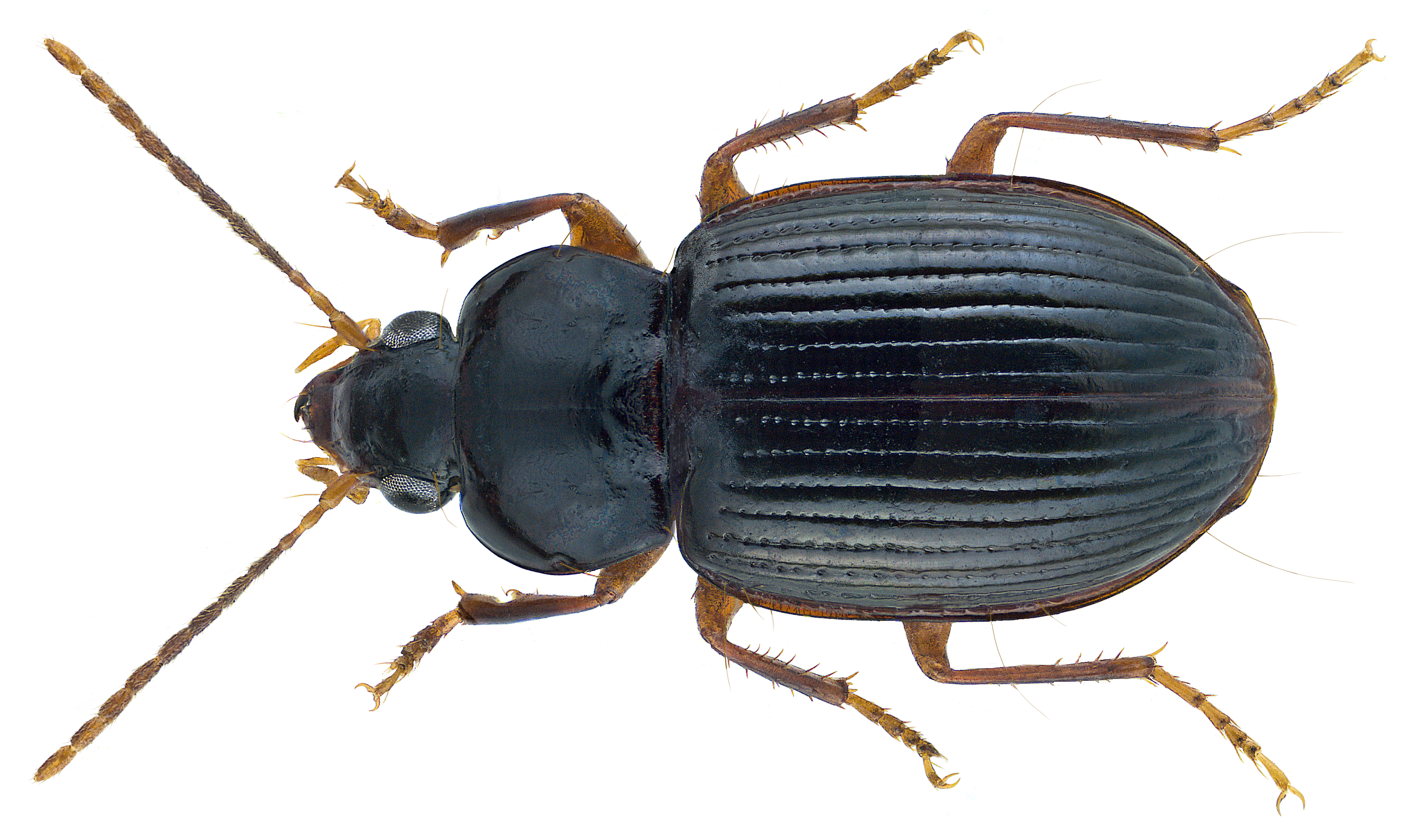

Scientific classification
- Domain: Eukaryota
- Kingdom: Animalia
- Phylum: Arthropoda
- Class: Insecta
- Order: Coleoptera
- Suborder: Adephaga
- Family: Carabidae
- Subfamily: Licininae
- Tribe: Oodini
- Subtribe: Melanchitonina
- Genus: Melanchrous; Andrewes, 1940

= Melanchrous =

Genus of beetles

Melanchrous is a genus in the beetle family Carabidae. There are about five described species in Melanchrous.

== Species ==
These five species belong to the genus Melanchrous:

- Melanchrous africanus (Straneo, 1940) (Democratic Republic of the Congo)
- Melanchrous celisi Straneo, 1962 (Democratic Republic of the Congo)
- Melanchrous flavipes (Motschulsky, 1866) (Myanmar)
- Melanchrous florens (Andrewes, 1929) (Indonesia)
- Melanchrous obesus (Andrewes, 1938) (Indonesia)
