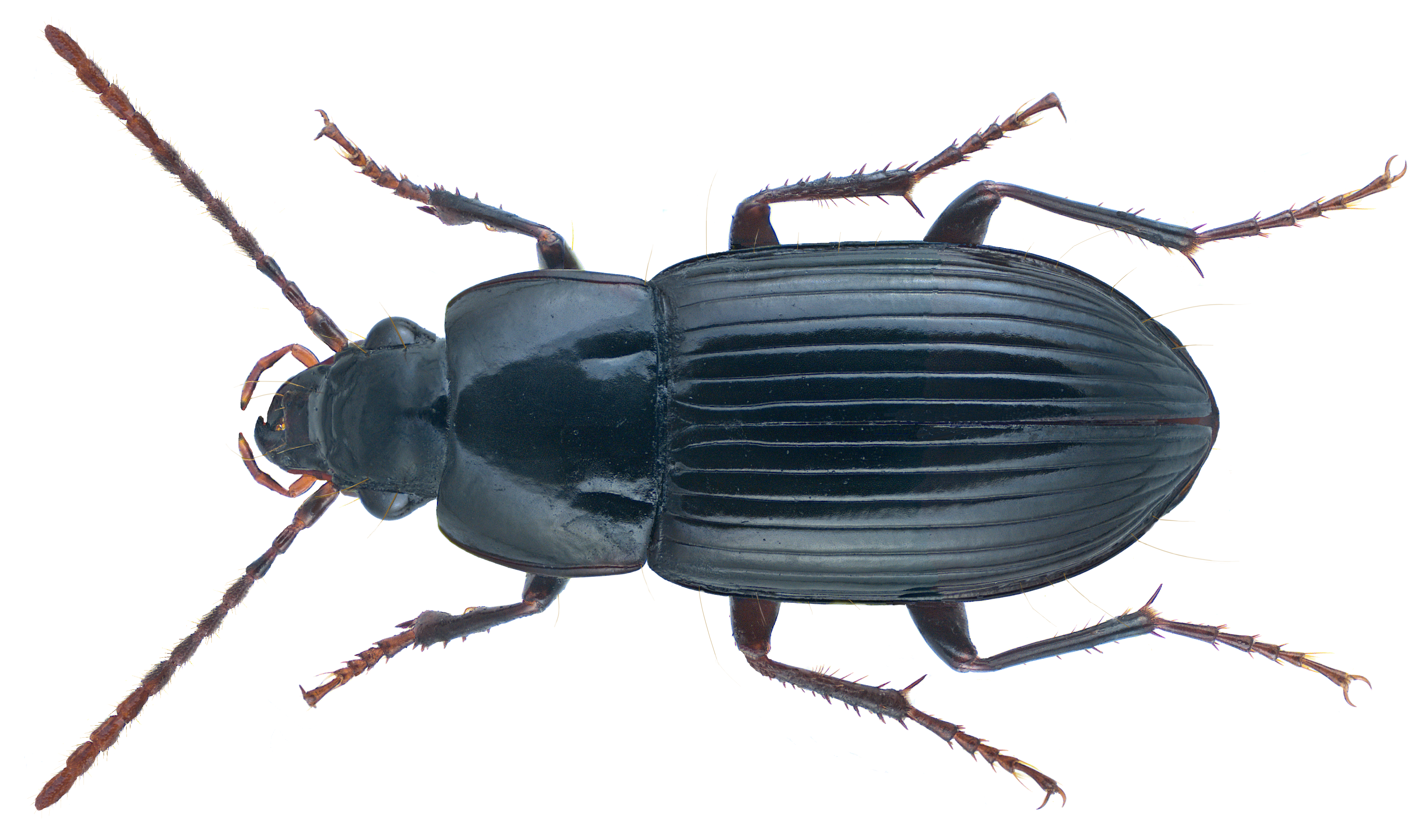
- Dicaelindus felspaticus

Scientific classification
- Domain: Eukaryota
- Kingdom: Animalia
- Phylum: Arthropoda
- Class: Insecta
- Order: Coleoptera
- Suborder: Adephaga
- Family: Carabidae
- Subfamily: Licininae
- Tribe: Oodini
- Subtribe: Melanchitonina
- Genus: Dicaelindus; W.S.MacLeay, 1825

= Dicaelindus =

Genus of beetles

Dicaelindus is a genus in the beetle family Carabidae. There are about 11 described species in Dicaelindus.

== Species ==
These 11 species belong to the genus Dicaelindus:

- Dicaelindus collinus Andrewes, 1931 (Indonesia and Borneo)
- Dicaelindus felspaticus W.S.MacLeay, 1825 (Indomalaya)
- Dicaelindus impunctatus (Bates, 1886) (Sri Lanka)
- Dicaelindus laevis Straneo, 1992 (Vietnam)
- Dicaelindus laticollis Straneo, 1992 (India)
- Dicaelindus longimalis Andrewes, 1937 (Indonesia)
- Dicaelindus marginatus Straneo, 1972
- Dicaelindus nitescens (Tschitscherine, 1900) (Indonesia and Borneo)
- Dicaelindus omestes Andrewes, 1933 (Indonesia)
- Dicaelindus pernitidus (Chaudoir, 1883) (Bangladesh, India, and Myanmar)
- Dicaelindus ryukyuensis Habu, 1978 (Japan)
