= Orthocerodus =

Scientific classification
- Domain: Eukaryota
- Kingdom: Animalia
- Phylum: Arthropoda
- Class: Insecta
- Order: Coleoptera
- Suborder: Adephaga
- Family: Carabidae
- Subfamily: Licininae
- Tribe: Oodini
- Subtribe: Oodina
- Genus: Orthocerodus; Basilewsky, 1946

Genus of beetles

Orthocerodus is a genus in the ground beetle family Carabidae. There are about five described species in Orthocerodus, found in Madagascar.

== Species ==
These five species belong to the genus Orthocerodus:

- Orthocerodus atronitens (Fairmaire, 1892)
- Orthocerodus longicollis Jeannel, 1949
- Orthocerodus mirabilis Basilewsky, 1946
- Orthocerodus parallelus Jeannel, 1949
- Orthocerodus punctisternis Basilewsky, 1977
