= Lonchosternus =

Scientific classification
- Kingdom: Animalia
- Phylum: Arthropoda
- Class: Insecta
- Order: Coleoptera
- Suborder: Adephaga
- Family: Carabidae
- Subfamily: Licininae
- Tribe: Oodini
- Subtribe: Oodina
- Genus: Lonchosternus; LaFerté-Sénectère, 1851

Genus of beetles

Lonchosternus is a genus in the beetle family Carabidae. There are more than 20 described species in Lonchosternus found mainly in Africa, but also on the Iberian Peninsula.

== Species ==
These 23 species belong to the genus Lonchosternus:

- Lonchosternus aethiopicus Lecordier, 1991
- Lonchosternus alluaudi Jeannel, 1949
- Lonchosternus alutaceus Lecordier, 1991
- Lonchosternus angolensis (Erichson, 1843)
- Lonchosternus contractus Lecordier & Girard, 1988
- Lonchosternus dubius Lecordier & Girard, 1988
- Lonchosternus girardi Lecordier, 1991
- Lonchosternus hispanicus (Dejean, 1826)
- Lonchosternus innominatus Lecordier & Girard, 1988
- Lonchosternus labrosus Lecordier, 1991
- Lonchosternus mauritanicus (Lucas, 1846)
- Lonchosternus mirei Lecordier & Girard, 1988
- Lonchosternus nitidus Jeannel, 1949
- Lonchosternus politus (Gory, 1833)
- Lonchosternus prolixus Lecordier & Girard, 1988
- Lonchosternus robustus Lecordier & Girard, 1988
- Lonchosternus scrupulosus Lecordier & Girard, 1988
- Lonchosternus semistriatus (Dejean, 1831)
- Lonchosternus sublaevis (Reiche, 1850)
- Lonchosternus substriatus (Chaudoir, 1882)
- Lonchosternus thoracicus Lecordier, 1991
- Lonchosternus trapezicollis Fairmaire, 1903
- Lonchosternus valdestriatus Lecordier, 1991
