= Dercylus cordicollis =

Scientific classification
- Kingdom: Animalia
- Phylum: Arthropoda
- Class: Insecta
- Order: Coleoptera
- Suborder: Adephaga
- Family: Carabidae
- Genus: Dercylus
- Species: D. cordicollis

Binomial name
- Dercylus cordicollis (Chaudoir, 1883)

Species of beetle

Dercylus cordicollis is a species of beetles in the family Carabidae, native to Ecuador
