= Hoplolenus =

Scientific classification
- Kingdom: Animalia
- Phylum: Arthropoda
- Class: Insecta
- Order: Coleoptera
- Suborder: Adephaga
- Family: Carabidae
- Subfamily: Licininae
- Tribe: Oodini
- Subtribe: Oodina
- Genus: Hoplolenus; LaFerté-Sénectère, 1851

Genus of beetles

Hoplolenus is a genus in the beetle family Carabidae. There are at least three described species in Hoplolenus, found in Africa.

== Species ==
These three species belong to the genus Hoplolenus:

- Hoplolenus congoensis Basilewsky, 1949
- Hoplolenus insignis LaFerté-Sénectère, 1851
- Hoplolenus obesus (Murray, 1858)
