= Oodes fluvialis =

Scientific classification
- Domain: Eukaryota
- Kingdom: Animalia
- Phylum: Arthropoda
- Class: Insecta
- Order: Coleoptera
- Suborder: Adephaga
- Family: Carabidae
- Genus: Oodes
- Species: O. fluvialis

Binomial name
- Oodes fluvialis LeConte, 1863

Species of beetle

Oodes fluvialis is a species of ground beetle in the family Carabidae. It is found in North America.
