= Anatrichis oblonga =

Scientific classification
- Domain: Eukaryota
- Kingdom: Animalia
- Phylum: Arthropoda
- Class: Insecta
- Order: Coleoptera
- Suborder: Adephaga
- Family: Carabidae
- Genus: Anatrichis
- Species: A. oblonga

Binomial name
- Anatrichis oblonga G. Horn, 1891

Species of beetle

Anatrichis oblonga is a species of ground beetle in the family Carabidae. It is found in the Caribbean Sea, Central America, and North America.
