= Polychaetus =

Scientific classification
- Kingdom: Animalia
- Phylum: Arthropoda
- Clade: Pancrustacea
- Class: Insecta
- Order: Coleoptera
- Suborder: Adephaga
- Family: Carabidae
- Subfamily: Licininae
- Tribe: Oodini
- Subtribe: Oodina
- Genus: Polychaetus; Chaudoir, 1882

Genus of beetles

Polychaetus is a genus in the ground beetle family Carabidae. There are at least two described species in Polychaetus.

== Species ==
These two species belong to the genus Polychaetus:

- Polychaetus dejeani Chaudoir, 1882 (Mexico)
- Polychaetus egregius (Chaudoir, 1854) (French Guiana)
