= Sphaerodinus =

Scientific classification
- Domain: Eukaryota
- Kingdom: Animalia
- Phylum: Arthropoda
- Class: Insecta
- Order: Coleoptera
- Suborder: Adephaga
- Family: Carabidae
- Subfamily: Licininae
- Tribe: Oodini
- Subtribe: Oodina
- Genus: Sphaerodinus; Jeannel, 1949

Genus of beetles

Sphaerodinus is a genus in the ground beetle family Carabidae. There are at least two described species in Sphaerodinus, found in Madagascar.

== Species ==
These two species belong to the genus Sphaerodinus:

- Sphaerodinus goudoti Jeannel, 1949
- Sphaerodinus pauliani Basilewsky, 1977
