= Protopidius =

Scientific classification
- Domain: Eukaryota
- Kingdom: Animalia
- Phylum: Arthropoda
- Class: Insecta
- Order: Coleoptera
- Suborder: Adephaga
- Family: Carabidae
- Subfamily: Licininae
- Tribe: Oodini
- Subtribe: Oodina
- Genus: Protopidius; Basilewsky, 1949

Genus of beetles

Protopidius is a genus in the ground beetle family Carabidae. There are about five described species in Protopidius.

== Species ==
These five species belong to the genus Protopidius:

- Protopidius brevis Lecordier, 1990 (DR Congo)
- Protopidius bruneaui Lecordier & Girard, 1987 (Cameroon)
- Protopidius congoanus Basilewsky, 1949 (Guinea, DR Congo, Rwanda, Burundi)
- Protopidius obesus Lecordier & Girard, 1987 (Cameroon)
- Protopidius strictus Lecordier, 1990 (Ethiopia)
