= Prionognathus =

Scientific classification
- Kingdom: Animalia
- Phylum: Arthropoda
- Class: Insecta
- Order: Coleoptera
- Suborder: Adephaga
- Family: Carabidae
- Subfamily: Licininae
- Tribe: Oodini
- Subtribe: Oodina
- Genus: Prionognathus; LaFerté-Sénectère, 1851

Genus of beetles

Prionognathus is a genus in the ground beetle family Carabidae. There are at least two described species in Prionognathus.

== Species ==
These two species belong to the genus Prionognathus:

- Prionognathus fossor LaFerté-Sénectère, 1851 (Senegal/Gambia, Guinea-Bissau, DR Congo)
- Prionognathus overlaeti (Burgeon, 1935) (DR Congo)
