= Camptotoma =

Scientific classification
- Domain: Eukaryota
- Kingdom: Animalia
- Phylum: Arthropoda
- Class: Insecta
- Order: Coleoptera
- Suborder: Adephaga
- Family: Carabidae
- Subfamily: Licininae
- Tribe: Chaetogenyini
- Genus: Camptotoma; Reiche, 1843

Subgenera
- Camptotoma Reiche, 1843; Chaetogenys Emden, 1958

Synonyms
- Chaetogenys

Genus of beetles

Camptotoma is a genus of ground beetles in the family Carabidae. There are five described species in Camptotoma, found in South America.

Camptotoma is the sole genus in the subfamily Chaetogenyini.

== Species ==
These five species belong to the genus Camptotoma:

- Camptotoma flavostriata Reichardt, 1967 (Brazil)
- Camptotoma freyi Nègre, 1966 (Venezuela)
- Camptotoma lebasii Reiche, 1843 (Colombia)
- Camptotoma marcuzzii Nègre, 1966 (Venezuela)
- Camptotoma straneoi (Emden, 1958) (Brazil and Paraguay)
