= Systolocranius =

Scientific classification
- Kingdom: Animalia
- Phylum: Arthropoda
- Clade: Pancrustacea
- Class: Insecta
- Order: Coleoptera
- Suborder: Adephaga
- Family: Carabidae
- Subfamily: Licininae
- Tribe: Oodini
- Subtribe: Oodina
- Genus: Systolocranius; Chaudoir, 1857

Synonyms
- Chaetosystolus Basilewsky, 1949; Losystocranius Basilewsky, 1949; Systolus Basilewsky, 1949

Genus of beetles

Systolocranius is a genus in the ground beetle family Carabidae. There are more than 20 described species in Systolocranius, found in Africa, India, and Bangladesh.

== Species ==
These 28 species belong to the genus Systolocranius:

- Systolocranius alternans Chaudoir, 1882 (Mozambique, South Africa)
- Systolocranius ampliolatus Péringuey, 1926 (Mozambique, Zimbabwe)
- Systolocranius brachymorphus Chaudoir, 1882 (Senegal/Gambia)
- Systolocranius brachypterus Basilewsky, 1949 (Central African Republic)
- Systolocranius carinatus Lecordier, 1972 (Kenya)
- Systolocranius centralis Lecordier, 1972 (DR Congo)
- Systolocranius curtus Basilewsky, 1949 (Tanzania, Mozambique)
- Systolocranius depressus Alluaud, 1923 (Somalia)
- Systolocranius discrepans Péringuey, 1908 (Zimbabwe)
- Systolocranius elongatus Chaudoir, 1882 (Uganda, Tanzania, Malawi, Mozambique, Zimbabwe)
- Systolocranius giganteus (Chaudoir, 1854) (Senegal/Gambia, South Africa)
- Systolocranius girardi Lecordier, 1972 (Ivory Coast)
- Systolocranius goryi (Gory, 1833) (Africa)
- Systolocranius ingens Alluaud, 1934 (DR Congo)
- Systolocranius linea (Wiedemann, 1821) (Bangladesh, India)
- Systolocranius lucidulus Chaudoir, 1882 (Somalia, Tanzania)
- Systolocranius luvungiensis Burgeon, 1935 (DR Congo)
- Systolocranius mandibularis Basilewsky, 1948 (Benin)
- Systolocranius parumpunctatus Lecordier, 1972 (DR Congo)
- Systolocranius perrieri (Fairmaire, 1903) (Madagascar)
- Systolocranius protenius Basilewsky, 1949 (Tanzania)
- Systolocranius ruandanus Lecordier, 1972 (Rwanda)
- Systolocranius senegalensis Gemminger & Harold, 1868 (Senegal/Gambia, Guinea, Sierra Leone, Liberia, Ivory Coast, DR Congo)
- Systolocranius sulcipennis Chaudoir, 1882 (Africa)
- Systolocranius tibialis Lecordier, 1972 (Angola)
- Systolocranius uelensis Burgeon, 1935 (Senegal/Gambia, Guinea-Bissau, Ivory Coast, Cameroon, DR Congo)
- Systolocranius valens Lecordier, 1986 (Ivory Coast, DR Congo)
- Systolocranius zavattarii G.Müller, 1941 (Ethiopia)
