= Adelopomorpha =

Scientific classification
- Kingdom: Animalia
- Phylum: Arthropoda
- Clade: Pancrustacea
- Class: Insecta
- Order: Coleoptera
- Suborder: Adephaga
- Family: Carabidae
- Subfamily: Licininae
- Tribe: Oodini
- Subtribe: Oodina
- Genus: Adelopomorpha; Heller, 1916

Genus of beetles

Adelopomorpha is a genus in the beetle family Carabidae. There are at least three described species in Adelopomorpha, found in New Caledonia.

== Species ==
These three species belong to the genus Adelopomorpha:

- Adelopomorpha glabra Heller, 1916
- Adelopomorpha tethys Will & B.Gueorguiev, 2021
- Adelopomorpha tuberculata Will & B.Gueorguiev, 2021
