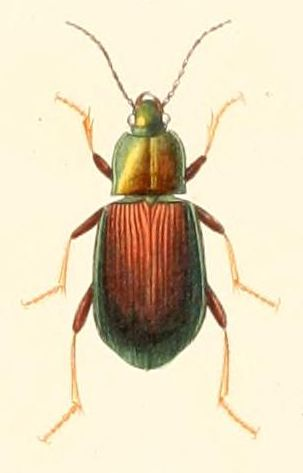

Scientific classification
- Domain: Eukaryota
- Kingdom: Animalia
- Phylum: Arthropoda
- Class: Insecta
- Order: Coleoptera
- Suborder: Adephaga
- Family: Carabidae
- Genus: Stenocrepis
- Species: S. tibialis

Binomial name
- Stenocrepis tibialis (Chevrolat, 1834)

Synonyms
- Oodes femoralis Chaudoir, 1835; Oodes pallipes Brullé, 1836; Oodes chlorophanus Erichson, 1847

= Stenocrepis tibialis =

Species of beetle

Stenocrepis tibialis is a species of beetle in the family Carabidae. It is found in the Caribbean, Argentina, Brazil, Guatemala, Ecuador, Mexico, and the U.S. state of Texas.
