= Ectenognathus =

Scientific classification
- Domain: Eukaryota
- Kingdom: Animalia
- Phylum: Arthropoda
- Class: Insecta
- Order: Coleoptera
- Suborder: Adephaga
- Family: Carabidae
- Subfamily: Harpalinae
- Tribe: Chlaeniini
- Subtribe: Chlaeniina
- Genus: Ectenognathus; Murray, 1858
- Species: E. dryptoides

Binomial name
- Ectenognathus dryptoides Murray, 1858

Genus of beetles

Ectenognathus is a genus in the ground beetle family Carabidae. This genus has a single species, Ectenognathus dryptoides. It is found in the African countries Guinea, Ivory Coast, Togo, and Nigeria.
