= Chaetocrepis =

Scientific classification
- Domain: Eukaryota
- Kingdom: Animalia
- Phylum: Arthropoda
- Class: Insecta
- Order: Coleoptera
- Suborder: Adephaga
- Family: Carabidae
- Tribe: Oodini
- Subtribe: Oodina
- Genus: Chaetocrepis; Chaudoir, 1857
- Species: C. besckii

Binomial name
- Chaetocrepis besckii Chaudoir, 1857

Genus of beetles

Chaetocrepis is a genus in the ground beetle family Carabidae. This genus has a single species, Chaetocrepis besckii. It is found in Brazil.
