= Actodus =

Scientific classification
- Kingdom: Animalia
- Phylum: Arthropoda
- Class: Insecta
- Order: Coleoptera
- Suborder: Adephaga
- Family: Carabidae
- Subfamily: Licininae
- Genus: Actodus; Alluaud, 1915

Genus of beetles

Actodus is a genus of beetles in the family Carabidae, containing the following species:

- Actodus longeantennatus Lecordier, 1966
- Actodus treichi Alluaud, 1915
