= Hololeius =

Scientific classification
- Kingdom: Animalia
- Phylum: Arthropoda
- Class: Insecta
- Order: Coleoptera
- Suborder: Adephaga
- Family: Carabidae
- Tribe: Chlaeniini
- Subtribe: Chlaeniina
- Genus: Hololeius; LaFerté-Sénectère, 1851
- Species: H. ceylanicus

Binomial name
- Hololeius ceylanicus (Nietner, 1856)

Genus of beetles

Hololeius ceylanicus is a species of beetles in the family Carabidae, the only species in the genus Hololeius.
