= Neoodes =

Scientific classification
- Domain: Eukaryota
- Kingdom: Animalia
- Phylum: Arthropoda
- Class: Insecta
- Order: Coleoptera
- Suborder: Adephaga
- Family: Carabidae
- Tribe: Oodini
- Subtribe: Oodina
- Genus: Neoodes; Basilewsky, 1953
- Species: N. tazieffi

Binomial name
- Neoodes tazieffi (Basilewsky, 1948)

Genus of beetles

Neoodes is a genus in the ground beetle family Carabidae. This genus has a single species, Neoodes tazieffi. It is found in the Democratic Republic of the Congo.
