= Stuhlmannium =

Scientific classification
- Domain: Eukaryota
- Kingdom: Animalia
- Phylum: Arthropoda
- Class: Insecta
- Order: Coleoptera
- Suborder: Adephaga
- Family: Carabidae
- Subfamily: Harpalinae
- Tribe: Chlaeniini
- Subtribe: Chlaeniina
- Genus: Stuhlmannium; Kolbe, 1894
- Species: S. mirabile

Binomial name
- Stuhlmannium mirabile Kolbe, 1894

Synonyms
- Eustuhlmannium Kolbe, 1897

Genus of beetles

Stuhlmannium is a genus in the ground beetle family Carabidae. This genus has a single species, Stuhlmannium mirabile. It is found in the Democratic Republic of the Congo, Uganda, Burundi, and Tanzania.
