= Harpaglossus =

Scientific classification
- Kingdom: Animalia
- Phylum: Arthropoda
- Class: Insecta
- Order: Coleoptera
- Suborder: Adephaga
- Family: Carabidae
- Subfamily: Harpalinae
- Tribe: Chlaeniini
- Subtribe: Chlaeniina
- Genus: Harpaglossus; Motschulsky, 1858

Synonyms
- Ceroglossus Chaudoir, 1856; Penthimus Gemminger & Harold, 1868

Genus of beetles

Harpaglossus is a genus of carabids in the beetle family Carabidae. There are at least four described species in Harpaglossus, found in Africa and Asia.

== Species ==
These four species belong to the genus Harpaglossus:

- Harpaglossus laevigatus (Dejean, 1828) (Mauretania, Senegal/Gambia, Sudan)
- Harpaglossus obscurus (Chaudoir, 1857) (Egypt, India)
- Harpaglossus opacus (Chaudoir, 1857) (Sri Lanka, India)
- Harpaglossus politus (Chaudoir, 1857) (Mauretania, Niger, Chad)
