= Acanthoodes =

Acanthoodes centrosternis

Scientific classification
- Kingdom: Animalia
- Phylum: Arthropoda
- Class: Insecta
- Order: Coleoptera
- Suborder: Adephaga
- Family: Carabidae
- Subfamily: Licininae
- Genus: Acanthoodes; Basilewsky, 1953
- Species: A. centrosternis

Binomial name
- Acanthoodes centrosternis (Chaudoir, 1882)

Genus of beetles

Acanthoodes centrosternis is a species of beetles in the family Carabidae, the only species in the genus Acanthoodes.
