= Stenoodes =

Scientific classification
- Domain: Eukaryota
- Kingdom: Animalia
- Phylum: Arthropoda
- Class: Insecta
- Order: Coleoptera
- Suborder: Adephaga
- Family: Carabidae
- Subfamily: Harpalinae
- Tribe: Chlaeniini
- Subtribe: Chlaeniina
- Genus: Stenoodes; Basilewsky, 1953
- Species: S. jeanneli

Binomial name
- Stenoodes jeanneli Basilewsky, 1953

Genus of beetles

Stenoodes is a genus in the ground beetle family Carabidae. This genus has a single species, Stenoodes jeanneli. It is found in Madagascar.
