= Holosoma =

Scientific classification
- Domain: Eukaryota
- Kingdom: Animalia
- Phylum: Arthropoda
- Class: Insecta
- Order: Coleoptera
- Suborder: Adephaga
- Family: Carabidae
- Subfamily: Harpalinae
- Tribe: Chlaeniini
- Subtribe: Chlaeniina
- Genus: Holosoma; Semenov, 1889

Genus of beetles

Holosoma is a genus of ground beetles in the family Carabidae. There are 11 described species in Holosoma, 10 found in China and 1 from the Philippines.

== Species ==
These 11 species belong to the genus Holosoma:

- Holosoma boettcheri Jedlicka, 1936 (Philippines)
- Holosoma hedini (Andrewes, 1935) (China)
- Holosoma heros Kirschenhofer, 1995 (China)
- Holosoma imurai N.Ito, 2003 (China)
- Holosoma misaoae N.Ito, 2012 (China)
- Holosoma namikoae N.Ito, 2012 (China)
- Holosoma nigritum N.Ito, 2003 (China)
- Holosoma opacum Semenov, 1889 (China)
- Holosoma sciakyi Kirschenhofer, 1995 (China)
- Holosoma speciosum N.Ito, 2003 (China)
- Holosoma weigoldi (Heller, 1923) (China)
