= Megaloodes =

Scientific classification
- Domain: Eukaryota
- Kingdom: Animalia
- Phylum: Arthropoda
- Class: Insecta
- Order: Coleoptera
- Suborder: Adephaga
- Family: Carabidae
- Tribe: Oodini
- Subtribe: Oodina
- Genus: Megaloodes; Lesne, 1896
- Species: M. politus

Binomial name
- Megaloodes politus Lesne, 1896

Synonyms
- Megalodes Lesne, 1896

Genus of beetles

Megaloodes is a genus in the ground beetle family Carabidae. This genus has a single species, Megaloodes politus. It is found in Thailand and Vietnam.
