= Acutosternus =

Scientific classification
- Kingdom: Animalia
- Phylum: Arthropoda
- Class: Insecta
- Order: Coleoptera
- Suborder: Adephaga
- Family: Carabidae
- Subfamily: Licininae
- Genus: Acutosternus; Lecordier & Girard, 1988

Genus of beetles

Acutosternus is a genus of beetles in the family Carabidae, containing the following species:

- Acutosternus mandibularis Lecordier & Girard, 1988
- Acutosternus ovatulus (Fairmaire, 1899)
