= Rhopalomelus =

Scientific classification
- Kingdom: Animalia
- Phylum: Arthropoda
- Class: Insecta
- Order: Coleoptera
- Suborder: Adephaga
- Family: Carabidae
- Subfamily: Harpalinae
- Tribe: Chlaeniini
- Subtribe: Chlaeniina
- Genus: Rhopalomelus; Boheman, 1848

Genus of beetles

Rhopalomelus is a genus in the ground beetle family Carabidae. There are at least four described species in Rhopalomelus, found in Africa.

== Species ==
These four species belong to the genus Rhopalomelus:

- Rhopalomelus angusticollis Boheman, 1848 (Zimbabwe and South Africa)
- Rhopalomelus bennigseni Alluaud, 1935 (Tanzania)
- Rhopalomelus ingens Alluaud, 1930 (DR Congo)
- Rhopalomelus stenoderus Alluaud, 1930
