= Eccoptomenus =

Scientific classification
- Domain: Eukaryota
- Kingdom: Animalia
- Phylum: Arthropoda
- Class: Insecta
- Order: Coleoptera
- Suborder: Adephaga
- Family: Carabidae
- Subfamily: Harpalinae
- Tribe: Chlaeniini
- Subtribe: Chlaeniina
- Genus: Eccoptomenus; Chaudoir, 1850

Synonyms
- Hoplogenius LaFerté-Sénectère, 1851

Genus of beetles

Eccoptomenus is a genus in the ground beetle family Carabidae. There are at least three described species in Eccoptomenus, found in Africa.

== Species ==
These three species belong to the genus Eccoptomenus:

- Eccoptomenus abessinicus (Csiki, 1931) (Ethiopia)
- Eccoptomenus eximius (Dejean, 1831) (Africa)
- Eccoptomenus obscuricollis Chaudoir, 1862 (Gabon)
