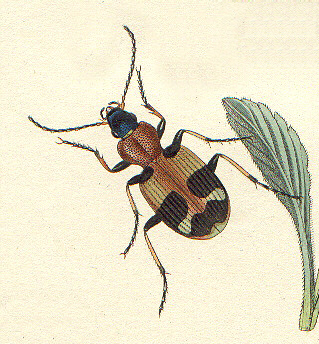
- Illustration of Callistus lunatus

Scientific classification
- Domain: Eukaryota
- Kingdom: Animalia
- Phylum: Arthropoda
- Class: Insecta
- Order: Coleoptera
- Suborder: Adephaga
- Family: Carabidae
- Genus: Callistus
- Species: C. lunatus

Binomial name
- Callistus lunatus (Fabricius, 1775)

= Callistus lunatus =

Species of beetle

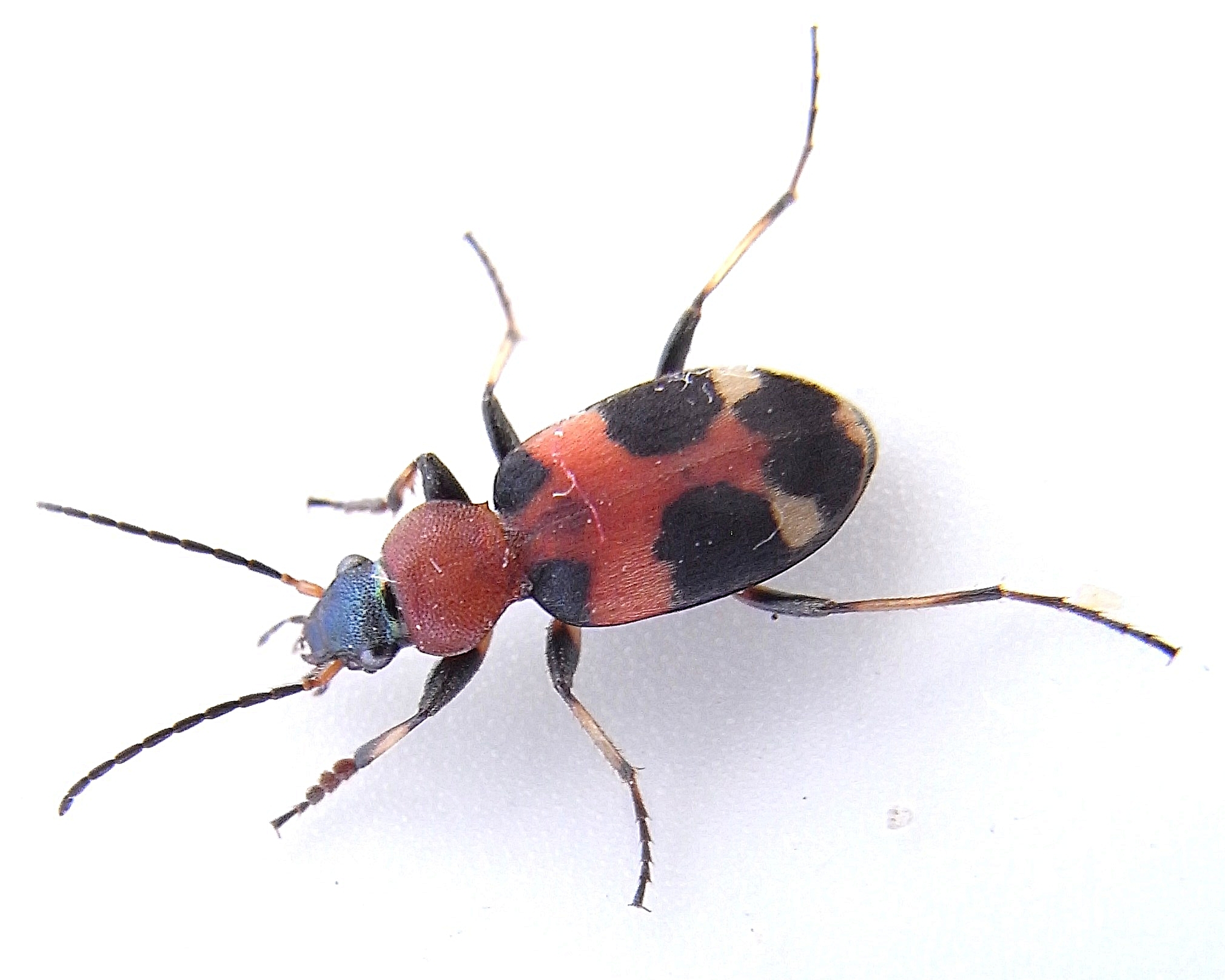
Callistus lunatus male

Callistus lunatus is a species of ground beetle in the genus Callistus.

== Distribution ==
It is native to the Palearctic (including Europe) and the Near East. In Europe, it is found in Albania, Austria, Belarus, Belgium, Bosnia and Herzegovina, Bulgaria, Croatia, the Czech Republic, European Turkey, mainland France, Germany, Great Britain including the Isle of Man, mainland Greece, Hungary, mainland Italy, Kaliningrad, Latvia (doubtful), Liechtenstein, Luxembourg, Moldova, North Macedonia, Poland, mainland Portugal, Romania, Russia (except in the Northwest), Slovenia, mainland Spain, Switzerland, the Netherlands, Ukraine and Yugoslavia.
