= Oodinus =

Scientific classification
- Kingdom: Animalia
- Phylum: Arthropoda
- Class: Insecta
- Order: Coleoptera
- Suborder: Adephaga
- Family: Carabidae
- Tribe: Oodini
- Genus: Oodinus; Motschulsky, 1864

Genus of beetles

Oodinus is a genus of beetles in the family Carabidae, containing the following species:

- Oodinus alutaceus (Bates, 1882)
- Oodinus amazonus (Chaudoir, 1882)
- Oodinus arechavaletae (Chaudoir, 1882)
- Oodinus darlingtoni Bousquet, 1996
- Oodinus edentulus Bousquet, 1996
- Oodinus exiguus (Andrewes, 1933)
- Oodinus limbellus (Chaudoir, 1882)
- Oodinus piceus Motschulsky, 1864
- Oodinus pseudopiceus Bousquet, 1996
- Oodinus similis Bousquet, 1996
