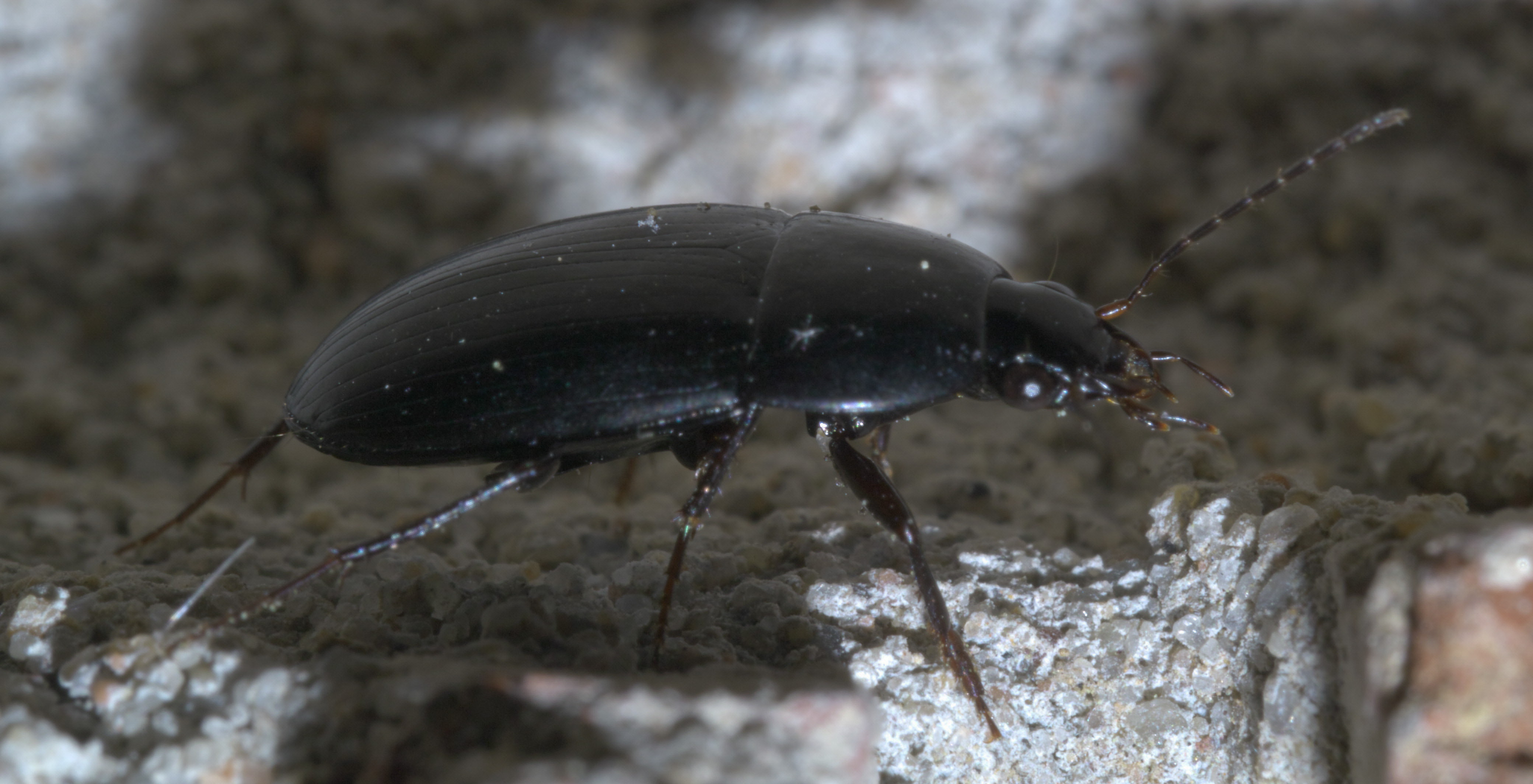
- Oodes amaroides

Scientific classification
- Domain: Eukaryota
- Kingdom: Animalia
- Phylum: Arthropoda
- Class: Insecta
- Order: Coleoptera
- Suborder: Adephaga
- Family: Carabidae
- Subfamily: Licininae
- Tribe: Oodini
- Genus: Oodes; Bonelli, 1810

Subgenera
- Lachnocrepis LeConte, 1853; Oodes Bonelli, 1810

= Oodes =

Oodes Temporal range: Cenomanian–Present

Genus of beetles

Oodes is a genus of ground beetles in the family Carabidae, found worldwide.

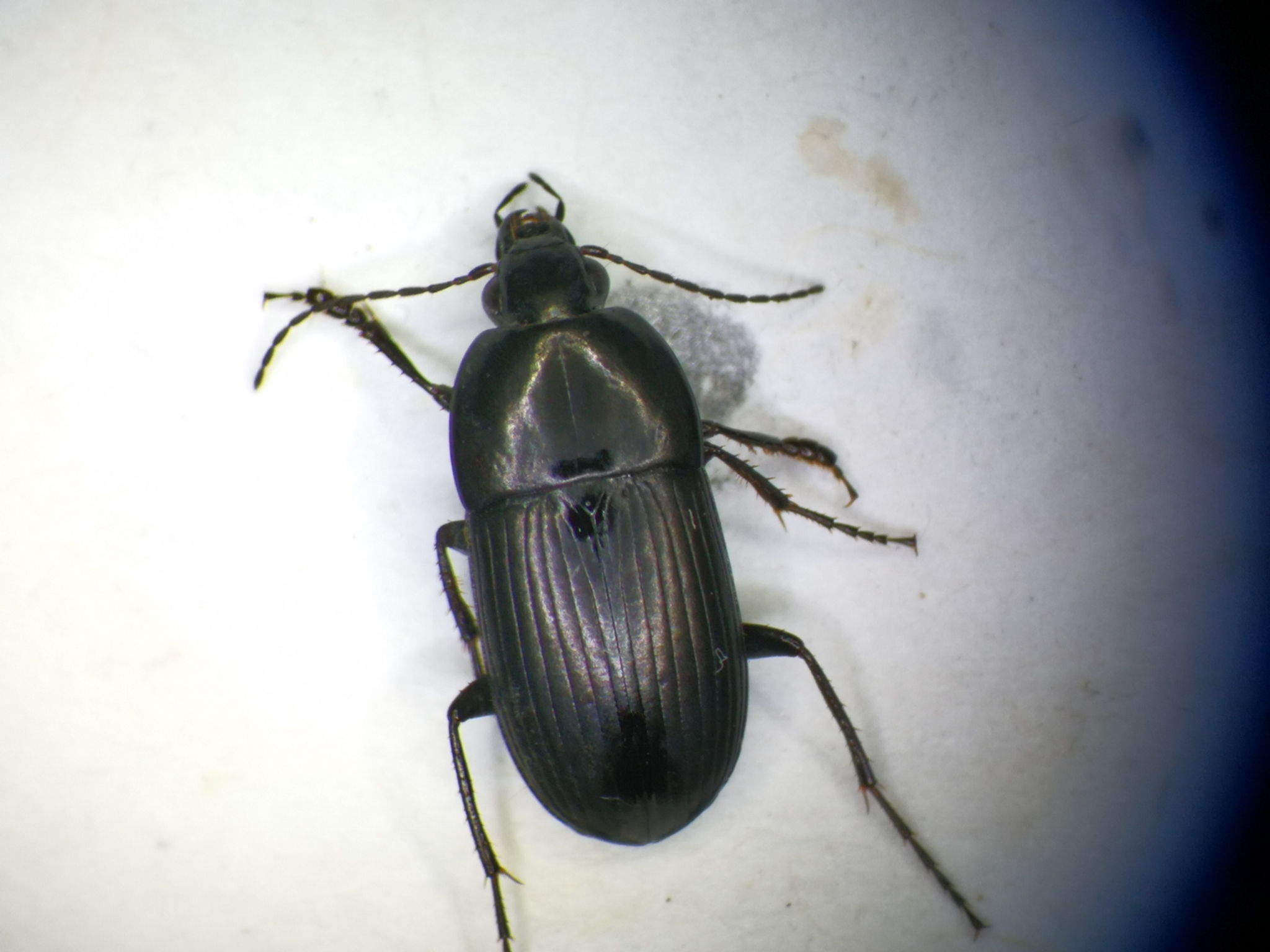
Oodes helopioides, Luxembourg

== Species ==
These 48 species belong to the genus Oodes:

- Oodes amaroides Dejean, 1831 (North America)
- Oodes americanus Dejean, 1826 (North America)
- Oodes angustus Andrewes, 1940 (India)
- Oodes austrinus Andrewes, 1940 (India)
- Oodes basrensis Ali, 1967 (Iraq)
- Oodes bivittatus Andrewes, 1924 (Sri Lanka)
- Oodes bostockii Castelnau, 1867 (Australia)
- Oodes brevis Lindroth, 1957 (North America)
- Oodes caerulans Andrewes, 1940 (India)
- Oodes calvus Andrewes, 1940 (India)
- Oodes congoensis Burgeon, 1935 (Democratic Republic of the Congo)
- Oodes denisonensis Laporte, 1867 (Australia, Indonesia, New Guinea)
- Oodes desertus Motschulsky, 1858 (Palearctic)
- Oodes echigonus Habu & Baba, 1960 (China and Japan)
- Oodes fitzroyensis W.J.MacLeay, 1888 (Australia)
- Oodes fluvialis LeConte, 1863 (North America)
- Oodes froggatti W.J.MacLeay, 1888 (Australia)
- Oodes gracilis A. & G.B.Villa, 1833 (Palearctic)
- Oodes helopioides (Fabricius, 1792) (Palearctic)
- Oodes impressus Chaudoir, 1882 (Australia)
- Oodes inornatus Laporte, 1867 (Australia)
- Oodes integer Semenov, 1889 (Russia)
- Oodes irakensis Andrewes, 1927 (Iran and Iraq)
- Oodes japonicus (Bates, 1873) (China, Japan, Laos, and Vietnam)
- Oodes latior Csiki, 1931 (Australia)
- Oodes lenis Péringuey, 1896 (Namibia)
- Oodes melanodes Andrewes, 1938 (Indonesia)
- Oodes modestus Laporte, 1867 (Australia)
- Oodes monticola Andrewes, 1940 (India)
- Oodes nil Darlington, 1968 (Indonesia and New Guinea)
- Oodes oblongus Laporte, 1867 (Australia)
- Oodes palpalis Klug, 1853 (Mozambique and South Africa)
- Oodes par Darlington, 1968 (Indonesia and New Guinea)
- Oodes parallelus Say, 1830 (North America)
- Oodes paroensis Laporte, 1867 (Australia)
- Oodes parviceps Sloane, 1896 (Australia)
- Oodes rossi Darlington, 1968 (Indonesia and New Guinea)
- Oodes siccus Darlington, 1968 (Indonesia and New Guinea)
- Oodes sikkimensis Andrewes, 1940 (India)
- Oodes sulcicollis Habu, 1978 (Nepal)
- Oodes terrestris Darlington, 1971 (New Guinea)
- Oodes tokyoensis Habu, 1956 (Japan)
- Oodes trisulcatus Laporte, 1867 (Australia)
- Oodes walshae Louwerens, 1951 (Borneo and Indonesia)
- Oodes waterhousei Laporte, 1867 (Australia)
- Oodes wilsoni Darlington, 1968 (New Guinea)
- Oodes xanthochilus Andrewes, 1923 (India and Sri Lanka)
- † Oodes kachinensis Liu, 2014 (Burmese amber, Myanmar, Cenomanian)
