= Holcocoleus =

Scientific classification
- Kingdom: Animalia
- Phylum: Arthropoda
- Class: Insecta
- Order: Coleoptera
- Suborder: Adephaga
- Family: Carabidae
- Subfamily: Licininae
- Genus: Holcocoleus; Chaudoir, 1883

Genus of beetles

Holcocoleus is a genus of beetles in the family Carabidae, containing the following species:

- Holcocoleus latus (LaFerte-Senectere, 1851)
- Holcocoleus melanopus Andrewes, 1936
