= Sphodroschema =

Scientific classification
- Domain: Eukaryota
- Kingdom: Animalia
- Phylum: Arthropoda
- Class: Insecta
- Order: Coleoptera
- Suborder: Adephaga
- Family: Carabidae
- Subfamily: Harpalinae
- Tribe: Chlaeniini
- Subtribe: Chlaeniina
- Genus: Sphodroschema; Alluaud, 1930

Genus of beetles

Sphodroschema is a genus in the beetle family Carabidae. There are at least four described species in Sphodroschema.

== Species ==
These four species belong to the genus Sphodroschema:

- Sphodroschema bayoni Alluaud, 1930 (Uganda)
- Sphodroschema crampeli Alluaud, 1930 (Africa)
- Sphodroschema haeckeli Kirschenhofer, 2014 (Zambia)
- Sphodroschema itigiensis Kirschenhofer, 2014 (Tanzania)
