= Oud (surname) =

Oud may refer to:

- Pieter Oud
- J. J. P. Oud
