= Perissostomus =

Scientific classification
- Domain: Eukaryota
- Kingdom: Animalia
- Phylum: Arthropoda
- Class: Insecta
- Order: Coleoptera
- Suborder: Adephaga
- Family: Carabidae
- Subfamily: Harpalinae
- Tribe: Chlaeniini
- Subtribe: Chlaeniina
- Genus: Perissostomus; Alluaud, 1930

Genus of beetles

Perissostomus is a genus in the beetle family Carabidae. There are at least two described species in Perissostomus.

== Species ==
These two species belong to the genus Perissostomus:

- Perissostomus palpalis Alluaud, 1930 (Somalia, Kenya, and Tanzania)
- Perissostomus trochantericus Basilewsky, 1956 (Tanzania)
