= Anatrichis =

Scientific classification
- Kingdom: Animalia
- Phylum: Arthropoda
- Class: Insecta
- Order: Coleoptera
- Suborder: Adephaga
- Family: Carabidae
- Tribe: Oodini
- Genus: Anatrichis; LeConte, 1853

Genus of beetles

Anatrichis is a genus of beetles in the family Carabidae, containing the following species:

- Anatrichis australasiae Chaudoir, 1882
- Anatrichis indica Chaudoir, 1882
- Anatrichis lilliputana (Macleay, 1888)
- Anatrichis longula Bates, 1882
- Anatrichis minuta Dejean, 1831
- Anatrichis nigra Jedlicka, 1936
- Anatrichis oblonga G.Horn, 1891
- Anatrichis ogawarai Ueno
- Anatrichis pedinoides Chaudoir, 1882
- Anatrichis pusilla Sloane, 1910
- Anatrichis sexstriata Sloane, 1900
