= Procletodema =

Scientific classification
- Kingdom: Animalia
- Phylum: Arthropoda
- Class: Insecta
- Order: Coleoptera
- Suborder: Adephaga
- Family: Carabidae
- Tribe: Chlaeniini
- Subtribe: Chlaeniina
- Genus: Procletodema; Péringuey, 1898
- Species: P. parallelum

Binomial name
- Procletodema parallelum Péringuey, 1898

Genus of beetles

Procletodema is a genus in the ground beetle family Carabidae. This genus has a single species, Procletodema parallelum. It is found in Guinea, the Democratic Republic of the Congo, Kenya, and Zimbabwe.
