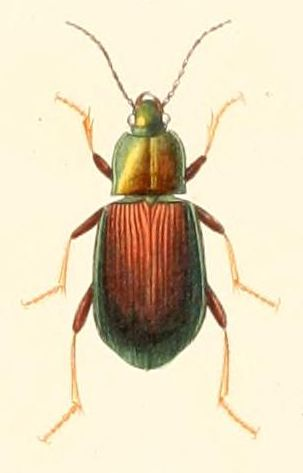
- Stenocrepis tibialis

Scientific classification
- Kingdom: Animalia
- Phylum: Arthropoda
- Class: Insecta
- Order: Coleoptera
- Suborder: Adephaga
- Family: Carabidae
- Tribe: Oodini
- Genus: Stenocrepis; Chaudoir, 1857

= Stenocrepis =

Genus of beetles

Stenocrepis is a genus of beetles in the family Carabidae, containing the following 31 species:

- Stenocrepis aeruginea (Laferte-Senectere, 1851)
- Stenocrepis angustipennis Chaudoir in Oberthür, 1883
- Stenocrepis cayennensis (Buquet, 1834)
- Stenocrepis cuprea (Chaudoir, 1843)
- Stenocrepis duodecimstriata (Chevrolat, 1835)
- Stenocrepis elegans (Leconte, 1851)
- Stenocrepis flavicrus (Laferte-Senectere, 1851)
- Stenocrepis fuscipes (Laferte-Senectere, 1851)
- Stenocrepis gilvipes Chaudoir in Oberthür, 1883
- Stenocrepis gratiosa (Bates, 1882)
- Stenocrepis guerini Chaudoir In Oberthür, 1883
- Stenocrepis insulana (Jacquelin Du Val, 1857)
- Stenocrepis laevigata (Dejean, 1831)
- Stenocrepis leprieurii (Buquet, 1834)
- Stenocrepis marginella (Perty, 1830)
- Stenocrepis metallica (Dejean, 1826)
- Stenocrepis mexicana (Chevrolat, 1835)
- Stenocrepis nigricornis (Laferte-Senectere, 1851)
- Stenocrepis olivacea (Bates, 1878)
- Stenocrepis pallipes (Brulle, 1838)
- Stenocrepis palustris Darlington, 1935
- Stenocrepis pauper Chaudoir, 1857
- Stenocrepis punctatostriata (Brulle, 1838)
- Stenocrepis quatuordecimsulcata Emden, 1949
- Stenocrepis robusta (Brulle, 1838)
- Stenocrepis sahlbergii Chaudoir, 1857
- Stenocrepis sinuata Chaudoir in Oberthür, 1883
- Stenocrepis subdepressa Darlington, 1934
- Stenocrepis tibialis (Chevrolat, 1834)
- Stenocrepis triaria Chaudoir in Oberthür, 1883
- Stenocrepis viridula Chaudoir, 1857
