= Parachlaenius =

Scientific classification
- Domain: Eukaryota
- Kingdom: Animalia
- Phylum: Arthropoda
- Class: Insecta
- Order: Coleoptera
- Suborder: Adephaga
- Family: Carabidae
- Subfamily: Harpalinae
- Tribe: Chlaeniini
- Subtribe: Chlaeniina
- Genus: Parachlaenius; Kolbe, 1894

Subgenera
- Euchlaenius Kolbe, 1894; Parachlaenius Kolbe, 1894

Genus of beetles

Parachlaenius is a genus in the beetle family Carabidae. There are about eight described species in Parachlaenius.

== Species ==
These eight species belong to the genus Parachlaenius:

- Parachlaenius diacritus Alluaud, 1930
- Parachlaenius discolor Alluaud, 1930
- Parachlaenius emini Kolbe, 1894
- Parachlaenius pseudoviolaceus Kirschenhofer, 2008 (Sierra Leone and Ghana)
- Parachlaenius punctatus (LaFerté-Sénectère, 1853) (Africa)
- Parachlaenius ruandanus Burgeon, 1935 (Democratic Republic of the Congo and Rwanda)
- Parachlaenius trochantericus (Kolbe, 1894) (Democratic Republic of the Congo, Rwanda, and Burundi)
- Parachlaenius violaceus Péringuey, 1898 (Zimbabwe)
