= Procletus =

Scientific classification
- Kingdom: Animalia
- Phylum: Arthropoda
- Class: Insecta
- Order: Coleoptera
- Suborder: Adephaga
- Superfamily: Caraboidea
- Family: Carabidae
- Genus: Procletus; Péringuey, 1896

Genus of beetles

Procletus is a genus in the beetle family Carabidae. There are about 13 described species in Procletus.

== Species ==
These 13 species belong to the genus Procletus:

- Procletus aethiopicus Kirschenhofer, 2003 (Ethiopia)
- Procletus biarticulatus (Burgeon, 1935) (Democratic Republic of the Congo)
- Procletus comoensis Kirschenhofer, 2008 (Ivory Coast)
- Procletus cryptomydis Basilewsky, 1950 (Democratic Republic of the Congo)
- Procletus gabunensis Kirschenhofer, 2008 (the Central African Republic and Gabon)
- Procletus mayumbe Kirschenhofer, 2009 (Democratic Republic of the Congo)
- Procletus minor Basilewsky, 1968 (Africa)
- Procletus pretorianus (Péringuey, 1926) (South Africa)
- Procletus sidamoensis Kirschenhofer, 2009 (Ethiopia)
- Procletus singularis Péringuey, 1896 (Africa)
- Procletus subniger Kirschenhofer, 2008 (Democratic Republic of the Congo)
- Procletus tanzaniensis Kirschenhofer, 2003 (Tanzania)
- Procletus werneri Kirschenhofer, 2008 (Ethiopia)
