= List of Chlaenius species =

This is a list of 1082 species in the genus Chlaenius, vivid metallic ground beetles.

== Chlaenius species ==
Subgenus Achlaenius Mandl, 1992
Chlaenius amplipennis Chaudoir, 1876
Chlaenius athleta Kryzhanovskij, 1976
Chlaenius dalibaiensis Kirschenhofer, 2008
Chlaenius grosseri Kirschenhofer, 2018
Chlaenius kurosawai Kasahara, 1986
Chlaenius leytensis Kirschenhofer, 2008
Chlaenius micans (Fabricius, 1792)
Chlaenius ocreatus Bates, 1873
Chlaenius rotundus Andrewes, 1920
Chlaenius sericimicans Chaudoir, 1876
Chlaenius variicornis A.Morawitz, 1863
Chlaenius vietnamensis Kirschenhofer, 2008
Subgenus Agostenus Fischer von Waldheim, 1829
Chlaenius alternatus G.Horn, 1871
Chlaenius alutaceus Gebler, 1830
Chlaenius caeruleicollis Chaudoir, 1876
Chlaenius caurinus (G.Horn, 1885)
Chlaenius costulatus (Motschulsky, 1859)
Chlaenius harpalinus Eschscholtz, 1833
Chlaenius interruptus G.Horn, 1876
Chlaenius lithophilus Say, 1823
Chlaenius niger Randall, 1838
Chlaenius quadrisulcatus (Paykull, 1790)
Chlaenius sulcicollis (Paykull, 1798)
Subgenus Aleptocerus LaFerté-Sénectère, 1851
Chlaenius quadripustulatus Dejean, 1831
Subgenus Amblygenius LaFerté-Sénectère, 1851
Chlaenius abacoides Alluaud, 1933
Chlaenius aberanus Sternberg, 1908
Chlaenius afganus Jedlicka, 1956
Chlaenius africanicus Kirschenhofer, 2009
Chlaenius allacteus Alluaud, 1919
Chlaenius allardi (Basilewsky, 1967)
Chlaenius alluaudianus Jedlicka, 1957
Chlaenius amplicollis (Basilewsky, 1953)
Chlaenius andamanensis Andrewes, 1920
Chlaenius anthraceus Alluaud, 1918
Chlaenius apollo Andrewes, 1919
Chlaenius arnoldi Basilewsky, 1949
Chlaenius aruwimius Bates, 1890
Chlaenius atripes Chaudoir, 1876
Chlaenius aurifex Basilewsky, 1949
Chlaenius baliensis Kirschenhofer, 2011
Chlaenius bangkokensis Kirschenhofer, 2004
Chlaenius bengalensis Chaudoir, 1856
Chlaenius borellyi Burgeon, 1941
Chlaenius braminus Chaudoir, 1876
Chlaenius brunnescens Kirschenhofer, 2009
Chlaenius caffer Boheman, 1848
Chlaenius cambodiensis Bates, 1889
Chlaenius cebuensis Kirschenhofer, 2008
Chlaenius cecrops Kirschenhofer, 2009
Chlaenius chagga Alluaud, 1927
Chlaenius championi Andrewes, 1923
Chlaenius chengduensis Kirschenhofer, 2004
Chlaenius chiangmaiensis Kirschenhofer, 2008
Chlaenius chlorodius Dejean, 1826
Chlaenius columbinus Dejean, 1831
Chlaenius comes Péringuey, 1896
Chlaenius congoanus Alluaud, 1934
Chlaenius consors Péringuey, 1896
Chlaenius convexus Fairmaire, 1886
Chlaenius corbetti Andrewes, 1919
Chlaenius costipennis Boheman, 1848
Chlaenius cupreolineatus Chaudoir, 1876
Chlaenius cupreolus Fairmaire, 1901
Chlaenius cupreopurpureus Kirschenhofer, 2009
Chlaenius cuprithorax Quedenfeldt, 1883
Chlaenius curtulus Kirschenhofer, 2004
Chlaenius cyanipennis Boheman, 1848
Chlaenius cyanostolus Andrewes, 1924
Chlaenius damazinensis Kirschenhofer, 2015
Chlaenius delicatus Bates, 1892
Chlaenius diabolicus (Basilewsky, 1961)
Chlaenius difficilis Sternberg, 1908
Chlaenius dilatatus (Motschulsky, 1864)
Chlaenius dimidiatus Chaudoir, 1842
Chlaenius elgonensis Alluaud, 1939
Chlaenius elongatulus Kirschenhofer, 2009
Chlaenius episcopalis Dejean, 1831
Chlaenius fairmairei Murray, 1858
Chlaenius fletcheri Andrewes, 1919
Chlaenius freyellus Jedlicka, 1959
Chlaenius gabonensis Kirschenhofer, 2009
Chlaenius gambelaensis Kirschenhofer, 2011
Chlaenius gikondo Kirschenhofer, 2009
Chlaenius glabratus Dejean, 1831
Chlaenius grootfonteinensis Kirschenhofer, 2011
Chlaenius grundmanni (Basilewsky, 1956)
Chlaenius haeckeli Kirschenhofer, 2014
Chlaenius heidenfelderi Kirschenhofer, 2008
Chlaenius henryi Andrewes, 1919
Chlaenius hypocrita Péringuey, 1896
Chlaenius inaequalis Fairmaire, 1901
Chlaenius jactus Kirschenhofer, 2004
Chlaenius jeanneli Basilewsky, 1949
Chlaenius kabompo Kirschenhofer, 2011
Chlaenius kafakumbae Burgeon, 1935
Chlaenius kalimantanensis (Kirschenhofer, 2003)
Chlaenius kapangae Burgeon, 1935
Chlaenius kathmanduensis Kirschenhofer, 2016
Chlaenius kerkvoordeae Burgeon, 1935
Chlaenius kotys Kirschenhofer, 2004
Chlaenius lacunosus Andrewes, 1920
Chlaenius laetoides Burgeon, 1935
Chlaenius laetus (Fabricius, 1794)
Chlaenius laeviusculus Chaudoir, 1856
Chlaenius lamottei (Basilewsky, 1951)
Chlaenius lapillus Basilewsky, 1949
Chlaenius latesternalis (Basilewsky, 1956)
Chlaenius latipennis Sternberg, 1908
Chlaenius leleupi (Basilewsky, 1952)
Chlaenius levicollis Péringuey, 1926
Chlaenius liocephalus (Basilewsky, 1952)
Chlaenius lioderus Andrewes, 1923
Chlaenius liothorax Alluaud, 1934
Chlaenius lissoderus Chaudoir, 1876
Chlaenius litongaensis Kirschenhofer, 2009
Chlaenius loango Kirschenhofer, 2009
Chlaenius lobozianus Alluaud, 1934
Chlaenius loeblianus Kirschenhofer, 2004
Chlaenius louwerensi Andrewes, 1936
Chlaenius lucidicollis LaFerté-Sénectère, 1851
Chlaenius luculentus Andrewes, 1920
Chlaenius lujai Burgeon, 1935
Chlaenius lulengae Burgeon, 1935
Chlaenius lyperus (Jeannel, 1949)
Chlaenius macropus Chaudoir, 1876
Chlaenius madrasensis Kirschenhofer, 2004
Chlaenius makokou Kirschenhofer, 2009
Chlaenius marondera Kirschenhofer, 2011
Chlaenius martinbaehri Kirschenhofer, 2008
Chlaenius masoni Andrewes, 1923
Chlaenius merklianus Kirschenhofer, 2012
Chlaenius meteorus Alluaud, 1939
Chlaenius meyeri Kirschenhofer, 2011
Chlaenius moaboensis Kirschenhofer, 2009
Chlaenius moheliensis Kirschenhofer, 2009
Chlaenius mpanga Kirschenhofer, 2009
Chlaenius mutatus Gemminger & Harold, 1868
Chlaenius nilgiricus Andrewes, 1919
Chlaenius nyika Kirschenhofer, 2009
Chlaenius obsidianoides Alluaud, 1935
Chlaenius obsidianus Alluaud, 1935
Chlaenius oligochrysus Alluaud, 1934
Chlaenius omochlorus Andrewes, 1931
Chlaenius opacipennis LaFerté-Sénectère, 1851
Chlaenius ostrinus Andrewes, 1924
Chlaenius persimilis Chaudoir, 1876
Chlaenius phaenoderus Chaudoir, 1876
Chlaenius pradieri Chaudoir, 1876
Chlaenius praefectus Bates, 1873
Chlaenius pretiosus Chaudoir, 1856
Chlaenius principalis Sternberg, 1908
Chlaenius probsti Kirschenhofer, 2004
Chlaenius pseudocupreolus Kirschenhofer, 2010
Chlaenius pseudoglabratus Kirschenhofer, 2009
Chlaenius pseudolulengae Kirschenhofer, 2009
Chlaenius ptuchodes Andrewes, 1923
Chlaenius pyrrhos Kirschenhofer, 2004
Chlaenius quadricolor (Olivier, 1790)
Chlaenius robertae Kavanaugh & Rainio, 2016
Chlaenius robustus Boheman, 1848
Chlaenius rubenticollis Kirschenhofer, 2009
Chlaenius rudesculptus Chaudoir, 1876
Chlaenius rufomarginatus Dejean, 1831
Chlaenius saginatus LaFerté-Sénectère, 1851
Chlaenius scheerpeltzi (Basilewsky, 1956)
Chlaenius schmidtii Gestro, 1895
Chlaenius sculptilis Bates, 1886
Chlaenius semicupreus Basilewsky, 1949
Chlaenius sierraleonensis Kirschenhofer, 2008
Chlaenius sinensis Chaudoir, 1856
Chlaenius splendidus Dejean, 1831
Chlaenius stungtrengensis Kirschenhofer, 2004
Chlaenius stygius (LaFerté-Sénectère, 1851)
Chlaenius syangyaensis Kirschenhofer, 2004
Chlaenius toubaensis Kirschenhofer, 2008
Chlaenius touzalini Andrewes, 1920
Chlaenius trachys Andrewes, 1923
Chlaenius tshibindensis Burgeon, 1935
Chlaenius tudicus Andrewes, 1919
Chlaenius unyorensis Alluaud, 1934
Chlaenius validicornis Boheman, 1848
Chlaenius veselyi Kirschenhofer, 2004
Chlaenius viangchanensis Kirschenhofer, 2011
Chlaenius victoriae Kirschenhofer, 2009
Chlaenius vividus Chaudoir, 1876
Chlaenius wittmerianus Mandl, 1978
Subgenus Anomoglossus Chaudoir, 1856
Chlaenius amoenus Dejean, 1831
Chlaenius emarginatus Say, 1823
Chlaenius pusillus Say, 1823
Subgenus Aulacosomus Grundmann, 1955
Chlaenius gundlachi Chaudoir, 1876
Chlaenius sallei Chaudoir, 1876
Subgenus Baldochlaenius Basilewsky, 1950
Chlaenius ampanihyensis Kirschenhofer, 2009
Chlaenius cham Chaudoir, 1876
Chlaenius clarksoni Barker, 1922
Chlaenius dichrous Wiedemann, 1821
Chlaenius dissimilis (Basilewsky, 1950)
Chlaenius diversus Facchini, 2011
Chlaenius erythrocnemis Chaudoir, 1876
Chlaenius natalensis Chaudoir, 1876
Chlaenius oodioides Chaudoir, 1876
Chlaenius piceus Chaudoir, 1876
Chlaenius simulatorius Barker, 1922
Chlaenius trapezicollis Chaudoir, 1856
Chlaenius vadoni (Basilewsky, 1950)
Subgenus Callistochrous Chaudoir, 1850
Chlaenius baxi (Gory, 1833)
Subgenus Callistoderus Basilewsky, 1950
Chlaenius clypeopatens (Basilewsky, 1949)
Chlaenius longeantennatus (Basilewsky, 1951)
Subgenus Callistodontus Basilewsky, 1965
Chlaenius ghesquierei Burgeon, 1935
Subgenus Callistoides Motschulsky, 1865
Chlaenius amabilis Chaudoir, 1876
Chlaenius caeruleiceps Bates, 1892
Chlaenius changwatensis (Kirschenhofer, 1998)
Chlaenius coquerelii Fairmaire, 1869
Chlaenius deliciolus Bates, 1873
Chlaenius gardoensis (Kirschenhofer, 2009)
Chlaenius guttula Chaudoir, 1856
Chlaenius indicus Jedlicka, 1956
Chlaenius lativittis Chaudoir, 1876
Chlaenius maculiceps Boheman, 1848
Chlaenius malachinus (Motschulsky, 1865)
Chlaenius melanopus Andrewes, 1923
Chlaenius pericallus L.Redtenbacher, 1868
Chlaenius pudicus (Fabricius, 1801)
Chlaenius pulchellus Boheman, 1848
Chlaenius pulchriceps Fairmaire, 1901
Chlaenius pumilio Kolbe, 1889
Chlaenius subferrugineus (Kirschenhofer, 2003)
Chlaenius thieleni (Kirschenhofer, 1998)
Chlaenius trinotatus LaFerté-Sénectère, 1851
Chlaenius tripustulatus (Dejean, 1831)
Chlaenius uninotatus Andrewes, 1919
Chlaenius venustulus Dejean, 1831
Chlaenius vitticollis Boheman, 1848
Chlaenius xanthospilus (Wiedemann, 1821)
Subgenus Callistometus Grundmann, 1956
Chlaenius ruficauda Chaudoir, 1856
Subgenus Calochlaenius Kuntzen, 1913
Chlaenius makalolo Bates, 1886
Chlaenius swahilius Bates, 1886
Subgenus Capsochlaenius Basilewsky, 1950
Chlaenius luisae Gestro, 1895
Subgenus Chlaeniellus Reitter, 1908
Chlaenius abjectus Andrewes, 1920
Chlaenius alesi Jedlicka, 1935
Chlaenius baoxingensis Kirschenhofer, 2004
Chlaenius bergerdostali Kirschenhofer, 2016
Chlaenius bonelli (Mateu, 1947)
Chlaenius breuningi Jedlicka, 1931
Chlaenius brevilabris LeConte, 1847
Chlaenius circumcinctus Say, 1830
Chlaenius circumductus A.Morawitz, 1862
Chlaenius comans Andrewes, 1919
Chlaenius cookei Andrewes, 1933
Chlaenius coxalis Fischer von Waldheim, 1844
Chlaenius curtii (Lemaire, 2001)
Chlaenius differens Peyron, 1858
Chlaenius douei Peyron, 1858
Chlaenius etoshaensis Kirschenhofer, 2009
Chlaenius extensus Mannerheim, 1825
Chlaenius fastigatus Andrewes, 1921
Chlaenius flaccidus G.Horn, 1876
Chlaenius flavipes Ménétriés, 1832
Chlaenius floridanus G.Horn, 1876
Chlaenius fraterculus Maindron, 1899
Chlaenius fugax Chaudoir, 1876
Chlaenius gansuensis Jedlicka, 1935
Chlaenius glaucus LeConte, 1856
Chlaenius hainanensis Kirschenhofer, 2004
Chlaenius hemichlorus Fairmaire, 1889
Chlaenius impressicollis Chaudoir, 1876
Chlaenius impunctifrons Say, 1823
Chlaenius inops Chaudoir, 1856
Chlaenius intermedius Chaudoir, 1856
Chlaenius jacobsoni Andrewes, 1926
Chlaenius jaleswarensis Kirschenhofer, 2004
Chlaenius judianensis Kirschenhofer, 2004
Chlaenius jureceki Jedlicka, 1935
Chlaenius kindermanni Chaudoir, 1856
Chlaenius kirschenhoferi Azadbakhsh, 2017
Chlaenius laeviplaga Chaudoir, 1876
Chlaenius langmusiensis Kirschenhofer, 2008
Chlaenius latithorax Mannerheim in Chaudoir, 1844
Chlaenius leigongshanensis Kirschenhofer, 2004
Chlaenius lineicinctus Fairmaire, 1901
Chlaenius manus Louwerens, 1969
Chlaenius marginellus Dejean, 1831
Chlaenius marginicollis Boheman, 1848
Chlaenius melampus Ménétriés, 1848
Chlaenius nebraskensis LeConte, 1856
Chlaenius nemoralis Say, 1823
Chlaenius nigricornis (Fabricius, 1787)
Chlaenius nitidulus (Schrank, 1781)
Chlaenius obscurus Klug, 1832
Chlaenius obsoletus LeConte, 1851
Chlaenius olivieri Crotch, 1871
Chlaenius oxygonus Chaudoir, 1843
Chlaenius pennsylvanicus Say, 1823
Chlaenius pertinax Casey, 1920
Chlaenius pilosicoerulans Mandl, 1989
Chlaenius pratensis Chaudoir, 1876
Chlaenius prostenus Bates, 1873
Chlaenius pseudotristis Chanu & Swaminathan, 2017
Chlaenius puncticephalis Saha, 1984
Chlaenius rafiki Alluaud, 1929
Chlaenius richardsi Ali, 1967
Chlaenius sagaingensis Kirschenhofer, 2005
Chlaenius semenowi Tschitscherine, 1896
Chlaenius semiviridis Andrewes, 1920
Chlaenius shaanxinensis Kirschenhofer, 2004
Chlaenius similatus Boheman, 1848
Chlaenius simillimus Chaudoir, 1856
Chlaenius sinuatus Dejean, 1826
Chlaenius stenoristus Chaudoir, 1876
Chlaenius sterbai Jedlicka, 1935
Chlaenius submarginatus Chaudoir, 1876
Chlaenius syriacus Chaudoir, 1876
Chlaenius tenuelimbatus Ballion, 1871
Chlaenius terminatus Dejean, 1826
Chlaenius texanus G.Horn, 1876
Chlaenius tibialis Dejean, 1826
Chlaenius topali Kirschenhofer, 2004
Chlaenius tricolor Dejean, 1826
Chlaenius tristis (Schaller, 1783)
Chlaenius vafer LeConte, 1852
Chlaenius variabilipes Eschscholtz, 1833
Chlaenius velocipes Chaudoir, 1876
Chlaenius vestitus (Paykull, 1790)
Chlaenius wuxiangensis Kirschenhofer, 2011
Subgenus Chlaenioctenus Bates, 1892
Chlaenius aodai Liu & Liang, 2013
Chlaenius bilyi Kirschenhofer, 2009
Chlaenius bodhidharma Liu & Liang, 2013
Chlaenius cheni Liu & Liang, 2013
Chlaenius chiangdaoensis Kirschenhofer, 2020
Chlaenius eneides Bates, 1892
Chlaenius freyi Jedlicka, 1960
Chlaenius langsonensis Kirschenhofer, 2008
Chlaenius li Liu & Liang, 2013
Chlaenius pectinipes Bates, 1892
Chlaenius piligenys Liu & Liang, 2010
Chlaenius rotundithorax Liu & Kavanaugh, 2010
Chlaenius schillhammeri Kirschenhofer, 2003
Chlaenius sehnali Kirschenhofer, 2008
Chlaenius sikkimensis Kirschenhofer, 2013
Chlaenius tingaudi Lassalle, 2015
Subgenus Chlaeniodromus Basilewsky, 1950
Chlaenius tetraphacus Alluaud, 1918
Subgenus Chlaeniodus Jeannel, 1949
Chlaenius longulus (Jeannel, 1949)
Chlaenius perrieri Fairmaire, 1901
Subgenus Chlaenionus Kuntzen, 1913
Chlaenius aethiopicus Chaudoir, 1876
Chlaenius colasi Kirschenhofer, 2008
Chlaenius dohrnii (Bertoloni, 1857)
Chlaenius katanganus Burgeon, 1935
Chlaenius mkongoensis Kirschenhofer, 2016
Chlaenius pendjariensis Kirschenhofer, 2011
Chlaenius perpunctatus Kuntzen, 1913
Chlaenius schoutedeni Burgeon, 1935
Chlaenius variolosus Kirschenhofer, 2008
Chlaenius zanzibaricus Chaudoir, 1883
Subgenus Chlaeniostenodes Basilewsky, 1953
Chlaenius backanensis Kirschenhofer, 2014
Chlaenius canariensis Dejean, 1831
Chlaenius cherensis Kirschenhofer, 1999
Chlaenius coeruleipennis Boheman, 1860
Chlaenius dureli Maindron, 1899
Chlaenius gaoligongensis Kirschenhofer, 2011
Chlaenius laeticollis Chaudoir, 1876
Chlaenius melanopterus Chaudoir, 1876
Chlaenius modestus Boheman, 1848
Chlaenius nigripennis Chaudoir, 1856
Chlaenius persicus L.Redtenbacher, 1850
Chlaenius prabangensis Kirschenhofer, 2009
Chlaenius ruthmuellerae Kirschenhofer, 2008
Chlaenius schatzmayri Basilewsky, 1949
Chlaenius semperi Chaudoir, 1876
Chlaenius skukuzaensis Kirschenhofer, 2008
Chlaenius suensoni Mandl, 1992
Chlaenius tansaniensis Kirschenhofer, 1999
Chlaenius wewalkai Kirschenhofer, 2008
Subgenus Chlaeniostenus Kuntzen, 1919
Chlaenius accedens Chaudoir, 1876
Chlaenius acroxanthus Chaudoir, 1876
Chlaenius amauropterus Chaudoir, 1856
Chlaenius angustatus Dejean, 1831
Chlaenius anthracoderus LaFerté-Sénectère, 1851
Chlaenius apicalis (Wiedemann, 1819)
Chlaenius assamensis Kirschenhofer, 2003
Chlaenius attenuatus Klug, 1833
Chlaenius balthasari Jedlicka, 1935
Chlaenius camerunensis Kirschenhofer, 2003
Chlaenius ceramensis Kirschenhofer, 2003
Chlaenius circumdatus Brullé, 1835
Chlaenius congoensis Burgeon, 1935
Chlaenius consobrinus Péringuey, 1896
Chlaenius cupripennis Chaudoir, 1876
Chlaenius cylindricollis Dejean, 1831
Chlaenius daer Darlington, 1968
Chlaenius darlingensis Laporte, 1867
Chlaenius denticulatus Dejean, 1831
Chlaenius dorsalis Dejean, 1831
Chlaenius epistrophus Alluaud, 1927
Chlaenius euryscopus Bates, 1886
Chlaenius fraternus Kolbe, 1889
Chlaenius helios Kirschenhofer, 2019
Chlaenius hunanensis Kirschenhofer, 2003
Chlaenius janaki Kirschenhofer, 2009
Chlaenius jucundulus (Basilewsky, 1970)
Chlaenius kathrynae Kavanaugh & Rainio, 2016
Chlaenius kenieroba Kirschenhofer, 2019
Chlaenius kivuanus Basilewsky, 1949
Chlaenius leopoldi Burgeon, 1935
Chlaenius leucoristus Chaudoir, 1876
Chlaenius lirifer Andrewes, 1941
Chlaenius melancholicus LaFerté-Sénectère, 1851
Chlaenius merkli Kirschenhofer, 2003
Chlaenius nigrans Kirschenhofer, 2003
Chlaenius nitidicollis Dejean, 1826
Chlaenius noeli Alluaud, 1933
Chlaenius nubicus Chaudoir, 1876
Chlaenius overlaeti Burgeon, 1935
Chlaenius pachys Chaudoir, 1876
Chlaenius perinetanus Facchini, 2011
Chlaenius philemon Andrewes, 1936
Chlaenius postscriptus Bates, 1873
Chlaenius prolixus Erichson, 1843
Chlaenius propinquus Csiki, 1931
Chlaenius pulcher Nietner, 1856
Chlaenius punctatostriatus Chaudoir, 1856
Chlaenius rugulosus Nietner, 1856
Chlaenius scotti Alluaud, 1937
Chlaenius sellatus Dejean, 1831
Chlaenius sibutensis Kirschenhofer, 2009
Chlaenius similis Chaudoir, 1856
Chlaenius sollicitus LaFerté-Sénectère, 1851
Chlaenius subcostatus W.J.MacLeay, 1864
Chlaenius subovatus Chaudoir, 1876
Chlaenius sulcipennis Dejean, 1826
Chlaenius synaptus Alluaud, 1918
Chlaenius tenuicollis (Fabricius, 1801)
Chlaenius transfuga Chaudoir, 1876
Chlaenius tsanerenaensis Kirschenhofer, 2009
Chlaenius vitalisi Andrewes, 1919
Subgenus Chlaenites Motschulsky, 1860
Chlaenius inderiensis Motschulsky, 1849
Chlaenius spoliatus (P.Rossi, 1792)
Subgenus Chlaenius Bonelli, 1810
Chlaenius adonis Andrewes, 1923
Chlaenius aestivus Say, 1823
Chlaenius alaotraensis Kirschenhofer, 2009
Chlaenius alfredpuchneri Kirschenhofer, 2014
Chlaenius allardianus Lorenz, 1998
Chlaenius amazonicus Chaudoir, 1876
Chlaenius amydrus Alluaud, 1934
Chlaenius androyanus Jeannel, 1949
Chlaenius arakanensis (Brunk & Kirschenhofer, 2016)
Chlaenius atratus Chaudoir, 1876
Chlaenius augustus Newman, 1838
Chlaenius auripilis Andrewes, 1936
Chlaenius azurescens Chaudoir, 1876
Chlaenius bakwuensis Kirschenhofer, 2004
Chlaenius binghami Andrewes, 1919
Chlaenius brasiliensis Dejean, 1831
Chlaenius breviusculus Chaudoir, 1876
Chlaenius chalcoderus Chaudoir, 1876
Chlaenius chalcothorax Wiedemann, 1823
Chlaenius chaudoiri G.Horn, 1876
Chlaenius collarti Alluaud, 1933
Chlaenius communimacula Chaudoir, 1883
Chlaenius cordifer Bates, 1891
Chlaenius coscinioderus Chaudoir, 1856
Chlaenius cosciniophorus Chaudoir, 1876
Chlaenius cribellicollis Chaudoir, 1876
Chlaenius cruciatus Dejean, 1831
Chlaenius cubanus Chaudoir, 1876
Chlaenius cumatilis LeConte, 1851
Chlaenius cursor Chevrolat, 1835
Chlaenius densaticollis Fairmaire, 1901
Chlaenius deserticola Raffray, 1886
Chlaenius deuvei Kirschenhofer, 2008 (Junior homonym?)
Chlaenius dinodoides Chaudoir, 1876
Chlaenius discopictus Fairmaire, 1893
Chlaenius dusaultii (L.Dufour, 1821)
Chlaenius erythropus Germar, 1823
Chlaenius eurybates Bates, 1891
Chlaenius fallax (Olivier, 1795)
Chlaenius festivus (Panzer, 1796)
Chlaenius fizianus Basilewsky, 1961
Chlaenius flavicornis Fischer von Waldheim, 1842
Chlaenius forreri Bates, 1884
Chlaenius fritzweiserti Kirschenhofer, 2018
Chlaenius fuscicornis Dejean, 1831
Chlaenius geayi Jeannel, 1949
Chlaenius gonioderus LaFerté-Sénectère, 1851
Chlaenius guatemalenus Bates, 1882
Chlaenius herbaceus Chevrolat, 1834
Chlaenius horni Sternberg, 1908
Chlaenius humeralis Chaudoir, 1856
Chlaenius indutus Klug, 1833
Chlaenius isaloensis Kirschenhofer, 2009
Chlaenius itombwanus Basilewsky, 1961
Chlaenius ivorensis Facchini, 2011
Chlaenius jamaicae Darlington, 1936
Chlaenius kolariensis Maindron, 1898
Chlaenius kryzhanovskyi Basilewsky, 1968
Chlaenius lafertei Guérin-Méneville, 1843
Chlaenius lateralis Brullé, 1838
Chlaenius laticollis Say, 1823
Chlaenius leprieuri Gory, 1833
Chlaenius leptopus Basilewsky, 1956
Chlaenius lineellus Motschulsky, 1859
Chlaenius lomii G.Müller, 1941
Chlaenius longicornis Chaudoir, 1843
Chlaenius loxias Kirschenhofer, 2004
Chlaenius luzonicus Chaudoir, 1856
Chlaenius maculatus Dejean, 1826
Chlaenius madangensis Kirschenhofer, 2009
Chlaenius mandli Grundmann, 1956
Chlaenius meticulosus LaFerté-Sénectère, 1851
Chlaenius milloti Jeannel, 1949
Chlaenius monardi Alluaud, 1934
Chlaenius morosus LaFerté-Sénectère, 1851
Chlaenius nigroscelis Chaudoir, 1856
Chlaenius nitidiceps Dejean, 1826
Chlaenius nitidifrons Fairmaire, 1901
Chlaenius notabilis LaFerté-Sénectère, 1851
Chlaenius obesus LaFerté-Sénectère, 1851
Chlaenius oblongus Dejean, 1826
Chlaenius obscuripennis Chevrolat, 1835
Chlaenius obtusus Dejean, 1831
Chlaenius orbus G.Horn, 1871
Chlaenius pailinensis Kirschenhofer, 2011
Chlaenius pallipes (Gebler, 1823)
Chlaenius patruelis LeConte, 1844
Chlaenius phenax Basilewsky, 1949
Chlaenius planipennis Chaudoir, 1876
Chlaenius planulatus Bates, 1884
Chlaenius platensis G.R.Waterhouse, 1841
Chlaenius platyderus Chaudoir, 1856
Chlaenius platynoides Alluaud, 1934
Chlaenius plausibilis Basilewsky, 1949
Chlaenius porinus Alluaud, 1929
Chlaenius porphyrius Bates, 1891
Chlaenius porrectus Chaudoir, 1876
Chlaenius pseudocruciatus Kirschenhofer, 2009
Chlaenius pseudoglaber (Casale, 1984)
Chlaenius puberulus Boheman, 1848
Chlaenius pubipennis Chaudoir, 1856
Chlaenius putzeysi Chaudoir, 1876
Chlaenius quadrinotatus Dejean, 1826
Chlaenius quadriornatus Basilewsky, 1956
Chlaenius quadrisignatus Boheman, 1860
Chlaenius ranavalonae Csiki, 1931
Chlaenius rhysonotus Fairmaire, 1901
Chlaenius riparius Lorenz, 1998
Chlaenius ripicola Andrewes, 1937
Chlaenius rodriguezi Chaudoir, 1876
Chlaenius rukwaensis Kirschenhofer, 2007
Chlaenius scabricollis Chevrolat, 1833
Chlaenius scapularis Chaudoir, 1876
Chlaenius sciakyi Kirschenhofer, 2004
Chlaenius scutellaris Harold, 1881
Chlaenius senegalensis Dejean, 1831
Chlaenius sericeus (Forster, 1771)
Chlaenius signatus Boheman, 1848
Chlaenius silvestrii G.Müller, 1942
Chlaenius sivorii Chaudoir, 1876
Chlaenius soccatus Say, 1830
Chlaenius sparsepunctatus Chaudoir, 1876
Chlaenius sparsus LeConte, 1863
Chlaenius straneoi Basilewsky, 1949
Chlaenius subglaber (Andrewes, 1937)
Chlaenius subsulcatus Dejean, 1831
Chlaenius suppletor Bates, 1891
Chlaenius systolocranioides Alluaud, 1933
Chlaenius tartagalensis Kirschenhofer, 2014
Chlaenius tchabalensis Kirschenhofer, 2009
Chlaenius testaceicrus Fairmaire, 1891
Chlaenius tetraspilus Alluaud, 1918
Chlaenius tinantae Burgeon, 1935
Chlaenius transversalis Dejean, 1831
Chlaenius tuky Basilewsky, 1949
Chlaenius uluguruanus Basilewsky, 1956
Chlaenius uzungwensis Basilewsky, 1951
Chlaenius velutinus (Duftschmid, 1812)
Chlaenius viduus G.Horn, 1871
Chlaenius violatus Gemminger & Harold, 1868
Chlaenius virescens Chaudoir, 1835
Chlaenius viridicollis Reiche, 1843
Chlaenius walterrossii Giachino & Allegro, 2018
Chlaenius ziloensis Basilewsky, 1970
Chlaenius zygogrammus LaFerté-Sénectère, 1851
Subgenus Compsochlaenius Alluaud, 1916
Chlaenius acutecostatus Alluaud, 1933
Chlaenius eyeni Basilewsky, 1949
Chlaenius longeantennatus (Basilewsky, 1952)
Chlaenius postmaculatus (Basilewsky, 1952)
Chlaenius sankuruensis Burgeon, 1935
Chlaenius treichi Alluaud, 1916
Subgenus Dacnochlaenius Alluaud, 1919
Chlaenius benyovszkyi (Csiki, 1931)
Chlaenius guineensis (Alluaud, 1925)
Chlaenius soricinus Gerstaecker, 1867
Subgenus Dinodes Bonelli, 1810
Chlaenius armenus Jedlicka, 1950
Chlaenius baeticus (Rambur, 1837)
Chlaenius cruralis Fischer von Waldheim, 1829
Chlaenius decipiens (L.Dufour, 1820)
Chlaenius dives Dejean, 1826
Chlaenius fulgidicollis (L.Dufour, 1820)
Chlaenius huedepohli Mandl, 1983
Chlaenius viridis (Ménétriés, 1832)
Subgenus Eochlaenius Semenov, 1912
Chlaenius suvorovi (Semenov, 1912)
Subgenus Epomis Bonelli, 1810
Chlaenius alluaudi Fairmaire, 1901
Chlaenius amarae Andrewes, 1920
Chlaenius barkeri Csiki, 1931
Chlaenius bocandei (LaFerté-Sénectère, 1852)
Chlaenius circumscriptus (Duftschmid, 1812)
Chlaenius croesus (Fabricius, 1801)
Chlaenius croyi Kirschenhofer, 2003
Chlaenius daressalaami Jedlicka, 1957
Chlaenius dejeanii (Dejean, 1831)
Chlaenius deplanatus (LaFerté-Sénectère, 1851)
Chlaenius duvaucelii (Dejean, 1831)
Chlaenius elisabethanus Burgeon, 1935
Chlaenius elongatus (Klug, 1833)
Chlaenius fimbriatus (Klug, 1833)
Chlaenius immunitus Murray, 1858
Chlaenius jordani (Basilewsky, 1955)
Chlaenius kenyerii Kirschenhofer, 2003
Chlaenius lastii Bates, 1886
Chlaenius latreillei (LaFerté-Sénectère, 1852)
Chlaenius loveridgei (Basilewsky, 1951)
Chlaenius nigricans Wiedemann, 1821
Chlaenius nossibianus Facchini, 2011
Chlaenius protensus Chaudoir, 1876
Chlaenius rhodesianus Péringuey, 1898
Chlaenius simba Alluaud, 1929
Chlaenius tschitscherini Jedlicka, 1952
Chlaenius vientianensis Kirschenhofer, 2009
Chlaenius violaceipennis Chaudoir, 1876
Subgenus Eudinodes Basilewsky, 1965
Chlaenius cavilabrum Barker, 1922
Chlaenius oneili Barker, 1922
Chlaenius superstes Péringuey, 1926
Subgenus Eurydactylus LaFerté-Sénectère, 1851
Chlaenius aurolimbatus (LaFerté-Sénectère, 1851)
Chlaenius koltzei (Grundmann, 1956)
Chlaenius menevillei Chaudoir, 1876
Chlaenius pimalicus Casey, 1914
Chlaenius soginoides Chaudoir, 1876
Chlaenius tomentosus (Say, 1823)
Chlaenius validus (Chevrolat, 1835)
Subgenus Goniodinodes Jeannel, 1949
Chlaenius darlingtoni (Basilewsky, 1951)
Chlaenius howa Künckel d'Herculais, 1891
Chlaenius pseudoraffrayi Basilewsky, 1949
Chlaenius raffrayi Chaudoir, 1876
Subgenus Haplochlaenius Lutshnik, 1933
Chlaenius baehri (Kirschenhofer, 1998)
Chlaenius costiger Chaudoir, 1856
Chlaenius drescheri Louwerens, 1951
Chlaenius evae Wrase, 2012
Chlaenius femoratus Dejean, 1826
Chlaenius hutiaoxiaensis Kirschenhofer, 2011
Chlaenius insularis (Ueno, 1964)
Chlaenius klapperichi Jedlicka, 1956
Chlaenius moluccensis Kirschenhofer, 2003
Chlaenius nanlingensis Deuve & Tian, 2005
Chlaenius pan Darlington, 1968
Chlaenius pantarensis Kirschenhofer, 2014
Chlaenius peltastes Jedlicka, 1935
Chlaenius qinqchensis Wrase & Kirschenhofer, 2012
Chlaenius ramezani Azadbakhsh & Kirschenhofer, 2019
Chlaenius sabahensis Kirschenhofer, 1998
Chlaenius wegneri Louwerens, 1953
Subgenus Hemichlaenius Bates, 1892
Chlaenius microspilus (Bates, 1892)
Subgenus Homalolachnus LaFerté-Sénectère, 1851
Chlaenius colmanti Alluaud, 1933
Chlaenius epicosmoides (Basilewsky, 1956)
Chlaenius feanus Bates, 1892
Chlaenius flavoscriptus Quedenfeldt, 1891
Chlaenius goossensi Alluaud, 1933
Chlaenius helvetorum Burgeon, 1935
Chlaenius himalayicus Andrewes, 1923
Chlaenius impictus Alluaud, 1933
Chlaenius kashituensis Kirschenhofer, 2009
Chlaenius katanga Kirschenhofer, 2009
Chlaenius lineatus Putzeys, 1880
Chlaenius moestus Csiki, 1931
Chlaenius morettoi Kirschenhofer, 2008
Chlaenius nigerrimus Jedlicka, 1958
Chlaenius panagaeoides (LaFerté-Sénectère, 1851)
Chlaenius quadrivittatus Jedlicka, 1958
Chlaenius ruvumaensis Kirschenhofer, 2008
Chlaenius sexguttatus Andrewes, 1919
Chlaenius sexmaculatus Dejean, 1831
Chlaenius sibuti Alluaud, 1915
Chlaenius sykesi Hope, 1833
Chlaenius umtalianus (Péringuey, 1904)
Chlaenius vertagoides (LaFerté-Sénectère, 1851)
Chlaenius vethi Bates, 1889
Subgenus Indalma Schmidt-Goebel, 1846
Chlaenius elegans (Schmidt-Goebel, 1846)
Subgenus Leptodinodes Jeannel, 1949
Chlaenius parallelus Dejean, 1831
Subgenus Leptorembus Kolbe, 1889
Chlaenius angolanus (Basilewsky, 1953)
Chlaenius flavomaculatus (Kolbe, 1889)
Chlaenius kolbei (Duvivier, 1892)
Chlaenius kwazuluensis Kirschenhofer, 2009
Chlaenius nimbanus (Basilewsky, 1951)
Chlaenius varians Chaudoir, 1876
Subgenus Lissauchenius W.S.MacLeay, 1825
Chlaenius ammon (Fabricius, 1801)
Chlaenius analisimilis Pomeroy, 1932
Chlaenius antennatus Chaudoir, 1876
Chlaenius aspericollis Bates, 1873
Chlaenius assecla LaFerté-Sénectère, 1851
Chlaenius atropos Andrewes, 1941
Chlaenius bandjermasinensis Kirschenhofer, 2008
Chlaenius bifenestratus Klug, 1832
Chlaenius bioculatus Chaudoir, 1856
Chlaenius bivulnerus Motschulsky, 1858
Chlaenius boali Kirschenhofer, 2016
Chlaenius boisduvalii Dejean, 1831
Chlaenius borgouensis Kirschenhofer, 2007
Chlaenius boukali Kirschenhofer, 2005
Chlaenius caecus Dejean, 1831
Chlaenius chainatensis Kirschenhofer, 2011
Chlaenius chapanus Andrewes, 1919
Chlaenius chrysoderus Chaudoir, 1876
Chlaenius crebrepunctatus Chaudoir, 1856
Chlaenius cribellatus Chaudoir, 1876
Chlaenius darfurensis Kirschenhofer, 2007
Chlaenius distigma Chaudoir, 1876
Chlaenius dondoensis Kirschenhofer, 2007
Chlaenius effugiens Péringuey, 1908
Chlaenius eritreaensis Kirschenhofer, 2007
Chlaenius farai Jedlicka, 1949
Chlaenius fasciger Chaudoir, 1883
Chlaenius fenestratus Chaudoir, 1876
Chlaenius flaviguttatus W.S.MacLeay, 1825
Chlaenius fulvipes (Chaudoir, 1835)
Chlaenius geisthardti Kirschenhofer, 2007
Chlaenius geniculatus (Basilewsky, 1956)
Chlaenius gestroi Chaudoir, 1876
Chlaenius goryi Gory, 1833
Chlaenius heyrovskyi Jedlicka, 1949
Chlaenius hildebrandti Harold, 1881
Chlaenius imperialis Sternberg, 1908
Chlaenius kaszabi Jedlicka, 1951
Chlaenius keniaensis Kirschenhofer, 2008
Chlaenius kilimanus (Basilewsky, 1956)
Chlaenius kira Alluaud, 1929
Chlaenius kraatzi Sternberg, 1908
Chlaenius laosensis Kirschenhofer, 2008
Chlaenius limbicollis Chaudoir, 1876
Chlaenius lombokensis Kirschenhofer, 2008
Chlaenius maculiger Laporte, 1867
Chlaenius meiguensis Kirschenhofer, 2015
Chlaenius momboensis Kirschenhofer, 2007
Chlaenius montivagus Andrewes, 1923
Chlaenius naeviger A.Morawitz, 1862
Chlaenius nepos Chaudoir, 1876
Chlaenius nigratus Kirschenhofer, 2007
Chlaenius oculatus (Fabricius, 1801)
Chlaenius olthofi Darlington, 1968
Chlaenius orphanus Péringuey, 1908
Chlaenius ovampo Péringuey, 1892
Chlaenius paluensis Kirschenhofer, 2011
Chlaenius perspicillaris Erichson, 1843
Chlaenius pongraczi Jedlicka, 1951
Chlaenius posticalis Motschulsky, 1854
Chlaenius procerulus Kirschenhofer, 2009
Chlaenius pseudobipustulatus Facchini, 2011
Chlaenius puchneri Kirschenhofer, 2007
Chlaenius pyrrhopodus Fairmaire, 1903
Chlaenius roeschkei Sternberg, 1908
Chlaenius rucickai Kirschenhofer, 2015
Chlaenius rudicollis Chaudoir, 1876
Chlaenius rufifemoratus (W.S.MacLeay, 1825)
Chlaenius seiferti Kirschenhofer, 2005
Chlaenius semipurpureus Motschulsky, 1865
Chlaenius seyrigi Alluaud, 1935
Chlaenius sichuanensis Kirschenhofer, 2008
Chlaenius simbabwensis Kirschenhofer, 2008
Chlaenius stichai Jedlicka, 1949
Chlaenius suavis Alluaud, 1939
Chlaenius sumbavaensis Kirschenhofer, 2014
Chlaenius superbus Sternberg, 1908
Chlaenius tanahrataensis Kirschenhofer, 2008
Chlaenius tetragonoderus Chaudoir, 1876
Chlaenius thiesensis Kirschenhofer, 2007
Chlaenius toliaraensis Kirschenhofer, 2015
Chlaenius udaipurensis Chanu & Swaminathan, 2017
Chlaenius unicolor Chaudoir, 1856
Chlaenius variipes Chaudoir, 1856
Chlaenius wuduensis KIrschenhofer, 2013
Chlaenius xanthomerus Alluaud, 1918
Chlaenius yangonensis Kirschenhofer, 2005
Chlaenius yunnanulus Mandl, 1992
Subgenus Lithochlaenius Kryzhanovskij, 1976
Chlaenius agilis Chaudoir, 1856
Chlaenius agiloides Jedlicka, 1935
Chlaenius argentinicus Jedlicka, 1946
Chlaenius chlorochrous Chaudoir, 1876
Chlaenius chuanqianensis Liu & Liang, 2011
Chlaenius cordicollis Kirby, 1837
Chlaenius ecuadoricus Jedlicka, 1946
Chlaenius formosensis Lorenz, 1998
Chlaenius leishanensis Kirschenhofer, 2005
Chlaenius leucoscelis Chevrolat, 1835
Chlaenius linwensini Liu & Liang, 2011
Chlaenius noguchii Bates, 1873
Chlaenius peruanus Erichson, 1847
Chlaenius prasinus Dejean, 1826
Chlaenius propeagilis Liu & Kavanaugh, 2011
Chlaenius purpureus Chaudoir, 1876
Chlaenius rambouseki Lutshnik, 1933
Chlaenius solitarius Say, 1823
Chlaenius wrasei (Kirschenhofer, 1997)
Subgenus Lomasa Andrewes, 1919
Chlaenius xanthacrus Wiedemann, 1823
Subgenus Macrochlaenites Kuntzen, 1919
Chlaenius alexanderdostali Kirschenhofer, 2008
Chlaenius hostilis Putzeys, 1880
Chlaenius humphreyi Alluaud, 1927
Chlaenius lugens Chaudoir, 1876
Chlaenius morio Boheman, 1860
Chlaenius nigrita Dejean, 1826
Chlaenius sennaariensis Chaudoir, 1856
Chlaenius surdipennis (Jeannel, 1949)
Chlaenius waddellii Murray, 1858
Subgenus Metachlaeniodus Jeannel, 1949
Chlaenius holomelas (Alluaud, 1915)
Subgenus Naelichus Lutshnik, 1933
Chlaenius stschukini Ménétriés, 1837
Subgenus Ocybatus LaFerté-Sénectère, 1851
Chlaenius berndjaegeri Kirschenhofer, 2008
Chlaenius bohemani Chaudoir, 1856
Chlaenius boueti (Jeannel, 1949)
Chlaenius bulirschi Kirschenhofer, 2010
Chlaenius decorsei Alluaud, 1916
Chlaenius deyrollei (LaFerté-Sénectère, 1851)
Chlaenius dhawalagiriensis Kirschenhofer, 2002
Chlaenius discicollis (LaFerté-Sénectère, 1851)
Chlaenius dissidens Péringuey, 1926
Chlaenius ditulus Péringuey, 1904
Chlaenius djaina Maindron, 1899
Chlaenius eggeri Kirschenhofer, 2011
Chlaenius exilis Andrewes, 1923
Chlaenius gunganagarensis Kirschenhofer, 2009
Chlaenius hornburgi Kirschenhofer, 2008
Chlaenius junceus Andrewes, 1923
Chlaenius latipalpis Mandl, 1992
Chlaenius lijiangensis Anichtchenko & Kirschenhofer, 2016
Chlaenius maputoensis Kirschenhofer, 2007
Chlaenius marleyi Barker, 1922
Chlaenius medioguttatus Chaudoir, 1876
Chlaenius moraveci Kirschenhofer, 2009
Chlaenius newdehliensis Kirschenhofer, 2002
Chlaenius orbicollis Chaudoir, 1876
Chlaenius orbiculicollis Barker, 1922
Chlaenius pailin Kirschenhofer, 2011
Chlaenius patrizii (Basilewsky, 1953)
Chlaenius pauxillus Kirschenhofer, 2002
Chlaenius pleuroderus Chaudoir, 1883
Chlaenius rampurensis Kirschenhofer, 2009
Chlaenius rebellis Péringuey, 1926
Chlaenius reichei (LaFerté-Sénectère, 1851)
Chlaenius rubricrus Alluaud, 1916
Chlaenius schuelei Kirschenhofer, 2007
Chlaenius spathulifer Bates, 1873
Chlaenius taiwanensis Kirschenhofer, 2014
Chlaenius tecospilus Alluaud, 1933
Chlaenius tenuis Fairmaire, 1901
Chlaenius vinhphuensis Kirschenhofer, 2009
Chlaenius vulneratus Dejean, 1831
Chlaenius wittei (Basilewsky, 1953)
Subgenus Oochlaenius Alluaud, 1933
Chlaenius kivuensis Alluaud, 1933
Subgenus Orinochlaenius Basilewsky, 1950
Chlaenius wittei Burgeon, 1937
Subgenus Pachydinodes Kuntzen, 1919
Chlaenius abstersus Bates, 1873
Chlaenius betrokaensis Kirschenhofer, 2009
Chlaenius bipustulatus Boheman, 1848
Chlaenius bisignatus Dejean, 1826
Chlaenius chomthongensis Kirschenhofer, 2002
Chlaenius conformis Dejean, 1831
Chlaenius controversus Péringuey, 1926
Chlaenius dajuensis Kirschenhofer, 2002
Chlaenius diephelus Alluaud, 1934
Chlaenius eruditus Kirschenhofer, 2002
Chlaenius feronoides Murray, 1858
Chlaenius fouquei Kirschenhofer, 2016
Chlaenius glabricollis Dejean, 1831
Chlaenius hamatus Dejean, 1831
Chlaenius hamifer Chaudoir, 1856
Chlaenius horaki Kirschenhofer, 2015
Chlaenius ikedai Kasahara, 1991
Chlaenius insulanus Louwerens, 1956
Chlaenius janus Kirschenhofer, 2002
Chlaenius kanarae Andrewes, 1919
Chlaenius leucops (Wiedemann, 1823)
Chlaenius lunatus Dejean, 1826
Chlaenius madecassus Csiki, 1931
Chlaenius malcheri Emden, 1937
Chlaenius maowensis Kirschenhofer, 2008
Chlaenius mederici Kirschenhofer, 2015
Chlaenius multicolor Andrewes, 1919
Chlaenius obenbergeri Jedlicka, 1935
Chlaenius ophonoides Fairmaire, 1843
Chlaenius ovalipennis Quedenfeldt, 1883
Chlaenius pandagensis Kirschenhofer, 2002
Chlaenius paromius Basilewsky, 1949
Chlaenius pictus Chaudoir, 1856
Chlaenius posticus (Fabricius, 1798)
Chlaenius pubifer Chaudoir, 1876
Chlaenius radama Künckel d'Herculais, 1891
Chlaenius rajasthanensis Kirschenhofer, 2002
Chlaenius sagittarius Dejean, 1831
Chlaenius siccus Darlington, 1968
Chlaenius simplex Wiedemann, 1821
Chlaenius sokotranus Csiki, 1931
Chlaenius suberbiei (Jeannel, 1949)
Chlaenius tansaniensis Kirschenhofer, 2011
Chlaenius taveuniensis Kirschenhofer, 2016
Chlaenius tiomanensis Kirschenhofer, 2015
Chlaenius virgulatus (Jeannel, 1949)
Chlaenius virgulifer Chaudoir, 1876
Chlaenius wenchuanensis Kirschenhofer, 2008
Subgenus Paracallistoides Basilewsky, 1965
Chlaenius anischenkoi (Kirschenhofer, 2010)
Chlaenius ernesti Gory, 1833
Chlaenius freynei Burgeon, 1937
Chlaenius fulvicollis Chaudoir, 1876
Chlaenius kirki Chaudoir, 1876
Chlaenius luluanus (Basilewsky, 1949)
Chlaenius maxi Gory, 1833
Chlaenius notula (Fabricius, 1801)
Chlaenius opistographus Alluaud, 1934
Chlaenius sassanus Alluaud, 1934
Chlaenius watsaensis Burgeon, 1935
Subgenus Paralissauchenius Kirschenhofer, 2002
Chlaenius chuji Jedlicka, 1946
Chlaenius jaegeri Kirschenhofer, 2002
Chlaenius posticemaculatus Kirschenhofer, 2002
Subgenus Pelasmomimus Grundmann, 1955
Chlaenius australis Dejean, 1831
Chlaenius greyanus White, 1841
Subgenus Pleroticus Péringuey, 1896
Chlaenius buquetii (Dejean & Boisduval, 1830)
Chlaenius dianus Jedlicka, 1957
Chlaenius lucidulus (Boheman, 1848)
Chlaenius schoenherri (Dejean, 1831)
Chlaenius sumptuosus Alluaud, 1934
Subgenus Prochlaeniellus Basilewsky, 1965
Chlaenius boromo Kirschenhofer, 2009
Chlaenius limbatus Wiedemann, 1821
Chlaenius limbipennis Boheman, 1860
Chlaenius marginipennis Gory, 1833
Chlaenius peringueyi Kuntzen, 1919
Chlaenius somaliae Basilewsky, 1956
Chlaenius somereni Alluaud, 1929
Subgenus Pseudanomoglossus R.T.Bell, 1960
Chlaenius maxillosus G.Horn, 1876
Subgenus Pseudochlaeniellus Jeannel, 1949
Chlaenius caesitius Andrewes, 1923
Chlaenius celer Chaudoir, 1876
Chlaenius contractus Chaudoir, 1876
Chlaenius cribricollis Dejean, 1831
Chlaenius davidsoni Mandl, 1978
Chlaenius germanus Chaudoir, 1876
Chlaenius iranensis Kirschenhofer, 1998
Chlaenius juvencus Dejean, 1831
Chlaenius lomsakensis Kirschenhofer, 1998
Chlaenius lucasii Peyron, 1858
Chlaenius luteoapicalis Facchini, 2011
Chlaenius neochloodes Lorenz, 1998
Chlaenius nigrosuturatus Mandl, 1978
Chlaenius paenulatus Erichson, 1843
Chlaenius puncticollis Dejean, 1826
Chlaenius retropictus Fairmaire, 1901
Chlaenius rotundatulus Lorenz, 1998
Chlaenius sobrinus Dejean, 1826
Chlaenius startellus Basilewsky, 1949
Chlaenius tenellus Klug, 1832
Chlaenius togatus Klug, 1829
Chlaenius waterbergensis Kirschenhofer, 2014
Subgenus Randallius Bousquet, 2012
Chlaenius purpuricollis Randall, 1838
Subgenus Rhopalopalpus LaFerté-Sénectère, 1851
Chlaenius janthinus Kollar & L.Redtenbacher, 1844
Subgenus Rhysotrachelus Boheman, 1848
Chlaenius adametzi Kuntzen, 1913
Chlaenius conradsi Kuntzen, 1913
Chlaenius crudelis Péringuey, 1896
Chlaenius dispreticus (Basilewsky, 1968)
Chlaenius eryx Kirschenhofer, 2009
Chlaenius eugrammus Basilewsky, 1947
Chlaenius exaratus (Basilewsky, 1949)
Chlaenius garnerae Kirschenhofer, 2016
Chlaenius immaculatus Péringuey, 1885
Chlaenius insignis Chaudoir, 1876
Chlaenius jos Kirschenhofer, 2009
Chlaenius mediornatus (Basilewsky, 1956)
Chlaenius nakuruensis Kirschenhofer, 2012
Chlaenius nepalensis Hope, 1831
Chlaenius nyassaensis Jedlicka, 1957
Chlaenius parepus Jedlicka, 1957
Chlaenius patricius Harold, 1879
Chlaenius paulyi Kirschenhofer, 2009
Chlaenius paykulli Crotch, 1871
Chlaenius quadrimaculatus (Boheman, 1848)
Chlaenius sangaicus Alluaud, 1929
Chlaenius savanicola (Basilewsky, 1968)
Chlaenius teani Gestro, 1881
Chlaenius tetracelis Alluaud, 1933
Chlaenius transvaalensis Kirschenhofer, 2009
Chlaenius vietnami Jedlicka, 1966
Subgenus Sphodromimus Casale, 1984
Chlaenius burmanensis (Lassalle, 2001)
Chlaenius deuvei (Morvan, 1997)
Chlaenius donabaueri Zettel, 2020
Chlaenius flavofemoratus Laporte, 1834
Chlaenius hajeki (Kirschenhofer, 2012)
Chlaenius holzschuhi (Casale, 1984)
Chlaenius hunanus (Morvan, 1997)
Chlaenius laosensis (Kirschenhofer, 2012)
Chlaenius luzoensis (Brunk, 2015)
Chlaenius peterseni (Louwerens, 1967)
Chlaenius pilosus (Casale, 1984)
Chlaenius tamdaoensis Kirschenhofer, 2003
Chlaenius thailandensis (Morvan, 1992)
Chlaenius wrasei (Kirschenhofer, 2003)
Subgenus Stenochlaenius Reitter, 1908
Chlaenius coeruleus (Steven, 1809)
Chlaenius dostojevskii Tschitscherine, 1896
Chlaenius jaechi (Kirschenhofer, 1991)
Chlaenius kashmiricus (Grundmann, 1955)
Chlaenius lederi Reitter, 1888
Subgenus Terraleus Fairmaire, 1899
Chlaenius brevior (Fairmaire, 1901)
Chlaenius perrieri (Fairmaire, 1899)
Subgenus Tomochilus LaFerté-Sénectère, 1851
Chlaenius adagidensis Sternberg, 1908
Chlaenius alternans (Imhoff, 1843)
Chlaenius carbonatus Chaudoir, 1876
Chlaenius cupreocinctus Reiche, 1850
Chlaenius incognitus Kirschenhofer, 2009
Chlaenius kulti Basilewsky, 1949
Chlaenius palpalis LaFerté-Sénectère, 1851
Chlaenius pseudopalpalis Basilewsky, 1949
Chlaenius siffointei (Basilewsky, 1968)
Chlaenius trichrous Alluaud, 1918
Subgenus Trichochlaenius Seidlitz, 1887
Chlaenius aeneocephalus Dejean, 1826
Chlaenius aeratus (Quensel, 1806)
Chlaenius albissoni Reitter, 1908
Chlaenius basilimbatus (Grundmann, 1956)
Chlaenius chrysocephalus (P.Rossi, 1790)
Chlaenius cyaneus Brullé, 1835
Chlaenius dilutipes Reitter in F.Hauser, 1894
Chlaenius gotschii Chaudoir, 1846
Chlaenius infantulus Chaudoir, 1876
Chlaenius jakeschi Jedlicka, 1967
Chlaenius milleti Antoine, 1932
Chlaenius montanus Lucas, 1859
Chlaenius nebrioides (Antoine, 1961)
Chlaenius stevenii (Quensel, 1806)
Chlaenius virens Rambur, 1837
Subgenus Turanochlaenius Lutshnik, 1933
Chlaenius semicyaneus Solsky, 1874
Not assigned to subgenus
Chlaenius aberrans Bates, 1882
Chlaenius amplians Bates, 1891
Chlaenius analis (Olivier, 1795)
Chlaenius annulipes Bates, 1892
Chlaenius beatus Bates, 1891
Chlaenius betioky Kirschenhofer, 2015
Chlaenius bicolor Chaudoir, 1876
Chlaenius bottegoi Alluaud, 1933
Chlaenius cinctus (Fabricius, 1781)
Chlaenius corrosulus Bates, 1892
Chlaenius crenistriatus Chaudoir, 1876
Chlaenius doriae Chaudoir, 1876
Chlaenius gabonicus Gemminger & Harold, 1868
Chlaenius gemmingeri Ballion, 1869
Chlaenius gonospilus Walker, 1871
Chlaenius greensladei Darlington, 1971
Chlaenius guineensis Kolbe, 1883
Chlaenius infersus Péringuey, 1926
Chlaenius instabilis Raffray, 1886
Chlaenius luteicauda Chaudoir, 1876
Chlaenius maleci Kirschenhofer, 2013
Chlaenius manowianus Jedlicka, 1957
Chlaenius marianensis Darlington, 1970
Chlaenius neocaledonicus Chaudoir, 1883
Chlaenius oberthueri Sternberg, 1908
Chlaenius obliquatus Barker, 1922
Chlaenius occultus Sloane, 1907
Chlaenius ochroperas Bates, 1892
Chlaenius pacholatkoi Kirschenhofer, 2003
Chlaenius poecilinus Bates, 1892
Chlaenius privatus Bates, 1892
Chlaenius pterostichoides Andrewes, 1941
Chlaenius pugni Camerano, 1879
Chlaenius rufithorax Wiedemann, 1821
Chlaenius samoensis Csiki, 1915
Chlaenius specularis Emden, 1937
Chlaenius timorensis Darlington, 1971
Chlaenius titschacki Jedlicka, 1946
Chlaenius trigonotomoides Emden, 1928
Chlaenius victor Andrewes, 1928
Chlaenius viridanus Jedlicka, 1952
Chlaenius wallacei Chaudoir, 1876
Chlaenius yamdena Kirschenhofer, 2011
†Chlaenius electrinus Giebel, 1862
†Chlaenius furvus Zhang: Liu & Shangguan, 1989
†Chlaenius plicatipennis Wickham, 1917
†Chlaenius punctulatus G.Horn, 1876
†Chlaenius solitarius Deichmüller, 1886
