= Predator–prey reversal =

Symbiotic phenomenon

A beetle (Chlaenius circumscriptus) attacking and preying upon a treefrog (Hyla savignyi).

A water bug nymph (Lethocerus patruelis) attacking a fish (Pseudorasbora parva).

Predator–prey reversal is a biological interaction where an organism that is typically prey in the predation interaction instead acts as the predator. A variety of interactions are considered a role reversal. One type is where the prey confronts its predator and the interaction ends with no feeding. Two competing predators may interact and the larger predator will prey on the smaller. Smaller organisms may prey on larger organisms. Changing population densities may trigger a role reversal. In addition, adult prey may attack juvenile predators.

== Evolution theories ==
According to Georgia Institute of Technology research, prey and predator roles have cycles where the prey population may increase, thereby causing the predator population to increase as well. But sometimes the predator population overwhelms the prey to the point of devastating the prey population, subsequently resulting in a devastation of the predator population. Some studies indicate that the roles of each may become reversed to the point that prey begin to eat the predators. Using data collected regarding mink–muskrat, gyrfalcon–rock ptarmigan, and phage–Vibrio cholerae relationships, research was done to determine if a theory proposed by the Georgia Tech researchers could explain how and why this occurs.

Joshua Weitz, a professor at Georgia Tech's School of Biology who co-authored the study, said that particular phenotypes can show up as dominant depending upon changes in the environment around them. When both predator and prey are evolving at the same time, and the predator population has drastic effects on prey, the prey may realize they have the ability to overcome smaller numbers of predators and evolve to a predator-type role. Knowing how specific species interact with each other in this way enables scientists to study the impact of this on ecosystems in more advanced ways than with numerical data alone. They are able to determine why broad trends happen in ecological systems.

== Research and experiments ==
A model called the Lotka–Volterra model after its founders, Alfred J. Lotka and Vito Volterra, focuses on studies of ecology and demographics while attempting to explain why certain plant and animal interactions occur the way they do. Although created in the early 1900s, this model has proven to be flexible and adaptable, allowing it to continue being used today.

A study published in Royal Society Open Science worked to explain the reasons for the interactions between predator and prey as described in a literary work by Amos Barkai and Christopher McQuaid.

Algebraic equations and graphs were used to analyze data to reenact predator–prey reversal roles. The conclusion of this experiment showed that roles between species can reverse when the usual prey populations decrease to significantly low levels, causing the predators to decrease in population size also. Once this occurs, prey then begin to build up their population numbers and as they do, they prey on their original predators.

Understanding how ecosystems operate and the interactions that take place between individual species within ecosystems is predicted to be of use when managing natural resources and wildlife within those ecosystems. According to this study, maintainable bionetworks can be established through more accurate anticipation of the reactions of species.

== Examples in nature ==
=== Size-recessive reversal ===
Amphibians often prey on beetle larvae. However, the ground beetle Epomis' larvae reverse this and prey exclusively on the amphibians that are trying to consume them. Two species of Epomis (E. circumscriptus and E. dejeani) use the amphibian's predation behavior to their advantage by luring the amphibian to them. "The Epomis larva combines a sit-and-wait strategy with unique movements of its antennae and mandibles to draw the attention of the amphibian to the presence of a potential prey." Out of 400 tests, the larvae avoided the amphibian's tongue, and counterattacked by attaching to the body of the amphibian with an approximate 98% success rate. Once attached, the Epomis larvae begin to feed.

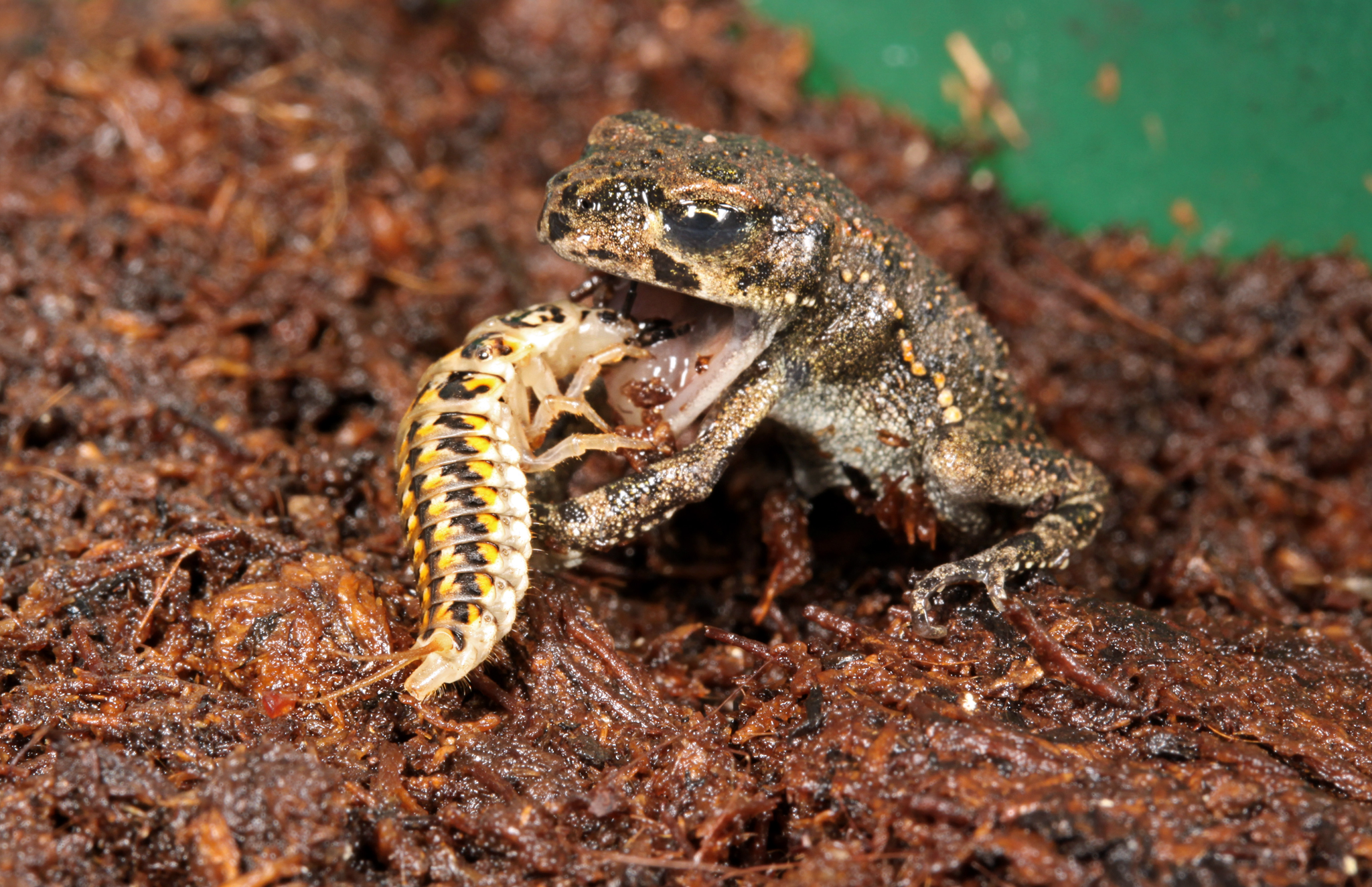
Epomis larva attached to the mouth of an amphibian

About 10% of predator–prey relationships have smaller organisms preying on larger ones. These are all active attacks though, unlike the Epomis larvae's strategy to lure the larger amphibian to them. Wizen and Gasith suggest that the strategy could have begun through evolution as an anti-predator defense, and later became the means of living for the larvae. The amphibians have not evolved to adjust for the Epomis larvae yet, as the majority of the animals they prey are an easy catch for the amphibians.

A species of South American ant has adapted the ability to hunt creatures that are up to 13,350 times their mean weight. The Azteca andreae ants have developed a physical hook that enables their ambushes: the ants are arboreal and ambush flying insects that land on their trees. Whenever a bug lands on the leaf, the ants spring into action: a small number bite down on the legs of the winged creature. While the bug is stuck and attached to the leaf, more ants come to dismember the prey. The average ant can hold up to 5,700 times its own body weight. The reason for this is suggested by a possible co-evolution between the Azteca andreae ants and the Cecropia obtusa leaves. The leaves have pronounced velcro-like loops that the ants are able to hook on to. The ants prevent other bugs from eating the leaves, while the leaves gives the often preyed-upon ants a predatory edge.

=== Juvenile predators and size-dominant reversal ===
The giant water bug Kirkaldyia deyrolli, in the subfamily Lethocerinae within the Belostomatidae, is an endangered species native to Japan that primarily feeds on small frogs and fish. Dr. Shin-ya Ohba has captured photos of K. deyrolli eating outside of its known primary diet. A 58mm male water bug was found consuming a juvenile Reeves turtle during a nighttime sampling. Dr. Ohba has found K. deyrolli eating snakes, another rare behavior for the water bug.

The hunting of juveniles has developed as an effective anti-predator strategy and role reversal. Young predators are at risk from members of their own species and competitors, and they may also be vulnerable to adults of prey species, as young predators pose nearly no predation risk to adult prey. An experiment where juvenile prey were exposed to adult predators while they developed were more likely to kill juvenile predators as adults than prey that was not exposed as juveniles. Increased levels of attack against juvenile predators can deter the adult predators, as the adult predators will avoid locations where their young may be attacked. This in turn reduces the risk of predation on the prey species.

An experiment with mites as predators and thrips as prey showed that even juvenile prey can attack juvenile predators. These attacks triggered a parental care response in adult predators, who killed juvenile prey that attacked their young. This created a "cascade of predator attack, prey counterattack and predator defence".

=== Predator competition ===
A more common reversal is interspecific killing among predators. Some species may experience 68% of their known mortalities from being killed by other predators. It is possible that one predator species may kill another and not the other way around, or both species may kill each other. Killing among predators can reduce populations, even to the point of extinction, and may reduce or enhance prey populations.

=== Changing population densities ===
Two islands off the west coast of South Africa have very different seafloor ecosystems.

On Malgas Island, the population is mostly seaweed and rock lobsters. Rock lobsters act as predators, preying on mussels that try to settle. The lobsters also prey on whelks, except for one species, Burnupena papyracea, the shell of which is usually encrusted with a commensal bryozoan.

In contrast, Marcus Island has a large mussel population, and almost no seaweed or rock lobsters. Whelks, Burnupena spp also have a large population density at Marcus Island. Rock lobsters brought to Marcus Island were quickly consumed by the whelks, which outnumbered them. This interaction showed a role reversal between a prey species (the whelk), and a predator species (the rock lobster).

== In pop culture ==
Predator–prey reversal is a plot theme in numerous books and movies; it is one version of the story of the underdog who comes back from improbable odds and succeeds against a vastly superior foe, from Bram Stoker's Dracula to children's movies such as Monsters University.

The 1987 film Predator is an example of prey-reversal where the victim becomes the predator. Armed with a stealth suit and ultimate high-tech gear, the predator methodically dispatches the humans that find themselves in the jungle. The last of his squad, "Dutch" (Arnold Schwarzenegger) must turn from the hunted, into the hunter. The prey actively confronts its predator.
