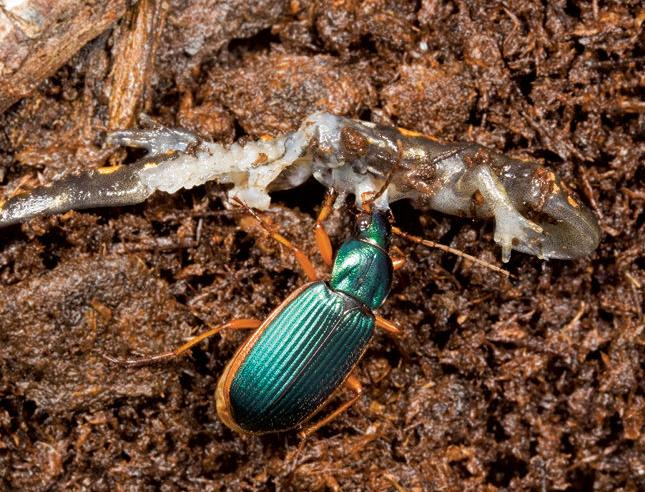
- Chlaenius dejeanii eating a southern banded newt, Ommatotriton vittatus

Scientific classification
- Kingdom: Animalia
- Phylum: Arthropoda
- Class: Insecta
- Order: Coleoptera
- Suborder: Adephaga
- Family: Carabidae
- Subfamily: Harpalinae
- Genus: Chlaenius
- Subgenus: Epomis; Bonelli, 1810

= Epomis =

Subgenus of beetles

Chlaenius circumscriptus preying upon a tree frog, Hyla savignyi

Epomis is a subgenus of ground beetle genus Chlaenius. The larvae of this subgenus are notable for being obligate role-reversal predators. Amphibians such as frogs are normally predators of beetles; however, Epomis larvae feed exclusively on amphibians.

== Description ==
Epomis beetles are often metallic blue- or green-colored, with a striking yellow-orange rim on the elytra and mostly yellow-colored legs and antennae. They are 15–26 mm (0.59–1.02 in) in length. Members of the Epomis subgenus can be distinguished from other species of Chlaenius by the short (less than three times as long as wide) and triangular labial palps.

The larvae reach a body length up to 20 mm (0.79 in), they are white or yellow colored, with black and orange markings. Like many ground beetle larvae, they are elongated with two extensions (urogomphi) at the rear end. They have characteristic double-hooked mandibles. Larvae of the two European species can be distinguished by their color patterns.

== Feeding behavior ==
Epomis larvae hunt in a rare reversal of the usual predator-prey relationship between amphibians and insects. They lure their amphibian predators by making prey-like movements, then evade the predator's attack and disable the predator, often with a bite to the throat or underside. After the attack, the larva stays attached to the amphibian while feeding on it, similarly to external parasites. Adult Epomis beetles are generalist predators but can also feed on amphibians. They sneak up behind their victims, and hold on firmly using their legs. To paralyze the victim, the beetle makes an incision in the pelvic region with its mandibles. The incision apparently cuts leg muscles. The amphibian loses its ability to move and is eaten by the beetle. Scientists speculate that Epomis evolved this behavior as an aggressive evasion tactic in response to predation by amphibians and the success of this tactic led to Epomis becoming an obligate predator, itself.

Chlaenius circumscriptus larva displaying luring movements of antennae and mouthparts

A juvenile toad is attracted and lured to an ambushing Chlaenius dejeani larva

== Taxonomic status ==
The subgenus Epomis belongs to the genus Chlaenius of the tribe Chlaeniini, subfamily Licininae, which consists of species associated with swamps, temporary ponds, and similar types of wetland habitats. It contains about 30 species distributed in the Old World only, with the majority of species occurring in the Afrotropical region. Epomis was formerly considered a genus of the tribe Chlaeniini rather than a subgenus of Chlaenius.

== Species ==
These 28 species belong to the subgenus Epomis:

- Chlaenius alluaudi Fairmaire, 1901 (Madagascar)
- Chlaenius amarae Andrewes, 1920 (Southwest Asia)
- Chlaenius barkeri Csiki, 1931
- Chlaenius bocandei (LaFerté-Sénectère, 1852) (Africa)
- Chlaenius circumscriptus (Duftschmid, 1812) (Europe, Africa, Asia)
- Chlaenius croesus (Fabricius, 1801) (Africa)
- Chlaenius croyi Kirschenhofer, 2003 (Africa)
- Chlaenius daressalaami Jedlicka, 1957 (Tanzania)
- Chlaenius dejeanii (Dejean, 1831) (Europe)
- Chlaenius deplanatus (LaFerté-Sénectère, 1851) (Africa)
- Chlaenius duvaucelii (Dejean, 1831) (India)
- Chlaenius elisabethanus Burgeon, 1935 (Africa)
- Chlaenius elongatus (Klug, 1833) (Madagascar)
- Chlaenius fimbriatus (Klug, 1833) (Madagascar)
- Chlaenius immunitus Murray, 1858 (Africa)
- Chlaenius jordani (Basilewsky, 1955) (Tanzania)
- Chlaenius kenyerii Kirschenhofer, 2003 (China)
- Chlaenius lastii Bates, 1886 (Africa)
- Chlaenius latreillei (LaFerté-Sénectère, 1852) (Africa)
- Chlaenius loveridgei (Basilewsky, 1951) (Tanzania)
- Chlaenius nigricans Wiedemann, 1821 (South and East Asia)
- Chlaenius nossibianus Facchini, 2011 (Madagascar)
- Chlaenius protensus Chaudoir, 1876 (Africa)
- Chlaenius rhodesianus Péringuey, 1898 (Africa)
- Chlaenius simba Alluaud, 1929 (Africa)
- Chlaenius tschitscherini Jedlicka, 1952
- Chlaenius vientianensis Kirschenhofer, 2009 (Laos)
- Chlaenius violaceipennis Chaudoir, 1876 (Africa)
