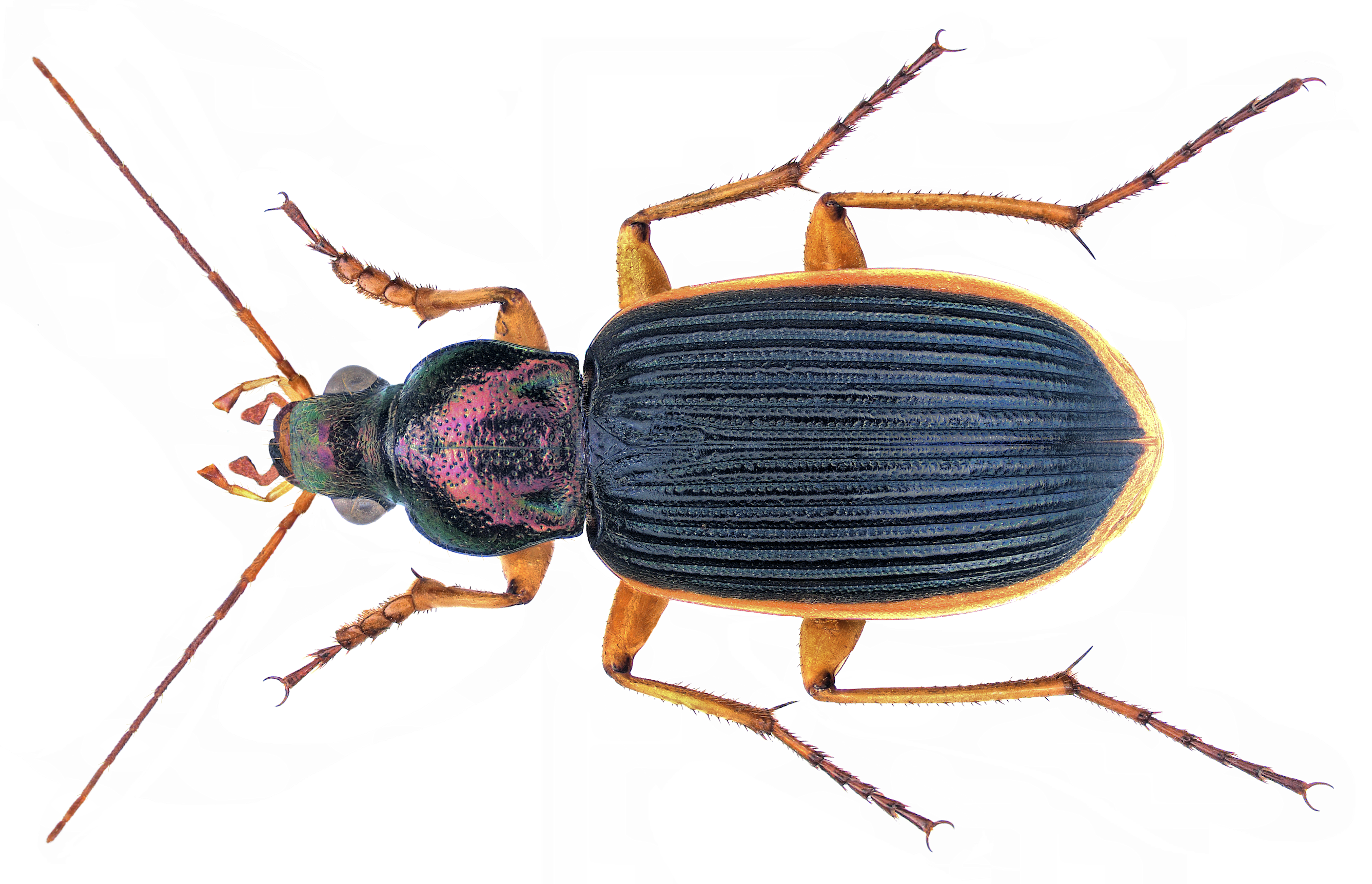
- Chlaenius nigricans, India

Scientific classification
- Kingdom: Animalia
- Phylum: Arthropoda
- Clade: Pancrustacea
- Class: Insecta
- Order: Coleoptera
- Suborder: Adephaga
- Family: Carabidae
- Genus: Chlaenius
- Subgenus: Epomis
- Species: C. nigricans

Binomial name
- Chlaenius nigricans (Wiedemann, 1821)

Synonyms
- Epomis nigricans Wiedemann, 1821

= Chlaenius nigricans =

Species of beetle

Chlaenius nigricans is a species of ground beetle native to the Palearctic. It is known from Borneo, China, India, Indonesia, Japan, Myanmar, North Korea, South Korea, Sri Lanka, and Taiwan.

Adult beetles are metallic copper-green colored, with a striking yellow-orange rim on the elytra and mostly yellow-colored legs and antennae. They are 19.5-22 millimeters in length.

The larvae reach a body length of up to 20 millimeters. They are yellow with black markings. Like many ground beetle larvae they are elongated with two extensions (OroGomphi) at the rear end. They have characteristic double-hooked mandibles. The larvae feed exclusively on amphibians, which they lure by making prey-like movements. The adult beetles are generalist predators, but can also feed on amphibians much larger than themselves.
