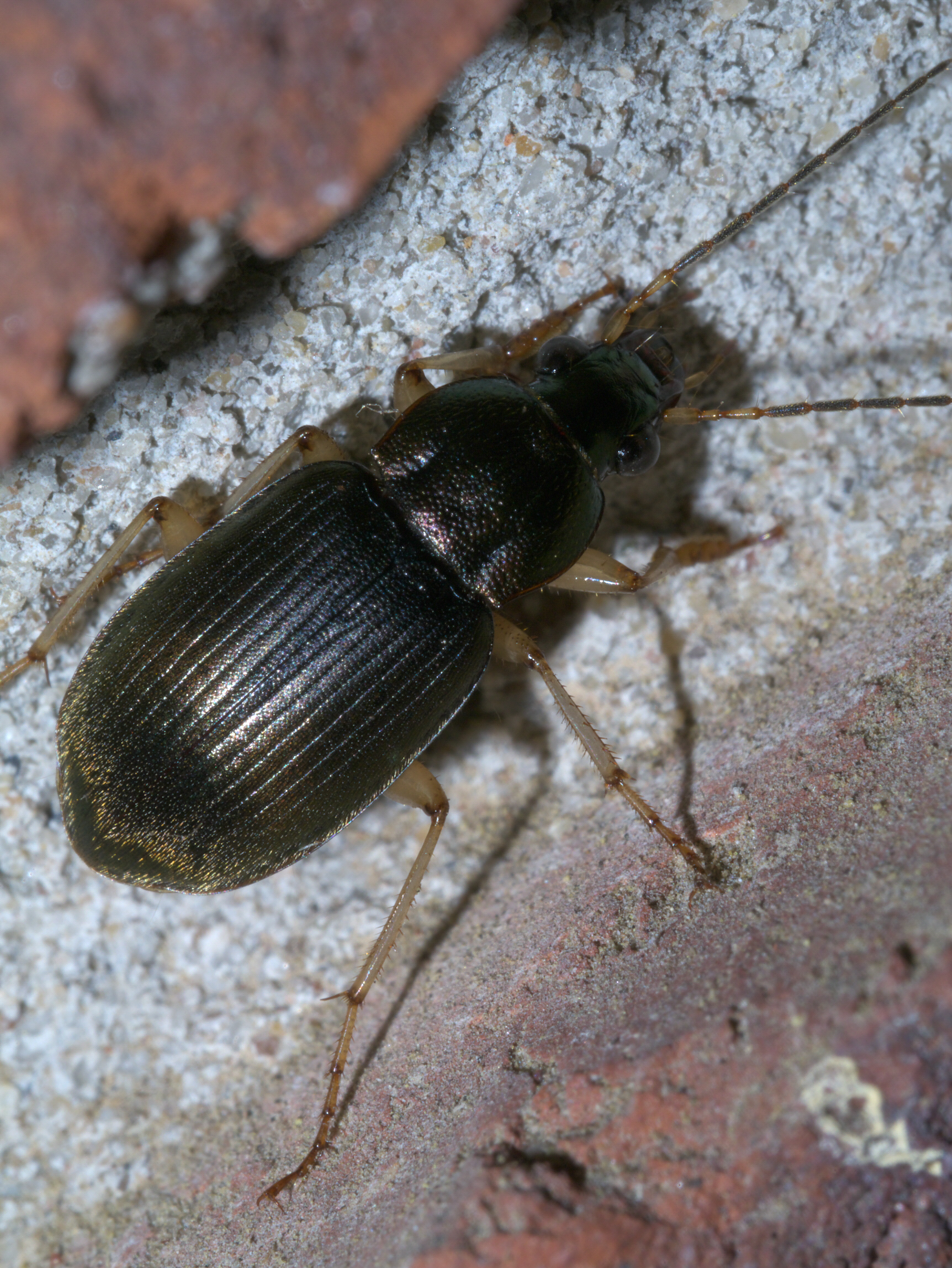

Scientific classification
- Kingdom: Animalia
- Phylum: Arthropoda
- Clade: Pancrustacea
- Class: Insecta
- Order: Coleoptera
- Suborder: Adephaga
- Family: Carabidae
- Genus: Chlaenius
- Species: C. circumcinctus

Binomial name
- Chlaenius circumcinctus Say, 1830

Synonyms
- Chlaenius perplexus Dejean, 1831

= Chlaenius circumcinctus =

Species of beetle

Chlaenius circumcinctus is a species of ground beetle in the family Carabidae. It is found in North America.
