= Chlaenius croesus =

Scientific classification
- Kingdom: Animalia
- Phylum: Arthropoda
- Clade: Pancrustacea
- Class: Insecta
- Order: Coleoptera
- Suborder: Adephaga
- Family: Carabidae
- Genus: Chlaenius
- Subgenus: Epomis
- Species: C. croesus

Binomial name
- Chlaenius croesus (Fabricius, 1801)

Species of beetle

Chlaenius croesus is a species of ground beetle in the family Carabidae, found in Africa. It is a member of the subgenus Epomis, the larvae of which are notable for being obligate role-reversal predators. Amphibians such as frogs are normally predators of beetles; however, Epomis larvae feed exclusively on amphibians.

== See also ==
Epomis, subgenus of Chlaenius.
