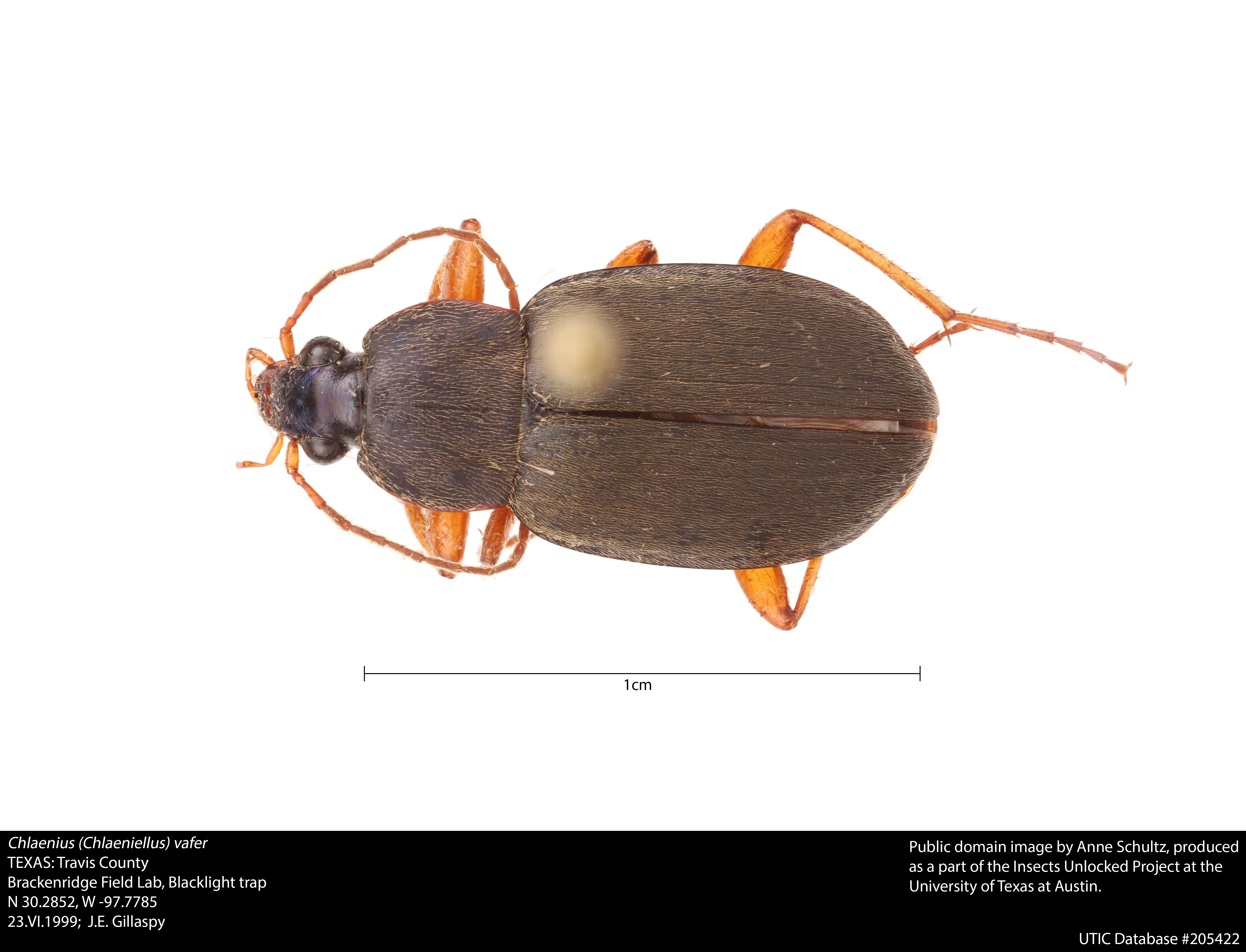

Scientific classification
- Kingdom: Animalia
- Phylum: Arthropoda
- Clade: Pancrustacea
- Class: Insecta
- Order: Coleoptera
- Suborder: Adephaga
- Family: Carabidae
- Genus: Chlaenius
- Species: C. vafer

Binomial name
- Chlaenius vafer LeConte, 1852

= Chlaenius vafer =

Species of beetle

Chlaenius vafer is a species of ground beetle in the family Carabidae. It is found in North America.
