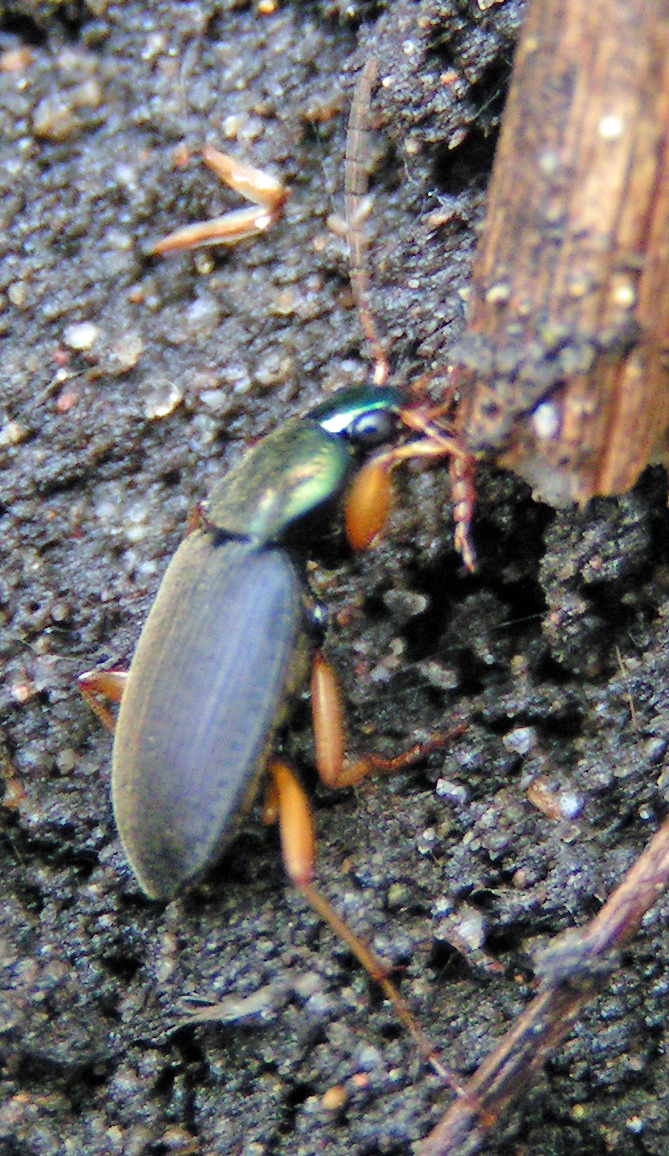

Scientific classification
- Kingdom: Animalia
- Phylum: Arthropoda
- Clade: Pancrustacea
- Class: Insecta
- Order: Coleoptera
- Suborder: Adephaga
- Family: Carabidae
- Genus: Chlaenius
- Species: C. sericeus

Binomial name
- Chlaenius sericeus (Forster, 1771)

= Chlaenius sericeus =

Species of beetle

Chlaenius sericeus is a species in the beetle family Carabidae. It is found in the United States and Canada.
