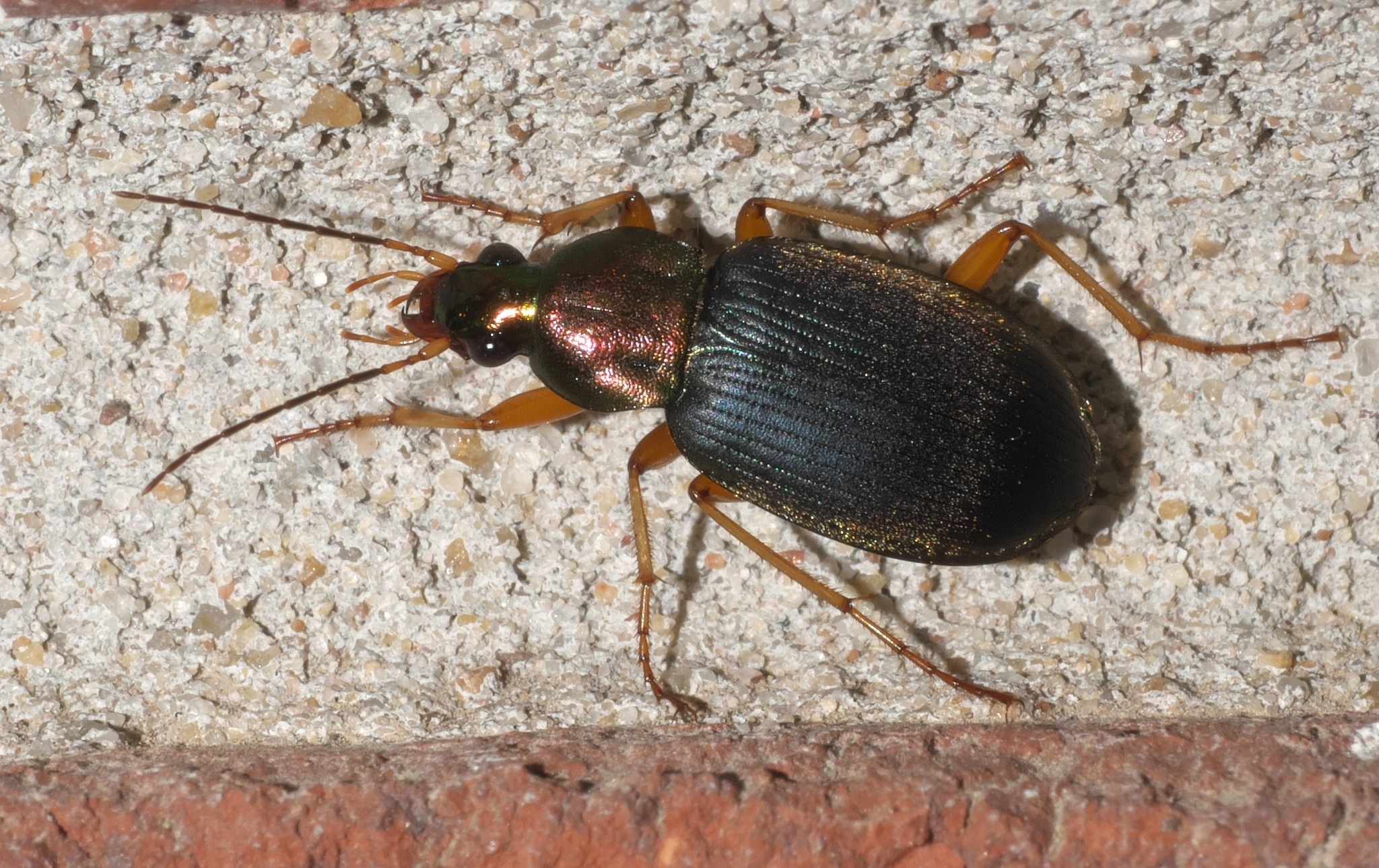
- Chlaenius tricolor, Oklahoma

Scientific classification
- Kingdom: Animalia
- Phylum: Arthropoda
- Class: Insecta
- Order: Coleoptera
- Suborder: Adephaga
- Family: Carabidae
- Subfamily: Harpalinae
- Tribe: Chlaeniini
- Genus: Chlaenius
- Species: C. tricolor

Binomial name
- Chlaenius tricolor Dejean, 1826

= Chlaenius tricolor =

Species of beetle

Chlaenius tricolor is a species of vivid metallic ground beetle in the family Carabidae. It is found from southern Canada south to Guatemala.

== Subspecies ==
These two subspecies belong to the species Chlaenius tricolor:

- Chlaenius tricolor tricolor Dejean, 1826 (widespread east of the Rocky Mountains, Canada south to Georgia)
- Chlaenius tricolor vigilans Say, 1830 (west of the Rocky Mountains; British Columbia south to Guatemala)
