= Chlaenius extensus =

Scientific classification
- Kingdom: Animalia
- Phylum: Arthropoda
- Clade: Pancrustacea
- Class: Insecta
- Order: Coleoptera
- Suborder: Adephaga
- Family: Carabidae
- Genus: Chlaenius; Bonelli, 1810
- Species: C. extensus

Binomial name
- Chlaenius extensus Mannerheim, 1825

Species of beetle

Chlaenius extensus is a species of ground beetle in the large and diverse genus of Chlaenius.
