= Chlaenius elegans =

Scientific classification
- Kingdom: Animalia
- Phylum: Arthropoda
- Clade: Pancrustacea
- Class: Insecta
- Order: Coleoptera
- Suborder: Adephaga
- Family: Carabidae
- Genus: Chlaenius
- Species: C. elegans

Binomial name
- Chlaenius elegans (Schmidt-Goebel, 1846)

Species of beetle

Chlaenius elegans is a species of ground beetle in the family Carabidae.
