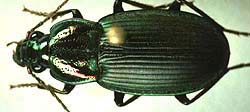

Scientific classification
- Kingdom: Animalia
- Phylum: Arthropoda
- Clade: Pancrustacea
- Class: Insecta
- Order: Coleoptera
- Suborder: Adephaga
- Family: Carabidae
- Genus: Chlaenius
- Species: C. pimalicus

Binomial name
- Chlaenius pimalicus Casey, 1914

= Chlaenius pimalicus =

Species of beetle

Chlaenius pimalicus is a species of ground beetle in the family Carabidae. It is found in North America.
