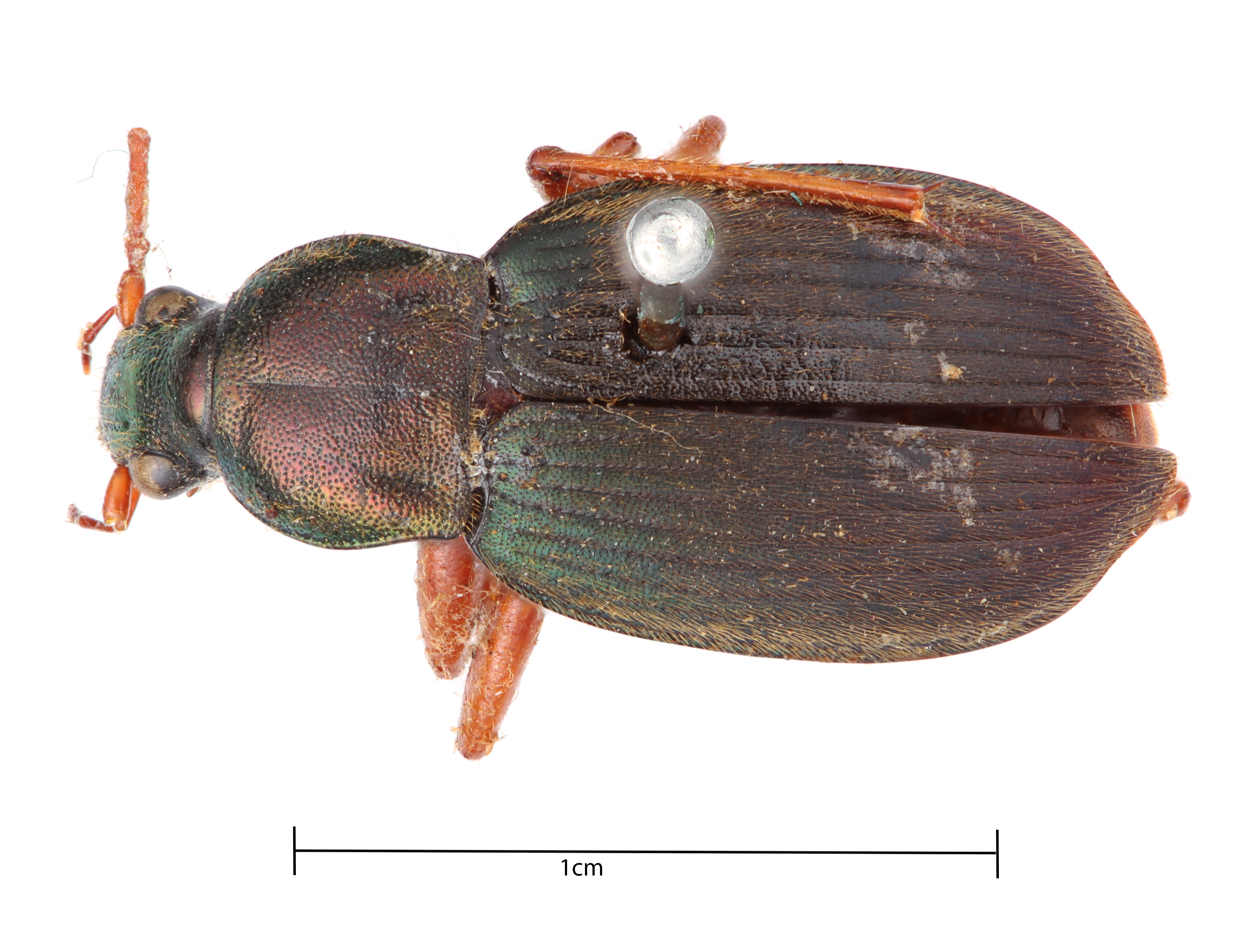

Scientific classification
- Kingdom: Animalia
- Phylum: Arthropoda
- Clade: Pancrustacea
- Class: Insecta
- Order: Coleoptera
- Suborder: Adephaga
- Family: Carabidae
- Genus: Chlaenius
- Species: C. aestivus

Binomial name
- Chlaenius aestivus Say, 1823

= Chlaenius aestivus =

Species of beetle

Chlaenius aestivus is a species of beetle in the genus Chlaenius.

== Description ==
C. aestivus is a large species of ground beetle with orange legs. It has an iridescent thorax and head, which is characteristic of the genus. The elytra, which are black, are imprinted with grooves, and the thorax is densely punctured.

== Habitat ==
This species is often found under rocks, logs and other debris during the day in moist areas, such as muddy bottomlands.

== Identification ==
This species is distinguished from similar species by the antennae. Anntenomere 3 is longer than 1+2 and 4.

== Eggs ==
Eggs are laid in mud cells attached to grasses.
