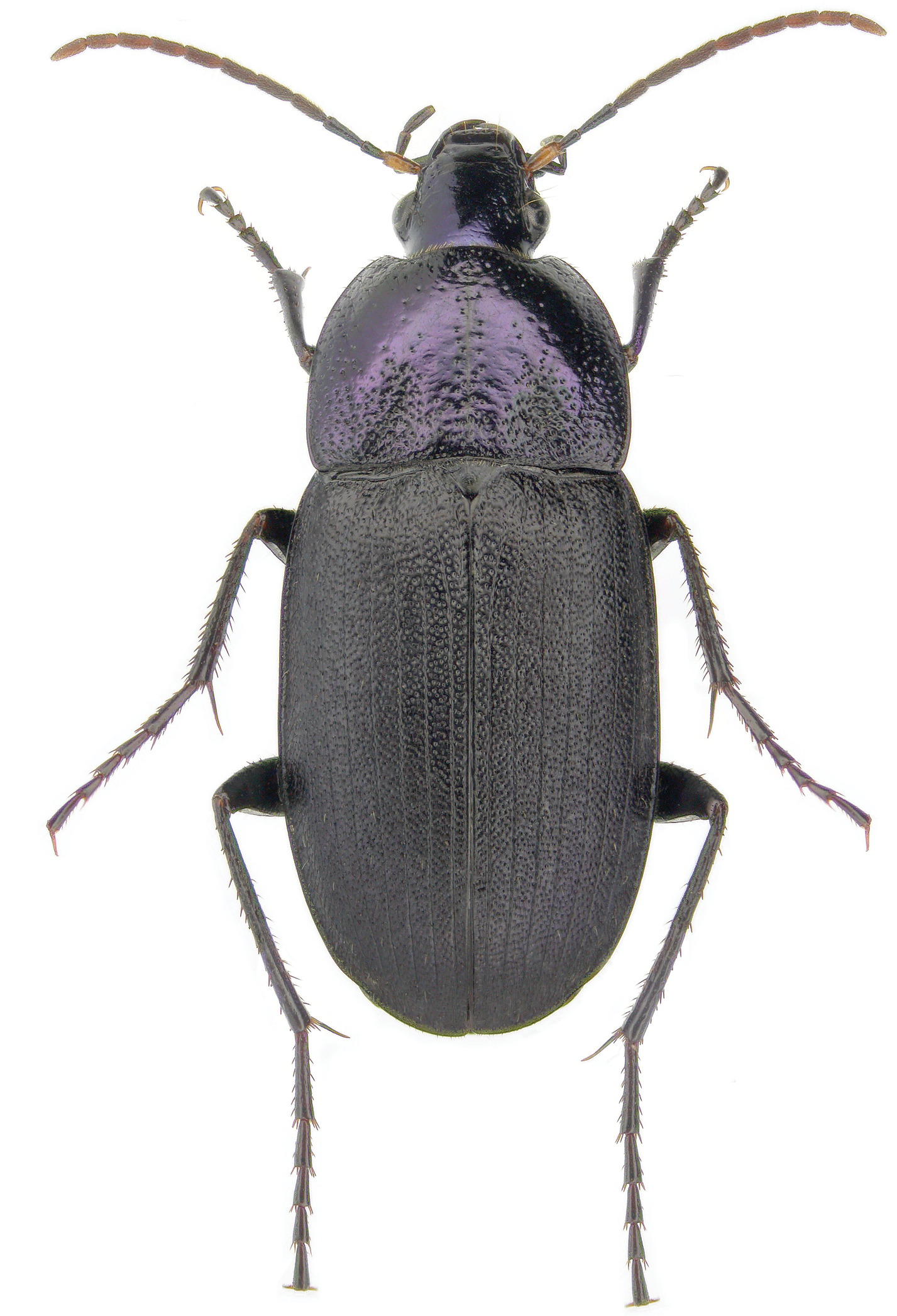

Scientific classification
- Kingdom: Animalia
- Phylum: Arthropoda
- Clade: Pancrustacea
- Class: Insecta
- Order: Coleoptera
- Suborder: Adephaga
- Family: Carabidae
- Genus: Chlaenius
- Species: C. purpuricollis

Binomial name
- Chlaenius purpuricollis Randall, 1838

= Chlaenius purpuricollis =

Species of beetle

Chlaenius purpuricollis is a species of ground beetle in the large and diverse genus Chlaenius. It is found in the United States and Canada.
