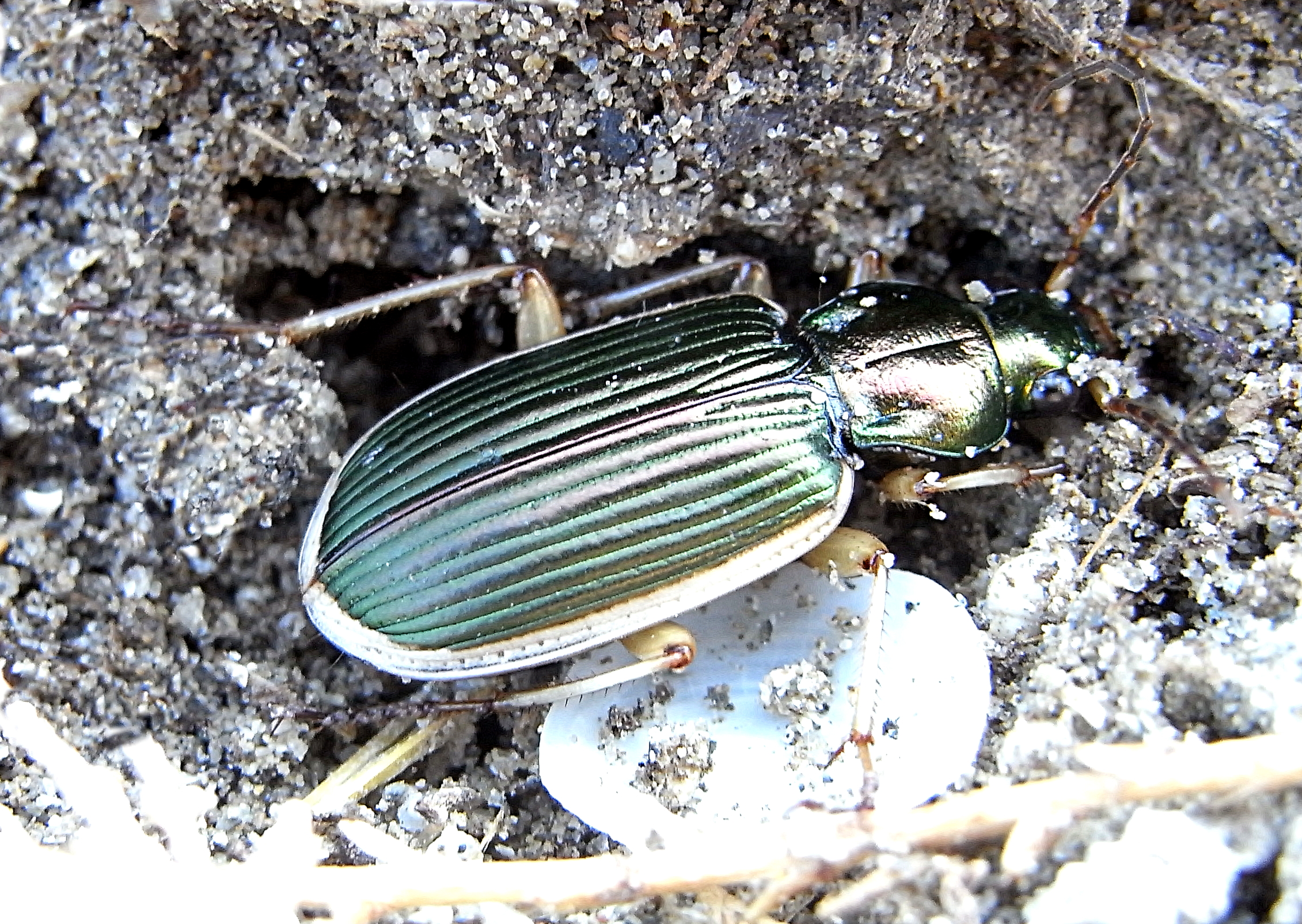

Scientific classification
- Kingdom: Animalia
- Phylum: Arthropoda
- Clade: Pancrustacea
- Class: Insecta
- Order: Coleoptera
- Suborder: Adephaga
- Family: Carabidae
- Genus: Chlaenius
- Species: C. spoliatus

Binomial name
- Chlaenius spoliatus (P. Rossi, 1792)

= Chlaenius spoliatus =

Species of beetle

Chlaenius spoliatus is a species of ground beetle native to the Palearctic (including Europe), the Near East, and North Africa. In Europe, it is found in Albania, Austria, the Balearic Islands, Bosnia and Herzegovina, Bulgaria, the Canary Islands, Corsica, Crete, Croatia, the Czech Republic, European Turkey, mainland France, mainland Greece, Hungary, mainland Italy, Moldova, North Macedonia, Poland, Romania, central and southern Russia, Sardinia, Sicily, Slovakia, Slovenia, mainland Spain, Ukraine, Yugoslavia.
