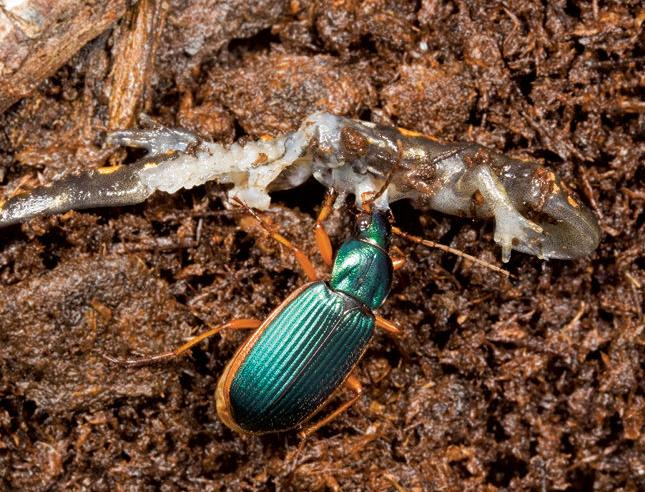
- Chlaenius dejeanii eating a southern banded newt, Ommatotriton vittatus

Scientific classification
- Kingdom: Animalia
- Phylum: Arthropoda
- Clade: Pancrustacea
- Class: Insecta
- Order: Coleoptera
- Suborder: Adephaga
- Family: Carabidae
- Genus: Chlaenius
- Subgenus: Epomis
- Species: C. dejeanii

Binomial name
- Chlaenius dejeanii (Dejean, 1831)

Synonyms
- Epomis dejeanii Dejean, 1831; Epomis dejeani Dejean, 1831

= Chlaenius dejeanii =

Species of beetle

Chlaenius dejeanii is a species of ground beetle native to the Palearctic and the Middle East. It is known from Bosnia and Herzegovina, Greece, Hungary, Israel, Italy, Russia, Syria, Turkey, and Ukraine.

This species was formerly in the genus Epomis, and is sometimes referred to as Epomis dejeanii.

Adult beetles are metallic blue or green-colored, with a striking yellow-orange rim on the elytra and mostly yellow-colored legs and antennae. They are 15 to 20 mm (0.6 to 0.8 in) in length.

The larvae reach a body length of up to 20 mm (0.8 in), they are yellow-colored with black markings. Like many ground beetle larvae they are elongated with two extensions (urogomphi) at the rear end. They have characteristic double-hooked mandibles. The larvae feed exclusively on amphibians, which they lure by waving their antennae and making prey-like movements. The larvae can often evade the first strike of the amphibian by being alert, and then strike back at once, while the amphibian is in close proximity. Latching on with their mandibles, they suck the body fluids of their new host, progressing to chewing its skin and eating its tissues. Eventually they may kill their host. Even if they are taken into the amphibian's mouth at the first strike, they may survive; one young frog appeared to find the larva it caught distasteful, failed to spit it out, swallowed it, only to regurgitate it a couple of hours later, covered with mucus but apparently unharmed. When the larvae molt, they drop off their host and need to find a new one.

The adult beetles are generalist predators and scavengers, but can also feed on amphibians much larger than themselves.
