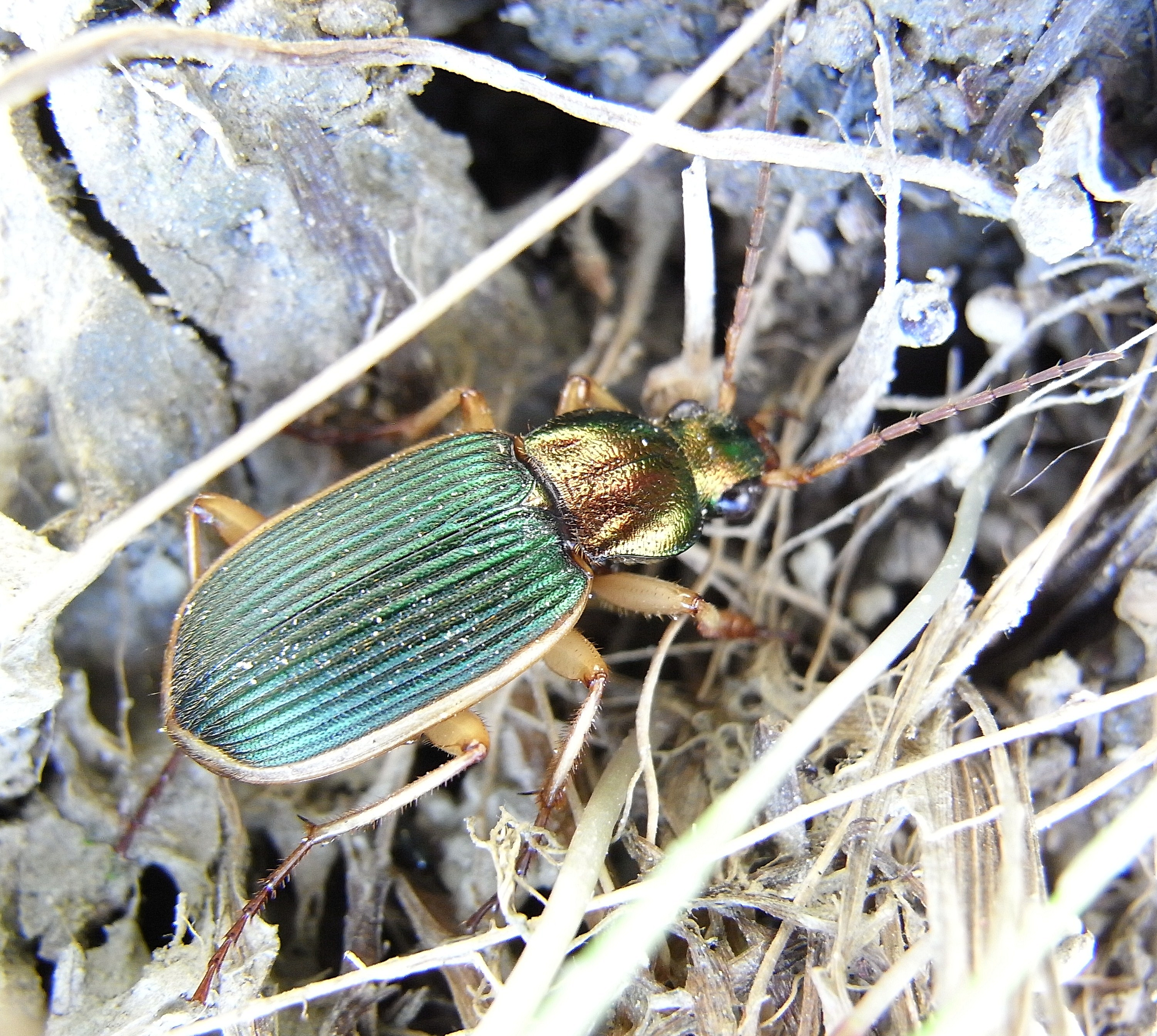
- In Hungary

Scientific classification
- Kingdom: Animalia
- Phylum: Arthropoda
- Clade: Pancrustacea
- Class: Insecta
- Order: Coleoptera
- Suborder: Adephaga
- Family: Carabidae
- Genus: Chlaenius
- Species: C. festivus

Binomial name
- Chlaenius festivus (Panzer, 1796)

= Chlaenius festivus =

Species of beetle

Chlaenius festivus is a species of ground beetle native to the Palearctic (including Europe) and the Near East. In Europe, it is found in Albania, Austria, the Balearic Islands (doubtful), Bosnia and Herzegovina, Bulgaria, Crete, Croatia, the Cyclades Islands, Cyprus, the Czech Republic, the Dodecanese Islands, European Turkey, mainland France, mainland Greece, Hungary, mainland Italy, Malta (doubtful), Moldova, North Macedonia, Poland, Romania, southern Russia, Slovakia, Slovenia, mainland Spain (doubtful), Ukraine, and Yugoslavia.
