= Chlaenius circumscriptus =

- Chlaenius circumscriptus preying upon a tree frog, Hyla savignyi

Scientific classification
- Kingdom: Animalia
- Phylum: Arthropoda
- Clade: Pancrustacea
- Class: Insecta
- Order: Coleoptera
- Suborder: Adephaga
- Family: Carabidae
- Subfamily: Harpalinae
- Tribe: Chlaeniini
- Genus: Chlaenius
- Species: C. circumscriptus

Binomial name
- Chlaenius circumscriptus (Duftschmid, 1812)

Synonyms
- Epomis circumscriptus Duftschmid, 1812

Species of beetle

Chlaenius circumscriptus is a species of ground beetle native to the Palearctic, the Near East, and North Africa.

This species was formerly called Epomis circumscriptus, a member of the genus Epomis.

== Distribution ==
It is known from Albania, Armenia, Bosnia and Herzegovina, Bulgaria, Croatia, Egypt, France, Georgia, Greece, Hungary, Israel, Italy, Jordan, Kazakhstan, Portugal, Romania, Russia, Slovakia, Spain, Tajikistan, Turkmenistan, Turkey, Ukraine, and Uzbekistan.

== Description and ecology ==
Adult beetles are metallic blue with violet luster, with a striking yellow-orange rim on the elytra and mostly yellow-colored legs and antennae. They are 18 to 22.5 mm (0.7 to 0.9 in) in length.

The larvae reach a body length of up to 20 millimeters, they are white or yellow colored, with black and orange markings. Like many ground beetle larvae they are elongated with two extensions (Urogomphi) at the rear end. They have characteristic double-hooked mandibles. The larvae feed exclusively on amphibians, which they lure by making prey-like movements. The larvae can often evade the first strike of the amphibian by being alert, and then strike back at once, while the amphibian is in close proximity. Latching on with their mandibles, they suck the body fluids of their new host, progressing to chewing its skin and eating its tissues. Eventually they may kill their host. Even if they are taken into the amphibian's mouth at the first strike, they may survive; one young frog appeared to find the larva it caught distasteful, failed to spit it out, swallowed it, only to regurgitate it a couple of hours later, covered with mucus but apparently unharmed. When the larvae molt, they drop off their host and need to find a new one. The adult beetles are generalist predators, but can also feed on amphibians much larger than themselves.
