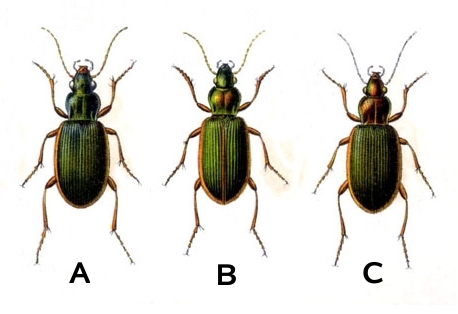
- A: C. velutinus; B: C. spoliatus; C: C. festivus

Scientific classification
- Kingdom: Animalia
- Phylum: Arthropoda
- Clade: Pancrustacea
- Class: Insecta
- Order: Coleoptera
- Suborder: Adephaga
- Family: Carabidae
- Subfamily: Harpalinae
- Tribe: Chlaeniini
- Genus: Chlaenius; Bonelli, 1810

Synonyms
- Vachinius; Chlaeniellus Reitter, 1908

= Chlaenius =

Genus of beetles

Chlaenius is a large and diverse genus of ground beetle. It is native to the Palearctic realm (including Europe, the Near East, and North Africa), Afrotropical realm, and Nearctic realm. Worldwide, roughly 1,000 species are currently recognized with most known species occurring in the Oriental and Afrotropical regions. The genus is divided into many subgenera.

== Parasites ==
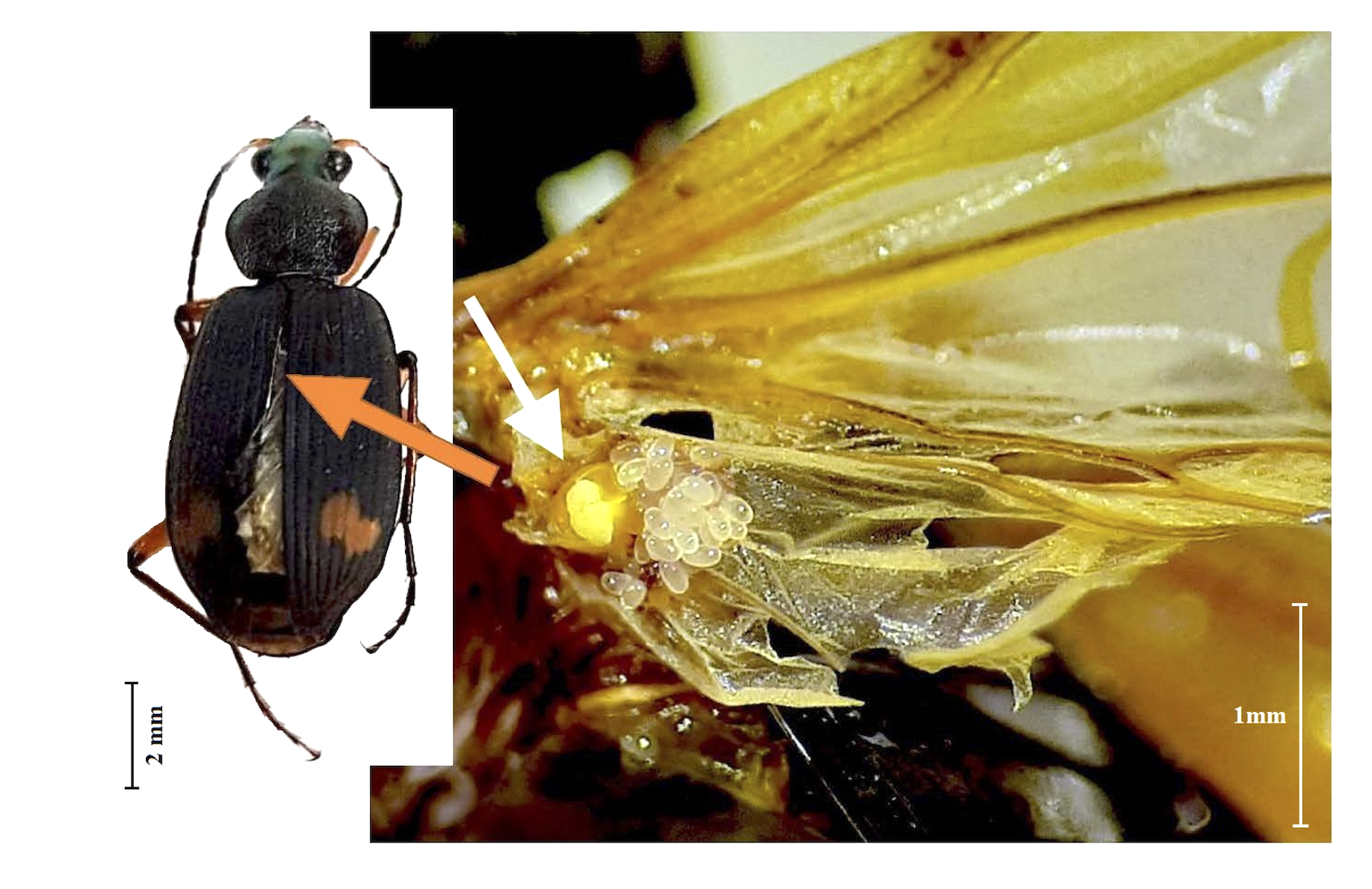
The mite Eutarsopolipus paryavae (Acari, Heterostigmatina, Podapolipidae) under the elytra of its host beetle Chlaenius flaviguttatus

In Australia, Chlaenius flaviguttatus Macleay is parasitized by a species of mite, Eutarsopolipus chlaenii Katlav & Hajiqanbar, 2021 which dwells under the elytra.

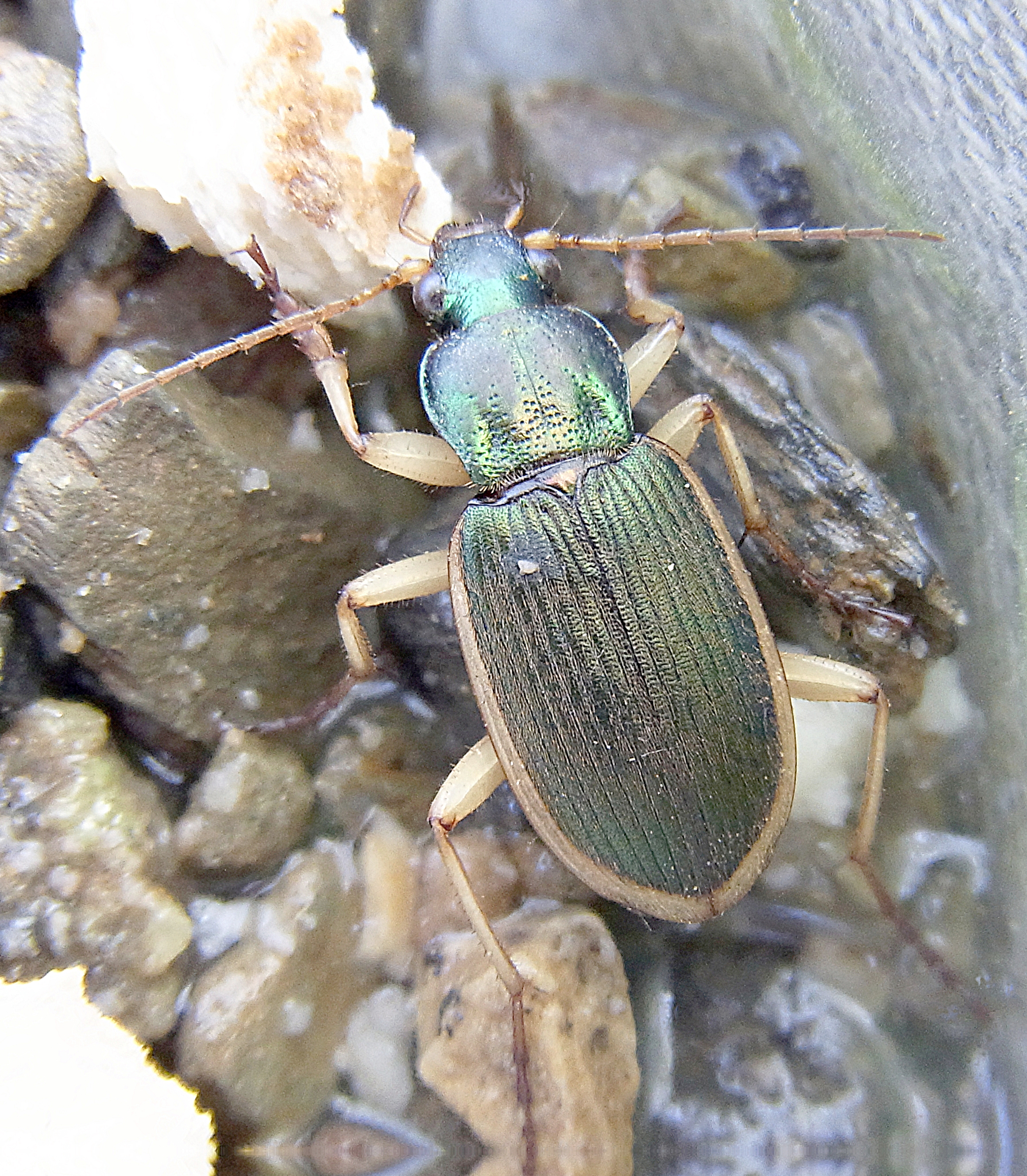
Chlaenius velutinus

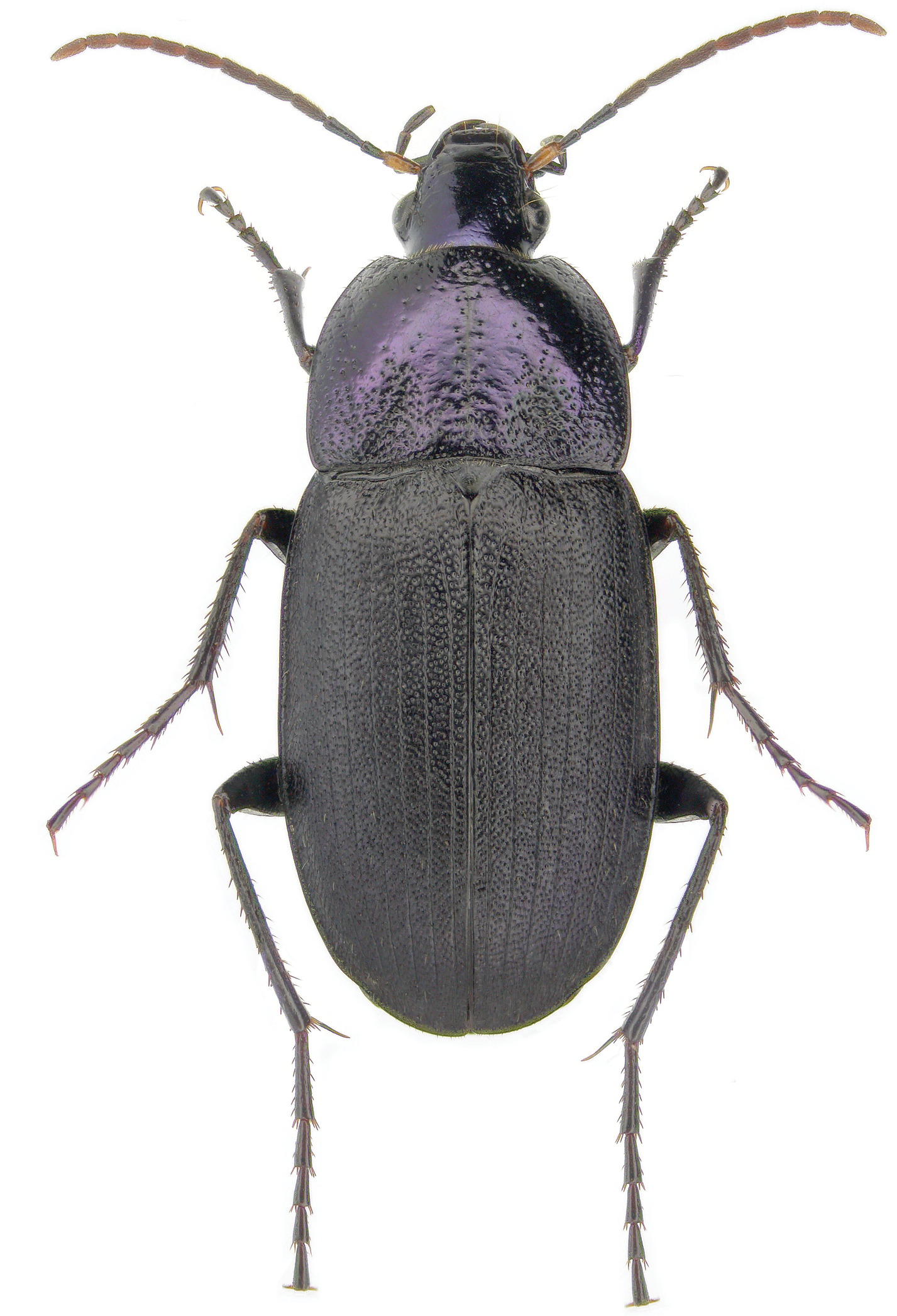
Chlaenius purpuricollis

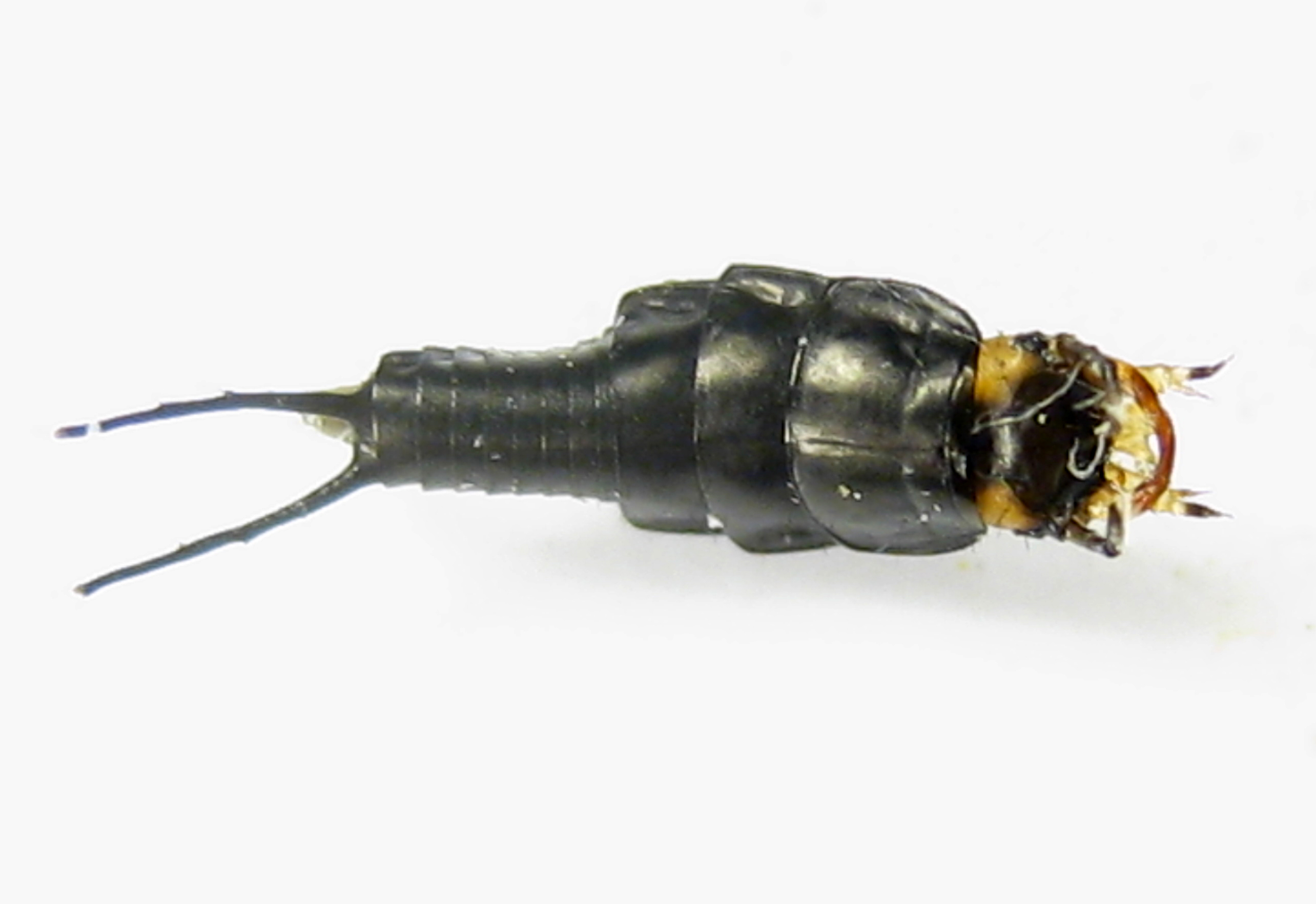
Chlaenius sp., larva
