= Badister transversus =

Scientific classification
- Kingdom: Animalia
- Phylum: Arthropoda
- Class: Insecta
- Order: Coleoptera
- Suborder: Adephaga
- Family: Carabidae
- Subfamily: Licininae
- Tribe: Licinini
- Genus: Badister
- Species: B. transversus

Binomial name
- Badister transversus Casey, 1920

Species of beetle

Badister transversus is a species of ground beetle in the family Carabidae. It is found in North America.
