= Dilonchus =

Scientific classification
- Domain: Eukaryota
- Kingdom: Animalia
- Phylum: Arthropoda
- Class: Insecta
- Order: Coleoptera
- Suborder: Adephaga
- Family: Carabidae
- Subfamily: Licininae
- Tribe: Licinini
- Subtribe: Lestignathina
- Genus: Dilonchus; Andrewes, 1936
- Species: D. pictus

Binomial name
- Dilonchus pictus Darlington, 1963

Genus of beetles

Dilonchus pictus is a species of beetles in the family Carabidae, the only species in the genus Dilonchus.
