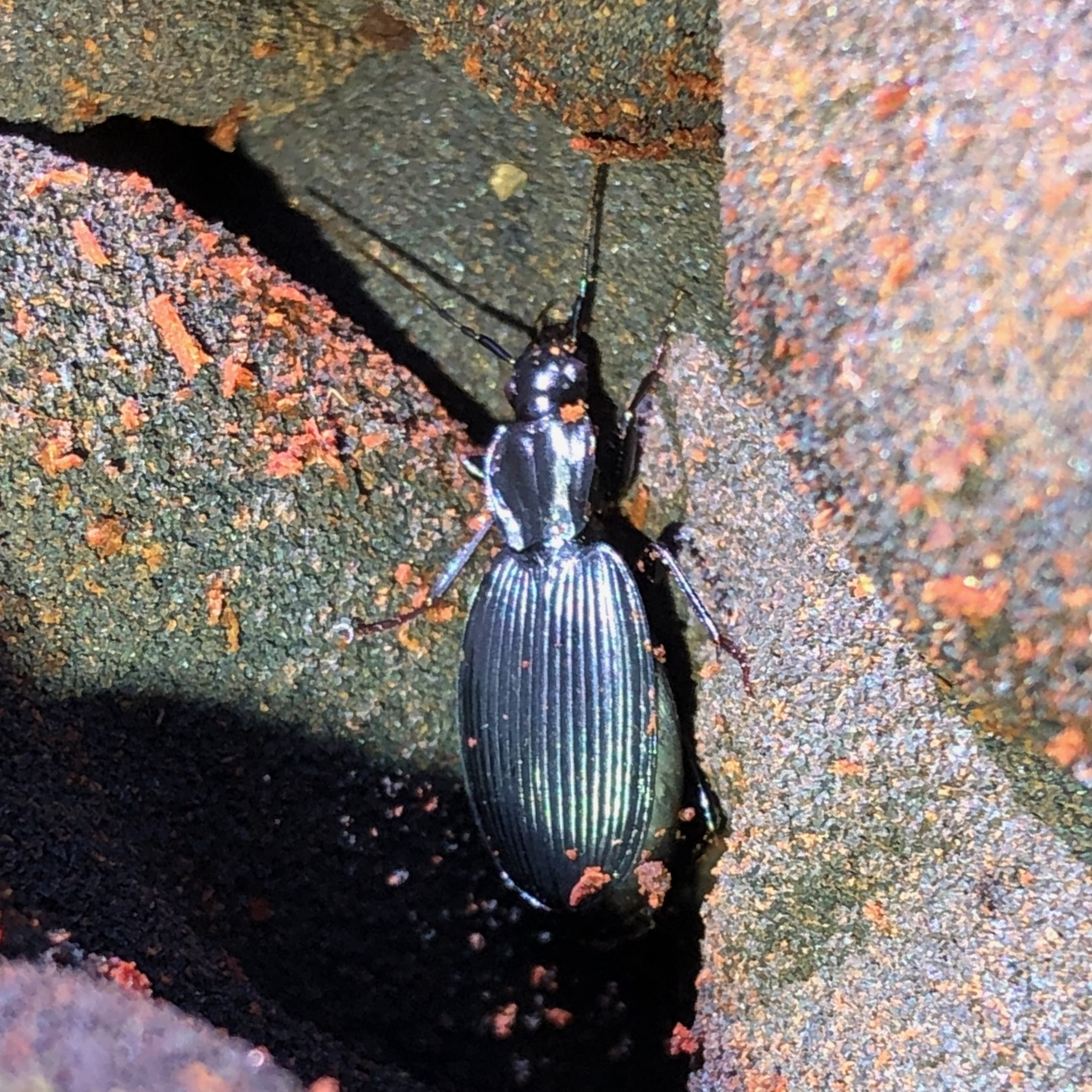
- In Australia

Scientific classification
- Domain: Eukaryota
- Kingdom: Animalia
- Phylum: Arthropoda
- Class: Insecta
- Order: Coleoptera
- Suborder: Adephaga
- Family: Carabidae
- Subfamily: Licininae
- Tribe: Licinini
- Subtribe: Lestignathina
- Genus: Siagonyx; W.J.MacLeay, 1871

= Siagonyx =

Genus of beetles

Siagonyx is a genus in the ground beetle family Carabidae. There are at least three described species in the genus Siagonyx, found in Australia.

== Species ==
These three species belong to the genus Siagonyx:

- Siagonyx amplipennis W.J.MacLeay, 1871
- Siagonyx blackburni Sloane, 1916
- Siagonyx mastersii W.J.MacLeay, 1871
