= Derostichus =

Scientific classification
- Kingdom: Animalia
- Phylum: Arthropoda
- Class: Insecta
- Order: Coleoptera
- Suborder: Adephaga
- Family: Carabidae
- Subfamily: Licininae
- Tribe: Licinini
- Subtribe: Licinina
- Genus: Derostichus; Motschulsky, 1860

Genus of beetles

Derostichus is a genus in the ground beetle family Carabidae. There are at least two described species in Derostichus.

== Species ==
These two species belong to the genus Derostichus:

- Derostichus caucasicus Motschulsky, 1860 (Georgia and Azerbaijan)
- Derostichus meurguesae Ledoux, 1972 (Turkey)
