= Badister ajax =

Scientific classification
- Domain: Eukaryota
- Kingdom: Animalia
- Phylum: Arthropoda
- Class: Insecta
- Order: Coleoptera
- Suborder: Adephaga
- Family: Carabidae
- Genus: Badister
- Species: B. ajax

Binomial name
- Badister ajax Britton, 1948

Species of beetle

Badister ajax is a species of ground beetle that is in the genus Badister. Badister ajax was discovered by the scientist Britton in 1948 and is endemic to Yemen.
