= Lestignathus =

Scientific classification
- Kingdom: Animalia
- Phylum: Arthropoda
- Class: Insecta
- Order: Coleoptera
- Suborder: Adephaga
- Family: Carabidae
- Subfamily: Licininae
- Tribe: Licinini
- Subtribe: Lestignathina
- Genus: Lestignathus; Erichson, 1842

Synonyms
- Lestognathus Agassiz, 1846

Genus of beetles

Lestignathus is a genus in the ground beetle family Carabidae. There are at least four described species in Lestignathus, found in Australia.

== Species ==
These four species belong to the genus Lestignathus:

- Lestignathus cursor Erichson, 1842
- Lestignathus foveatus Sloane, 1920
- Lestignathus pieperi Baehr, 2000
- Lestignathus simsoni Bates, 1878
