= Badister grandiceps =

Scientific classification
- Kingdom: Animalia
- Phylum: Arthropoda
- Class: Insecta
- Order: Coleoptera
- Suborder: Adephaga
- Family: Carabidae
- Genus: Badister
- Species: B. grandiceps

Binomial name
- Badister grandiceps Casey, 1920

Species of beetle

Badister grandiceps is a species of ground beetle in the genus Badister. It can be found in Canada and the United States and it is brown on colour.
