= Lacordairia =

Scientific classification
- Domain: Eukaryota
- Kingdom: Animalia
- Phylum: Arthropoda
- Class: Insecta
- Order: Coleoptera
- Suborder: Adephaga
- Family: Carabidae
- Subfamily: Licininae
- Tribe: Licinini
- Subtribe: Lestignathina
- Genus: Lacordairia; Laporte, 1867

Genus of beetles

Lacordairia is a genus in the beetle family Carabidae. There are about 12 described species in Lacordairia, found in Australia.

== Species ==
These 12 species belong to the genus Lacordairia:

- Lacordairia anchomenoides Laporte, 1867
- Lacordairia angustata Laporte, 1867
- Lacordairia argutoroides Laporte, 1867
- Lacordairia calathoides Laporte, 1867
- Lacordairia cychroides Laporte, 1867
- Lacordairia elongata B.Moore, 1992
- Lacordairia erichsoni Laporte, 1867
- Lacordairia fugax (Olliff, 1889)
- Lacordairia insulicola B.Moore, 1985
- Lacordairia proxima Laporte, 1867
- Lacordairia taylori B.Moore, 1992
- Lacordairia terrena Olliff, 1885
