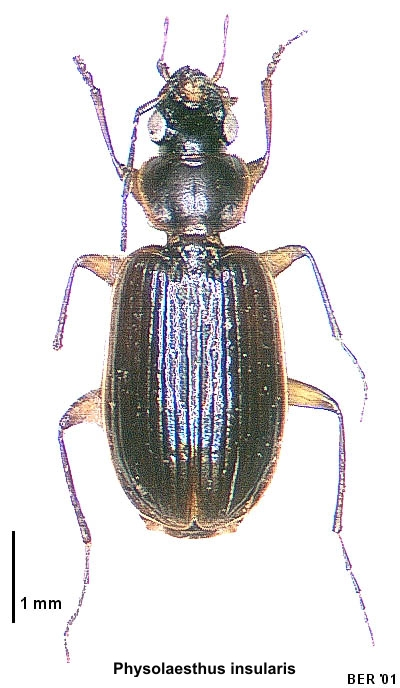

Scientific classification
- Domain: Eukaryota
- Kingdom: Animalia
- Phylum: Arthropoda
- Class: Insecta
- Order: Coleoptera
- Suborder: Adephaga
- Family: Carabidae
- Genus: Physolaesthus
- Species: P. insularis

Binomial name
- Physolaesthus insularis Bates, 1878

Synonyms
- Dichrochile limbatus Broun, 1880; Physolaesthus limbatus Hutton, 1904

= Physolaesthus insularis =

Species of beetle

Physolaesthus insularis is a species of beetle of the family Carabidae. It is found in Australia and New Zealand and inhabits wet places such as swamps, marshes and seashore drift at low altitudes. This beetle is most commonly observed from November until April. Adults are good flyers and are attracted to light.

== Taxonomy ==
It was first described by Henry Walter Bates in 1878 using a specimen collected by Charles Marcus Wakefield in the Canterbury region. The male holotype is held at the Natural History Museum, London.

== Description ==
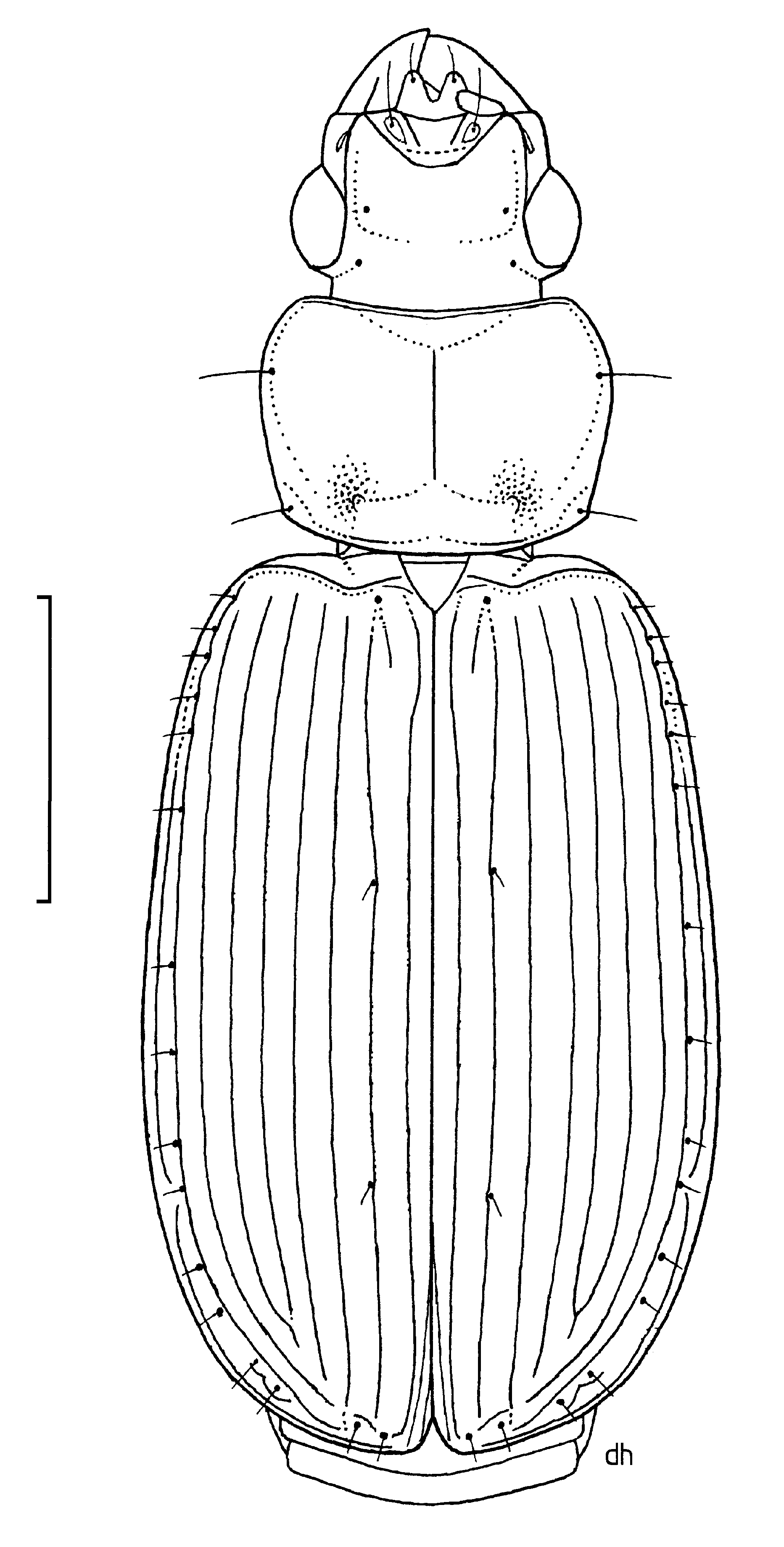
Illustration of P. insularis.

Bates described this species as follows:

Considerably smaller than either of the Australian species already described of this genus ; but agreeing in almost every other respect with Ph. australis (Chaudoir). It bears a strong resemblance to the European Badister peltatus, from which its swollen labial palpi at once distinguish it. It is smaller, and has a shorter thorax, the hind angles having a broad smooth fovea, from which springs a strong bristle. The pale margin of the elytra is confined to the reflexed rim.

This beetle is coloured a dark brown and is between 4.3 and 5.1 mm in length.

== Distribution ==
In New Zealand this species can be found throughout the North Island and the South Island as far south as Mid Canterbury. In Australia this beetle is found in South-eastern Australia.

== Habitat ==
The preferred habitat of this beetle are wet localities such as swamps, marshes and in seashore drift, at low altitudes.

== Behaviour ==
Adults are good flyers and can be attracted to light. This beetle is commonly observed from November until April.
