= Badister flavipes =

Scientific classification
- Domain: Eukaryota
- Kingdom: Animalia
- Phylum: Arthropoda
- Class: Insecta
- Order: Coleoptera
- Suborder: Adephaga
- Family: Carabidae
- Genus: Badister
- Species: B. flavipes

Binomial name
- Badister flavipes LeConte, 1853

Species of beetle

Badister flavipes is a species of ground beetle in the family Carabidae. It is found in the Caribbean Sea, Central America, North America, and South America.

== Subspecies ==
These two subspecies belong to the species Badister flavipes:

- Badister flavipes flavipes LeConte, 1853
- Badister flavipes mexicanus Van Dyke, 1945
