= Dicaelus furvus =

Scientific classification
- Kingdom: Animalia
- Phylum: Arthropoda
- Class: Insecta
- Order: Coleoptera
- Suborder: Adephaga
- Family: Carabidae
- Genus: Dicaelus
- Species: D. furvus

Binomial name
- Dicaelus furvus Dejean, 1826

Species of beetle

Dicaelus furvus is a species of ground beetle in the family Carabidae. It is found in North America.

== Subspecies ==
These two subspecies belong to the species Dicaelus furvus:

- Dicaelus furvus carinatus Dejean, 1831
- Dicaelus furvus furvus Dejean, 1826
