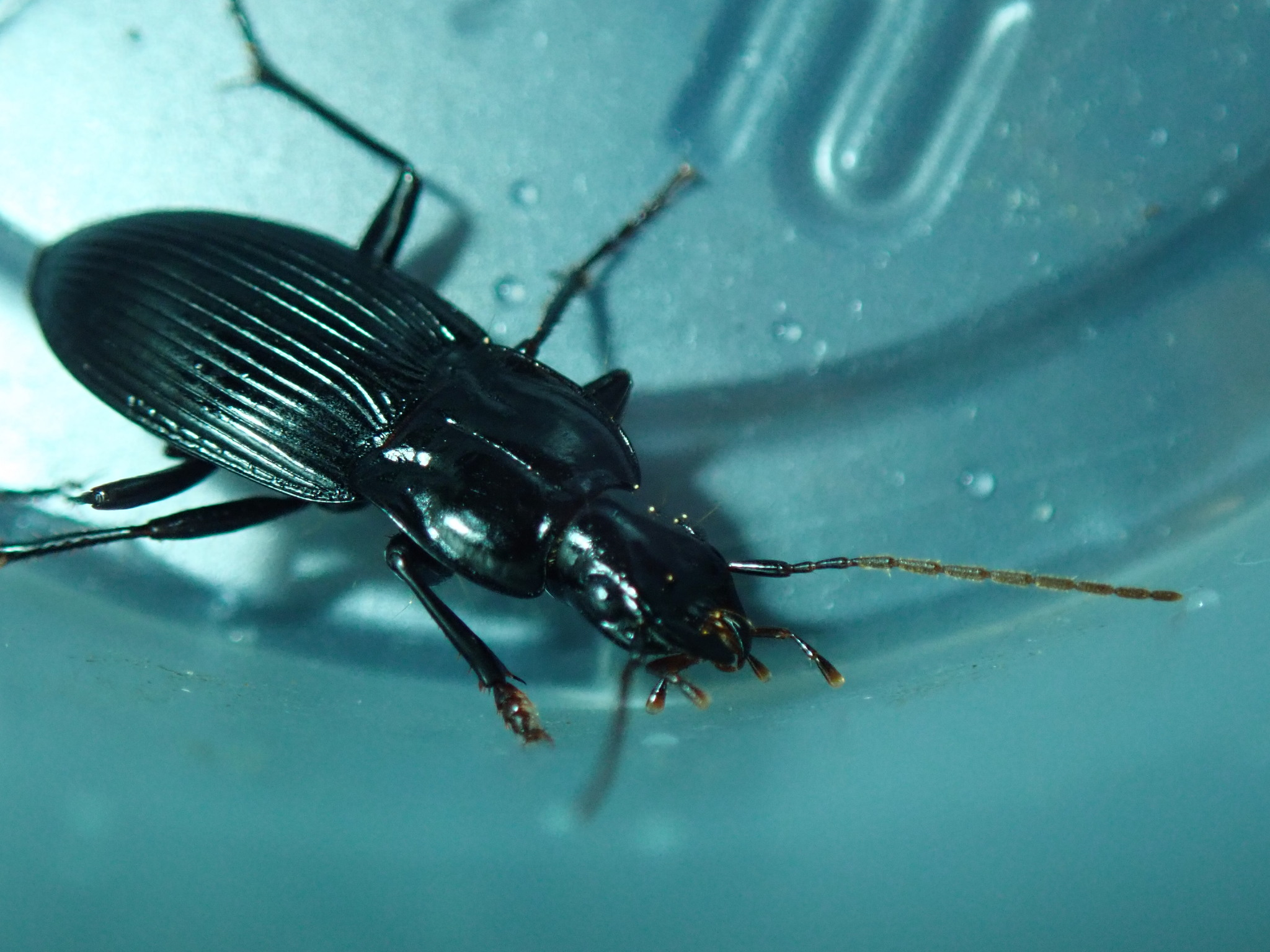

Scientific classification
- Kingdom: Animalia
- Phylum: Arthropoda
- Class: Insecta
- Order: Coleoptera
- Suborder: Adephaga
- Family: Carabidae
- Genus: Dicaelus
- Species: D. politus

Binomial name
- Dicaelus politus Dejean, 1826

= Dicaelus politus =

Species of beetle

Dicaelus politus is a species of ground beetle in the family Carabidae. It is found in North America.
