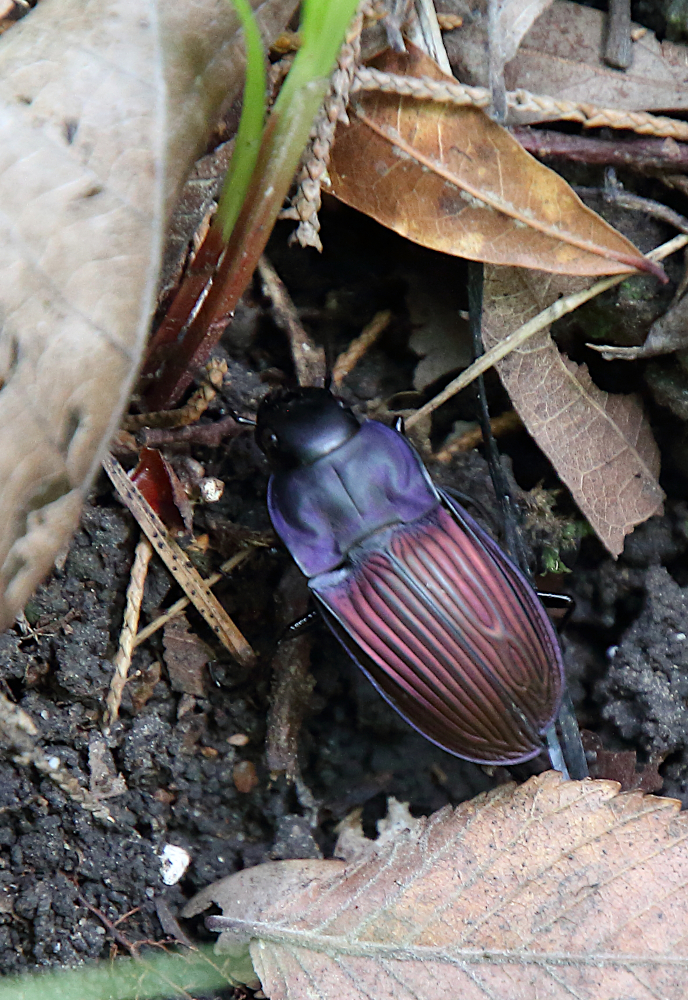
- Dicaelus purpuratus, Texas

Scientific classification
- Domain: Eukaryota
- Kingdom: Animalia
- Phylum: Arthropoda
- Class: Insecta
- Order: Coleoptera
- Suborder: Adephaga
- Family: Carabidae
- Subfamily: Licininae
- Tribe: Licinini
- Subtribe: Dicaelina
- Genus: Dicaelus; Bonelli, 1813

Subgenera
- Dicaelus Bonelli, 1813; Liodicaelus Casey, 1913; Paradicaelus Ball, 1959

= Dicaelus =

Genus of beetles

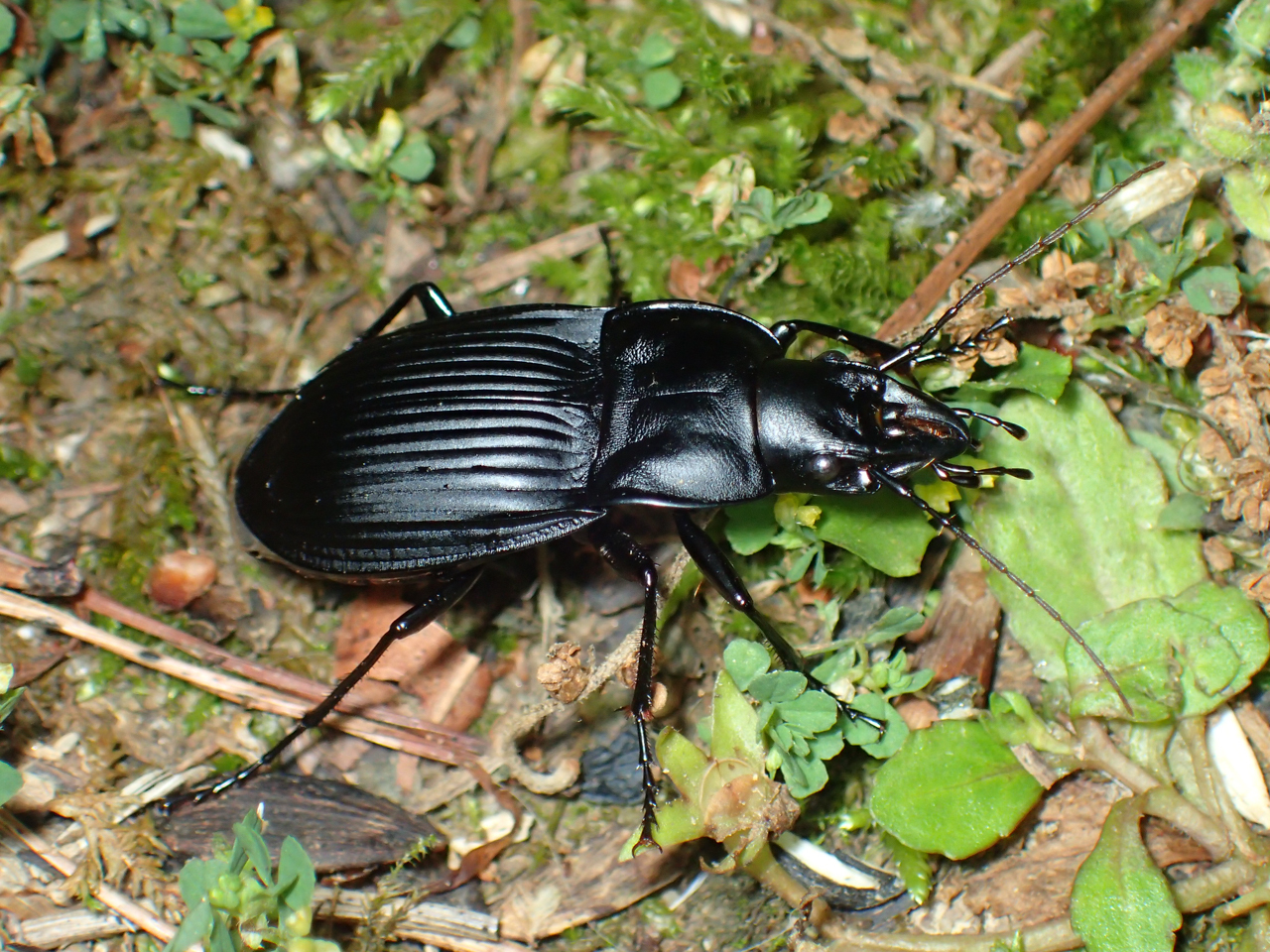
Dicaelus dilatatus, Alabama

Dicaelus is a genus in the beetle family Carabidae. There are about 18 described species in Dicaelus, found in North America.

== Species ==
These 18 species belong to the genus Dicaelus:

- Dicaelus alternans Dejean, 1826 (United States)
- Dicaelus ambiguus LaFerté-Sénectère, 1841 (United States)
- Dicaelus chermocki Ball, 1959 (United States)
- Dicaelus costatus LeConte, 1853 (United States and Mexico)
- Dicaelus crenatus LeConte, 1853 (United States)
- Dicaelus dilatatus Say, 1823 (United States and Canada)
- Dicaelus elongatus Bonelli, 1813 (United States and Canada)
- Dicaelus franclemonti Ball, 1991 (Mexico)
- Dicaelus furvus Dejean, 1826 (United States)
- Dicaelus laevipennis LeConte, 1847 (United States, Canada, and Mexico)
- Dicaelus politus Dejean, 1826 (United States and Canada)
- Dicaelus purpuratus Bonelli, 1813 (United States and Canada)
- Dicaelus quadratus LeConte, 1847 (United States)
- Dicaelus sculptilis Say, 1823 (United States and Canada)
- Dicaelus subtropicus Casey, 1913 (United States)
- Dicaelus suffusus (Casey, 1913) (United States)
- Dicaelus teter Bonelli, 1813 (United States and Canada)
- † Dicaelus alutaceus G.Horn, 1876
