= Atrotus =

Scientific classification
- Kingdom: Animalia
- Phylum: Arthropoda
- Class: Insecta
- Order: Coleoptera
- Suborder: Adephaga
- Family: Carabidae
- Subfamily: Licininae
- Tribe: Licinini
- Subtribe: Lestignathina
- Genus: Atrotus; Péringuey, 1896

Genus of beetles

Atrotus is a genus of ground beetles in the family Carabidae. It is placed in the licinine tribe Licinini and subtribe Lestignathina and occurs mainly in eastern and central Africa, with some species recorded from the Arabian Peninsula and the Indian subcontinent. There are about 18 described species in Atrotus.

The genus Zargochilus Alluaud, 1908 is treated in recent catalogues and nomenclatural databases as a junior synonym of Atrotus.

== Species ==
These 18 species belong to the genus Atrotus:

- Atrotus aethiopicus Basilewsky, 1951 (Ethiopia)
- Atrotus bedeli (Alluaud, 1908) (Tanzania)
- Atrotus bicolor Britton, 1948 (Yemen)
- Atrotus chenzemae Basilewsky, 1976 (Tanzania)
- Atrotus dallastai Basilewsky, 1977 (Kenya)
- Atrotus elgonensis Basilewsky, 1954 (Uganda and Kenya)
- Atrotus forcipatus Péringuey, 1896 (South Africa)
- Atrotus indicus B. Gueorguiev, 2013 (India)
- Atrotus kivuensis (Burgeon, 1935) (Africa)
- Atrotus kundelunguensis Basilewsky, 1951 (Democratic Republic of the Congo)
- Atrotus lamottei Basilewsky, 1968 (Ivory Coast)
- Atrotus leleupi Basilewsky, 1951 (Democratic Republic of the Congo)
- Atrotus luror Péringuey, 1926 (South Africa)
- Atrotus mandibularis Basilewsky, 1956 (Rwanda and Burundi)
- Atrotus oldeanicus Basilewsky, 1962 (Tanzania)
- Atrotus scotti (Alluaud, 1937) (Ethiopia)
- Atrotus sjostedti (Alluaud, 1927) (Kenya and Tanzania)
- Atrotus uluguruanus Basilewsky, 1962 (Tanzania)
