= Badister iranicus =

Scientific classification
- Domain: Eukaryota
- Kingdom: Animalia
- Phylum: Arthropoda
- Class: Insecta
- Order: Coleoptera
- Suborder: Adephaga
- Family: Carabidae
- Genus: Badister
- Species: B. iranicus

Binomial name
- Badister iranicus Jedlicka, 1961

Species of beetle

Badister iranicus is a species of ground beetle in the genus Badister. It was discovered by Jedlicka in 1961 in Iran.
