= Dicaelus costatus =

Scientific classification
- Domain: Eukaryota
- Kingdom: Animalia
- Phylum: Arthropoda
- Class: Insecta
- Order: Coleoptera
- Suborder: Adephaga
- Family: Carabidae
- Genus: Dicaelus
- Species: D. costatus

Binomial name
- Dicaelus costatus LeConte, 1853

Species of beetle

Dicaelus costatus, the South Texas embossed carabid, is a species of ground beetle in the family Carabidae. It is found in North America.
