= Badister micans =

Scientific classification
- Kingdom: Animalia
- Phylum: Arthropoda
- Class: Insecta
- Order: Coleoptera
- Suborder: Adephaga
- Family: Carabidae
- Genus: Badister
- Species: B. micans

Binomial name
- Badister micans LeConte, 1844

Synonyms
- Badister ocularis Casey, 1920

Species of beetle

Badister micans is a species of ground beetle in the family Carabidae. It is found in North America.
