= Hormacrus =

Scientific classification
- Kingdom: Animalia
- Phylum: Arthropoda
- Class: Insecta
- Order: Coleoptera
- Suborder: Adephaga
- Family: Carabidae
- Subfamily: Licininae
- Tribe: Licinini
- Subtribe: Lestignathina
- Genus: Hormacrus; Sloane, 1898

Genus of beetles

Hormacrus is a genus in the ground beetle family Carabidae. There are at least two described species in Hormacrus, found in Australia.

== Species ==
These two species belong to the genus Hormacrus:

- Hormacrus latus Sloane, 1898
- Hormacrus minor (Blackburn, 1890)
