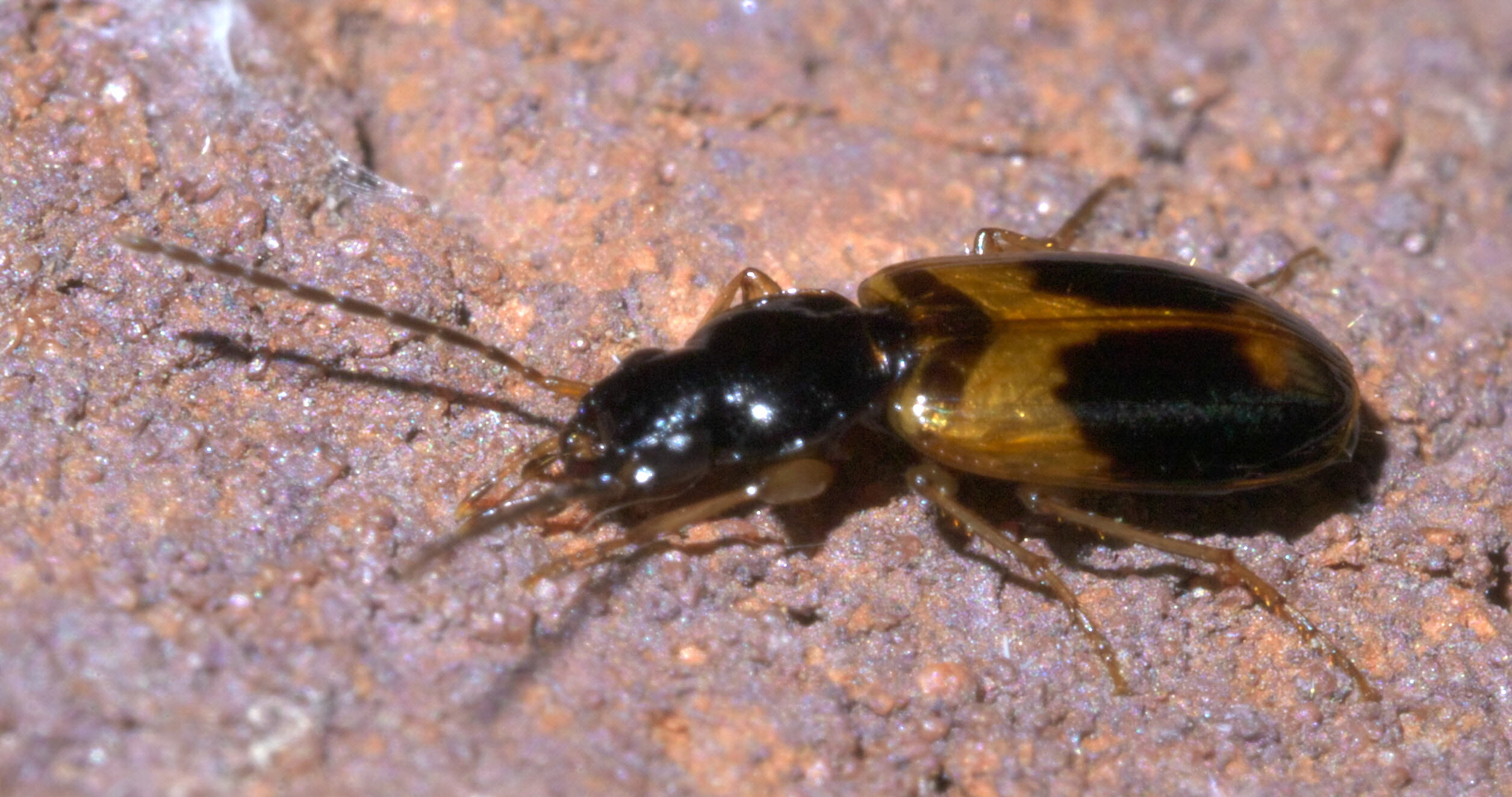
- Badister elegans, Oklahoma

Scientific classification
- Domain: Eukaryota
- Kingdom: Animalia
- Phylum: Arthropoda
- Class: Insecta
- Order: Coleoptera
- Suborder: Adephaga
- Family: Carabidae
- Subfamily: Licininae
- Tribe: Licinini
- Genus: Badister; Clairville, 1806

= Badister =

Genus of beetles

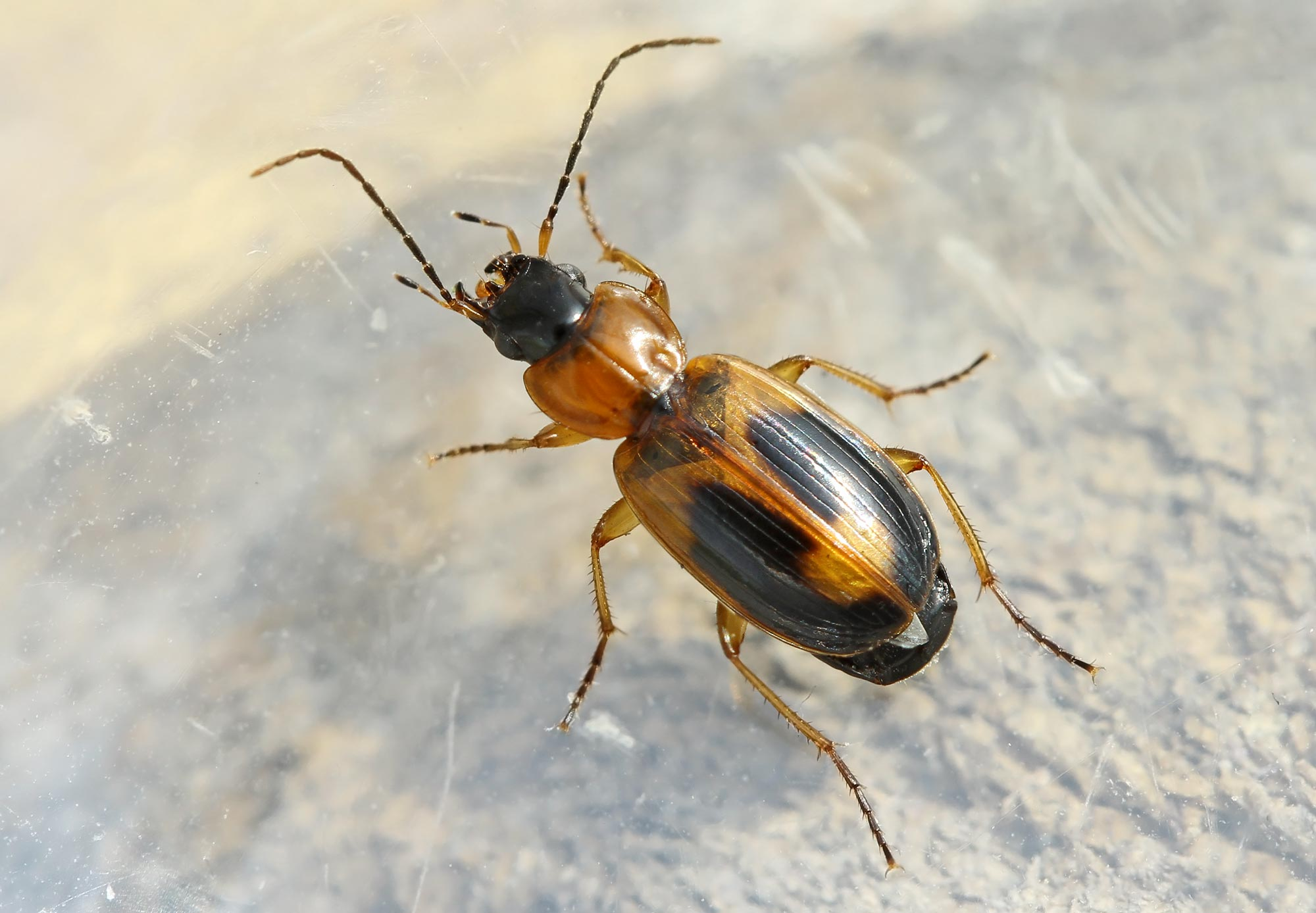
Badister unipustulatus

Badister is a genus of ground beetle in the family Carabidae native to North Africa, the Near East, and the Holarctic, including Europe.

In Ireland, Badister species are mostly confined to the south and west but no further north than midland counties, although the species number matches British and exceeds the Scandinavian totals.

== Species ==
These 54 species belong to the genus Badister:

- Badister ajax Britton, 1948
- Badister amazonus Erwin & Ball, 2011
- Badister anatolicus Schweiger, 1968
- Badister brevicollis Reiche, 1875
- Badister bucciarellii (Monguzzi, 1976)
- Badister bullatus (Schrank, 1798)
- Badister cavifrons Fauvel, 1903
- Badister collaris Motschulsky, 1844
- Badister denticulatus Wrase, 1995
- Badister dilatatus Chaudoir, 1837
- Badister dorsiger (Duftschmid, 1812)
- Badister elegans LeConte, 1880
- Badister fenestratus Semenov, 1906
- Badister ferrugineus Dejean, 1831
- Badister flavipes LeConte, 1853
- Badister fukiensis Jedlicka, 1956
- Badister grandiceps Casey, 1920
- Badister iranicus Jedlicka, 1961
- Badister iridescens LaFerté-Sénectère, 1851
- Badister ishigakiensis Habu, 1975
- Badister lacertosus Sturm, 1815
- Badister maculatus LeConte, 1853
- Badister mareei Burgeon, 1942
- Badister marginellus Bates, 1873
- Badister meridionalis Puel, 1925
- Badister micans LeConte, 1844
- Badister naviauxi Wrase, 1995
- Badister neopulchellus Lindroth, 1954
- Badister nigriceps A.Morawitz, 1863
- Badister notatus Haldeman, 1843
- Badister obtusus LeConte, 1878
- Badister parviceps Ball, 1959
- Badister peltatus (Panzer, 1796)
- Badister pictus Bates, 1873
- Badister promontorii Péringuey, 1896
- Badister pulchellus LeConte, 1847
- Badister reflexus LeConte, 1880
- Badister sasajii Morita, 2001
- Badister seriepunctatus Peyron, 1858
- Badister sodalis (Duftschmid, 1812)
- Badister submarinus Motschulsky, 1859
- Badister sundaicus Andrewes, 1926
- Badister thoracicus Wiedemann, 1823
- Badister transversus Casey, 1920
- Badister unipustulatus Bonelli, 1813
- Badister ussuriensis Jedlicka, 1937
- Badister vandykei Ball, 1959
- Badister vittatus Bates, 1873
- † Badister antecursor Scudder, 1900
- † Badister debilis Heer, 1847
- † Badister fragilis Heer, 1862
- † Badister grandis Heer, 1862
- † Badister macrocephalus Heer, 1862
- † Badister prodromus Heer, 1847
