= Eutogeneius =

Scientific classification
- Domain: Eukaryota
- Kingdom: Animalia
- Phylum: Arthropoda
- Class: Insecta
- Order: Coleoptera
- Suborder: Adephaga
- Family: Carabidae
- Subfamily: Licininae
- Tribe: Licinini
- Subtribe: Licinina
- Genus: Eutogeneius; Solier, 1849
- Species: E. fuscus

Binomial name
- Eutogeneius fuscus Solier, 1849

Synonyms
- Entomogenius Gemminger & Harold, 1868; Eutomogenius Gemminger & Harold, 1868

Genus of beetles

Eutogeneius is a genus in the ground beetle family Carabidae. This genus has a single species, Eutogeneius fuscus. It is found in Chile.
