= Dicaelus sculptilis =

Scientific classification
- Domain: Eukaryota
- Kingdom: Animalia
- Phylum: Arthropoda
- Class: Insecta
- Order: Coleoptera
- Suborder: Adephaga
- Family: Carabidae
- Genus: Dicaelus
- Species: D. sculptilis

Binomial name
- Dicaelus sculptilis Say, 1823

Species of beetle

Dicaelus sculptilis is a species of ground beetle in the family Carabidae. It is found in North America.

== Subspecies ==
These three subspecies belong to the species Dicaelus sculptilis:

- Dicaelus sculptilis intricatus LeConte, 1873
- Dicaelus sculptilis sculptilis Say, 1823
- Dicaelus sculptilis upioides Ball, 1959
