= Eurygnathus =

Scientific classification
- Domain: Eukaryota
- Kingdom: Animalia
- Phylum: Arthropoda
- Class: Insecta
- Order: Coleoptera
- Suborder: Adephaga
- Family: Carabidae
- Subfamily: Licininae
- Tribe: Licinini
- Subtribe: Licinina
- Genus: Eurygnathus; Wollaston, 1854
- Species: E. latreillei

Binomial name
- Eurygnathus latreillei (Laporte, 1834)

Synonyms
- Eurygnathella E.Strand, 1936

Genus of beetles

Eurygnathus is a genus in the ground beetle family Carabidae. This genus has a single species, Eurygnathus latreillei, found in Madeira.
