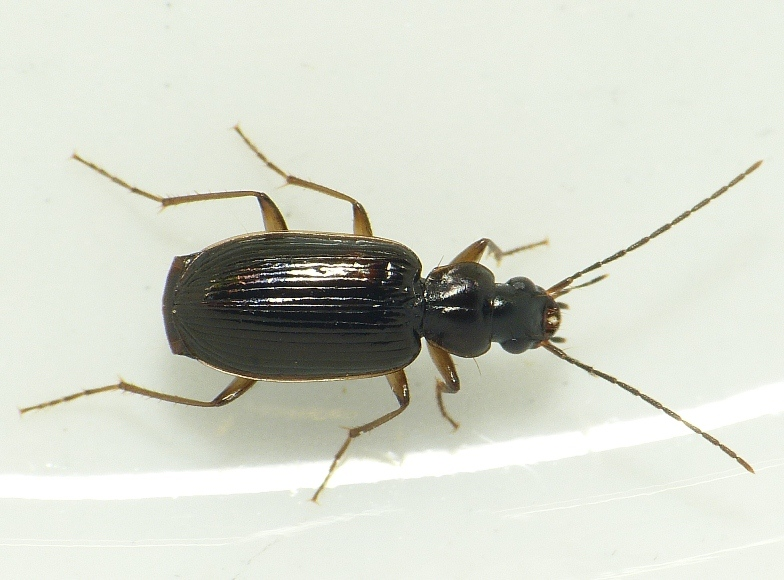

Scientific classification
- Domain: Eukaryota
- Kingdom: Animalia
- Phylum: Arthropoda
- Class: Insecta
- Order: Coleoptera
- Suborder: Adephaga
- Family: Carabidae
- Genus: Badister
- Species: B. collaris

Binomial name
- Badister collaris Motschulsky, 1844

= Badister collaris =

Species of beetle

Badister collaris is a species of ground beetle of the subfamily Licininae that can be found everywhere in Europe except for Estonia, Finland, Moldova, Romania, and various European islands.
