= Dicaelus dilatatus =

Scientific classification
- Domain: Eukaryota
- Kingdom: Animalia
- Phylum: Arthropoda
- Class: Insecta
- Order: Coleoptera
- Suborder: Adephaga
- Family: Carabidae
- Genus: Dicaelus
- Species: D. dilatatus

Binomial name
- Dicaelus dilatatus Say, 1823

Species of beetle

Dicaelus dilatatus is a species of ground beetle in the family Carabidae. It is found in North America.

== Subspecies ==
These two subspecies belong to the species Dicaelus dilatatus:

- Dicaelus dilatatus dilatatus Say, 1823
- Dicaelus dilatatus sinuatus Ball, 1959
