= Badister notatus =

Scientific classification
- Domain: Eukaryota
- Kingdom: Animalia
- Phylum: Arthropoda
- Class: Insecta
- Order: Coleoptera
- Suborder: Adephaga
- Family: Carabidae
- Genus: Badister
- Species: B. notatus

Binomial name
- Badister notatus Haldeman, 1843

Species of beetle

Badister notatus is a species of ground beetle in the family Carabidae. It is found in North America.
