= Badister elegans =

Scientific classification
- Kingdom: Animalia
- Phylum: Arthropoda
- Class: Insecta
- Order: Coleoptera
- Suborder: Adephaga
- Family: Carabidae
- Genus: Badister
- Species: B. elegans

Binomial name
- Badister elegans LeConte, 1880

Species of beetle

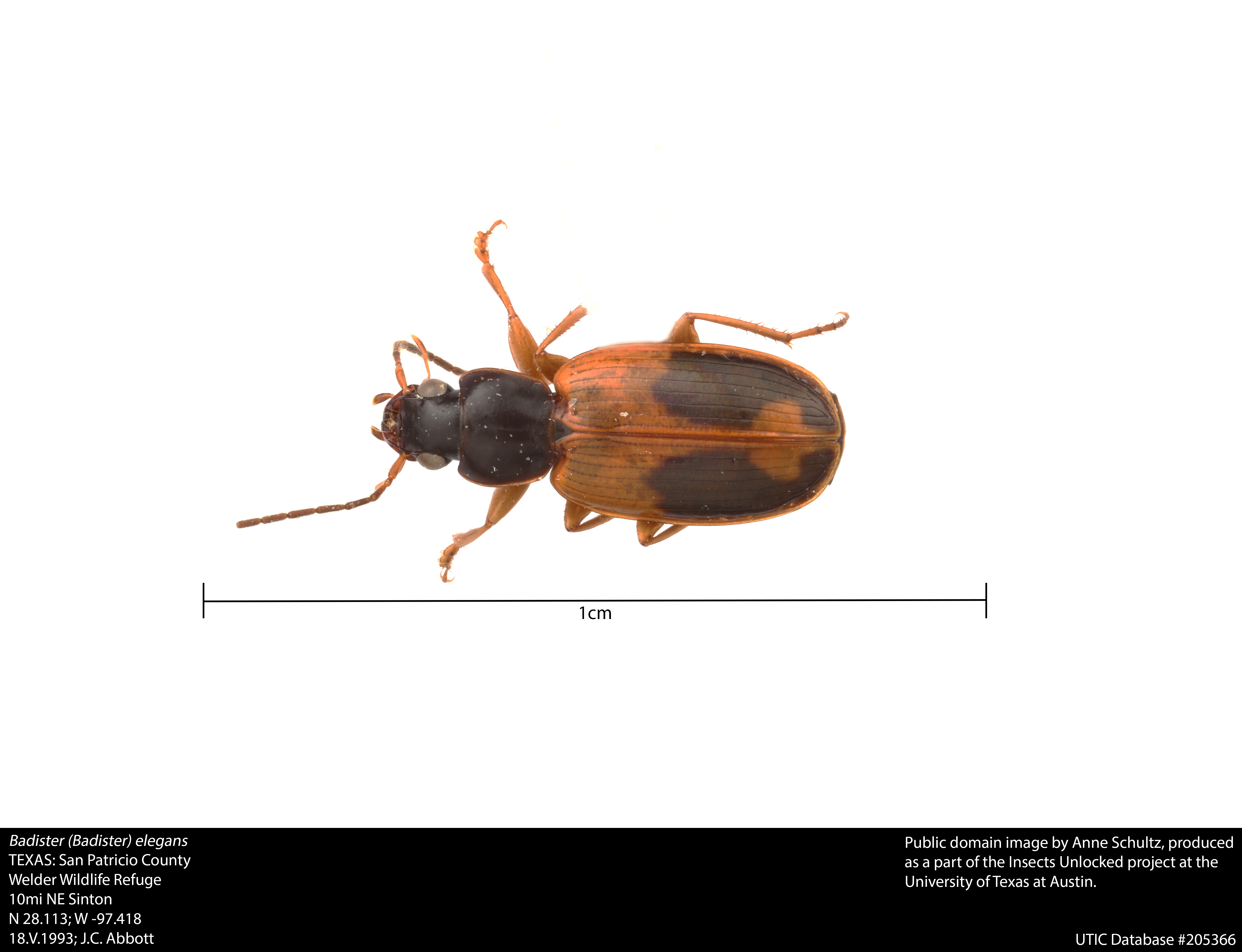
Badister (Badister) elegans

Badister elegans is a species of ground beetle in the family Carabidae. It is found in North America.
