= Badister reflexus =

Scientific classification
- Kingdom: Animalia
- Phylum: Arthropoda
- Clade: Pancrustacea
- Class: Insecta
- Order: Coleoptera
- Suborder: Adephaga
- Family: Carabidae
- Genus: Badister
- Species: B. reflexus

Binomial name
- Badister reflexus LeConte, 1880

Species of beetle

Badister reflexus is a species of ground beetle in the family Carabidae. It is found in North America. There are no subcategories listed in the Catalogue of Life.

It was first discovered and described by John Lawrence LeConte in 1880.
