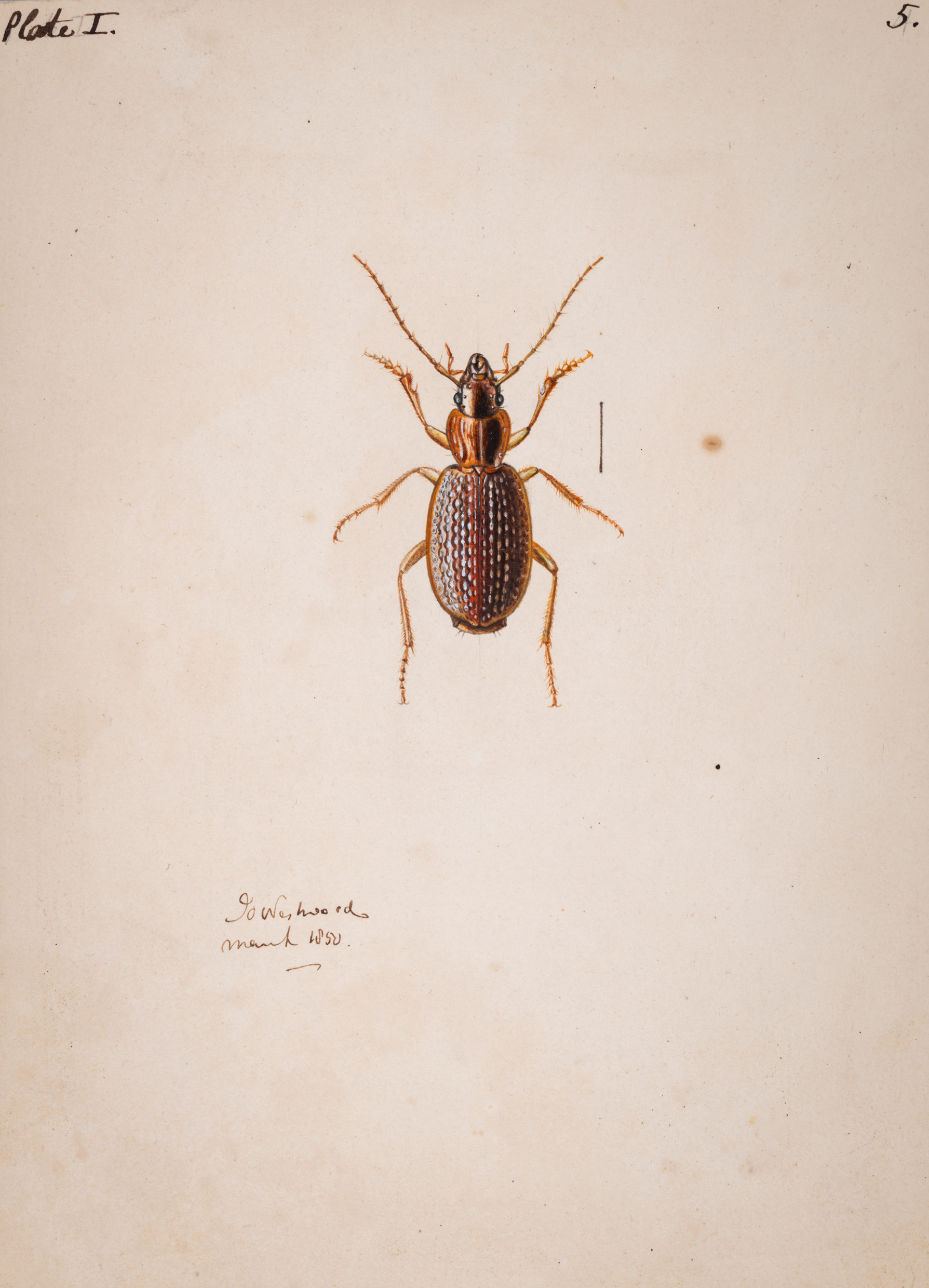
- An illustration of Z. schaumii by John O. Westwood from the Royal Albert Memorial Museum

Scientific classification
- Domain: Eukaryota
- Kingdom: Animalia
- Phylum: Arthropoda
- Class: Insecta
- Order: Coleoptera
- Suborder: Adephaga
- Family: Carabidae
- Subfamily: Licininae
- Tribe: Licinini
- Subtribe: Lestignathina
- Genus: Zargus; Wollaston, 1854

= Zargus =

Genus of beetles

Zargus is a genus of in the beetle family Carabidae. There are about six described species in Zargus.

== Species ==
These six species belong to the genus Zargus:

- Zargus crotchianus Wollaston, 1865 (Canary Islands)
- Zargus desertae Wollaston, 1854 (Madeira)
- Zargus monizii Wollaston, 1860 (Madeira)
- Zargus pellucidus Wollaston, 1854 (Madeira)
- Zargus putzeri Wrase, 2010 (Madeira)
- Zargus schaumii Wollaston, 1854 (Madeira)
