= Omestes =

Scientific classification
- Domain: Eukaryota
- Kingdom: Animalia
- Phylum: Arthropoda
- Class: Insecta
- Order: Coleoptera
- Suborder: Adephaga
- Family: Carabidae
- Tribe: Licinini
- Subtribe: Licinina
- Genus: Omestes; Andrewes, 1933
- Species: O. torta

Binomial name
- Omestes torta Andrewes, 1933

Genus of beetles

Omestes is a genus in the ground beetle family Carabidae. This genus has a single species, Omestes torta. It is found in Indonesia, Philippines, New Guinea, the Solomon Islands, and Australia.
