= Microferonia =

Scientific classification
- Domain: Eukaryota
- Kingdom: Animalia
- Phylum: Arthropoda
- Class: Insecta
- Order: Coleoptera
- Suborder: Adephaga
- Family: Carabidae
- Subfamily: Licininae
- Tribe: Licinini
- Subtribe: Lestignathina
- Genus: Microferonia; Blackburn, 1890

Synonyms
- Genycerus Andrewes, 1933; Gerrycerus Andrewes, 1933

Genus of beetles

Microferonia is a genus in the ground beetle family Carabidae. There are about 10 described species in Microferonia, found in Australia, New Guinea, and Indonesia.

== Species ==
These 10 species belong to the genus Microferonia:

- Microferonia adelaidae Blackburn, 1890 (Australia)
- Microferonia alticola Baehr, 1998 (Indonesia and New Guinea)
- Microferonia anchomenoides (W.J.MacLeay, 1871) (Australia)
- Microferonia avicapitis Baehr, 1998 (Indonesia and New Guinea)
- Microferonia baro Darlington, 1968 (New Guinea)
- Microferonia cinctipennis Sloane, 1898 (Australia)
- Microferonia habbemae Baehr, 1998 (Indonesia and New Guinea)
- Microferonia howei B.Moore, 1992 (Australia)
- Microferonia lucanoides (Andrewes, 1933) (Indonesia)
- Microferonia marginata (Laporte, 1867) (Australia)
