= Diplocheila oregona =

Scientific classification
- Domain: Eukaryota
- Kingdom: Animalia
- Phylum: Arthropoda
- Class: Insecta
- Order: Coleoptera
- Suborder: Adephaga
- Family: Carabidae
- Genus: Diplocheila
- Species: D. oregona

Binomial name
- Diplocheila oregona (Hatch, 1951)

Species of beetle

Diplocheila oregona is a species of ground beetle in the family Carabidae. It has is found in North America from Nevada and Utah up to British Columbia and Manitoba.
