= Dicaelus laevipennis =

Scientific classification
- Kingdom: Animalia
- Phylum: Arthropoda
- Class: Insecta
- Order: Coleoptera
- Suborder: Adephaga
- Family: Carabidae
- Genus: Dicaelus
- Species: D. laevipennis

Binomial name
- Dicaelus laevipennis LeConte, 1847

Species of beetle

Dicaelus laevipennis is a species of ground beetle in the family Carabidae. It is found in North America.

== Subspecies ==
These three subspecies belong to the species Dicaelus laevipennis:

- Dicaelus laevipennis abbreviatus Bates, 1891
- Dicaelus laevipennis flohri Bates, 1878
- Dicaelus laevipennis laevipennis LeConte, 1847
