= Dicaelus ambiguus =

Scientific classification
- Kingdom: Animalia
- Phylum: Arthropoda
- Class: Insecta
- Order: Coleoptera
- Suborder: Adephaga
- Family: Carabidae
- Genus: Dicaelus
- Species: D. ambiguus

Binomial name
- Dicaelus ambiguus LaFerté-Sénectère, 1841

Species of beetle

Dicaelus ambiguus is a species of ground beetle in the family Carabidae. It is found in North America.
