= Diplocheila impressicollis =

Scientific classification
- Kingdom: Animalia
- Phylum: Arthropoda
- Class: Insecta
- Order: Coleoptera
- Suborder: Adephaga
- Family: Carabidae
- Genus: Diplocheila
- Species: D. impressicollis

Binomial name
- Diplocheila impressicollis (Dejean, 1831)

Species of beetle

Diplocheila impressicollis is a species of ground beetle in the family Carabidae. It is found in North America.
