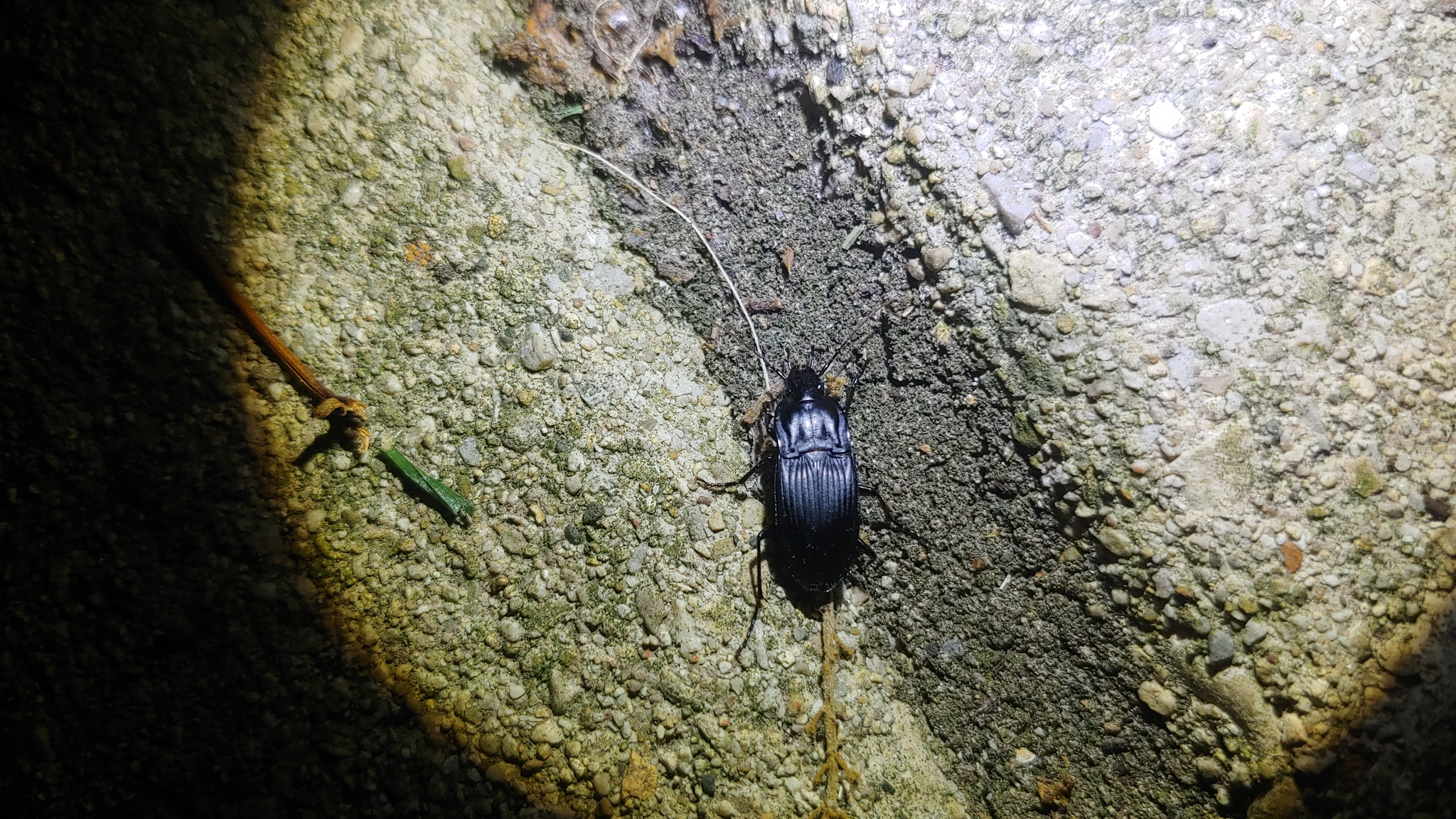

Scientific classification
- Kingdom: Animalia
- Phylum: Arthropoda
- Clade: Pancrustacea
- Class: Insecta
- Order: Coleoptera
- Suborder: Adephaga
- Family: Carabidae
- Genus: Dicaelus
- Species: D. elongatus

Binomial name
- Dicaelus elongatus Bonelli, 1813

= Dicaelus elongatus =

Species of beetle

Dicaelus elongatus is a species of ground beetle in the family Carabidae. It is found in North America.
