= Platylytron =

Scientific classification
- Domain: Eukaryota
- Kingdom: Animalia
- Phylum: Arthropoda
- Class: Insecta
- Order: Coleoptera
- Suborder: Adephaga
- Family: Carabidae
- Tribe: Licinini
- Subtribe: Lestignathina
- Genus: Platylytron; W.J.MacLeay, 1873
- Species: P. amplipenne

Binomial name
- Platylytron amplipenne W.J.MacLeay, 1873

Synonyms
- Platelytron Csiki, 1929

Species of beetle

Platylytron is a genus in the ground beetle family Carabidae. This genus has a single species, Platylytron amplipenne. It is found in Australia.
