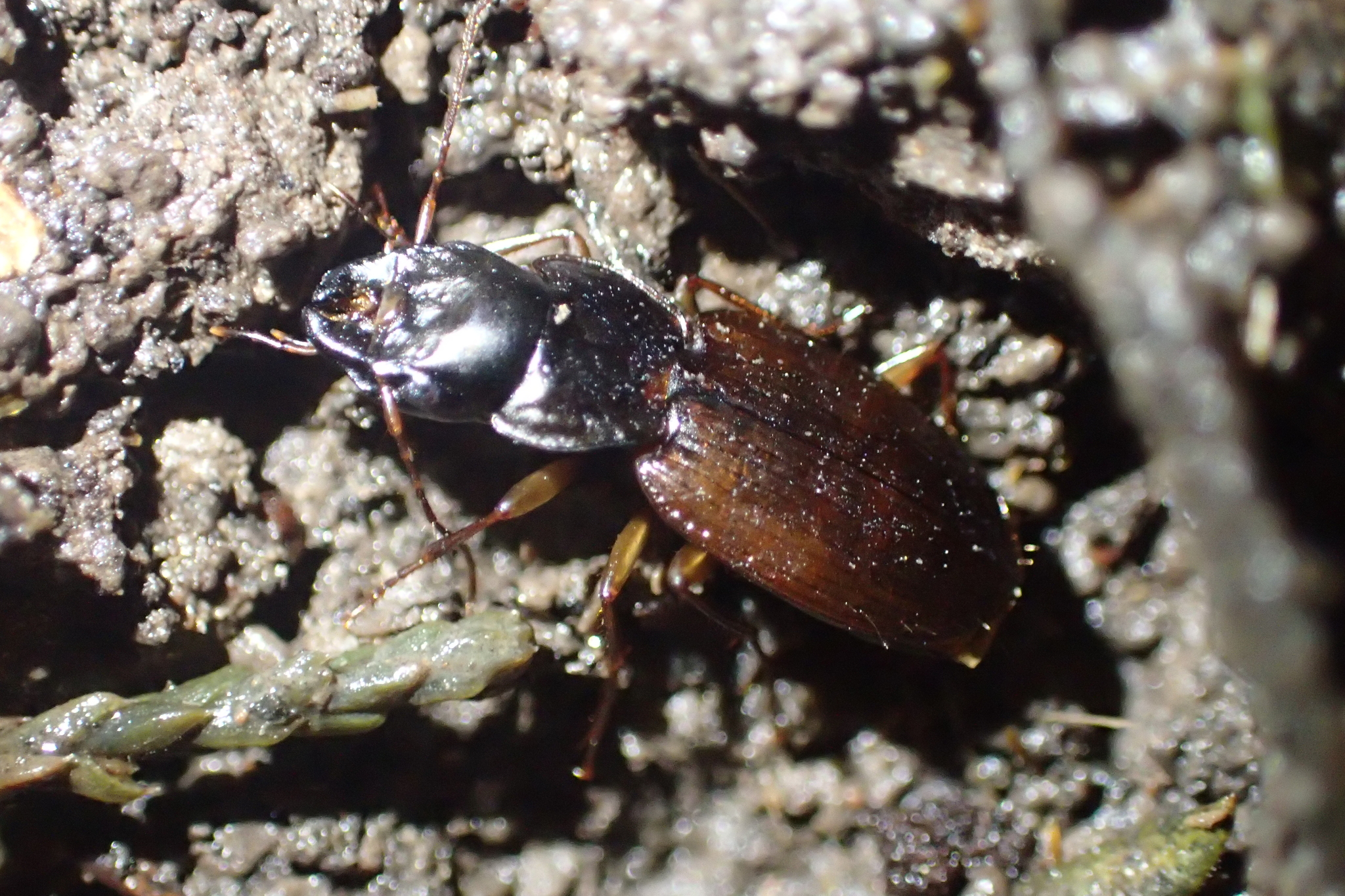
- Physolaesthus insularis, New Zealand

Scientific classification
- Domain: Eukaryota
- Kingdom: Animalia
- Phylum: Arthropoda
- Class: Insecta
- Order: Coleoptera
- Suborder: Adephaga
- Family: Carabidae
- Subfamily: Licininae
- Tribe: Licinini
- Subtribe: Licinina
- Genus: Physolaesthus; Chaudoir, 1850

Synonyms
- Physolesthus Blackburn, 1890; Physoloesthus Lacordaire, 1854

= Physolaesthus =

Genus of beetles

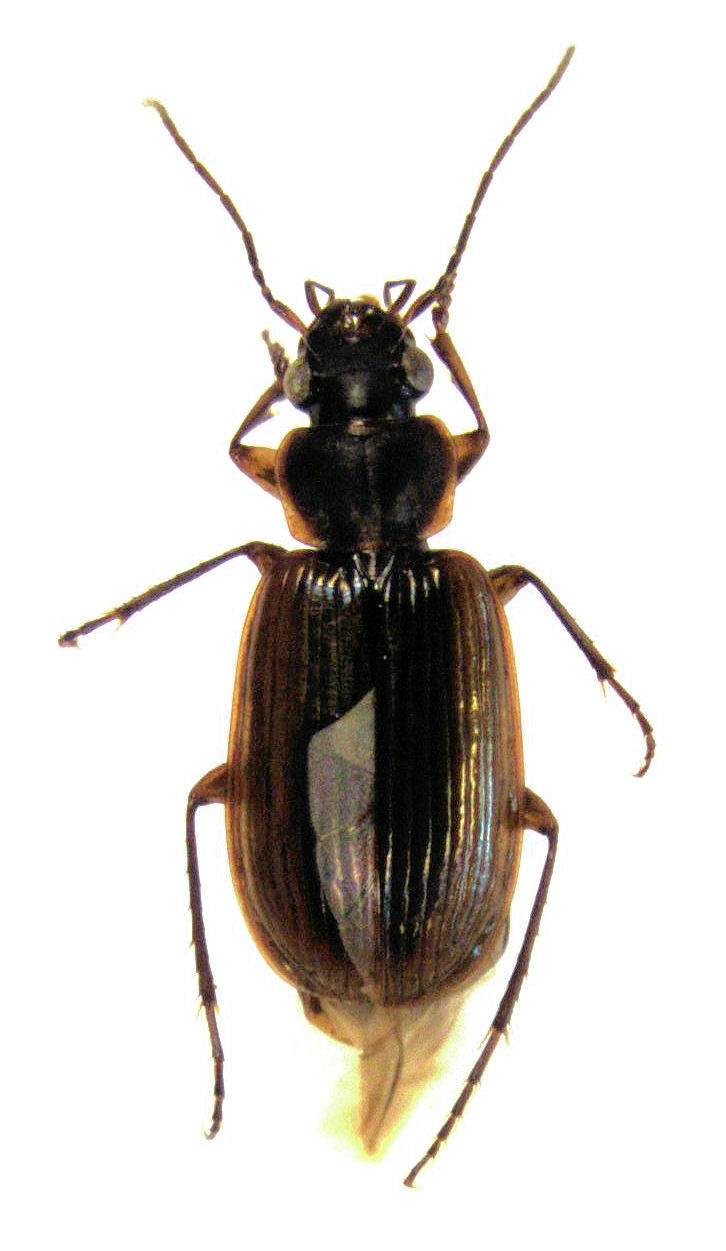
Physolaesthus sp., probably P. insularis (male, length about 5 mm)

Physolaesthus is a genus in the ground beetle family Carabidae. There are about nine described species in Physolaesthus.

== Species ==
These nine species belong to the genus Physolaesthus:

- Physolaesthus australis Chaudoir, 1850 (Australia)
- Physolaesthus caviceps (Andrewes, 1936) (Indonesia, Philippines, New Guinea, Australia)
- Physolaesthus grandipalpis W.J.MacLeay, 1871 (Australia)
- Physolaesthus insularis Bates, 1878 (Australia, New Zealand)
- Physolaesthus limbatus (Broun, 1880) (New Zealand)
- Physolaesthus minor (Louwerens, 1956) (Indonesia)
- Physolaesthus pallidus Blackburn, 1890 (Australia)
- Physolaesthus ruficollis Sloane, 1900 (Australia)
- Physolaesthus suturalis Laporte, 1867 (Australia)
