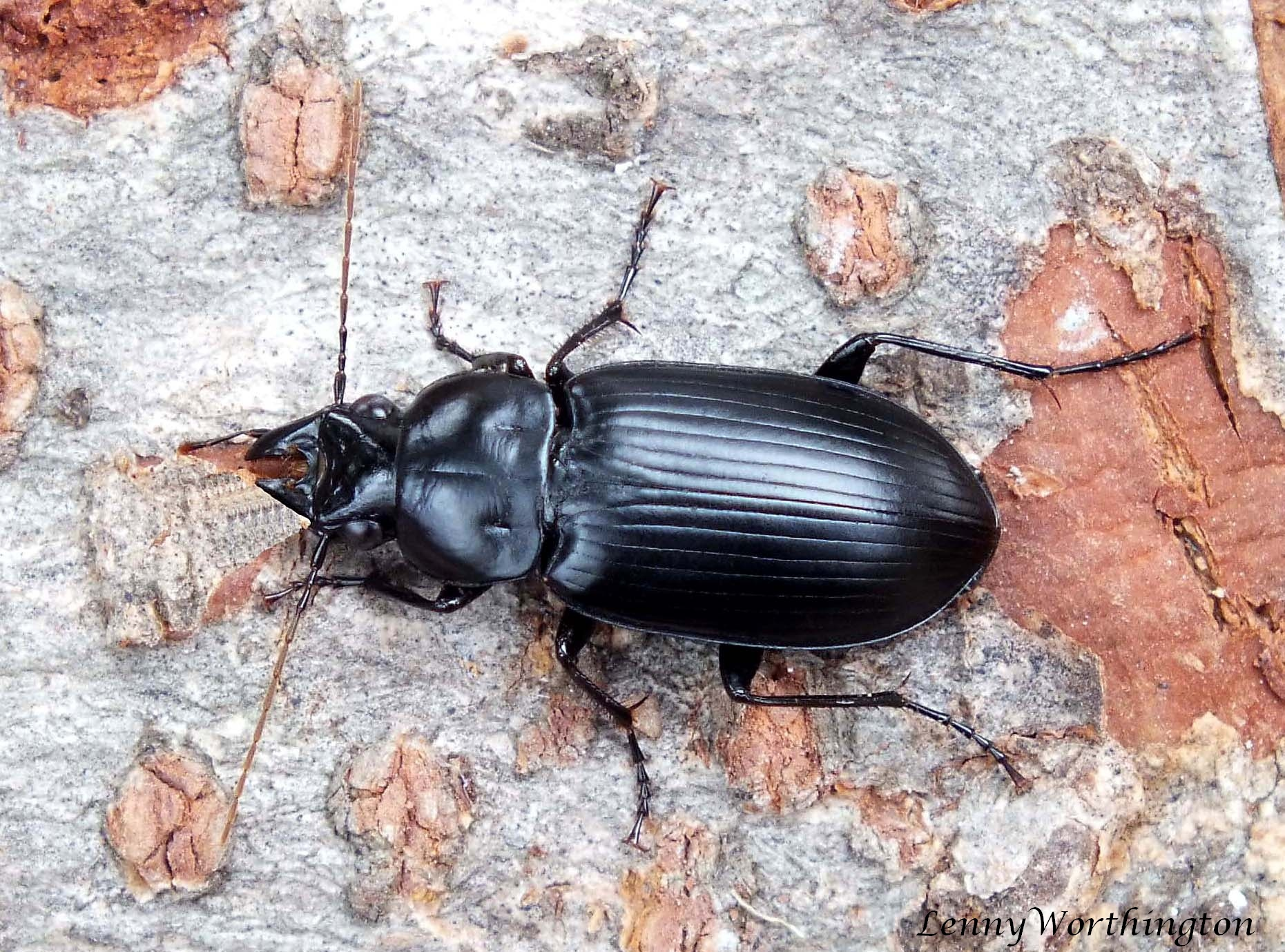
- Diplocheila, Thailand

Scientific classification
- Domain: Eukaryota
- Kingdom: Animalia
- Phylum: Arthropoda
- Class: Insecta
- Order: Coleoptera
- Suborder: Adephaga
- Family: Carabidae
- Subfamily: Licininae
- Tribe: Licinini
- Subtribe: Dicaelina
- Genus: Diplocheila; Brullé, 1835

Subgenera
- Diplocheila Brullé, 1835; Isorembus Jeannel, 1949; Neorembus Ball, 1959

= Diplocheila =

Genus of beetles

Diplocheila is a genus in the beetle family Carabidae. There are more than 30 described species in Diplocheila.

== Species ==
These 31 species belong to the genus Diplocheila:

- Diplocheila aegyptiaca (Dejean, 1831)
- Diplocheila assimilis (LeConte, 1844)
- Diplocheila capensis (LaFerté-Sénectère, 1851)
- Diplocheila colossus (Bates, 1892)
- Diplocheila cordicollis (LaFerté-Sénectère, 1851)
- Diplocheila crossi Will, 1998
- Diplocheila daldorfi (Crotch, 1871)
- Diplocheila distinguenda (LaFerté-Sénectère, 1851)
- Diplocheila elongata (Bates, 1873)
- Diplocheila erwini Allegro & Giachino, 2021
- Diplocheila exotica Andrewes, 1931
- Diplocheila impressicollis (Dejean, 1831)
- Diplocheila laevigata (Bates, 1892)
- Diplocheila laevigotoides Jedlicka, 1936
- Diplocheila laevis (Lesne, 1896)
- Diplocheila latifrons (Dejean, 1831)
- Diplocheila macromandibularis (Habu & Tanaka, 1956)
- Diplocheila major (LeConte, 1847)
- Diplocheila minima Jedlicka, 1931
- Diplocheila nupera Casey, 1897
- Diplocheila obtusa (LeConte, 1847)
- Diplocheila oregona (Hatch, 1951)
- Diplocheila perscissa Andrewes, 1921
- Diplocheila pinodes Andrewes, 1922
- Diplocheila polita (Fabricius, 1792)
- Diplocheila striatopunctata (LeConte, 1844)
- Diplocheila transcaspica (Semenov, 1891)
- Diplocheila undulata Carr, 1920
- Diplocheila walterrossii Allegro & Giachino, 2021
- Diplocheila zeelandica (L.Redtenbacher, 1868)
- † Diplocheila henshawi Scudder, 1890
