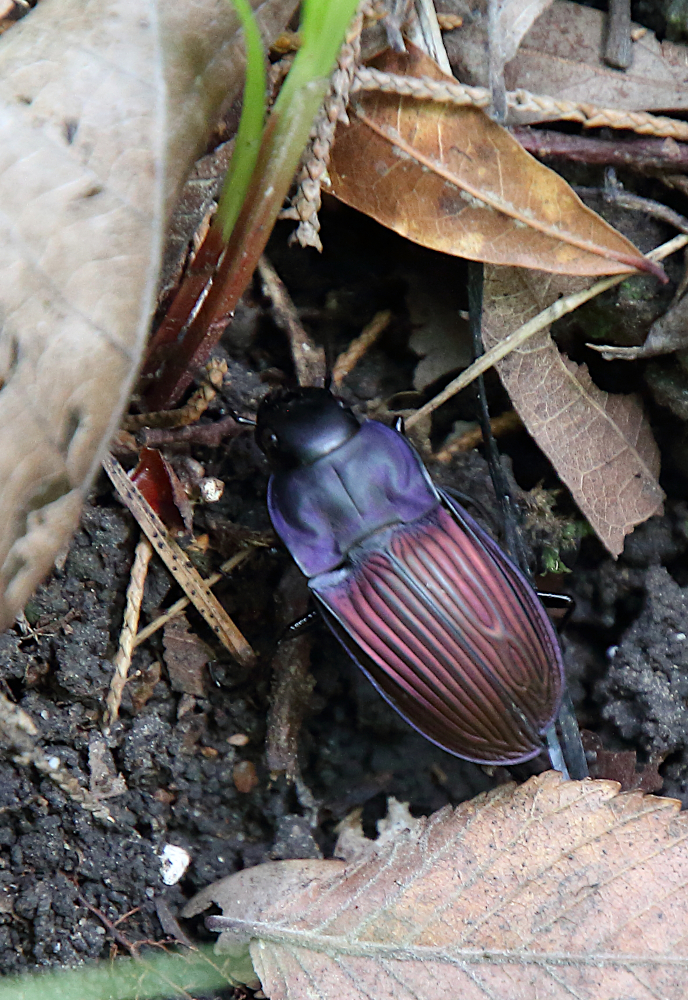

Scientific classification
- Kingdom: Animalia
- Phylum: Arthropoda
- Class: Insecta
- Order: Coleoptera
- Suborder: Adephaga
- Family: Carabidae
- Genus: Dicaelus
- Species: D. purpuratus

Binomial name
- Dicaelus purpuratus Bonelli, 1813

= Dicaelus purpuratus =

Species of beetle

Dicaelus purpuratus is a species of ground beetle in the family Carabidae. It is found in North America.

== Subspecies ==
These two subspecies belong to the species Dicaelus purpuratus:

- Dicaelus purpuratus purpuratus Bonelli, 1813
- Dicaelus purpuratus splendidus Say, 1823
