= Colpostoma =

Scientific classification
- Domain: Eukaryota
- Kingdom: Animalia
- Phylum: Arthropoda
- Class: Insecta
- Order: Coleoptera
- Suborder: Adephaga
- Family: Carabidae
- Subfamily: Licininae
- Tribe: Licinini
- Subtribe: Licinina
- Genus: Colpostoma; Semenov, 1889

Genus of beetles

Colpostoma is a genus in the beetle family Carabidae. There are about seven described species in Colpostoma.

== Species ==
These seven species belong to the genus Colpostoma:

- Colpostoma avinovi Semenov & Znojko, 1929 (Kyrgyzstan and Tadzhikistan)
- Colpostoma centrasiaticum Semenov & Znojko, 1929 (Kyrgyzstan)
- Colpostoma darvazicum Mikhailov, 1976 (Tadzhikistan)
- Colpostoma insigne Semenov, 1889 (Kyrgyzstan)
- Colpostoma petri Semenov & Znojko, 1929 (Kyrgyzstan)
- Colpostoma tshitsherini Semenov & Znojko, 1929 (Kyrgyzstan)
- Colpostoma turkestanicum Jedlicka, 1960 (Kazakhstan)
