= Dicaelus crenatus =

Scientific classification
- Domain: Eukaryota
- Kingdom: Animalia
- Phylum: Arthropoda
- Class: Insecta
- Order: Coleoptera
- Suborder: Adephaga
- Family: Carabidae
- Genus: Dicaelus
- Species: D. crenatus

Binomial name
- Dicaelus crenatus LeConte, 1853

Species of beetle

Dicaelus crenatus is a species of ground beetle in the family Carabidae. It is found in North America.
