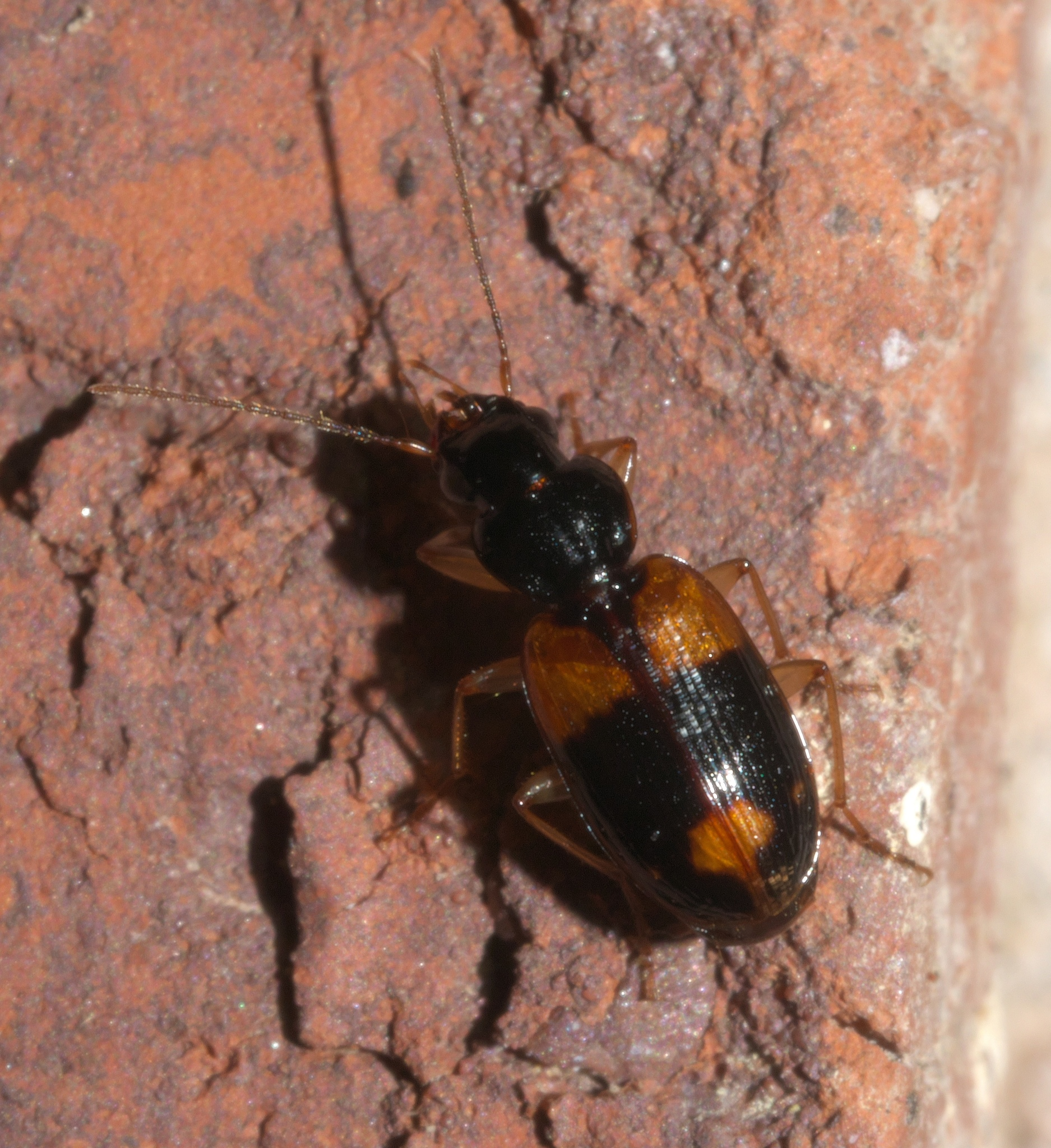
- Badister maculatus, Oklahoma

Scientific classification
- Domain: Eukaryota
- Kingdom: Animalia
- Phylum: Arthropoda
- Class: Insecta
- Order: Coleoptera
- Suborder: Adephaga
- Family: Carabidae
- Genus: Badister
- Species: B. maculatus

Binomial name
- Badister maculatus LeConte, 1853

= Badister maculatus =

Species of beetle

Badister maculatus is a species of ground beetle in the family Carabidae. It is found in North America, mainly east of the Rocky Mountains.
