= Badister parviceps =

Scientific classification
- Domain: Eukaryota
- Kingdom: Animalia
- Phylum: Arthropoda
- Class: Insecta
- Order: Coleoptera
- Suborder: Adephaga
- Family: Carabidae
- Genus: Badister
- Species: B. parviceps

Binomial name
- Badister parviceps Ball, 1959

Species of beetle

Badister parviceps is a species of ground beetle in the family Carabidae, which lives in North America.
