= Microzargus =

Scientific classification
- Domain: Eukaryota
- Kingdom: Animalia
- Phylum: Arthropoda
- Class: Insecta
- Order: Coleoptera
- Suborder: Adephaga
- Family: Carabidae
- Subfamily: Licininae
- Tribe: Licinini
- Subtribe: Lestignathina
- Genus: Microzargus; Sciaky & Facchini, 1997

Genus of beetles

Microzargus is a genus in the beetle family Carabidae. There are about seven described species in Microzargus.

== Species ==
These seven species belong to the genus Microzargus:

- Microzargus hartmanni Sciaky & Facchini, 1997 (Nepal)
- Microzargus nepalensis Sciaky & Facchini, 1997 (Nepal)
- Microzargus pakistanus B.Gueorguiev, 2013 (Pakistan)
- Microzargus schmidti Sciaky & Facchini, 1997 (Nepal)
- Microzargus sichuanus Sciaky & Facchini, 1997 (China)
- Microzargus tibetanus Facchini & Sciaky, 2002 (China)
- Microzargus wangtongensis Baehr & Aston, 2016 (China)
