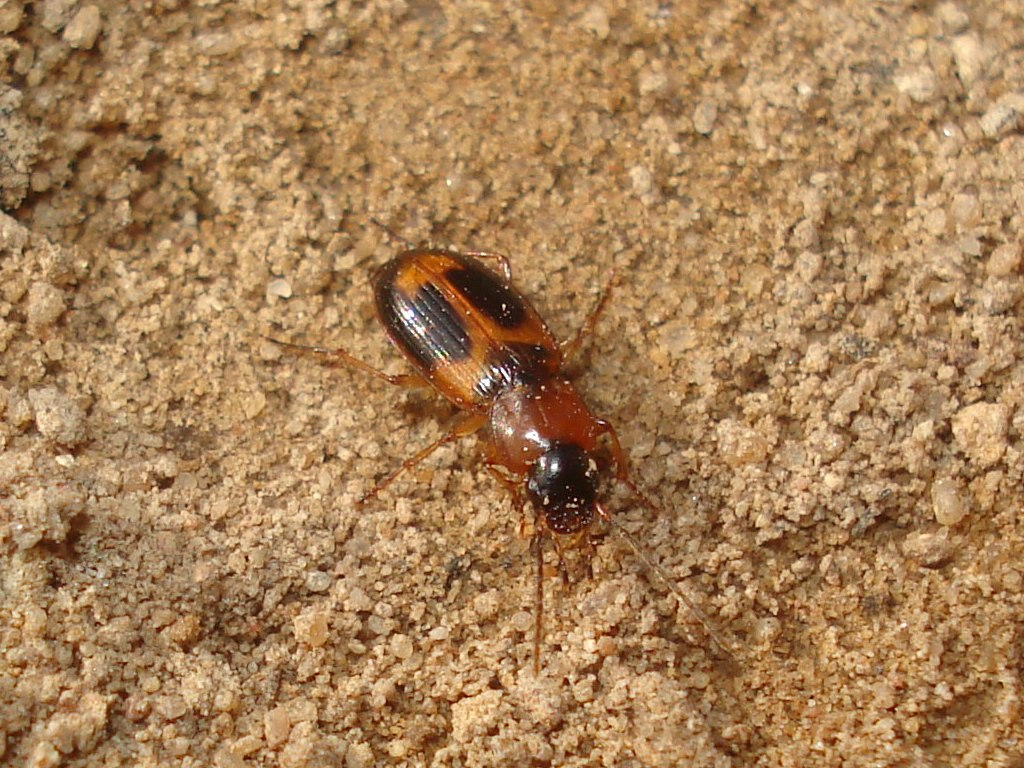

Scientific classification
- Kingdom: Animalia
- Phylum: Arthropoda
- Clade: Pancrustacea
- Class: Insecta
- Order: Coleoptera
- Suborder: Adephaga
- Family: Carabidae
- Genus: Badister
- Species: B. bullatus

Binomial name
- Badister bullatus (Schrank, 1798)

= Badister bullatus =

Species of beetle

Badister bullatus male

Badister bullatus is a species of ground beetle in the subfamily Licininae.

The species was first described as Carabus bullatus by Franz von Paula Schrank in 1798.

== Description ==
Badister bullatus is an orange and black ground beetle with a length of 5-6.55 millimeters.

It is commonly located in woodlands, river banks, and gardens.

It is situated most commonly in Northwestern Europe, but is also located in the rest of Europe and Western Siberia.
