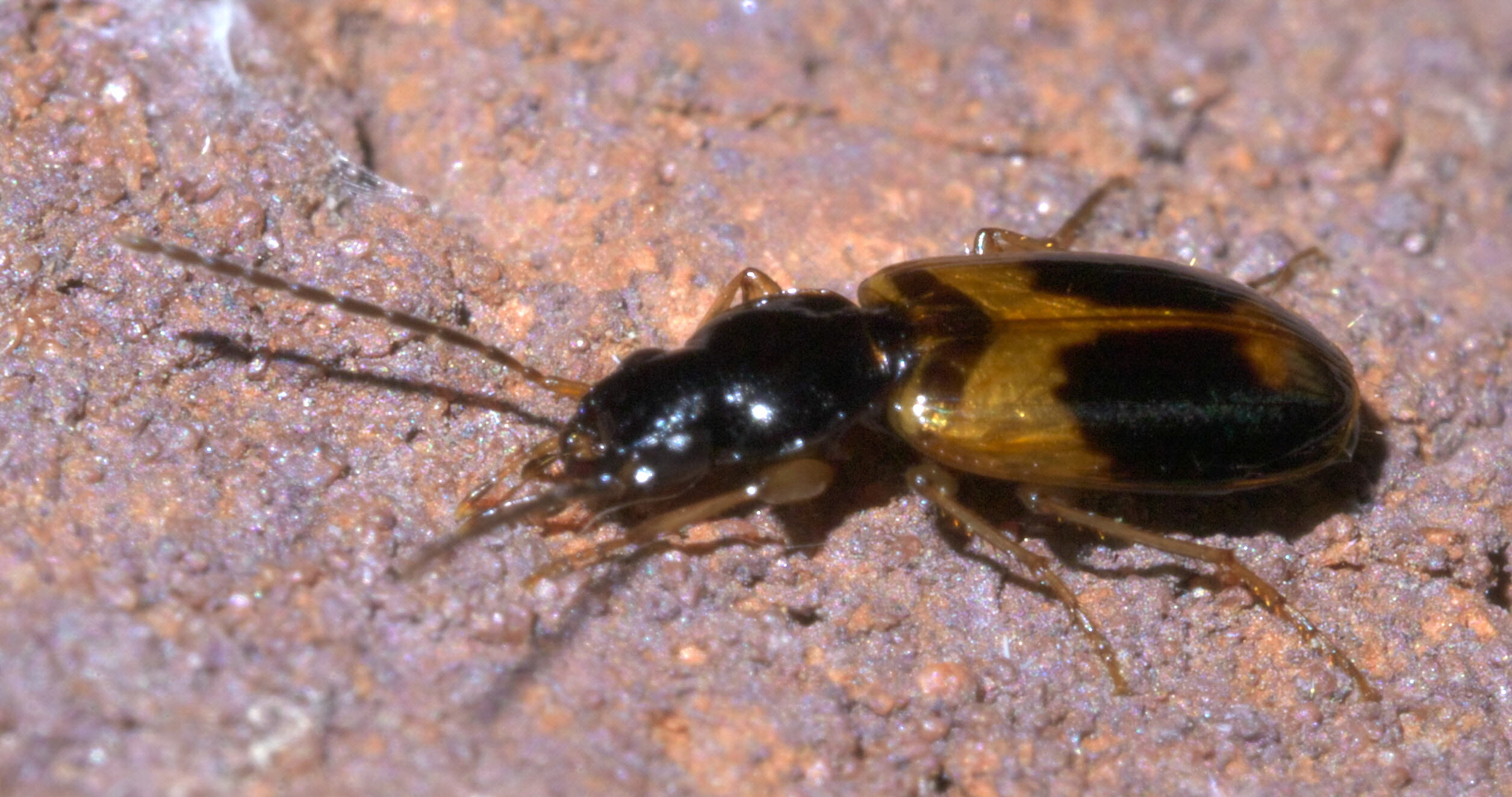
- Badister

Scientific classification
- Kingdom: Animalia
- Phylum: Arthropoda
- Class: Insecta
- Order: Coleoptera
- Suborder: Adephaga
- Family: Carabidae
- Subfamily: Licininae
- Tribe: Licinini; Bonelli, 1810

Subtribes
- Dicaelina Laporte, 1834; Dicrochilina Ball, 1992; Lestignathina Ball, 1992; Licinina Bonelli, 1810

= Licinini =

Tribe of beetles

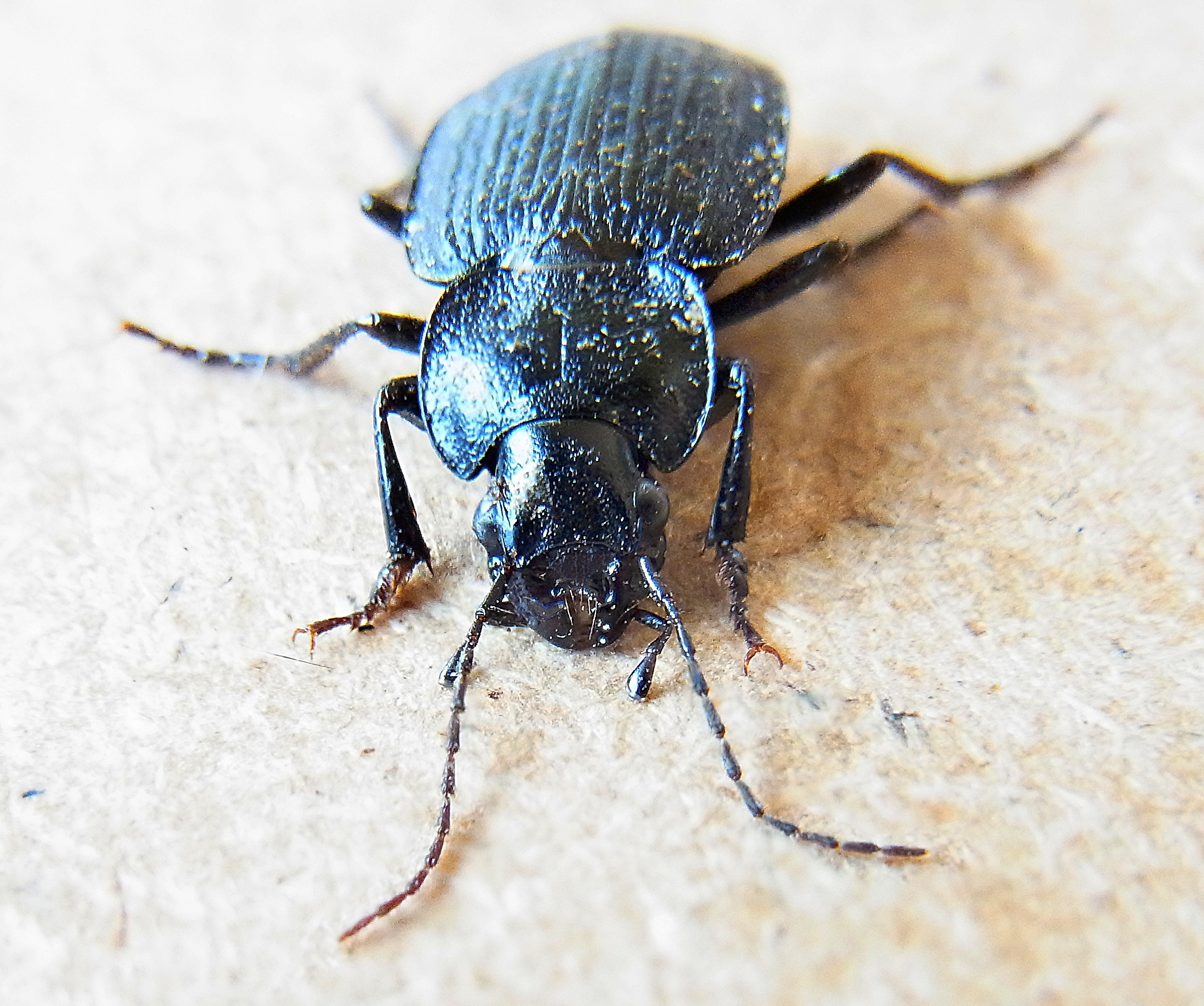
Licinus punctatulus

Licinini is a tribe of ground beetles in the family Carabidae. There are more than 20 genera and 240 described species in Licinini.

== Genera ==
These 21 genera belong to the tribe Licinini:

- Atrotus Péringuey, 1896
- Badister Clairville, 1806
- Colpostoma Semenov, 1889
- Derostichus Motschulsky, 1860
- Dicaelus Bonelli, 1813
- Dicrochile Guérin-Méneville, 1846
- Dilonchus Andrewes, 1936
- Diplocheila Brullé, 1835
- Eurygnathus Wollaston, 1854
- Eutogeneius Solier, 1849
- Hormacrus Sloane, 1898
- Lacordairia Laporte, 1867
- Lestignathus Erichson, 1842
- Licinus Latreille, 1802
- Microferonia Blackburn, 1890
- Microzargus Sciaky & Facchini, 1997
- Omestes Andrewes, 1933
- Physolaesthus Chaudoir, 1850
- Platylytron W.J.MacLeay, 1873
- Siagonyx W.J.MacLeay, 1871
- Zargus Wollaston, 1854
