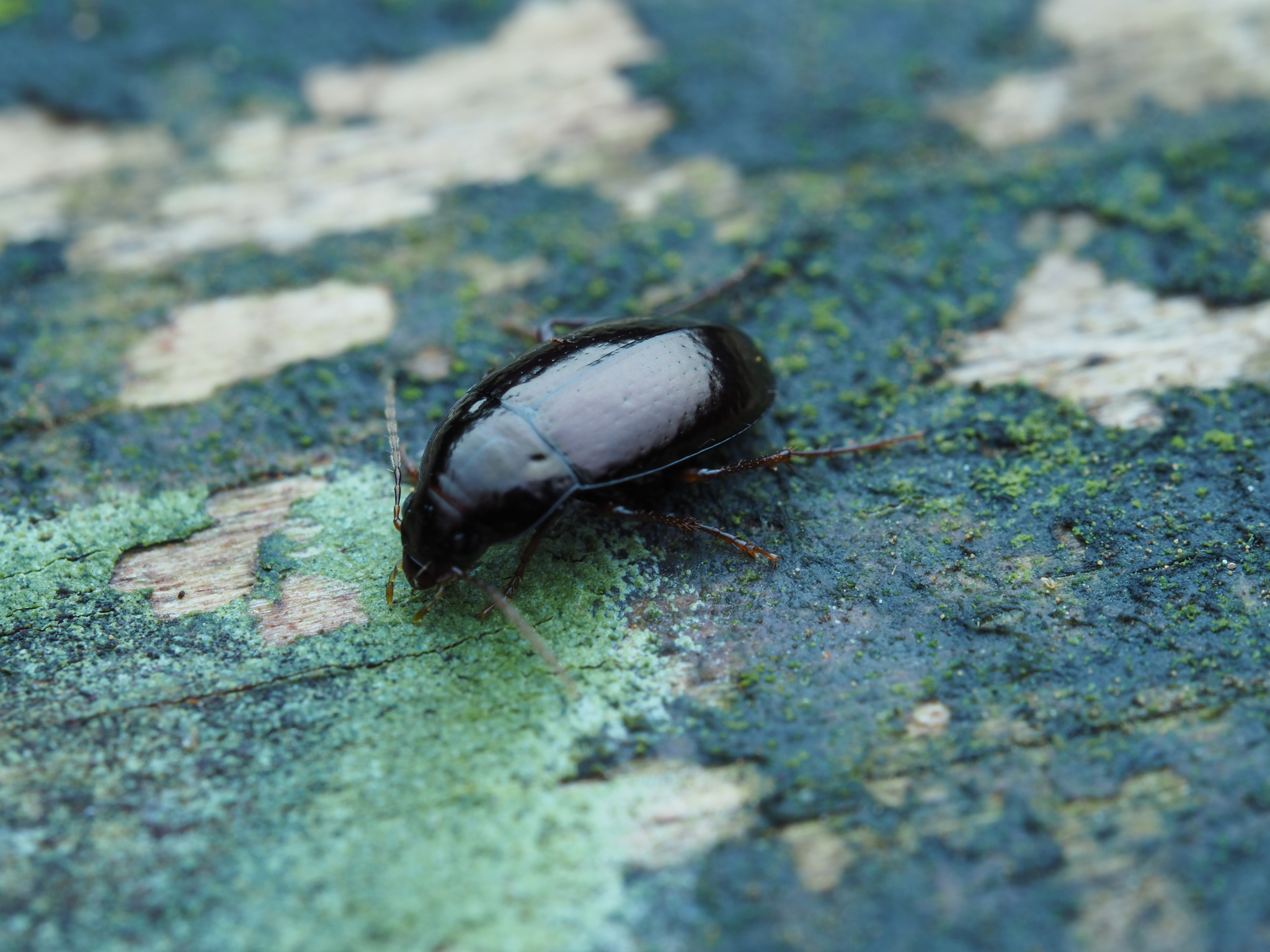
- Amarotypus edwardsii, New Zealand

Scientific classification
- Kingdom: Animalia
- Phylum: Arthropoda
- Class: Insecta
- Order: Coleoptera
- Suborder: Adephaga
- Family: Carabidae
- Subfamily: Migadopinae
- Tribe: Amarotypini; Erwin, 1985

Genera
- Amarotypus; Migadopiella

= Amarotypini =

Tribe of beetles

== Introduction ==
Amarotypines are a small tribe of ground beetles (Carabidae), recognised as a distinct tribe since 1985. The best known species is Amarotypus edwardsii of New Zealand, widely distributed throughout the three main islands, and arboreal in habits.

== Biodiversity and distribution ==
- Genus Amarotypus: New Zealand (1 sp.)
- Genus Migadopiella: Tasmania (2 spp.)
- NOTES: (1) Published taxonomic work on the tribe is currently very limited, and the presence of undescribed taxa in the South Island of New Zealand has been noted; (2) Migadopiella is somewhat provisionally included in Amarotypini

== Classification and phylogeny ==
Previously considered to be migadopines (before 1985), amarotypines are still often treated as forming a monophyletic subfamily Migadopinae with Migadopini, but the phylogeny may be (Amarotypini, (Migadopini, Elaphrini)). Alternatively, Amarotypini may form a clade with Promecognathini, again unrelated to Migadopini, though this possible relationship has been disputed.
