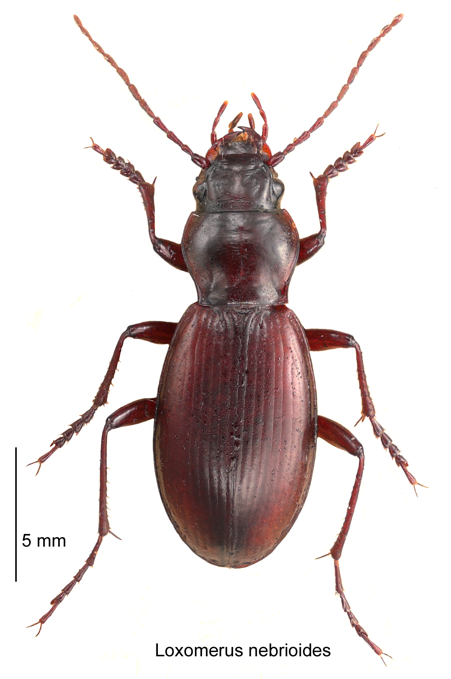
- Loxomerus nebrioides, New Zealand

Scientific classification
- Domain: Eukaryota
- Kingdom: Animalia
- Phylum: Arthropoda
- Class: Insecta
- Order: Coleoptera
- Suborder: Adephaga
- Family: Carabidae
- Subfamily: Migadopinae
- Tribe: Migadopini
- Genus: Loxomerus; Chaudoir, 1842

= Loxomerus =

Genus of beetles

Loxomerus is a genus of ground beetles in the family Carabidae. There are four described species in Loxomerus, found in New Zealand.

== Species ==
These four species belong to the genus Loxomerus:

- Loxomerus brevis (Blanchard, 1843)
- Loxomerus huttoni (Broun in Hutton & Broun, 1902)
- Loxomerus katote Johns, 2010
- Loxomerus nebrioides (Guérin-Méneville, 1841)
