= Dendromigadops =

Scientific classification
- Domain: Eukaryota
- Kingdom: Animalia
- Phylum: Arthropoda
- Class: Insecta
- Order: Coleoptera
- Suborder: Adephaga
- Family: Carabidae
- Subfamily: Migadopinae
- Tribe: Migadopini
- Genus: Dendromigadops; Baehr, 2013

Genus of beetles

Dendromigadops is a genus of ground beetles in the family Carabidae. There are at least two described species in Dendromigadops.

== Species ==
These two species belong to the genus Dendromigadops:

- Dendromigadops alticola Baehr, 2013 (Australia)
- Dendromigadops gloriosus Baehr, 2013 (Australia)
