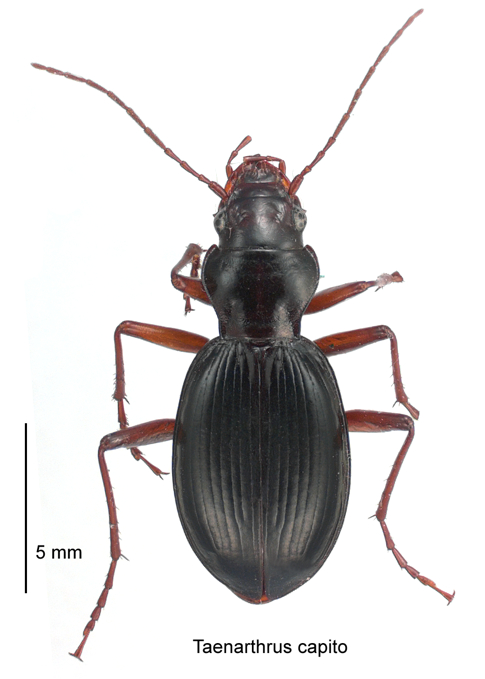
- Taenarthrus capito

Scientific classification
- Kingdom: Animalia
- Phylum: Arthropoda
- Class: Insecta
- Order: Coleoptera
- Suborder: Adephaga
- Family: Carabidae
- Subfamily: Migadopinae
- Tribe: Migadopini
- Genus: Taenarthrus; Broun, 1914

= Taenarthrus =

Genus of beetles

Taenarthrus is a genus of ground beetles in the family Carabidae. There are about 13 described species in Taenarthrus, found in New Zealand.

== Species ==
These 13 species belong to the genus Taenarthrus:

- Taenarthrus aenigmaticus Johns, 2010
- Taenarthrus aquatilis Johns, 2010
- Taenarthrus capito (Jeannel, 1938)
- Taenarthrus curvispinatus Johns, 2010
- Taenarthrus gelidimontanus Johns, 2010
- Taenarthrus latispinatus Johns, 2010
- Taenarthrus lissus Johns, 2010
- Taenarthrus minor Johns, 2010
- Taenarthrus obliteratus Johns, 2010
- Taenarthrus pakinius Johns, 2010
- Taenarthrus philpotti Broun, 1914
- Taenarthrus pluriciliatus Johns, 2010
- Taenarthrus ruaumokoi Johns, 2010
