= Monolobus =

Scientific classification
- Domain: Eukaryota
- Kingdom: Animalia
- Phylum: Arthropoda
- Class: Insecta
- Order: Coleoptera
- Suborder: Adephaga
- Family: Carabidae
- Subfamily: Migadopinae
- Tribe: Migadopini
- Genus: Monolobus; Solier, 1849

Genus of beetles

Monolobus is a genus of ground beetles in the family Carabidae. There are at least two described species in Monolobus.

== Species ==
These two species belong to the genus Monolobus:

- Monolobus ovalipennis Straneo, 1969 (Chile)
- Monolobus testaceus Solier, 1849 (Argentina and Chile)
