= Migadops =

Scientific classification
- Domain: Eukaryota
- Kingdom: Animalia
- Phylum: Arthropoda
- Class: Insecta
- Order: Coleoptera
- Suborder: Adephaga
- Family: Carabidae
- Subfamily: Migadopinae
- Tribe: Migadopini
- Genus: Migadops; G.R.Waterhouse, 1842

Genus of beetles

Migadops is a genus of ground beetles in the family Carabidae. There are at least two described species in Migadops.

== Species ==
These two species belong to the genus Migadops:

- Migadops jeanneli Nègre, 1972 (Chile)
- Migadops latus (Guérin-Méneville, 1841) (Argentina, Chile, and the Falkland Islands)
