= Pseudomigadops =

Scientific classification
- Domain: Eukaryota
- Kingdom: Animalia
- Phylum: Arthropoda
- Class: Insecta
- Order: Coleoptera
- Suborder: Adephaga
- Family: Carabidae
- Subfamily: Migadopinae
- Tribe: Migadopini
- Genus: Pseudomigadops; Jeannel, 1938

Genus of beetles

Pseudomigadops is a genus of ground beetles in the family Carabidae. There are about seven described species in Pseudomigadops.

== Species ==
These seven species belong to the genus Pseudomigadops:

- Pseudomigadops ater Straneo, 1969 (Chile)
- Pseudomigadops darwinii (G.R.Waterhouse, 1842) (Argentina and Chile)
- Pseudomigadops falklandicus (G.R.Waterhouse, 1842) (the Falkland Islands)
- Pseudomigadops fuscus Baehr, 1997 (the Falkland Islands)
- Pseudomigadops handkei Baehr, 1997 (the Falkland Islands)
- Pseudomigadops nigrocoeruleus (G.R.Waterhouse, 1842) (Argentina and Chile)
- Pseudomigadops ovalis (G.R.Waterhouse, 1842) (Argentina and Chile)
