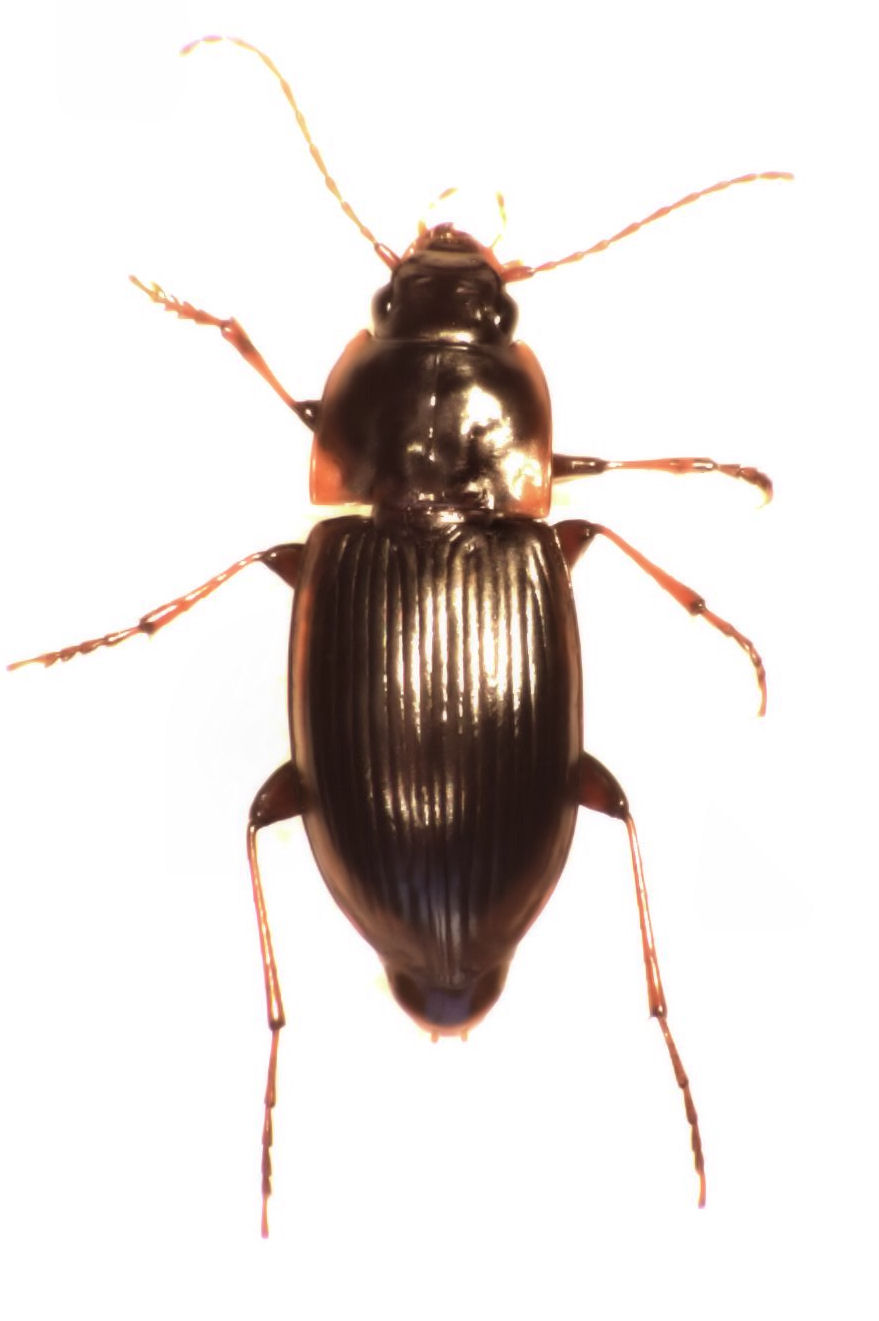

Scientific classification
- Kingdom: Animalia
- Phylum: Arthropoda
- Class: Insecta
- Order: Coleoptera
- Suborder: Adephaga
- Family: Carabidae
- Subfamily: Migadopinae
- Tribe: Migadopini
- Genus: Calathosoma; Jeannel, 1938
- Species: C. rubromarginatum

Binomial name
- Calathosoma rubromarginatum (Blanchard, 1843)

= Calathosoma =

Genus of beetles

Calathosoma is a genus of ground beetles in the family Carabidae. This genus has a single species, Calathosoma rubromarginatum. It is found in New Zealand.
