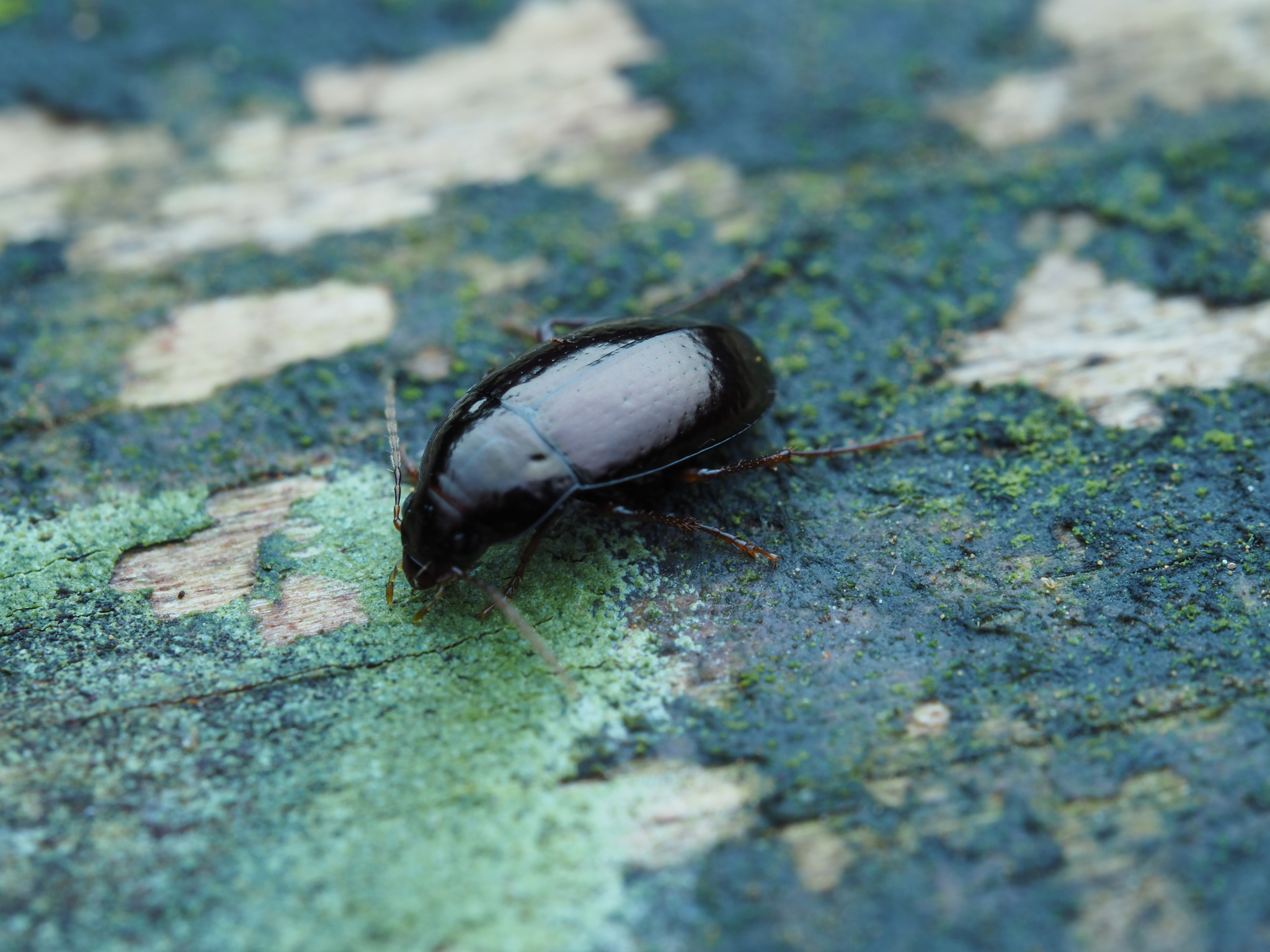
- Amarotypus edwardsii, New Zealand

Scientific classification
- Domain: Eukaryota
- Kingdom: Animalia
- Phylum: Arthropoda
- Class: Insecta
- Order: Coleoptera
- Suborder: Adephaga
- Family: Carabidae
- Subfamily: Migadopinae
- Tribe: Amarotypini
- Genus: Amarotypus; Bates, 1872
- Species: A. edwardsii

Binomial name
- Amarotypus edwardsii Bates, 1872

= Amarotypus =

Genus of beetles

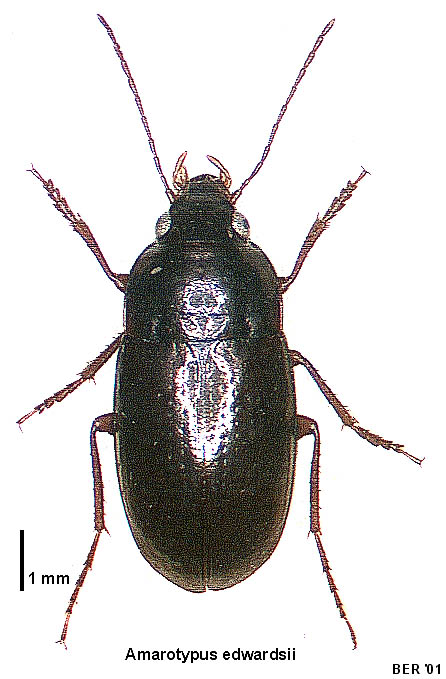
Amarotypus edwardsii

Amarotypus is a genus of ground beetles in the family Carabidae. This genus has a single species, Amarotypus edwardsii, found in New Zealand.

== Taxonomy ==
Both the genus and species were described by English naturalist Henry Walter Bates in 1872. Amarotypus is currently a monotypic genus, however there are potentially undescribed members of the genus who live in alpine areas of New Zealand.

== Description ==
A. edwardsii has well-developed hind wings, however is a flightless species.

== Distribution and habitat ==
The species is found throughout New Zealand at mid and low altitudes. The species is often found in association with Nothofagus forests.
