= Stichonotus =

Scientific classification
- Kingdom: Animalia
- Phylum: Arthropoda
- Class: Insecta
- Order: Coleoptera
- Suborder: Adephaga
- Family: Carabidae
- Subfamily: Migadopinae
- Tribe: Migadopini
- Genus: Stichonotus; Sloane, 1910

Genus of beetles

Stichonotus is a genus of ground beetles in the family Carabidae. There are at least four described species in Stichonotus.

== Species ==
These four species belong to the genus Stichonotus:

- Stichonotus decoloratus Baehr, 2013 (Australia)
- Stichonotus leai Sloane, 1910 (Australia)
- Stichonotus limbatus Sloane, 1915 (Australia)
- Stichonotus piceus Sloane, 1915 (Australia)
