= Rhytidognathus =

Scientific classification
- Domain: Eukaryota
- Kingdom: Animalia
- Phylum: Arthropoda
- Class: Insecta
- Order: Coleoptera
- Suborder: Adephaga
- Family: Carabidae
- Subfamily: Migadopinae
- Tribe: Migadopini
- Genus: Rhytidognathus; Chaudoir, 1861

Genus of beetles

Rhytidognathus is a genus of ground beetles in the family Carabidae. There are two described species in Rhytidognathus.

== Species ==
These two species belong to the genus Rhytidognathus:

- Rhytidognathus ovalis (Dejean, 1831) (Uruguay)
- Rhytidognathus platensis Roig-Juñent & Rouaux, 2012 (Argentina)
