= Calyptogonia =

Scientific classification
- Kingdom: Animalia
- Phylum: Arthropoda
- Class: Insecta
- Order: Coleoptera
- Suborder: Adephaga
- Family: Carabidae
- Subfamily: Migadopinae
- Tribe: Migadopini
- Genus: Calyptogonia; Sloane, 1920

Genus of beetles

Calyptogonia is a genus of ground beetles in the family Carabidae. There are at least two described species in Calyptogonia.

== Species ==
These two species belong to the genus Calyptogonia:

- Calyptogonia atra Sloane, 1920 (Australia)
- Calyptogonia lynetteae Baehr, 2013 (Australia)
