= Decogmus =

Scientific classification
- Kingdom: Animalia
- Phylum: Arthropoda
- Class: Insecta
- Order: Coleoptera
- Suborder: Adephaga
- Family: Carabidae
- Tribe: Migadopini
- Genus: Decogmus; Sloane, 1915
- Species: D. chalybeus

Binomial name
- Decogmus chalybeus Sloane, 1915

Genus of beetles

Decogmus is a genus of ground beetles in the family Carabidae. This genus has a single species, Decogmus chalybeus. It is found in Australia.
