= Aquilex =

Scientific classification
- Domain: Eukaryota
- Kingdom: Animalia
- Phylum: Arthropoda
- Class: Insecta
- Order: Coleoptera
- Suborder: Adephaga
- Family: Carabidae
- Tribe: Migadopini
- Genus: Aquilex; Moret, 1989
- Species: A. diabolicola

Binomial name
- Aquilex diabolicola Moret, 1989

Genus of beetles

Aquilex is a genus of ground beetles in the family Carabidae. This genus has a single species, Aquilex diabolicola. It is found in Ecuador.
