= Nebriosoma =

Scientific classification
- Domain: Eukaryota
- Kingdom: Animalia
- Phylum: Arthropoda
- Class: Insecta
- Order: Coleoptera
- Suborder: Adephaga
- Family: Carabidae
- Tribe: Migadopini
- Genus: Nebriosoma; Laporte, 1867
- Species: N. fallax

Binomial name
- Nebriosoma fallax Laporte, 1867

Genus of beetles

Nebriosoma is a genus of ground beetles in the family Carabidae. This genus has a single species, Nebriosoma fallax. It is found in Australia.
