= Antarctonomus =

Scientific classification
- Kingdom: Animalia
- Phylum: Arthropoda
- Class: Insecta
- Order: Coleoptera
- Suborder: Adephaga
- Family: Carabidae
- Tribe: Migadopini
- Genus: Antarctonomus; Chaudoir, 1861
- Species: A. complanatus

Binomial name
- Antarctonomus complanatus (Blanchard, 1843)

Genus of beetles

Antarctonomus is a genus of ground beetles in the family Carabidae. This genus has a single species, Antarctonomus complanatus. It is found in South America, Argentina, and Chile.
