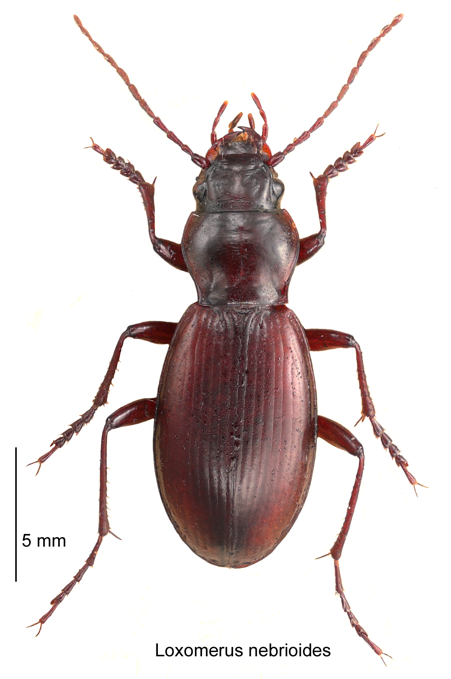
- Loxomerus nebrioides, New Zealand

Scientific classification
- Domain: Eukaryota
- Kingdom: Animalia
- Phylum: Arthropoda
- Class: Insecta
- Order: Coleoptera
- Suborder: Adephaga
- Family: Carabidae
- Subfamily: Migadopinae
- Tribe: Migadopini; Chaudoir, 1861

= Migadopini =

Tribe of beetles

Migadopini is a tribe of ground beetles in the family Carabidae. There are about 16 genera and more than 40 described species in Migadopini.

== Genera ==
These 16 genera belong to the tribe Migadopini:

- Antarctonomus Chaudoir, 1861 (South America)
- Aquilex Moret, 1989 (Ecuador)
- Calathosoma Jeannel, 1938 (New Zealand)
- Calyptogonia Sloane, 1920 (Australia)
- Decogmus Sloane, 1915 (Australia)
- Dendromigadops Baehr, 2013 (Australia)
- Lissopterus G.R.Waterhouse, 1843 (South America)
- Loxomerus Chaudoir, 1842 (New Zealand)
- Migadopidius Jeannel, 1938 (Chile)
- Migadops G.R.Waterhouse, 1842 (South America)
- Monolobus Solier, 1849 (Argentina and Chile)
- Nebriosoma Laporte, 1867 (Australia)
- Pseudomigadops Jeannel, 1938 (Argentina, Chile, Falkland Islands)
- Rhytidognathus Chaudoir, 1861 (Argentina, Uruguay)
- Stichonotus Sloane, 1910 (Australia)
- Taenarthrus Broun, 1914 (New Zealand)
