= Migadopidius =

Scientific classification
- Domain: Eukaryota
- Kingdom: Animalia
- Phylum: Arthropoda
- Class: Insecta
- Order: Coleoptera
- Suborder: Adephaga
- Family: Carabidae
- Tribe: Migadopini
- Genus: Migadopidius; Jeannel, 1938
- Species: M. bimaculatus

Binomial name
- Migadopidius bimaculatus (E.C.Reed, 1874)

Genus of beetles

Migadopidius is a genus of ground beetles in the family Carabidae. This genus has a single species, Migadopidius bimaculatus. It is found in Chile.
