= Lissopterus hyadesii =

Scientific classification
- Kingdom: Animalia
- Phylum: Arthropoda
- Class: Insecta
- Order: Coleoptera
- Suborder: Adephaga
- Superfamily: Caraboidea
- Family: Carabidae
- Genus: Lissopterus
- Species: L. hyadesii

Binomial name
- Lissopterus hyadesii Fairmaire, 1885

Species of beetles

Lissopterus hyadesii is a species in the beetle family Carabidae. It is found in Chile, Argentina, and the Falkland Islands.

== Subspecies ==
These two subspecies belong to the species Lissopterus hyadesii:

- Lissopterus hyadesii falklandicus Jeannel, 1938 (the Falkland Islands)
- Lissopterus hyadesii hyadesii Fairmaire, 1885 (Chile and Argentina)
