= Lissopterus quadrinotatus =

Scientific classification
- Kingdom: Animalia
- Phylum: Arthropoda
- Class: Insecta
- Order: Coleoptera
- Suborder: Adephaga
- Family: Carabidae
- Genus: Lissopterus
- Species: L. quadrinotatus

Binomial name
- Lissopterus quadrinotatus Waterhouse, 1843

Species of beetles

Lissopterus quadrinotatus is a species of beetles in the family Carabidae.
