= Lissopterus =

Scientific classification
- Domain: Eukaryota
- Kingdom: Animalia
- Phylum: Arthropoda
- Class: Insecta
- Order: Coleoptera
- Suborder: Adephaga
- Superfamily: Caraboidea
- Family: Carabidae
- Genus: Lissopterus; G.R.Waterhouse, 1843

Genus of beetles

Lissopterus is a genus of ground beetles in the family Carabidae. There are at least two described species in Lissopterus.

== Species ==
These two species belong to the genus Lissopterus:

- Lissopterus hyadesii Fairmaire, 1885 (Argentina, Chile, and the Falkland Islands)
- Lissopterus quadrinotatus G.R.Waterhouse, 1843 (Argentina, Chile, and the Falkland Islands)
