= Migadopiella =

Scientific classification
- Domain: Eukaryota
- Kingdom: Animalia
- Phylum: Arthropoda
- Class: Insecta
- Order: Coleoptera
- Suborder: Adephaga
- Family: Carabidae
- Genus: Migadopiella; Baehr, 2009

Genus of beetles

Migadopiella is a genus of beetles belonging to the family Carabidae.

The species of this genus are found in Southern Australia.

== Species ==
Species:

- Migadopiella convexipennis Baehr, 2009
- Migadopiella octoguttata Baehr, 2009
