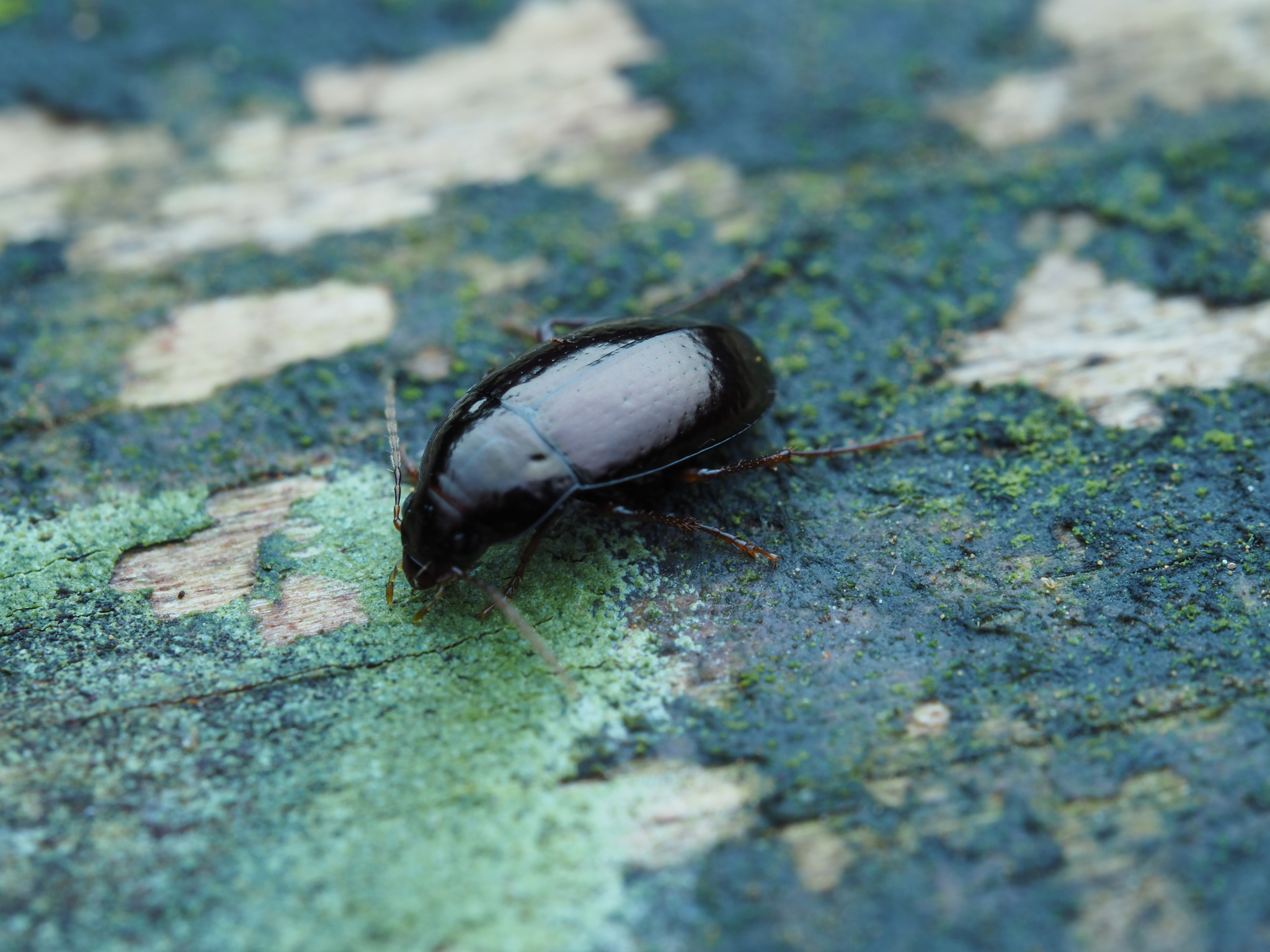
- Amarotypus edwardsii, New Zealand

Scientific classification
- Domain: Eukaryota
- Kingdom: Animalia
- Phylum: Arthropoda
- Class: Insecta
- Order: Coleoptera
- Suborder: Adephaga
- Family: Carabidae
- Subfamily: Migadopinae; Chaudoir, 1861

= Migadopinae =

Subfamily of beetles

Migadopinae is a subfamily of ground beetles in the family Carabidae. There are about 18 genera and more than 40 described species in Migadopinae.

== Tribes ==
These 2 tribes belong to the subfamily Migadopinae:

- Amarotypini Erwin, 1985 (2 genera found in Australia and New Zealand)
- Migadopini Chaudoir, 1861 (16 genera found in Australia, New Zealand, and South America)
