= Callistomimus =

Scientific classification
- Domain: Eukaryota
- Kingdom: Animalia
- Phylum: Arthropoda
- Class: Insecta
- Order: Coleoptera
- Suborder: Adephaga
- Family: Carabidae
- Subfamily: Harpalinae
- Tribe: Chlaeniini
- Subtribe: Callistina
- Genus: Callistomimus; Chaudoir, 1872

Genus of beetles

Callistomimus is a genus in the beetle family Carabidae. There are more than 80 described species in Callistomimus.

== Species ==
These 81 species belong to the genus Callistomimus:

- Callistomimus acuticollis (Fairmaire, 1889) (China)
- Callistomimus aeolus Andrewes, 1937 (Myanmar)
- Callistomimus alluaudi Maindron, 1909 (Africa)
- Callistomimus alternans Andrewes, 1938 (Indonesia)
- Callistomimus amoenus Péringuey, 1896 (South Africa)
- Callistomimus asper Andrewes, 1930 (Indonesia)
- Callistomimus azarensis Britton, 1937 (Nigeria)
- Callistomimus belli Andrewes, 1921 (India)
- Callistomimus bicolor Britton, 1937 (Zambia)
- Callistomimus bimaculatus Britton, 1937 (Democratic Republic of the Congo)
- Callistomimus caffer (Boheman, 1848) (Zimbabwe and South Africa)
- Callistomimus cauliops (Bates, 1892) (Myanmar)
- Callistomimus chalcocephalus (Wiedemann, 1823) (Indomalaya)
- Callistomimus chevalieri Alluaud, 1932 (Chad)
- Callistomimus chlorocephalus (Kollar, 1836) (India)
- Callistomimus coarctatus (LaFerté-Sénectère, 1851) (Pakistan, Nepal, and India)
- Callistomimus convexicollis Britton, 1937 (Democratic Republic of the Congo and Zambia)
- Callistomimus cyclotus Andrewes, 1938 (Indonesia)
- Callistomimus dabreui Andrewes, 1921 (India)
- Callistomimus davidsoni Mandl, 1986 (Nepal)
- Callistomimus depressus Britton, 1937 (Zambia)
- Callistomimus dicksoni C.O.Waterhouse, 1884 (Taiwan)
- Callistomimus dilaceratus Kolbe, 1889 (Democratic Republic of the Congo)
- Callistomimus diversus Barker, 1922 (Democratic Republic of the Congo and South Africa)
- Callistomimus dollmani Britton, 1937 (Zambia)
- Callistomimus dux Andrewes, 1921 (Myanmar)
- Callistomimus elegans (Boheman, 1848) (South Africa)
- Callistomimus exsul Kuntzen, 1919 (Namibia)
- Callistomimus gabonicus Alluaud, 1932 (Gabon and Democratic Republic of the Congo)
- Callistomimus garouaensis Kirschenhofer, 2008 (Mali and Cameroon)
- Callistomimus gracilis Andrewes, 1931 (India)
- Callistomimus gratus Péringuey, 1896 (Zambia, Zimbabwe, and South Africa)
- Callistomimus guineensis Alluaud, 1932 (Cameroon)
- Callistomimus guttatus Chaudoir, 1872 (South Africa)
- Callistomimus hamerae (Kirschenhofer, 2008)
- Callistomimus hovanus Fairmaire, 1901 (Madagascar)
- Callistomimus insuetus Péringuey, 1896 (Mozambique)
- Callistomimus jucundus Andrewes, 1921 (India)
- Callistomimus kilimanus Alluaud, 1932 (Tanzania)
- Callistomimus latefasciatus Britton, 1937 (Zambia)
- Callistomimus lebioides (Bates, 1892) (India, Myanmar, and Indonesia)
- Callistomimus littoralis (Motschulsky, 1860) (Sri Lanka and India)
- Callistomimus makondeensis (Kirschenhofer, 2008)
- Callistomimus maurus (Mandl, 1986) (Nepal)
- Callistomimus modestus (Schaum, 1863) (China, Japan, Indomalaya)
- Callistomimus nair (Maindron, 1909) (India)
- Callistomimus narobiensis Kirschenhofer, 2008 (Kenya and Tanzania)
- Callistomimus nepalensis Habu, 1978 (Nepal)
- Callistomimus nigropunctatostriatus Mandl, 1986 (China)
- Callistomimus nodieri Alluaud, 1932 (Africa)
- Callistomimus obscurus Barker, 1922 (South Africa)
- Callistomimus okutanii Habu, 1952 (China)
- Callistomimus pachys Alluaud, 1932
- Callistomimus panganiensis (Kirschenhofer, 2008)
- Callistomimus pernix Andrewes, 1936 (Sri Lanka)
- Callistomimus philippinus Jedlicka, 1935 (Philippines)
- Callistomimus placens Péringuey, 1904
- Callistomimus pseudojucundus (Mandl, 1986) (Nepal)
- Callistomimus quadricolor (Putzeys, 1877) (Indomalaya)
- Callistomimus quadriguttatus (Putzeys, 1877) (India)
- Callistomimus quadrimaculatus Kolbe, 1889 (Democratic Republic of the Congo)
- Callistomimus quadripustulatus (Gory, 1833) (South Africa)
- Callistomimus quinquemaculatus (LaFerté-Sénectère, 1851)
- Callistomimus rivularis Alluaud, 1932 (Democratic Republic of the Congo and Tanzania)
- Callistomimus rubellus (Bates, 1892) (India and Myanmar)
- Callistomimus rubricosus Alluaud, 1932 (Africa)
- Callistomimus rufiventris Britton, 1937 (Zimbabwe)
- Callistomimus rugosus Britton, 1937 (Zambia)
- Callistomimus senegalensis Kirschenhofer, 2009 (Senegal/Gambia)
- Callistomimus sennariensis Alluaud, 1932 (Sudan)
- Callistomimus sexpustulatus (Boheman, 1848) (South Africa)
- Callistomimus sikkimensis Andrewes, 1921 (India)
- Callistomimus sinicola Mandl, 1981 (China)
- Callistomimus strigipennis (Fairmaire, 1901) (Madagascar)
- Callistomimus subnotatus Andrewes, 1921 (Cambodia)
- Callistomimus suturalis (Fleutiaux, 1887) (Vietnam)
- Callistomimus trichros Andrewes, 1936 (Indonesia)
- Callistomimus tumidipes Britton, 1937 (Ivory Coast and Zambia)
- Callistomimus venustus Andrewes, 1921 (Laos)
- Callistomimus virescens Andrewes, 1921 (Myanmar)
- Callistomimus vitalisi Andrewes, 1921 (Vietnam)
