= Callistomimus elegans =

Scientific classification
- Kingdom: Animalia
- Phylum: Arthropoda
- Class: Insecta
- Order: Coleoptera
- Suborder: Adephaga
- Family: Carabidae
- Subfamily: Harpalinae
- Tribe: Chlaeniini
- Subtribe: Callistina
- Genus: Callistomimus
- Species: C. elegans

Binomial name
- Callistomimus elegans (Boheman, 1848)

Species of beetle

Callistomimus elegans is a species in the beetle family Carabidae. It is found in South Africa.
