= List of Agonum species =

This is a list of 212 species in the genus Agonum.

== Agonum species ==
- Agonum abnormale Jedlicka, 1960
- Agonum acuticolle Motschulsky, 1864
- Agonum aequatum (Jedlicka, 1936)
- Agonum aeruginosum Dejean, 1828
- Agonum affine Kirby, 1837
- Agonum albicrus Dejean, 1828
- Agonum anchomenoides Randall, 1838
- Agonum angulifer (Casey, 1920)
- Agonum antennarium (Duftschmid, 1812)
- Agonum anthracinum Dejean, 1831
- Agonum antiquum Piton, 1940
- Agonum apex (Jedlicka, 1940)
- Agonum ardoisi Puel, 1938
- Agonum arisanum (Jedlicka, 1940)
- Agonum atlantis Antoine, 1957
- Agonum atricomes (Bates, 1873)
- Agonum aurelius (Bates, 1883)
- Agonum azumai (Habu, 1973)
- Agonum basale LeConte, 1846
- Agonum belleri (Hatch, 1933) (Beller's ground beetle)
- Agonum bellicum Lutshnik, 1934
- Agonum bicolor (Dejean, 1828)
- Agonum brevicolle Dejean, 1828
- Agonum bulgani Jedlicka, 1969
- Agonum canadense Goulet, 1969
- Agonum carbonarium Dejean, 1828
- Agonum causticum (LaFerté-Sénectère, 1853)
- Agonum chalcomum (Bates, 1873)
- Agonum chalconotum Ménétriès, 1832
- Agonum charillus (Bates, 1883)
- Agonum cheni (Morvan & Tian, 2001)
- Agonum chinense (Boheman, 1858)
- Agonum collare (Say, 1830)
- Agonum comatum (Andrewes, 1923)
- Agonum consimile (Gyllenhal, 1810)
- Agonum coptoderoides Darlington, 1937
- Agonum corvus (LeConte, 1860)
- Agonum crenistriatum (LeConte, 1863)
- Agonum crenulatum (LeConte, 1854)
- Agonum cupreum Dejean, 1831
- Agonum cupripenne (Say, 1823)
- Agonum curtipenne Casey, 1920
- Agonum cyanopis (Bates, 1882)
- Agonum cyclifer (Bates, 1884)
- Agonum daimio (Bates, 1873)
- Agonum darlingtoni Lindroth, 1954
- Agonum deceptivum (LeConte, 1879)
- Agonum decorum (Say, 1823)
- Agonum deplanatum Ménétriés, 1843
- Agonum deuvei (Morvan, 1999)
- Agonum deuveiellum (Morvan, 2006)
- Agonum dolens (C.R.Sahlberg, 1827)
- Agonum dorsostriatum Fairmaire, 1889
- Agonum dreuxi Jedlicka, 1968
- Agonum duftschmidi J.Schmidt, 1994
- Agonum elongatulum (Dejean, 1828)
- Agonum emarginatum (Gyllenhal, 1827)
- Agonum ericeti (Panzer, 1809)
- Agonum errans (Say, 1823)
- Agonum erythropus Fischer von Waldheim, 1829
- Agonum euroum (Andrewes, 1924)
- Agonum eurydamas (Bates, 1883)
- Agonum exaratum (Mannerheim, 1853)
- Agonum excavatum Dejean, 1828
- Agonum extensicolle (Say, 1823)
- Agonum extimum Liebherr, 1986
- Agonum fallax (A.Morawitz, 1862)
- Agonum fallianum (Leng, 1918)
- Agonum ferreum Haldeman, 1843
- Agonum ferruginosum (Dejean, 1828)
- Agonum fidele Casey, 1920
- Agonum fossiger Dejean, 1828
- Agonum fuliginosum (Panzer, 1809)
- Agonum galvestonicum (Casey, 1920)
- Agonum gerdmuelleri J.Schmidt, 1994
- Agonum gisellae Csiki, 1931
- Agonum gracile Sturm, 1824
- Agonum gracilipes (Duftschmid, 1812)
- Agonum graciloides Jedlicka, 1946
- Agonum gratiosum (Mannerheim, 1853)
- Agonum guangdongense (Morvan & Tian, 2001)
- Agonum harrisii LeConte, 1846
- Agonum hiranoi Habu, 1972
- Agonum hirashimai Habu, 1954
- Agonum holzschuhi Morvan, 2002
- Agonum humerosum (Semenov, 1889)
- Agonum hypocrita (Apfelbeck, 1904)
- Agonum illocatum (Walker, 1858)
- Agonum imitans (Notman, 1919)
- Agonum impressum (Panzer, 1796)
- Agonum inaequale Putzeys, 1875
- Agonum indiae (Louwerens, 1953)
- Agonum iriomotense (Habu, 1973)
- Agonum ishidai (Ohkura & Shibata, 1963)
- Agonum jankowskii Lafer, 1992
- Agonum japonicum (Motschulsky, 1860)
- Agonum jurecekianum Jedlicka, 1952
- Agonum kesharishresthae (Morvan, 1999)
- Agonum kucerai (Morvan, 2002)
- Agonum kurosonense Habu, 1957
- Agonum kyushuense Habu, 1954
- Agonum ladakense (Bates, 1878)
- Agonum laetificum Darlington, 1935
- Agonum lampros (Bates, 1873)
- Agonum leucomerum (Perroud, 1864)
- Agonum liebherri J.Schmidt, 2008
- Agonum limbaticolle (Gemminger & Harold, 1868)
- Agonum limbatum Motschulsky, 1845
- Agonum longicorne Chaudoir, 1846
- Agonum luczoti Laporte, 1835
- Agonum lugens (Duftschmid, 1812)
- Agonum luteum (Andrewes, 1923)
- Agonum lutulentum (LeConte, 1854)
- Agonum madagascariense (Chaudoir, 1843)
- Agonum mandli Jedlicka, 1933
- Agonum marginatum (Linnaeus, 1758)
- Agonum maruokai (Habu, 1973)
- Agonum melanarium Dejean, 1828
- Agonum menetriesii Faldermann, 1839
- Agonum mesostictum (Bates, 1889)
- Agonum metallescens (LeConte, 1854)
- Agonum micans (Nicolai, 1822)
- Agonum modestius (Bates, 1873)
- Agonum moerens Dejean, 1828
- Agonum mokoto Burgeon, 1937
- Agonum monachum (Duftschmid, 1812)
- Agonum mongolicum Shilenkov, 1993
- Agonum muelleri (Herbst, 1784)
- Agonum muiri Liebherr, 1984
- Agonum munsteri (Hellén, 1935)
- Agonum mutatum (Gemminger & Harold, 1868)
- Agonum nanum Jedlicka, 1965
- Agonum nigriceps LeConte, 1846
- Agonum nigrum Dejean, 1828
- Agonum nipponicum Habu, 1972
- Agonum numidicum (Lucas, 1846)
- Agonum nutans (Say, 1823)
- Agonum obesum (Morvan & Tian, 2001)
- Agonum octopunctatum (Fabricius, 1798)
- Agonum oryctus (Andrewes, 1933)
- Agonum pacificum Casey, 1920
- Agonum pallipes (Fabricius, 1787)
- Agonum palustre Goulet, 1969
- Agonum pangxiongfeii (Morvan & Tian, 2001)
- Agonum parextimum Liebherr, 1986
- Agonum patinale Bates, 1882
- Agonum pelidnum (Herbst, 1784)
- Agonum permoestum Puel, 1938
- Agonum persecretum Antoine, 1941
- Agonum piceolum (LeConte, 1879)
- Agonum piceum (Linnaeus, 1758)
- Agonum picicornoides Lindroth, 1966
- Agonum placidum (Say, 1823)
- Agonum platyderum (Chaudoir, 1854)
- Agonum praetor (Andrewes, 1930)
- Agonum propinquum (Gemminger & Harold, 1868)
- Agonum pseudomoestum Schuler, 1963
- Agonum punctiforme (Say, 1823)
- Agonum quadrimaculatum (G. Horn, 1885)
- Agonum quadripustulatum (Dejean, 1831)
- Agonum quinquepunctatum Motschulsky, 1844
- Agonum retractum LeConte, 1846
- Agonum rigidulum (Casey, 1920)
- Agonum rotundicolle (Motschulsky, 1865)
- Agonum rougerieanum (Morvan, 2006)
- Agonum ruficorne2 Fischer von Waldheim, 1829
- Agonum rufipes Dejean, 1828
- Agonum rufotestaceum Jedlicka, 1960
- Agonum rugaticolle (Gemminger & Harold, 1868)
- Agonum rugicolle Chaudoir, 1846
- Agonum sataense Habu, 1954
- Agonum scintillans (Boheman, 1858)
- Agonum scitulum Dejean, 1828
- Agonum scotti Burgeon, 1937
- Agonum sculptipes (Bates, 1883)
- Agonum scutifer (Bates, 1878)
- Agonum scutiferum Bates, 1878
- Agonum semicupreum Fairmaire, 1887
- Agonum sexpunctatum (Linnaeus, 1758)
- Agonum shibatai (Ueno, 1964)
- Agonum shibataianum (Habu, 1974)
- Agonum shirahatai Habu, 1954
- Agonum simile Kirby, 1837
- Agonum sordens Kirby, 1837
- Agonum sordidum Dejean, 1828
- Agonum speculator (Harold, 1878)
- Agonum stenuiti Morvan, 1998
- Agonum straeleni (Basilewsky, 1953)
- Agonum striatopunctatum Dejean, 1828
- Agonum suavissimum (Bates, 1883)
- Agonum subtruncatum (Motschulsky, 1860)
- Agonum sulcipenne (G. Horn, 1881)
- Agonum superioris Lindroth, 1966
- Agonum suturale Say, 1830
- Agonum sylphides (Habu, 1975)
- Agonum sylphis (Bates, 1873)
- Agonum tenue (LeConte, 1854)
- Agonum teruyai (Habu, 1975)
- Agonum texanum (LeConte, 1878)
- Agonum thoracicum2 Fischer von Waldheim, 1829
- Agonum thoreyi Dejean, 1828
- Agonum tokarae (Habu, 1974)
- Agonum trigeminum Lindroth, 1954
- Agonum triimpressum (R.F.Sahlberg, 1844)
- Agonum triseriatum (Chaudoir, 1854)
- Agonum tropicum Motschulsky, 1864
- Agonum tsushimanum Habu & Baba, 1959
- Agonum uenoi Habu, 1971
- Agonum variolatum (LeConte, 1851)
- Agonum versutum Sturm, 1824
- Agonum viduum (Panzer, 1796)
- Agonum viridicans (Andrewes, 1926)
- Agonum viridicupreum (Goeze, 1777)
- Agonum yamatonis (Habu, 1975)
