= Agonum nitidum =

Scientific classification
- Domain: Eukaryota
- Kingdom: Animalia
- Phylum: Arthropoda
- Class: Insecta
- Order: Coleoptera
- Suborder: Adephaga
- Family: Carabidae
- Genus: Agonum
- Species: A. nitidum

Binomial name
- Agonum nitidum Motschulsky, 1844

Species of beetle

Agonum nitidum is a species of ground beetle in the genus Agonum.
