= Agonum acuticolle =

Scientific classification
- Domain: Eukaryota
- Kingdom: Animalia
- Phylum: Arthropoda
- Class: Insecta
- Order: Coleoptera
- Suborder: Adephaga
- Family: Carabidae
- Genus: Agonum
- Species: A. acuticolle

Binomial name
- Agonum acuticolle Motschulsky, 1864

Species of beetle

Agonum acuticolle is a species of beetle in the family Carabidae.
