= Agonum limbatum =

Scientific classification
- Kingdom: Animalia
- Phylum: Arthropoda
- Class: Insecta
- Order: Coleoptera
- Suborder: Adephaga
- Family: Carabidae
- Genus: Agonum
- Species: A. limbatum

Binomial name
- Agonum limbatum Motschulsky, 1845

Synonyms
- Agonum variolatum LeConte, 1851

Species of beetle

Agonum limbatum is a species of ground beetle in the family Carabidae. It is found in North America.
