= Agonum extensicolle =

Scientific classification
- Kingdom: Animalia
- Phylum: Arthropoda
- Clade: Pancrustacea
- Class: Insecta
- Order: Coleoptera
- Suborder: Adephaga
- Family: Carabidae
- Genus: Agonum
- Species: A. extensicolle

Binomial name
- Agonum extensicolle Say, 1823

Synonyms
- Agonum proximum (T.W.Harris, 1828); Agonum obscuratum (Chaudoir, 1843); Agonum lecontei (Leconte, 1844); Agonum viride (Leconte, 1848); Agonum cyanescens (Motschulsky, 1859); Agonum clientulus (Casey, 1920); Agonum gaudens (Casey, 1920); Agonum vigilans (Casey, 1920)

Species of beetle

Agonum extensicolle is a species of ground beetle from Platyninae subfamily that can be found in Arizona, United States and Canada.
