= Agonum gratiosum =

Scientific classification
- Domain: Eukaryota
- Kingdom: Animalia
- Phylum: Arthropoda
- Class: Insecta
- Order: Coleoptera
- Suborder: Adephaga
- Family: Carabidae
- Genus: Agonum
- Species: A. gratiosum

Binomial name
- Agonum gratiosum (Mannerheim, 1853)

Synonyms
- Agonum ruficorne (Leconte, 1850) [nec Degeer, 1774]; Agonum properans (Casey, 1920); Agonum symmetricum (Casey, 1920); Agonum antiquum (Notman, 1922); Agonum carri (Casey, 1924)

Species of beetle

Agonum gratiosum is a species of ground beetle in the Platyninae subfamily. It is found in Chukotka region, Russia and Kamchatka, and also in Alaska, United States.
