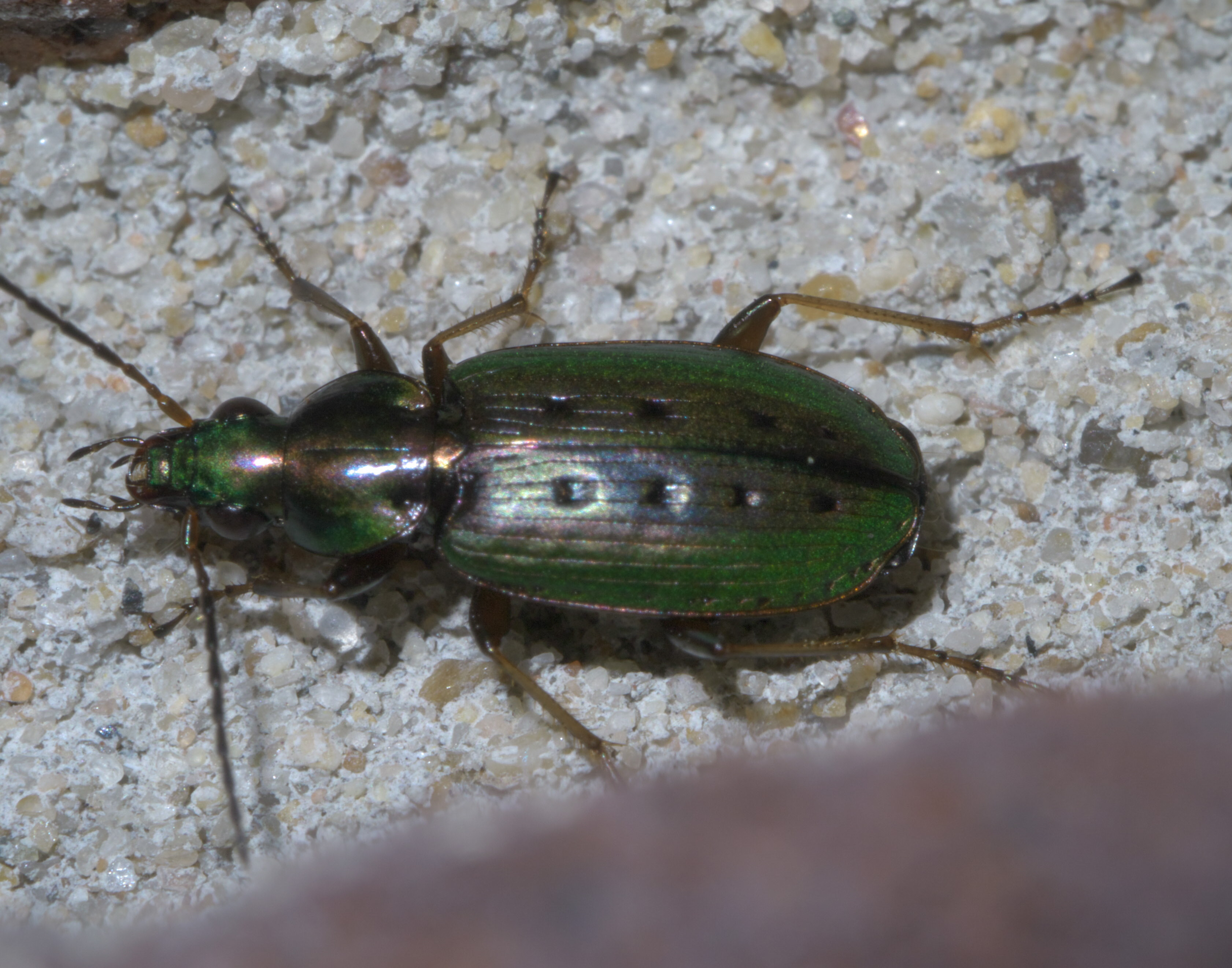

Scientific classification
- Domain: Eukaryota
- Kingdom: Animalia
- Phylum: Arthropoda
- Class: Insecta
- Order: Coleoptera
- Suborder: Adephaga
- Family: Carabidae
- Genus: Agonum
- Species: A. octopunctatum

Binomial name
- Agonum octopunctatum (Fabricius, 1798)

= Agonum octopunctatum =

Species of beetle

Agonum octopunctatum is a species of ground beetle in the subfamily Harpalinae. It is found in North America. Much of their range is between Texas and Vermont with a few being spotted on the boarder of Ontario as well.
