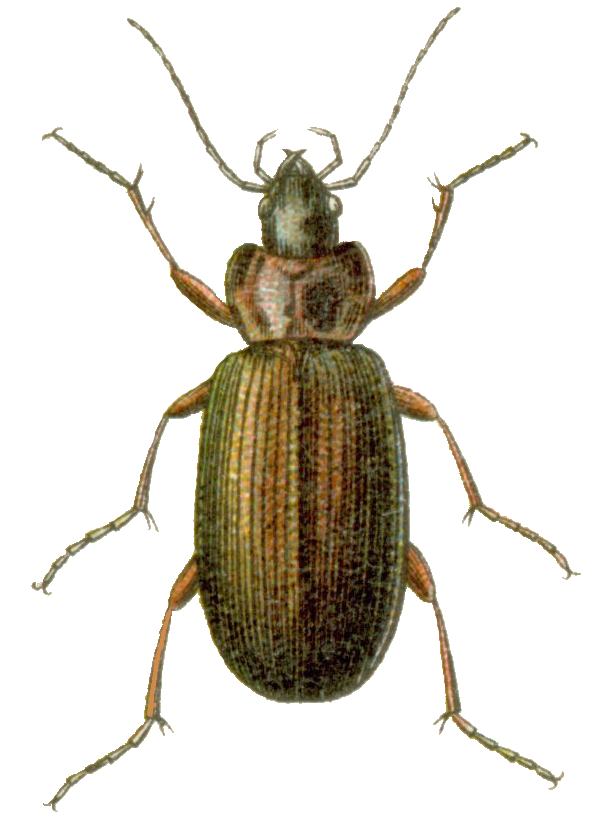

Scientific classification
- Domain: Eukaryota
- Kingdom: Animalia
- Phylum: Arthropoda
- Class: Insecta
- Order: Coleoptera
- Suborder: Adephaga
- Family: Carabidae
- Genus: Agonum
- Species: A. gracilipes

Binomial name
- Agonum gracilipes (Duftschmid, 1812)

Synonyms
- Agonum elongatum Fischer von Waldheim, 1823

= Agonum gracilipes =

Species of beetle

Agonum gracilipes is a species of ground beetle in the Platyninae subfamily. It is found everywhere in Europe except for Andorra, Monaco, Portugal, San Marino, Spain, Vatican City and various European islands.
