= Agonum chalconotum =

Scientific classification
- Domain: Eukaryota
- Kingdom: Animalia
- Phylum: Arthropoda
- Class: Insecta
- Order: Coleoptera
- Suborder: Adephaga
- Family: Carabidae
- Genus: Agonum
- Species: A. chalconotum

Binomial name
- Agonum chalconotum Ménétries, 1832

Species of beetle

Agonum chalconotum is a species of ground beetle in the Platyninae subfamily, that can be found in Great Britain, Latvia, Russia, and Near East. It is also can be found in Afghanistan, China, Turkey and all of the Central Asian republics (except for Azerbaijan).
