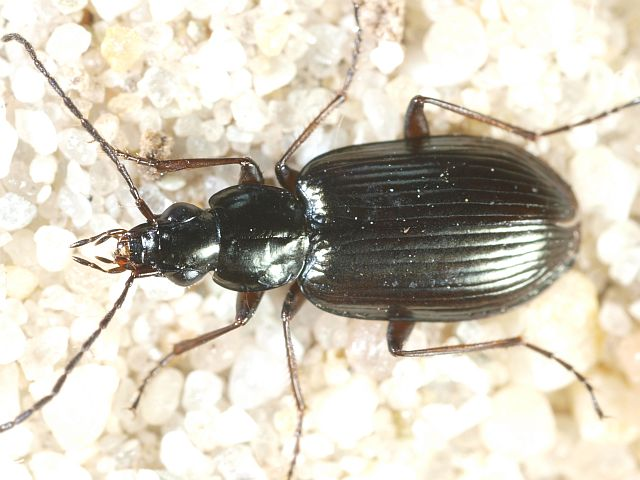

Scientific classification
- Domain: Eukaryota
- Kingdom: Animalia
- Phylum: Arthropoda
- Class: Insecta
- Order: Coleoptera
- Suborder: Adephaga
- Family: Carabidae
- Genus: Agonum
- Species: A. fuliginosum

Binomial name
- Agonum fuliginosum (Panzer, 1809)

Synonyms
- Agonum gracile Stephens, 1828

= Agonum fuliginosum =

Species of beetle

Agonum fuliginosum is a species of ground beetle in the Platyninae subfamily. It was described by Panzer in 1809 and can be found everywhere in Europe except for Albania, Andorra, Monaco, Portugal, San Marino, Vatican City and various European islands.
