= Agonum collare =

Scientific classification
- Domain: Eukaryota
- Kingdom: Animalia
- Phylum: Arthropoda
- Class: Insecta
- Order: Coleoptera
- Suborder: Adephaga
- Family: Carabidae
- Genus: Agonum
- Species: A. collare

Binomial name
- Agonum collare (Say, 1830)

Species of beetle

Agonum collare is a species of ground beetle in the family Carabidae.
