= Agonum affine =

Scientific classification
- Domain: Eukaryota
- Kingdom: Animalia
- Phylum: Arthropoda
- Class: Insecta
- Order: Coleoptera
- Suborder: Adephaga
- Family: Carabidae
- Genus: Agonum
- Species: A. affine

Binomial name
- Agonum affine Kirby, 1837

Synonyms
- Agonum carbo (LeConte, 1850)

Species of beetle

Agonum affine is a species of ground beetle in the Platyninae subfamily. It was described by William Forsell Kirby in 1837 and is endemic to the United States.
