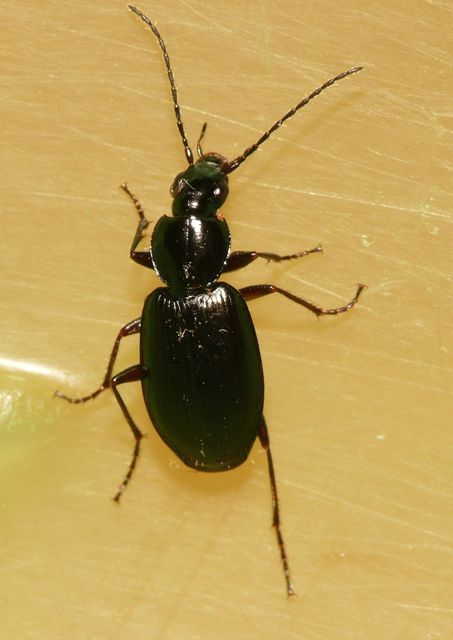

Scientific classification
- Kingdom: Animalia
- Phylum: Arthropoda
- Class: Insecta
- Order: Coleoptera
- Suborder: Adephaga
- Family: Carabidae
- Genus: Agonum
- Species: A. gracile

Binomial name
- Agonum gracile Sturm, 1824

= Agonum gracile =

Species of beetle

Agonum gracile is a species of ground beetle native to Europe.
