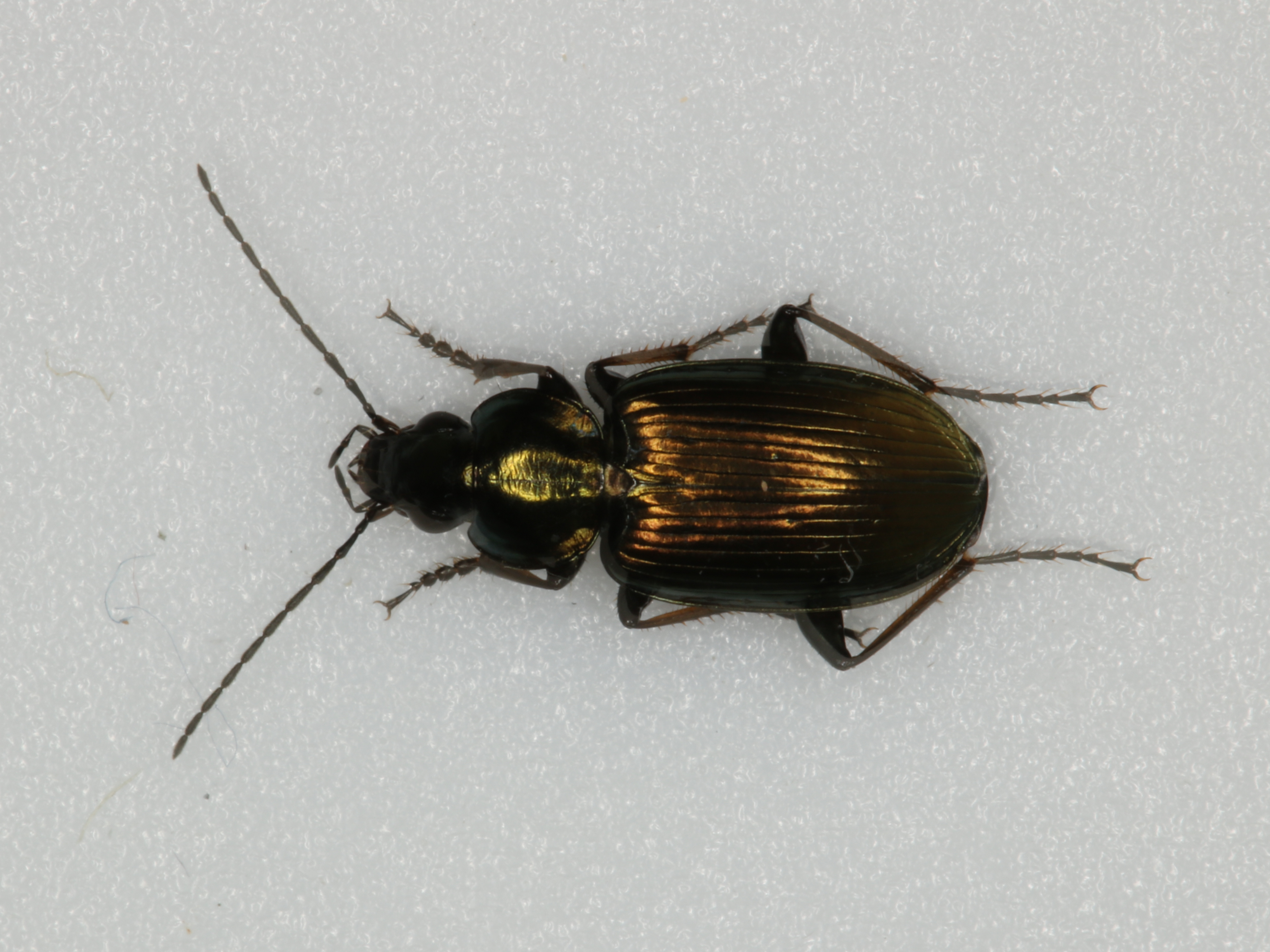
- Agonum muelleri muelleri

Scientific classification
- Kingdom: Animalia
- Phylum: Arthropoda
- Class: Insecta
- Order: Coleoptera
- Suborder: Adephaga
- Family: Carabidae
- Genus: Agonum
- Species: A. muelleri

Binomial name
- Agonum muelleri (Herbst, 1784)

= Agonum muelleri =

Species of beetle

Agonum muelleri is a species of ground beetle native to the Palearctic, the Nearctic and the Near East. In Europe, it is found in Albania, the Azores, Baltic states, Belarus, Benelux, Great Britain including the Isle of Man, Northern Ireland, mainland Portugal, Russia, Sardinia, Sicily (doubtful), mainland Spain, Ukraine, Scandinavia, Slovenia, Croatia, Serbia, Montenegro, Bosnia-Herzegovina, and North Macedonia, and Central Europe.

== Subspecies ==
- Agonum muelleri muelleri
- Agonum muelleri unicolor
