= Agonum ferruginosum =

Scientific classification
- Kingdom: Animalia
- Phylum: Arthropoda
- Clade: Pancrustacea
- Class: Insecta
- Order: Coleoptera
- Suborder: Adephaga
- Family: Carabidae
- Genus: Agonum
- Species: A. ferruginosum

Binomial name
- Agonum ferruginosum Dejean, 1828

Synonyms
- Agonum erasum (LeConte, 1879); Agonumn marcidum (Casey, 1920); Agonum wadei (Casey, 1920)

Species of beetle

Agonum ferruginosum, also known as the iron-edged harp ground beetle, is a species of ground beetle from Platyninae subfamily. It was described by Dejean in 1828. The beetle is native to the United States and Canada.
