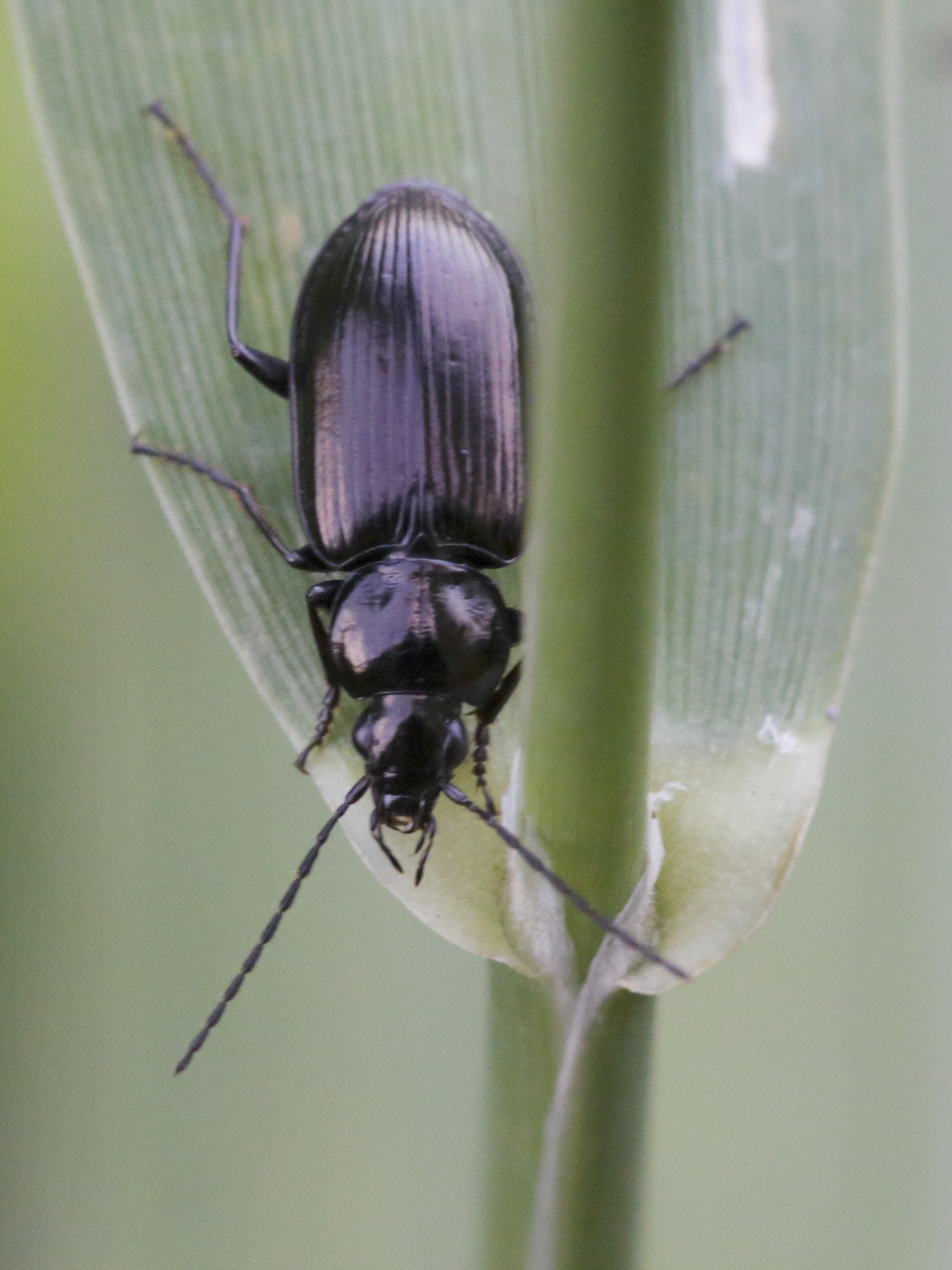

Scientific classification
- Domain: Eukaryota
- Kingdom: Animalia
- Phylum: Arthropoda
- Class: Insecta
- Order: Coleoptera
- Suborder: Adephaga
- Family: Carabidae
- Genus: Agonum
- Species: A. scitulum

Binomial name
- Agonum scitulum Dejean, 1828

= Agonum scitulum =

Species of beetle

Agonum scitulum is a species of ground beetle in the Platyninae subfamily. It is found in European countries like Belarus, Belgium, Estonia, France, Germany, Great Britain, Hungary, Ireland, Italy, Latvia, Netherlands, Romania, Russia, and Switzerland.
