= Agonum texanum =

Scientific classification
- Domain: Eukaryota
- Kingdom: Animalia
- Phylum: Arthropoda
- Class: Insecta
- Order: Coleoptera
- Suborder: Adephaga
- Family: Carabidae
- Genus: Agonum
- Species: A. texanum

Binomial name
- Agonum texanum LeConte, 1878

Synonyms
- Agonum megillum (Bates, 1891)

Species of beetle

Agonum texanum is a species of ground beetle from the Platyninae subfamily, that is endemic to Texas, United States.
