= Agonum lutulentum =

Scientific classification
- Domain: Eukaryota
- Kingdom: Animalia
- Phylum: Arthropoda
- Class: Insecta
- Order: Coleoptera
- Suborder: Adephaga
- Family: Carabidae
- Genus: Agonum
- Species: A. lutulentum

Binomial name
- Agonum lutulentum (LeConte, 1854)

Species of beetle

Agonum lutulentum, commonly known as Brown-prothorax Ground Beetle, is a species of beetle in the family Carabidae.
