= Agonum sordidum =

Scientific classification
- Kingdom: Animalia
- Phylum: Arthropoda
- Class: Insecta
- Order: Coleoptera
- Suborder: Adephaga
- Family: Carabidae
- Genus: Agonum
- Species: A. sordidum

Binomial name
- Agonum sordidum Dejean, 1828

Synonyms
- Agonum gridellii Schatzmayr 1912; Agonum kretaensis Kirschenhofer 1982

Species of beetle

Agonum sordidum is a species of ground beetle in the Platyninae subfamily. It is found in European countries like the former Yugoslavian states of Croatia and Slovenia, and the former Soviet Union state of Ukraine. It can be found in countries like Albania, and on islands such as Crete and Dodecanese. Belgium, Greece, and Italy, are also common distribution places for the species. Also it is widely distributed in Asia, in countries like Lebanon, Syria, and Turkey.
