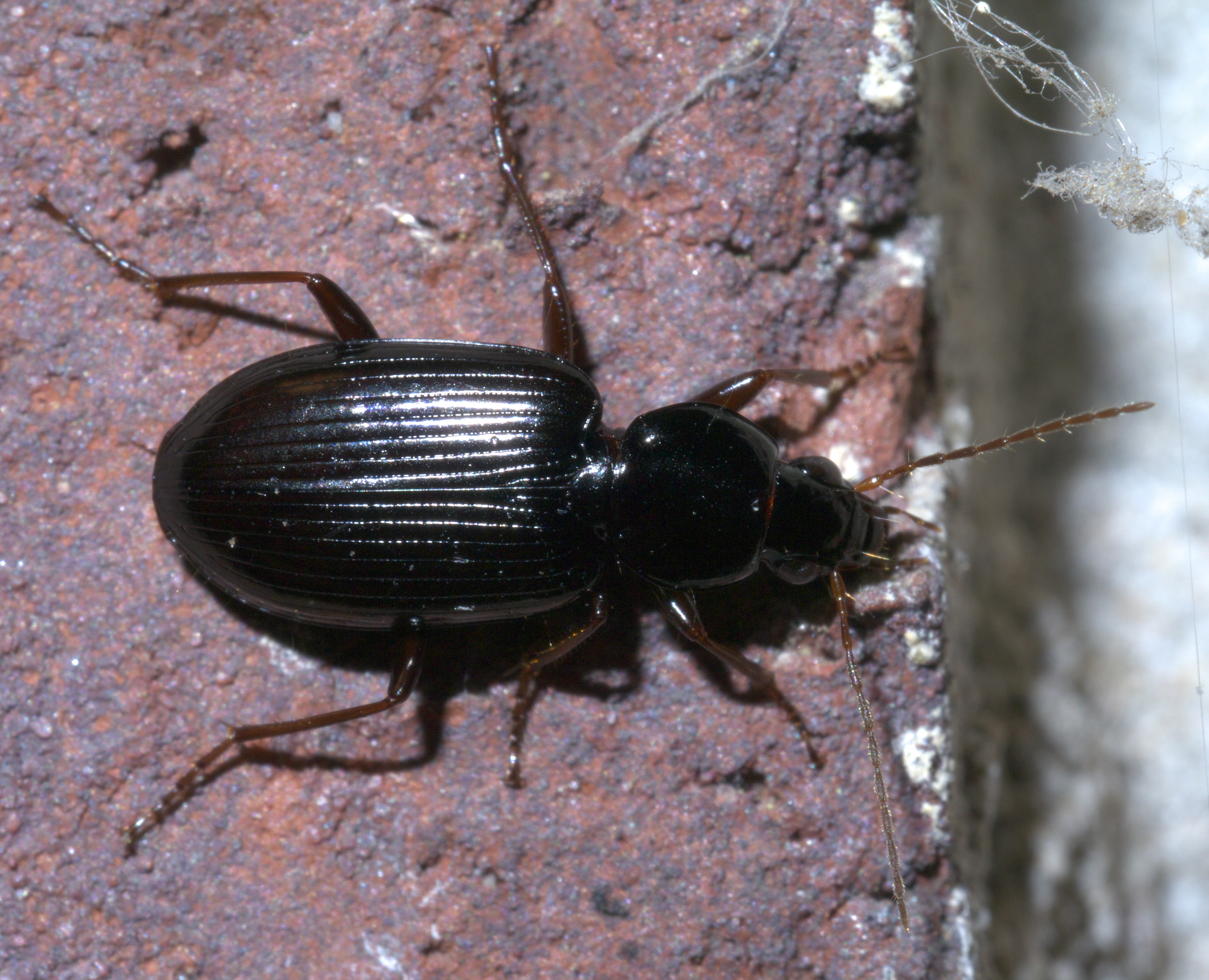

Scientific classification
- Kingdom: Animalia
- Phylum: Arthropoda
- Class: Insecta
- Order: Coleoptera
- Suborder: Adephaga
- Family: Carabidae
- Genus: Agonum
- Species: A. punctiforme

Binomial name
- Agonum punctiforme (Say, 1823)

= Agonum punctiforme =

Species of beetle

Agonum punctiforme is a North American species of ground beetle in the family Carabidae.

== Geographical range ==
A. punctiforme is found in throughout North America. More specifically, from California to Florida to Ontario to Colorado. It is also present in Mexico and the Bahamas.

== Description ==
A. punctiforme is between 8.0 and 8.25 mm in length. Body is black and legs a dark red. Elytra striated. 11 antennomeres.

== Biology ==
A. punctiforme can be found year-round in its adult form. They prefer moist areas and frequent puddles and forests and meadows after a rain. They are nocturnal beetles. They are generally predacious.

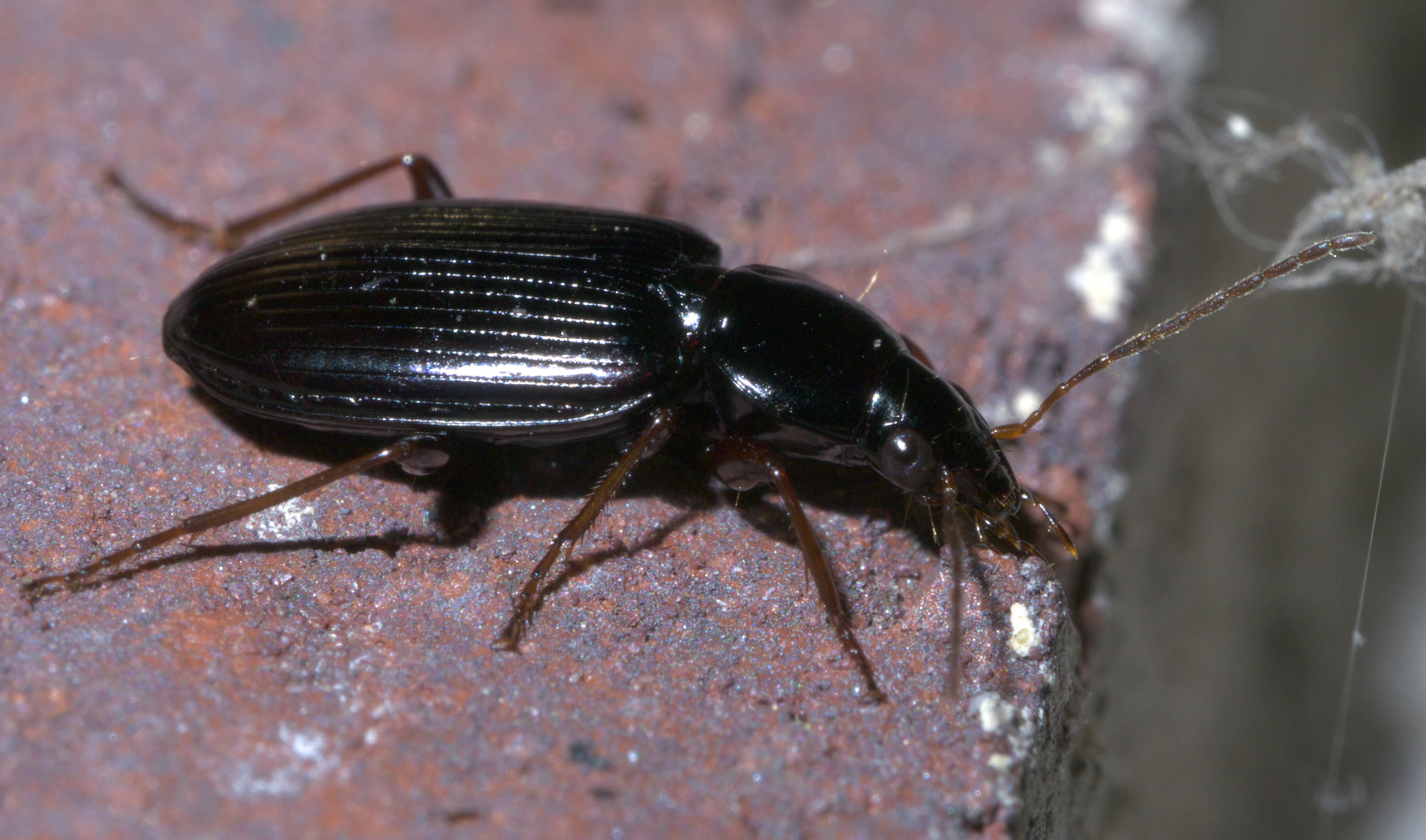
