= Agonum canadense =

Scientific classification
- Kingdom: Animalia
- Phylum: Arthropoda
- Clade: Pancrustacea
- Class: Insecta
- Order: Coleoptera
- Suborder: Adephaga
- Family: Carabidae
- Genus: Agonum
- Species: A. canadense

Binomial name
- Agonum canadense Goulet, 1969

Species of beetle

Agonum canadense is a species of ground beetle in the Platyninae subfamily that can be found in Ontario, Canada and Pennsylvania, United States.
