= Agonum permoestum =

Scientific classification
- Domain: Eukaryota
- Kingdom: Animalia
- Phylum: Arthropoda
- Class: Insecta
- Order: Coleoptera
- Suborder: Adephaga
- Family: Carabidae
- Genus: Agonum
- Species: A. permoestum

Binomial name
- Agonum permoestum Puel, 1938

Synonyms
- Agonum longipenne Mannerheim, in Chaudoir, 1844

Species of beetle

Agonum permoestum is a species of ground beetle in the Platyninae subfamily that can be found in Bosnia and Herzegovina, Bulgaria, Croatia, France, Hungary, Italy, Portugal, Romania, Slovakia, Spain, Ukraine, Germany, and Greece. It is also common on European islands such as Balearic, Crete, Corsica, Malta, Sardinia, and Sicily.
