= Agonum exaratum =

Scientific classification
- Domain: Eukaryota
- Kingdom: Animalia
- Phylum: Arthropoda
- Class: Insecta
- Order: Coleoptera
- Suborder: Adephaga
- Family: Carabidae
- Genus: Agonum
- Species: A. exaratum

Binomial name
- Agonum exaratum Mannerheim, 1853

Synonyms
- Agonum aldanicum Poppius, 1906

Species of beetle

Agonum exaratum is a species of beetle in the Platyninae subfamily that can be found in the United States and Russia.
