= Agonum excavatum =

Scientific classification
- Kingdom: Animalia
- Phylum: Arthropoda
- Class: Insecta
- Order: Coleoptera
- Suborder: Adephaga
- Family: Carabidae
- Genus: Agonum
- Species: A. excavatum

Binomial name
- Agonum excavatum Dejean, 1828

Synonyms
- Agonum ontarionis (Casey, 1920); Agonum trinarium (Casey, 1920)

Species of beetle

Agonum excavatum is a species of ground beetle from Platyninae subfamily that can be found in Suffolk County, Massachusetts, United States.
