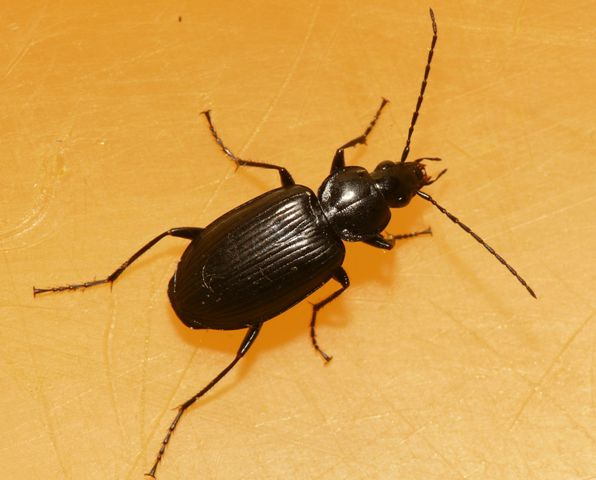

Scientific classification
- Kingdom: Animalia
- Phylum: Arthropoda
- Clade: Pancrustacea
- Class: Insecta
- Order: Coleoptera
- Suborder: Adephaga
- Family: Carabidae
- Genus: Agonum
- Species: A. viduum

Binomial name
- Agonum viduum Panzer, 1796

Synonyms
- Agonum abnormicolle Puel, 1938; Agonum limbicolle Puel, 1938

= Agonum viduum =

Species of beetle

Agonum viduum is a species of ground beetle in the Platyninae subfamily. It is found in all Eastern European countries, except for Andorra, Monaco, San Marino, Vatican City and various European islands. It can also be found in Kazakhstan, of Central Asia.
