= Agonum cyclifer =

Scientific classification
- Kingdom: Animalia
- Phylum: Arthropoda
- Class: Insecta
- Order: Coleoptera
- Suborder: Adephaga
- Family: Carabidae
- Genus: Agonum
- Species: A. cyclifer

Binomial name
- Agonum cyclifer (Bates, 1884)

Synonyms
- Anchomenus cyclifer Bates, 1884; Platynus arizonensis Horn, 1892; Agonum arizonensis (Horn, 1892)

Species of beetle

Agonum cyclifer is a species of ground beetles in the family Carabidae. It is found in Mexico and southwestern United States.
