= Agonum anchomenoides =

Scientific classification
- Domain: Eukaryota
- Kingdom: Animalia
- Phylum: Arthropoda
- Class: Insecta
- Order: Coleoptera
- Suborder: Adephaga
- Family: Carabidae
- Genus: Agonum
- Species: A. anchomenoides

Binomial name
- Agonum anchomenoides J.W. Randall, 1838

Species of beetle

Agonum anchomenoides is a species of ground beetle in the Platyninae subfamily, that lives in Canada and the United States.
