= Agonum carbonarium =

Scientific classification
- Kingdom: Animalia
- Phylum: Arthropoda
- Class: Insecta
- Order: Coleoptera
- Suborder: Adephaga
- Family: Carabidae
- Genus: Agonum
- Species: A. carbonarium

Binomial name
- Agonum carbonarium Dejean, 1828

Species of beetle

Agonum carbonarium is a species of ground beetle in the Platyninae subfamily that can be found in Albania, France, Greece, Italy, Portugal, Spain, Switzerland, and Near East. The species can also be found in Armenia and Turkey.
