= Agonum suturale =

Conservation status
- Unranked (NatureServe)

Scientific classification
- Domain: Eukaryota
- Kingdom: Animalia
- Phylum: Arthropoda
- Class: Insecta
- Order: Coleoptera
- Suborder: Adephaga
- Family: Carabidae
- Genus: Agonum
- Species: A. suturale

Binomial name
- Agonum suturale Say, 1830

Species of beetle

Agonum suturale, also known as sutured harp ground beetle, is a species of ground beetle in the subfamily Platyninae. It occurs in the western half of North America in Canada, the United States, and Mexico.

== Description ==
The species is metallic green, blue-green, or bronze coloured; the elytral margins are green. It measures 8.5–11 millimetres (0.33–0.43 in) in length.
