= Agonum superioris =

Scientific classification
- Domain: Eukaryota
- Kingdom: Animalia
- Phylum: Arthropoda
- Class: Insecta
- Order: Coleoptera
- Suborder: Adephaga
- Family: Carabidae
- Genus: Agonum
- Species: A. superioris

Binomial name
- Agonum superioris Lindroth, 1966

Species of beetle

Agonum superioris is a species of ground beetle from the Platyninae subfamily that can be found in the United States.
