= Agonum piceolum =

Scientific classification
- Kingdom: Animalia
- Phylum: Arthropoda
- Class: Insecta
- Order: Coleoptera
- Suborder: Adephaga
- Family: Carabidae
- Genus: Agonum
- Species: A. piceolum

Binomial name
- Agonum piceolum (LeConte, 1879)

Synonyms
- Agonum dissensum (Casey, 1920); Agonum frigidulum (Casey, 1920); Anchomenus frigidulus Casey, 1920

Species of beetle

Agonum piceolum is a species of ground beetle in the family Carabidae. It is found in North America.
