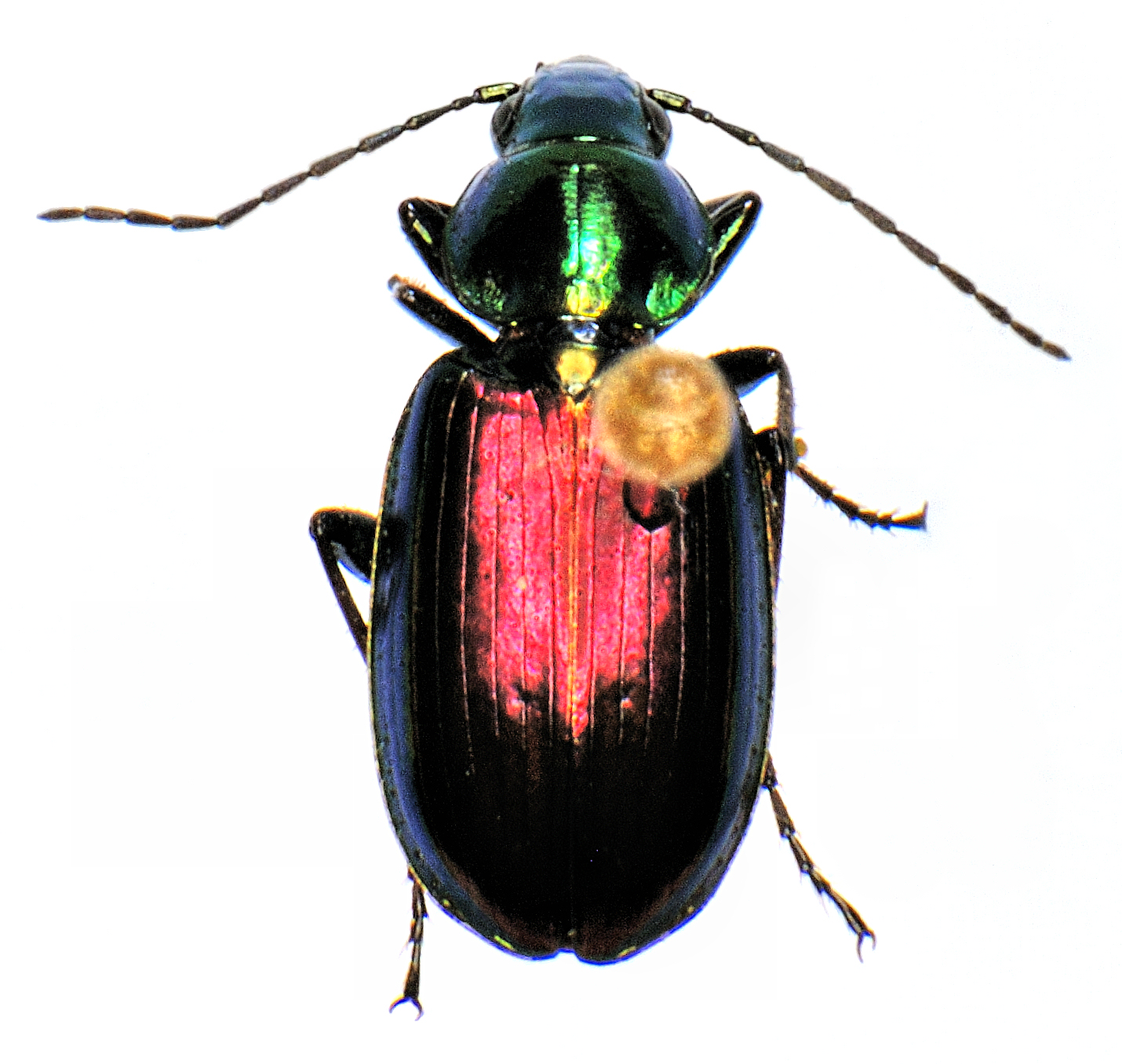

Scientific classification
- Kingdom: Animalia
- Phylum: Arthropoda
- Class: Insecta
- Order: Coleoptera
- Suborder: Adephaga
- Family: Carabidae
- Genus: Agonum
- Species: A. cupripenne

Binomial name
- Agonum cupripenne Say, 1823

Synonyms
- Agonum nitidulum (Dejean, 1828); Agonum gemmeum (Casey, 1920); Agonum tahonse (Casey, 1920)

= Agonum cupripenne =

Species of beetle

Agonum cupripenne is a species of ground beetle in the family Platyninae that is found in the United States and Canada. It is green coloured and has a purple head.
