= Agonum cupreum =

Scientific classification
- Kingdom: Animalia
- Phylum: Arthropoda
- Class: Insecta
- Order: Coleoptera
- Suborder: Adephaga
- Family: Carabidae
- Genus: Agonum
- Species: A. cupreum

Binomial name
- Agonum cupreum Dejean, 1828

Synonyms
- Agonum seminitidum (Kirby, 1837); Agonum chalceum (LeConte, 1848); Agonum protractum (LeConte, 1854); Agonum crassicolle (LeConte, 1860); Agonum borealinum (Casey, 1920); Agonum esuriale (Casey, 1920); Agonum longulum (Casey, 1920); Agonum marquettense (Casey, 1920); Agonum ovalicauda (Casey, 1920); Agonum parallelum (Casey, 1920); Agonum cupreolucens (Casey, 1924); Agonum uintanum (Casey, 1924)

Species of beetle

Agonum cupreum is a species of ground beetle from the subfamily Platyninae. It was described by Dejean in 1828 and is found in Duluth, Minnesota and Canada.
