= Agonum anthracinum =

Scientific classification
- Kingdom: Animalia
- Phylum: Arthropoda
- Class: Insecta
- Order: Coleoptera
- Suborder: Adephaga
- Family: Carabidae
- Genus: Agonum
- Species: A. anthracinum

Binomial name
- Agonum anthracinum Dejean, 1831

Species of beetle

Agonum anthracinum is a species of ground beetle from a subfamily of Platyninae. It was described by Dejean in 1831 and is found in Mexico and the United States.
