= Agonum duftschmidi =

Scientific classification
- Domain: Eukaryota
- Kingdom: Animalia
- Phylum: Arthropoda
- Class: Insecta
- Order: Coleoptera
- Suborder: Adephaga
- Family: Carabidae
- Genus: Agonum
- Species: A. duftschmidi

Binomial name
- Agonum duftschmidi J. Schmidt, 1994

Synonyms
- Agonum moestum (Duftschmid, 1812)

Species of beetle

Agonum duftschmidi is a species of beetle from family Carabidae, found in all European countries except for Andorra, Iceland, Malta, Monaco, Portugal, and Vatican City.
