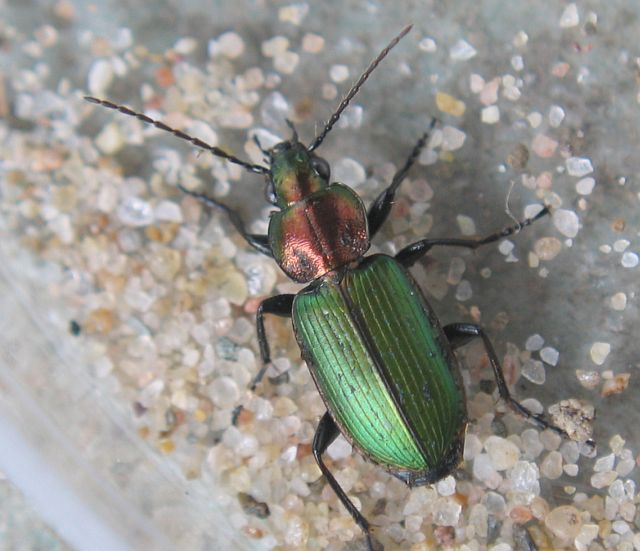

Scientific classification
- Kingdom: Animalia
- Phylum: Arthropoda
- Clade: Pancrustacea
- Class: Insecta
- Order: Coleoptera
- Suborder: Adephaga
- Family: Carabidae
- Genus: Agonum
- Species: A. viridicupreum

Binomial name
- Agonum viridicupreum Goeze, 1777

= Agonum viridicupreum =

Species of beetle

Agonum viridicupreum is a species of ground beetle in the Platyninae subfamily. It is found in European countries except in Belarus and Lithuania. It can also be found in Central Asian countries like Kazakhstan and Uzbekistan. It also widely distributed in Afghanistan, Iraq, and Turkey.
