= Agonum melanarium =

Scientific classification
- Domain: Eukaryota
- Kingdom: Animalia
- Phylum: Arthropoda
- Class: Insecta
- Order: Coleoptera
- Suborder: Adephaga
- Family: Carabidae
- Genus: Agonum
- Species: A. melanarium

Binomial name
- Agonum melanarium Dejean, 1828

Species of insect

Agonum melanarium is a species of ground beetle in the family Carabidae. It is found in North America.
