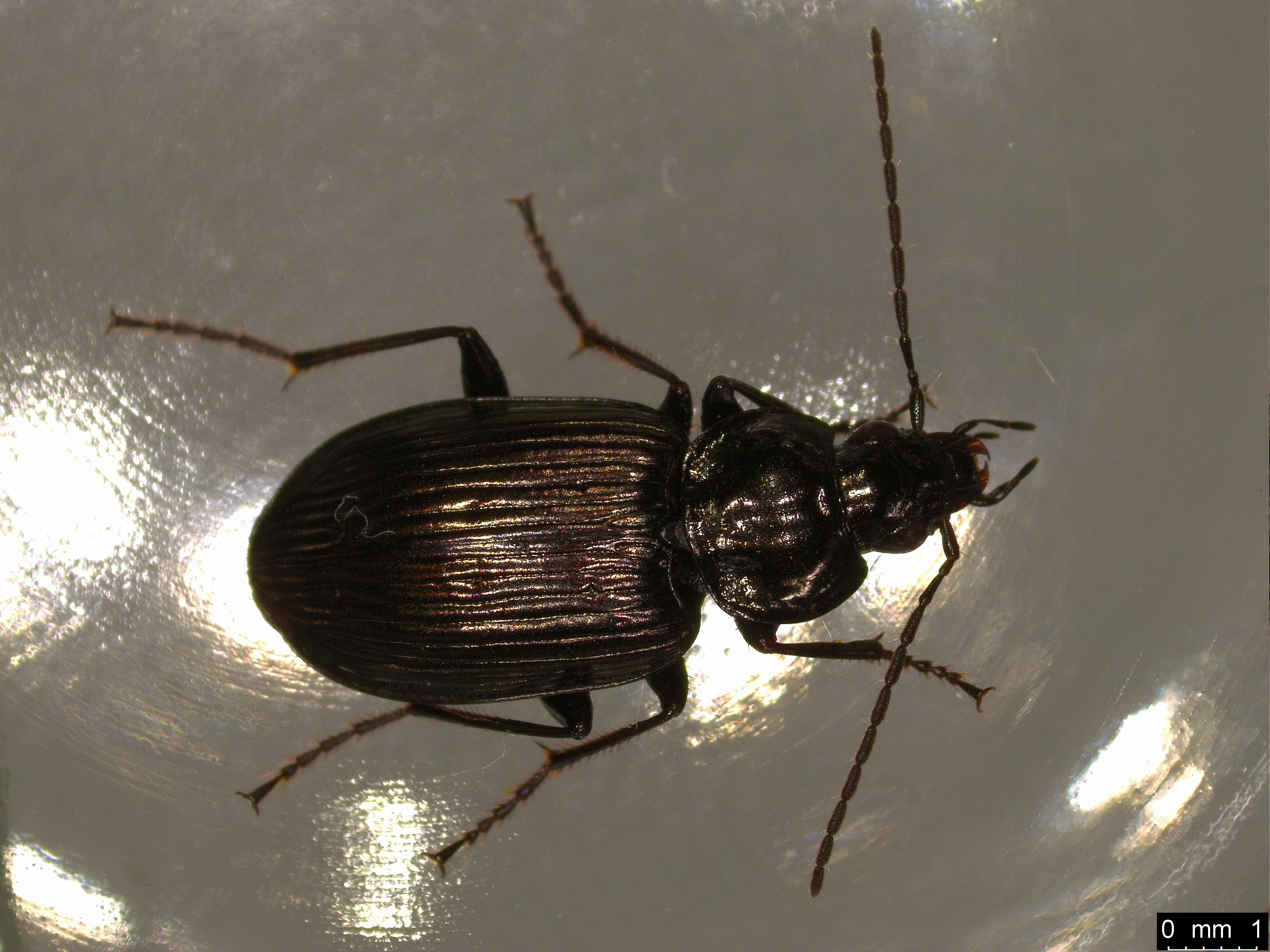

Scientific classification
- Kingdom: Animalia
- Phylum: Arthropoda
- Class: Insecta
- Order: Coleoptera
- Suborder: Adephaga
- Family: Carabidae
- Genus: Agonum
- Species: A. emarginatum

Binomial name
- Agonum emarginatum Gyllenhal, 1827

Synonyms
- Agonum afrum (Duftschmid, 1812)

= Agonum emarginatum =

Species of beetle

Agonum emarginatum is a species of ground beetle from Platyninae subfamily, that can be found in all European countries except for Andorra, Iceland, Liechtenstein, Malta, Monaco, Portugal, and Vatican City.
