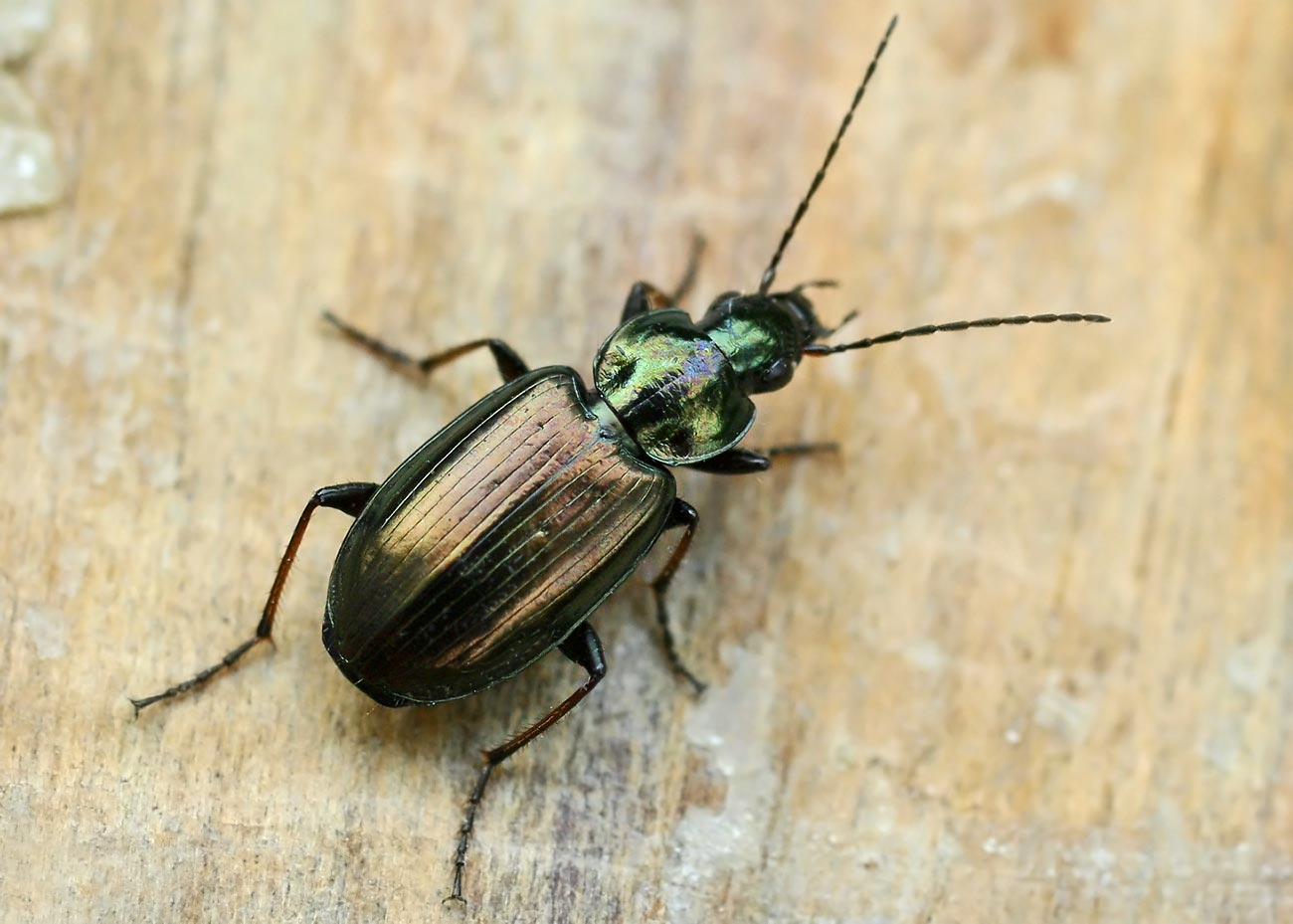

Scientific classification
- Kingdom: Animalia
- Phylum: Arthropoda
- Class: Insecta
- Order: Coleoptera
- Suborder: Adephaga
- Family: Carabidae
- Genus: Agonum
- Species: A. sexpunctatum

Binomial name
- Agonum sexpunctatum (Linnaeus, 1758)

Synonyms
- Carabus sexpunctatum Linne, 1758; Platynus mattosoi Paulino d'Oliveira, 1882

= Agonum sexpunctatum =

Species of beetle

Agonum sexpunctatum is a wet-loving, peatland species of ground beetle native to the Palearctic and the Near East.

In Europe, it is found in Albania, Belarus, Benelux, the Baltic states, Finland, France, Italy, Liechtenstein, Portugal, Russia, Scandinavia, Spain, Ukraine, the former Yugoslavian states and Central Europe. It is absent in Ireland.
