= Agonum antennarium =

Scientific classification
- Domain: Eukaryota
- Kingdom: Animalia
- Phylum: Arthropoda
- Class: Insecta
- Order: Coleoptera
- Suborder: Adephaga
- Family: Carabidae
- Genus: Agonum
- Species: A. antennarium

Binomial name
- Agonum antennarium (Duftschmid, 1812)

Synonyms
- Agonum pirata Schatzmayr, 1909; Europhilus antennarius (Duftschmid, 1812)

Species of beetle

Agonum antennarium is a species of ground beetle in the Platyninae subfamily, that can be found in Albania, Austria, Bulgaria, Czech Republic, France, Germany, Greece, Hungary, Italy, Moldova, Poland, Romania, Slovakia, Switzerland, Ukraine, and all the republics of the former Yugoslavia (except for Croatia).
