= Agonum cyanopis =

Scientific classification
- Domain: Eukaryota
- Kingdom: Animalia
- Phylum: Arthropoda
- Class: Insecta
- Order: Coleoptera
- Suborder: Adephaga
- Family: Carabidae
- Genus: Agonum
- Species: A. cyanopis

Binomial name
- Agonum cyanopis (Bates, 1882)

Species of beetle

Agonum cyanopis is a species of ground beetle in the family Carabidae. It is found in Central America and North America.
