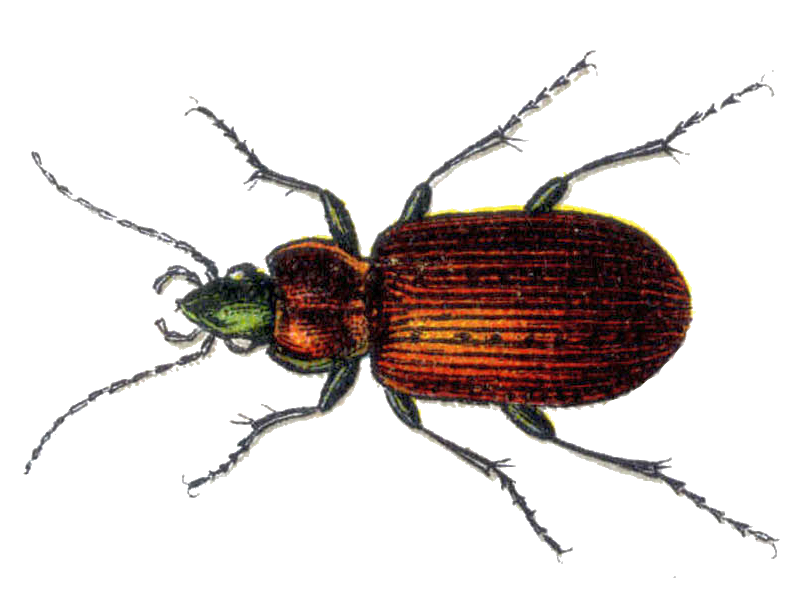

Scientific classification
- Kingdom: Animalia
- Phylum: Arthropoda
- Clade: Pancrustacea
- Class: Insecta
- Order: Coleoptera
- Suborder: Adephaga
- Superfamily: Caraboidea
- Family: Carabidae
- Subfamily: Platyninae
- Tribe: Platynini
- Genus: Agonum
- Species: A. impressum

Binomial name
- Agonum impressum (Panzer, 1796)

= Agonum impressum =

Species of beetle

Agonum impressum is a species of ground beetles in the subfamily Platyninae.

== Description ==
Beetle length is from 8–9.5 millimetres (0.31–0.37 in). The upper part of the body is of copper, bronze, or green colour. Rarely, the species have two-tone colour. The elytron have five to seven very large, and bright gaps.

== Ecology ==
The species live mostly near the water. It is found in several locations throughout Europe and Asia, including in the Mordovia region.
