= Agonum humerosum =

Scientific classification
- Kingdom: Animalia
- Phylum: Arthropoda
- Clade: Pancrustacea
- Class: Insecta
- Order: Coleoptera
- Suborder: Adephaga
- Family: Carabidae
- Subfamily: Platyninae
- Tribe: Platynini
- Genus: Agonum
- Species: A. humerosum

Binomial name
- Agonum humerosum (Semenov, 1889)

Synonyms
- Agonops humerosus (Semenov, 1889); Agonopsis humerosus (Semenov, 1889); Anchomenus humerosus Semenov, 1889

Genus of beetles

Agonum humerosum is a species in the beetle family Carabidae. It is found in China.

This species was formerly the sole species of the genus Agonops.

== Subspecies ==
These two subspecies belong to the species Agonum humerosum:

- Agonum humerosum amicorum J.Schmidt & Liebherr, 2006 (China)
- Agonum humerosum humerosum (Semenov, 1889) (China)
