= Agonum harrisii =

Scientific classification
- Kingdom: Animalia
- Phylum: Arthropoda
- Clade: Pancrustacea
- Class: Insecta
- Order: Coleoptera
- Suborder: Adephaga
- Family: Carabidae
- Genus: Agonum
- Species: A. harrisii

Binomial name
- Agonum harrisii LeConte, 1846

Species of beetle

Agonum harrisii is a species of beetle in the family Carabidae. It is found in Winthrop Harbor, Illinois, United States.
