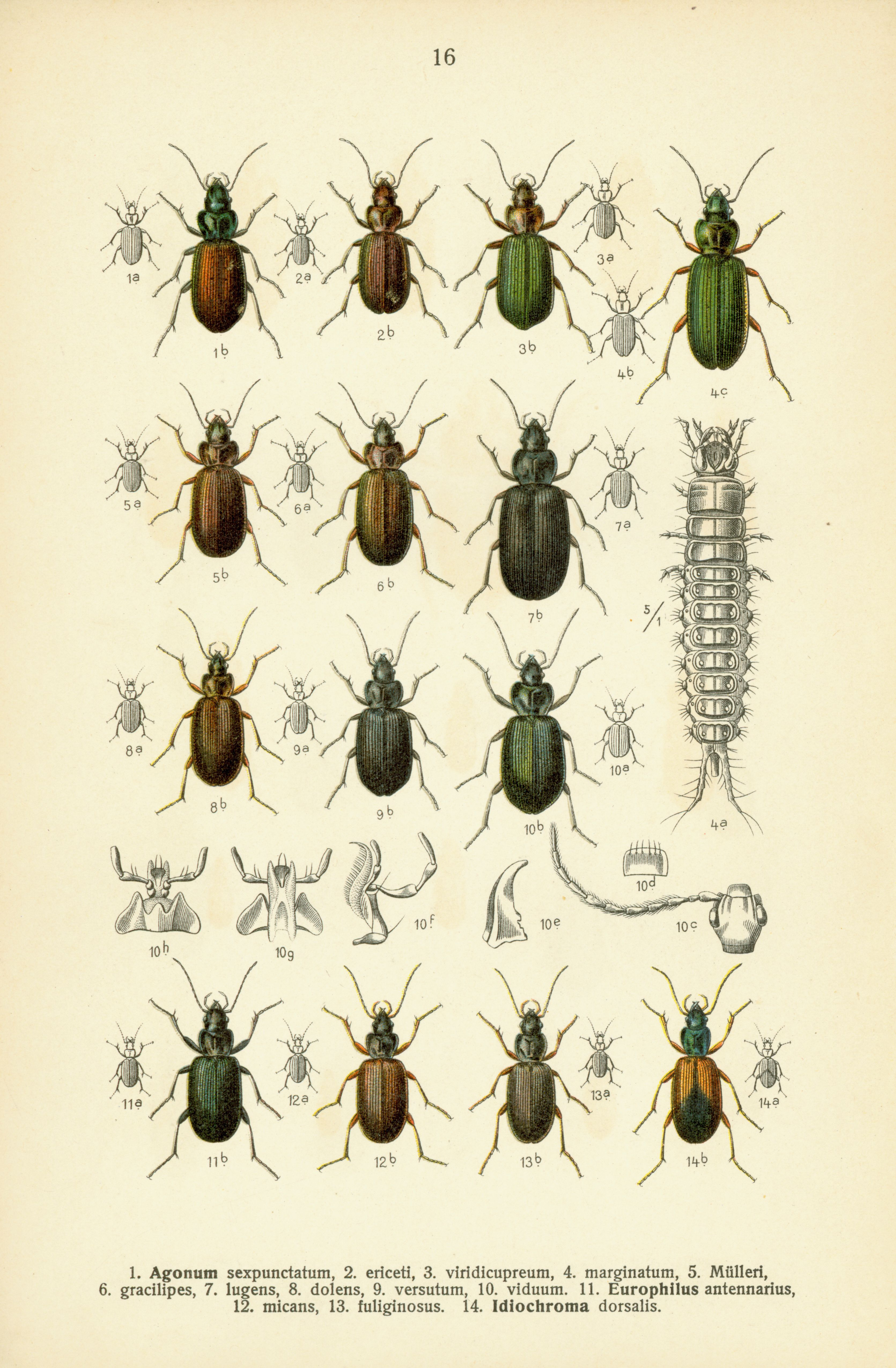

Scientific classification
- Kingdom: Animalia
- Phylum: Arthropoda
- Class: Insecta
- Order: Coleoptera
- Suborder: Adephaga
- Family: Carabidae
- Genus: Agonum
- Species: A. micans

Binomial name
- Agonum micans Nicolai, 1822

= Agonum micans =

Species of beetle

Agonum micans is a species of ground beetle native to Europe.
