= Agonum fidele =

Scientific classification
- Kingdom: Animalia
- Phylum: Arthropoda
- Class: Insecta
- Order: Coleoptera
- Suborder: Adephaga
- Family: Carabidae
- Genus: Agonum
- Species: A. fidele

Binomial name
- Agonum fidele Casey, 1820

Species of beetle

Agonum fidele is a species of ground beetle from Platyninae subfamily that can be found in United States and Canada.
