= Agonum gisellae =

Scientific classification
- Kingdom: Animalia
- Phylum: Arthropoda
- Clade: Pancrustacea
- Class: Insecta
- Order: Coleoptera
- Suborder: Adephaga
- Family: Carabidae
- Subfamily: Platyninae
- Tribe: Platynini
- Genus: Agonum
- Species: A. gisellae

Binomial name
- Agonum gisellae Csiki, 1931

Synonyms
- Agonum angustatum Dejean, 1828

Species of beetle

Agonum gisellae is a species in the beetle family Carabidae. It is found in the Palearctic.
