= Agonum bicolor =

Scientific classification
- Kingdom: Animalia
- Phylum: Arthropoda
- Class: Insecta
- Order: Coleoptera
- Suborder: Adephaga
- Family: Carabidae
- Genus: Agonum
- Species: A. bicolor

Binomial name
- Agonum bicolor (Dejean, 1828)

Synonyms
- Anchomenus bicolor Dejean, 1828; Agonum alpinum Motschulsky, 1844; Agonum jemelianovi Lafer, 1992; Agonum sibiricum Gebler, 1847

Species of beetle

Agonum bicolor is a species of ground beetle in the Platyninae subfamily. It was described by Dejean in 1828 and is found in Japan, Kazakhstan, Mongolia and Russia. Besides those countries it can be found in the US state of Alaska, and British Columbia, Canada, where it was discovered in March 1981, on Bougie Creek. One of such species was found near Liard River in May 1981.

== Subspecies ==
- Agonum bicolor bicolor
- Agonum bicolor kitanoi Habu, 1956 (Japan)
