= Agonum palustre =

Scientific classification
- Domain: Eukaryota
- Kingdom: Animalia
- Phylum: Arthropoda
- Class: Insecta
- Order: Coleoptera
- Suborder: Adephaga
- Family: Carabidae
- Genus: Agonum
- Species: A. palustre

Binomial name
- Agonum palustre Goulet, 1969

Species of beetle

Agonum palustre is a species of ground beetle in the family Carabidae. It is found in North America.
