= Agonum nigriceps =

Scientific classification
- Domain: Eukaryota
- Kingdom: Animalia
- Phylum: Arthropoda
- Class: Insecta
- Order: Coleoptera
- Suborder: Adephaga
- Family: Carabidae
- Genus: Agonum
- Species: A. nigriceps

Binomial name
- Agonum nigriceps LeConte, 1846

Species of beetle

Agonum nigriceps is a species of ground beetle in the family Carabidae. It is found in Europe and Northern Asia (excluding China) and North America.
