= Agonum propinquum =

Scientific classification
- Domain: Eukaryota
- Kingdom: Animalia
- Phylum: Arthropoda
- Class: Insecta
- Order: Coleoptera
- Suborder: Adephaga
- Family: Carabidae
- Genus: Agonum
- Species: A. propinquum

Binomial name
- Agonum propinquum (Gemminger & Harold, 1868)

Synonyms
- Agonum xanthocneme (Bates, 1884)

Species of beetle

Agonum propinquum is a species of ground beetle in the family Carabidae. It is found in North America.
