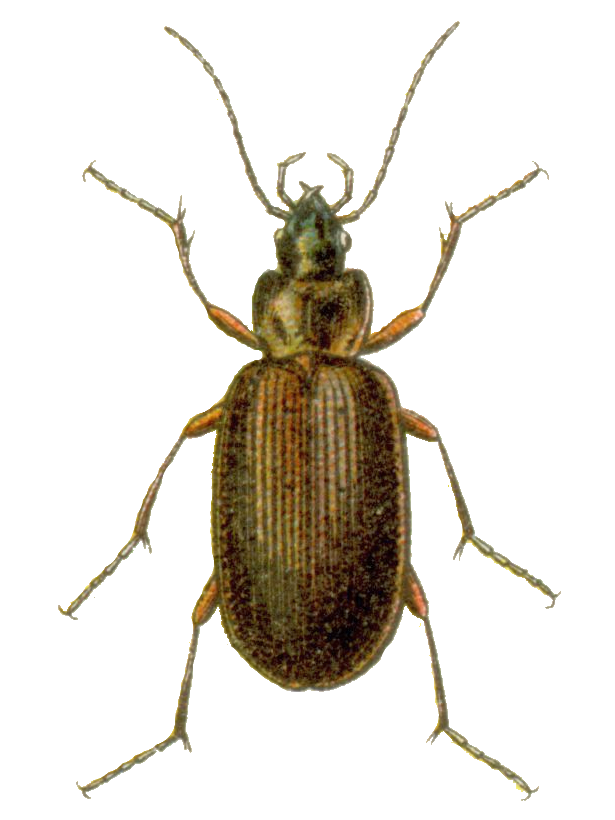

Scientific classification
- Domain: Eukaryota
- Kingdom: Animalia
- Phylum: Arthropoda
- Class: Insecta
- Order: Coleoptera
- Suborder: Adephaga
- Family: Carabidae
- Genus: Agonum
- Species: A. dolens

Binomial name
- Agonum dolens C. R. Sahlberg, 1827

= Agonum dolens =

Species of beetle

Agonum dolens is a species of ground beetle in the Platyninae subfamily. The species is common throughout Eastern Europe and Central Asia.

== Description ==
Beetle in length is from 7–8 millimetres (0.28–0.31 in). The body is bronze or bronze-black, legs are brownish-red. The third interval of elytron have three, rarely four pores. The prothorax is broad, and is transverse.

== Ecology ==
Living on shores, especially on Warta river of Poland.
