= Agonum belleri =

Conservation status
- Vulnerable (NatureServe)

Scientific classification
- Domain: Eukaryota
- Kingdom: Animalia
- Phylum: Arthropoda
- Class: Insecta
- Order: Coleoptera
- Suborder: Adephaga
- Family: Carabidae
- Genus: Agonum
- Species: A. belleri

Binomial name
- Agonum belleri (Hatch, 1933)

Synonyms
- Punctagonum elleri Gray, 1937

Species of beetle

Agonum belleri, sometimes called Beller's ground beetle, is a species of ground beetle in the Platyninae subfamily. Beller's ground beetle is found throughout wetlands in the Pacific Northwest in Oregon, Washington, and British Columbia.

Beller's ground beetle is listed as a "species of greatest conservation need" on the Washington Department of Fish and Wildlife. It has not been evaluated by the International Union of Conservation for Nature (IUCN). The Xerces Society for Invertebrate Conservation lists it as an endangered species.

== Description ==
The species are metallic-black in colour, with a copper tone. It often reflects blue or green. It is a winged beetle but lacks flight, with its elytra (wing cases) with vertical grooved stripes. The dorsal back of the beetle is covered with bristles, but this often is missed, and can usually only be seen under proper light or a hands lens.

A. belleri is a member of the Carabidae family. Carabid beetles lay eggs and undergo a complete metamorphosis. This includes egg, larvae, pupal, and adult life cycle stages. Beller's ground beetles live for many years, and it is suspected that larvae may take several years to fully develop. Females lay eggs singly in burrows shallowly made in the soil. Larvae and pupae develop underground and emerge as adults. Because of this, soil composition is incredibly important for both breeding and development.

It is believed that warmer temperatures increase the activity of Beller's ground beetle, as during warmer periods and summer months, Beller's ground beetle is found in the highest numbers.

== Distribution and habitat ==
The species can be found only in Pacific Northwest of North America. A. belleri lives in sphagnum bogs at low to medium elevation sphagnum bogs and, rarely, other wetlands and moist woods. In Washington state, they are mainly found in Puget Trough sphagnum moss. Sphagnum bogs make up only three percent of wetlands in Washington state. They also occur in the Queen Charlotte Islands and southwest British Columbia, as well as in northwest Oregon.

This species has been recorded in Mt. Hood National Forest, and is purportedly present in Baker National Forest, Olympic National Forest, and around Mt. St. Helens.

In addition to sphagnum, plant species associated with Beller's ground beetle is common cotton sedge, sundew plants, and bog cranberry. Other plants associated with the habitat of Beller's ground beetle is Labrador tea, bog rosemary, bigleaf maple, firs, western redcedars, and red alder.

The main threat to this species is habitat loss, peat-mining, and pesticide usage.

== Diet ==
Beller's ground beetle are predatory insects that mainly feed on other insects. It is assumed that they eat insects similar to that of the sundew plants in their environments. Adult beetles and larvae both eat bugs, but adults are believed to eat more plant material than larvae.

Adults hunt by sight during the day. They are fast runners that have powerful mandibles, and can easily subdue their prey.

== Taxonomy ==
The species was named after Samuel Beller, an entomologist who was one of the Melville H. Hatch's pupils.
