= Agonum ferreum =

Scientific classification
- Domain: Eukaryota
- Kingdom: Animalia
- Phylum: Arthropoda
- Class: Insecta
- Order: Coleoptera
- Suborder: Adephaga
- Family: Carabidae
- Genus: Agonum
- Species: A. ferreum

Binomial name
- Agonum ferreum Haldeman, 1843

Synonyms
- Agonum ocreatum Haldeman, 1843; Agonum quadrulum (Casey, 1920); Agonum solidulum (Casey, 1920)

Species of beetle

Agonum ferreum is a species of ground beetle from Platyninae subfamily, that can be found in the United States.
