= Agonum trigeminum =

Conservation status
- Secure (NatureServe)

Scientific classification
- Kingdom: Animalia
- Phylum: Arthropoda
- Clade: Pancrustacea
- Class: Insecta
- Order: Coleoptera
- Suborder: Adephaga
- Family: Carabidae
- Genus: Agonum
- Species: A. trigeminum

Binomial name
- Agonum trigeminum Lindroth, 1954

Species of beetle

Agonum trigeminum, also known as triple harp ground beetle, is a species of ground beetles, family Carabidae. It occurs in the eastern half of the North America in the Eastern United States and Eastern Canada.

== Description ==
Agonum trigeminum measures 8.3–10 mm (0.33–0.39 in) in length and is deep black in color.

== Ecology ==
It is associated with margins of eutrophic ponds and pools with dense vegetation.
