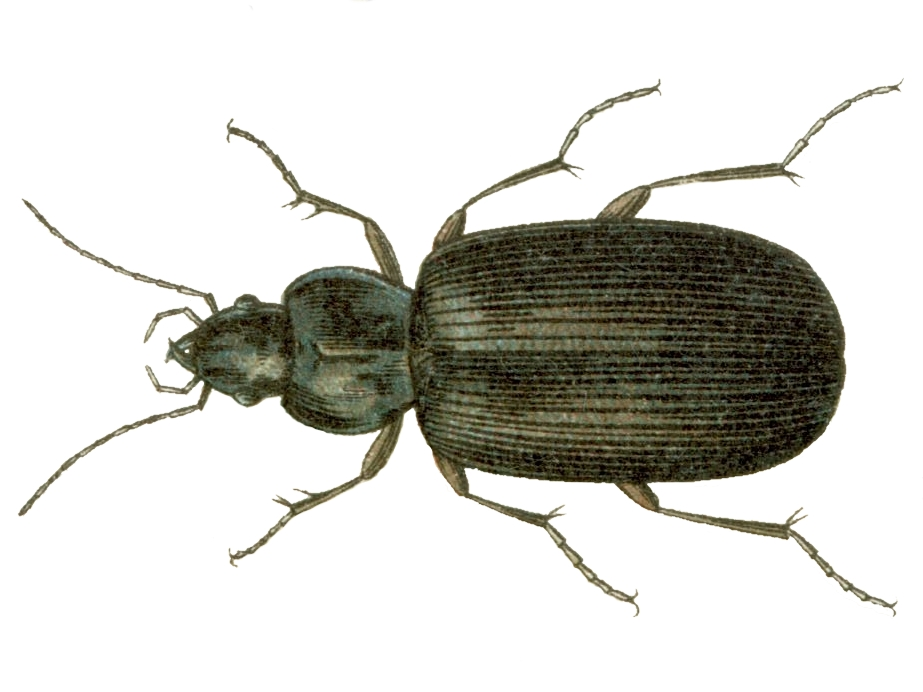

Scientific classification
- Domain: Eukaryota
- Kingdom: Animalia
- Phylum: Arthropoda
- Class: Insecta
- Order: Coleoptera
- Suborder: Adephaga
- Family: Carabidae
- Genus: Agonum
- Species: A. lugens

Binomial name
- Agonum lugens Duftschmid, 1812

= Agonum lugens =

Species of beetle

Agonum lugens is a species of ground beetle in the Platyninae subfamily. It was described by Caspar Erasmus Duftschmid in 1812.

== Description ==
Beetle in length from 8.5–10 millimetres (0.33–0.39 in). The upper body is black, male and female both have lightly shiny mat. The elytron usually have three pores, which have strongly curved main edge.

== Ecology ==
They live on wet clay soil.
