= Agonum deceptivum =

Scientific classification
- Domain: Eukaryota
- Kingdom: Animalia
- Phylum: Arthropoda
- Class: Insecta
- Order: Coleoptera
- Suborder: Adephaga
- Family: Carabidae
- Genus: Agonum
- Species: A. deceptivum

Binomial name
- Agonum deceptivum LeConte, 1879

Species of beetle

Agonum deceptivum is a species of ground beetle from Platyninae subfamily, that can be found in the United States.
