= Agonum hypocrita =

Scientific classification
- Domain: Eukaryota
- Kingdom: Animalia
- Phylum: Arthropoda
- Class: Insecta
- Order: Coleoptera
- Suborder: Adephaga
- Family: Carabidae
- Genus: Agonum
- Species: A. hypocrita

Binomial name
- Agonum hypocrita (Apfelbeck, 1904)

Synonyms
- Carabus lugubre Duftschmid, 1812; Platynus hypocrita Apfelbeck, 1904

Species of beetle

Agonum hypocrita is a species of ground beetle in the genus Agonum that was discovered in 1904. The species can be found throughout Southern, Central and Northern Europe (except for Austria, Montenegro, Iceland, Ireland, and the United Kingdom). It is also found in Spain and Turkey.
