= Agonum crenistriatum =

Scientific classification
- Domain: Eukaryota
- Kingdom: Animalia
- Phylum: Arthropoda
- Class: Insecta
- Order: Coleoptera
- Suborder: Adephaga
- Family: Carabidae
- Genus: Agonum
- Species: A. crenistriatum

Binomial name
- Agonum crenistriatum LeConte, 1863

Synonyms
- Agonum liticola (Casey, 1920); Agonum politissimum (Casey, 1920); Agonum roticolle (Casey, 1920); Agonum statenense (Casey, 1920)

Species of beetle

Agonum crenistriatum is a species of ground beetle from Platyninae subfamily. It was described by John Lawrence LeConte in 1863 and is endemic to the United States.
