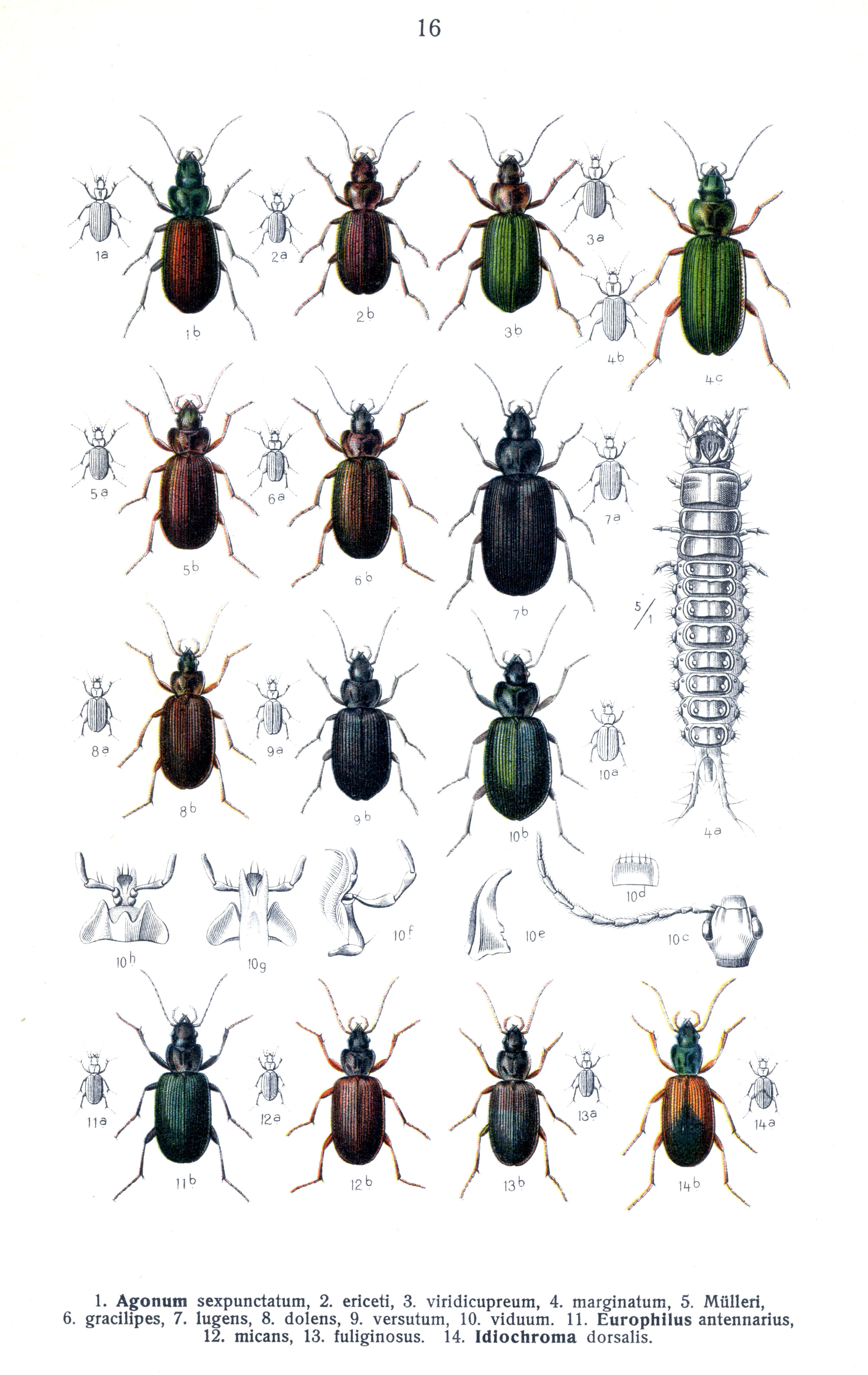

Scientific classification
- Domain: Eukaryota
- Kingdom: Animalia
- Phylum: Arthropoda
- Class: Insecta
- Order: Coleoptera
- Suborder: Adephaga
- Family: Carabidae
- Genus: Agonum
- Species: A. versutum

Binomial name
- Agonum versutum Sturm, 1824

= Agonum versutum =

Species of beetle

Agonum versutum is a species of ground beetle in the Platyninae subfamily that is found in most of Europe.

== Description ==
The upper body is black with a bronze sheen or dark bronze. Microstracture of elytron is barely visible at a magnification of 30 times, and consists of a thin cross-cells.

== Ecology ==
The species prefers the banks of ponds.
