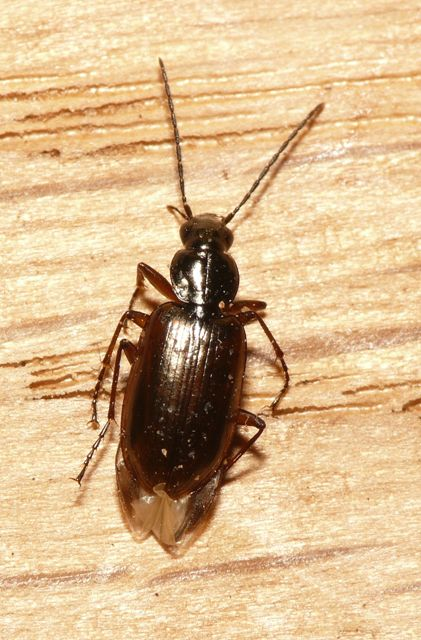

Scientific classification
- Kingdom: Animalia
- Phylum: Arthropoda
- Class: Insecta
- Order: Coleoptera
- Suborder: Adephaga
- Family: Carabidae
- Genus: Agonum
- Species: A. piceum

Binomial name
- Agonum piceum (Linnaeus, 1758)

Synonyms
- Carabus pelidnum Herbst, 1784

= Agonum piceum =

Species of beetle

Agonum piceum is a species of ground beetle in the Platyninae subfamily that can be found everywhere in Europe except for Albania, Andorra, Monaco, Portugal, San Marino, Spain, Vatican City and various European islands.
