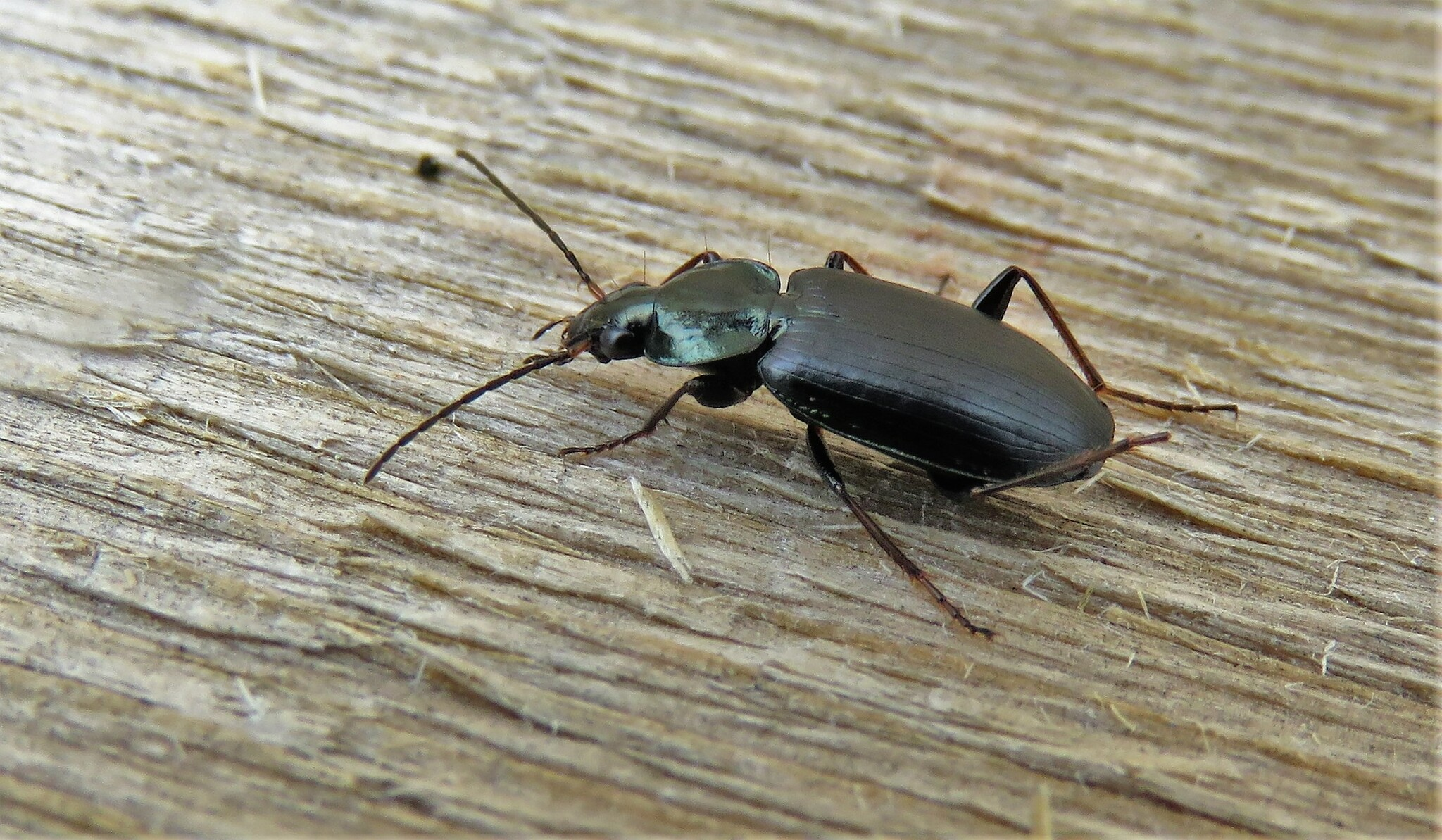
- Agonum placidum, Canada

Scientific classification
- Domain: Eukaryota
- Kingdom: Animalia
- Phylum: Arthropoda
- Class: Insecta
- Order: Coleoptera
- Suborder: Adephaga
- Family: Carabidae
- Genus: Agonum
- Species: A. placidum

Binomial name
- Agonum placidum Say, 1823

Synonyms
- Agonum morosum Dejean, 1828; Agonum alcyoneum Chaudoir, 1837; Agonum transpunctatum Bates, 1878; Agonum amplior Casey, 1920; Agonum aztecanum Casey, 1920; Agonum citatum Casey, 1920; Agonum rhodeanum Casey, 1924

= Agonum placidum =

Species of beetle

Agonum placidum is a species of black coloured ground beetle in the Platyninae subfamily that can be found in woodlands, thickets, and open fields of southern Canada and northeastern United States.
