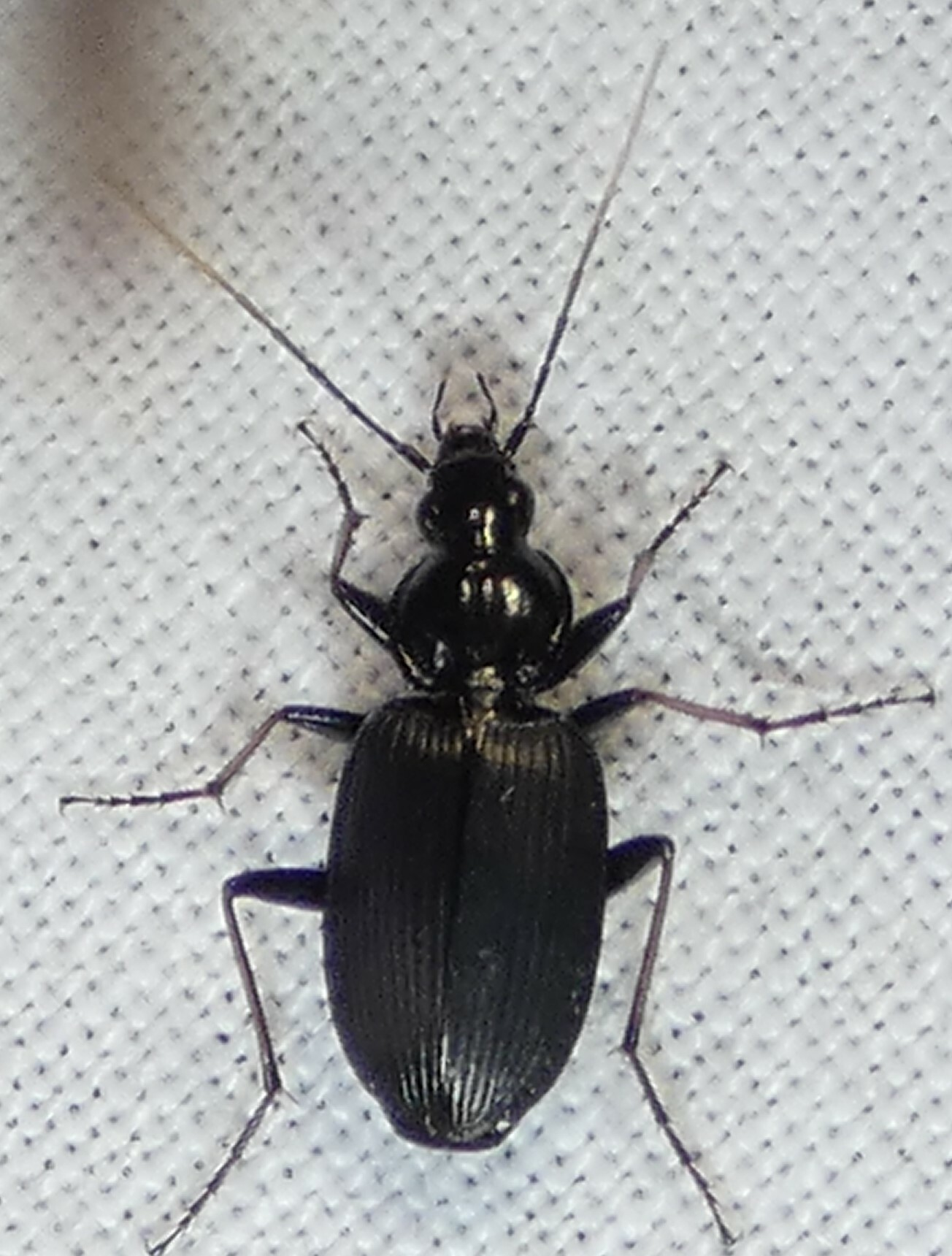
- In Georgia, US

Scientific classification
- Kingdom: Animalia
- Phylum: Arthropoda
- Clade: Pancrustacea
- Class: Insecta
- Order: Coleoptera
- Suborder: Adephaga
- Family: Carabidae
- Genus: Agonum
- Species: A. albicrus

Binomial name
- Agonum albicrus Dejean, 1828

= Agonum albicrus =

Species of beetle

Agonum albicrus is a species of ground beetle in the subfamily Platyninae . It was described by Pierre François Marie Auguste Dejean in 1828. It is widely distributed in eastern United States and extending into Louisiana and southern Ontario, Canada.

== History ==
After Dejean described it in 1828 it was studied again only century and a half later by Lindroth in 1955 and 1966 respectively. Back then it was believed that the species is endemic to Mount Vernon, Alabama but in 2008 it was discovered in New Hampshire (Rockingham County) by Ross T. Bell and then in 2009 in Kansas (Douglas County) by Robert L. Davidson. It is also found in Jackson County, Florida and Latimer County, Oklahoma as well as Ontario.
