= Agonum sulcipenne =

Scientific classification
- Domain: Eukaryota
- Kingdom: Animalia
- Phylum: Arthropoda
- Class: Insecta
- Order: Coleoptera
- Suborder: Adephaga
- Family: Carabidae
- Genus: Agonum
- Species: A. sulcipenne

Binomial name
- Agonum sulcipenne G. Horn, 1881

Species of beetle

Agonum sulcipenne is a species of ground beetle in the Platyninae subfamily that can be found in the United States.
