= Agonum moerens =

Scientific classification
- Kingdom: Animalia
- Phylum: Arthropoda
- Class: Insecta
- Order: Coleoptera
- Suborder: Adephaga
- Family: Carabidae
- Genus: Agonum
- Species: A. moerens

Binomial name
- Agonum moerens Dejean, 1828

Species of beetle

Agonum moerens is a species of ground beetle in the family Carabidae. It is found in North America.
