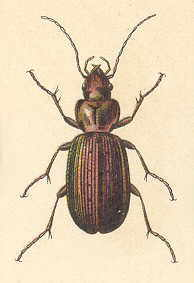

Scientific classification
- Domain: Eukaryota
- Kingdom: Animalia
- Phylum: Arthropoda
- Class: Insecta
- Order: Coleoptera
- Suborder: Adephaga
- Family: Carabidae
- Genus: Agonum
- Species: A. ericeti

Binomial name
- Agonum ericeti Panzer, 1809

= Agonum ericeti =

Species of beetle

Agonum ericeti is a species of ground beetle in the Platyninae subfamily that can be found in all Europe except for Spain and Portugal.

== Description ==
Beetle length is from 5–7.2 millimetres (0.20–0.28 in), a width not exceeding 2.9 millimetres (0.11 in). The upper body is usually one colour, bronze or copper-red, rarely black and bronze. Prothorax narrowed in the direction backward more than forward.

== Ecology ==
The species lives in sphagnum bogs.
