= Agonum mutatum =

Scientific classification
- Domain: Eukaryota
- Kingdom: Animalia
- Phylum: Arthropoda
- Class: Insecta
- Order: Coleoptera
- Suborder: Adephaga
- Family: Carabidae
- Genus: Agonum
- Species: A. mutatum

Binomial name
- Agonum mutatum (Gemminger & Harold, 1868)

Species of beetle

Agonum mutatum is a species of ground beetle in the family Carabidae. It is found in North America.
