= Agonum deplanatum =

Scientific classification
- Kingdom: Animalia
- Phylum: Arthropoda
- Clade: Pancrustacea
- Class: Insecta
- Order: Coleoptera
- Suborder: Adephaga
- Family: Carabidae
- Subfamily: Platyninae
- Tribe: Platynini
- Genus: Agonum
- Species: A. deplanatum

Binomial name
- Agonum deplanatum Ménétriés, 1843

Synonyms
- Agonum fallianum (Leng, 1919); Agonum amplicolle (Casey, 1924)

Species of beetle

Agonum deplanatum is a species of ground beetle in the Platyninae subfamily that can be found in the United States.
