= Agonum extimum =

Scientific classification
- Kingdom: Animalia
- Phylum: Arthropoda
- Class: Insecta
- Order: Coleoptera
- Suborder: Adephaga
- Family: Carabidae
- Genus: Agonum
- Species: A. extimum

Binomial name
- Agonum extimum Liebherr, 1986

Species of beetle

Agonum extimum is a species of ground beetle in the family Carabidae. It is found in Central America and North America.
