= Agonum consimile =

Scientific classification
- Kingdom: Animalia
- Phylum: Arthropoda
- Class: Insecta
- Order: Coleoptera
- Suborder: Adephaga
- Family: Carabidae
- Genus: Agonum
- Species: A. consimile

Binomial name
- Agonum consimile (Gyllenhal, 1810)

Species of beetle

Agonum consimile is a species of ground beetle in the Platyninae subfamily. It was described by Leonard Gyllenhaal in 1810. It inhabits countries like Finland, Latvia, Moldavia, Norway, Russia, Sweden, and the United States.
