= Agonum galvestonicum =

Scientific classification
- Kingdom: Animalia
- Phylum: Arthropoda
- Class: Insecta
- Order: Coleoptera
- Suborder: Adephaga
- Family: Carabidae
- Genus: Agonum
- Species: A. galvestonicum

Binomial name
- Agonum galvestonicum (Casey, 1920)

Species of beetle

Agonum galvestonicum is a species of ground beetle in the Platyninae subfamily that is endemic to the United States.
