= Agonum errans =

Scientific classification
- Domain: Eukaryota
- Kingdom: Animalia
- Phylum: Arthropoda
- Class: Insecta
- Order: Coleoptera
- Suborder: Adephaga
- Family: Carabidae
- Genus: Agonum
- Species: A. errans

Binomial name
- Agonum errans Say, 1823

Synonyms
- Agonum subcordatum (LeConte, 1850); Agonum erythropus Kirby, 1837

Species of beetle

Agonum errans is a species of ground beetle from Platyninae subfamily, that can be found in North Dakota, United States and Alberta, Canada.
