= Agonum variolatum =

Scientific classification
- Domain: Eukaryota
- Kingdom: Animalia
- Phylum: Arthropoda
- Class: Insecta
- Order: Coleoptera
- Suborder: Adephaga
- Family: Carabidae
- Genus: Agonum
- Species: A. variolatum

Binomial name
- Agonum variolatum LeConte, 1851

Species of beetle

Agonum variolatum is a species of beetle from family Carabidae that is endemic to the US state of California.
