= Agonum retractum =

Scientific classification
- Domain: Eukaryota
- Kingdom: Animalia
- Phylum: Arthropoda
- Class: Insecta
- Order: Coleoptera
- Suborder: Adephaga
- Family: Carabidae
- Genus: Agonum
- Species: A. retractum

Binomial name
- Agonum retractum LeConte, 1846

Synonyms
- Agonum dilutipenne (Motschulsky, 1865)

Species of beetle

Agonum retractum is a species of ground beetle in the family Carabidae. It is found in North America.
