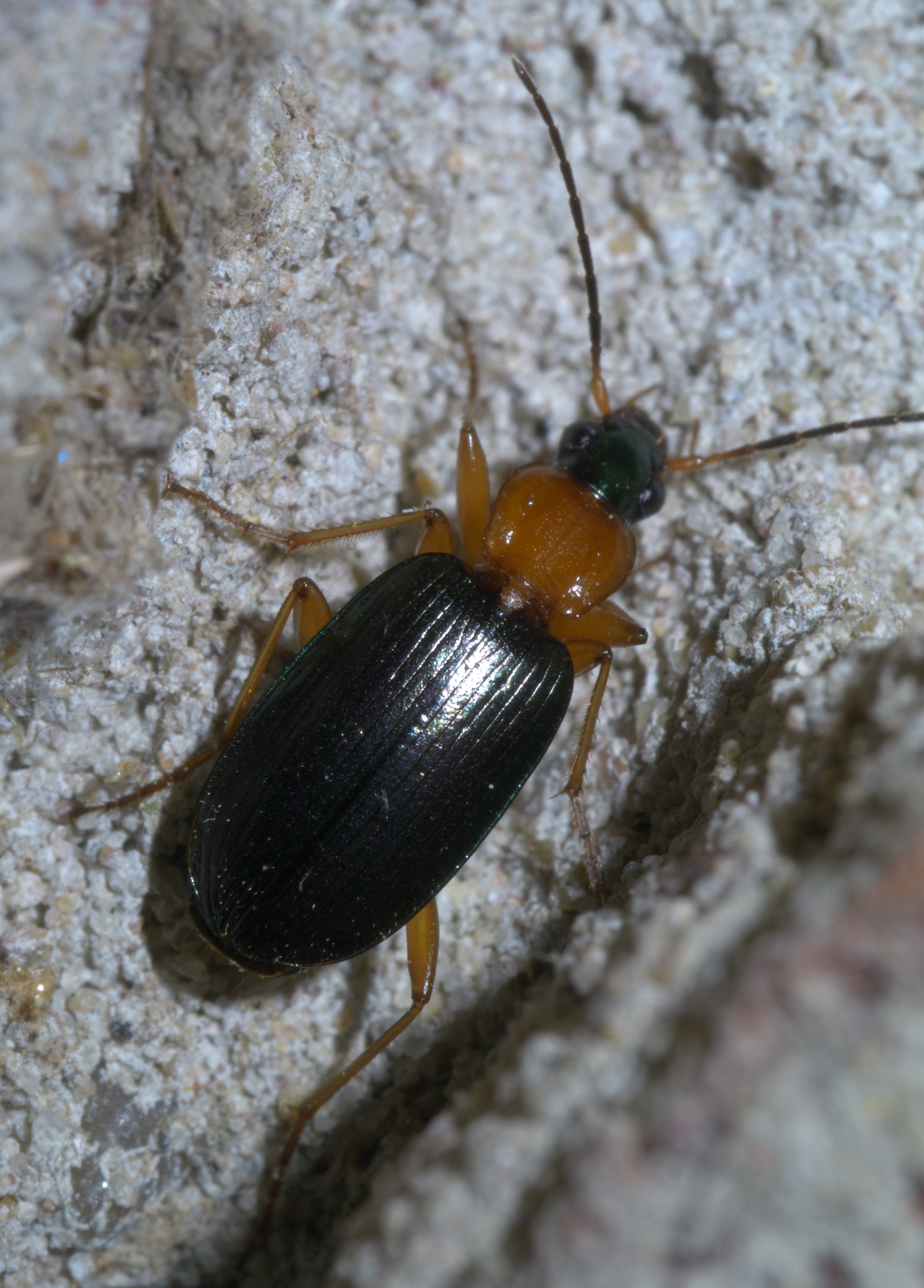

Scientific classification
- Domain: Eukaryota
- Kingdom: Animalia
- Phylum: Arthropoda
- Class: Insecta
- Order: Coleoptera
- Suborder: Adephaga
- Family: Carabidae
- Genus: Agonum
- Species: A. decorum

Binomial name
- Agonum decorum Say, 1823

Synonyms
- Agonum arenarium (Casey, 1920); Agonum californicum (Dejean, 1828); Agonum charmis (Bates, 1884); Agonum cubanum Darlington, 1934; Agonum hornii (Hausen, 1891); Agonum impictum (Casey, 1920); Agonum irruptum (Casey, 1920); Agonum luxatum (Casey, 1920); Agonum obscurum (LeConte, 1848); Agonum simplex (LeConte, 1854); Agonum solutum (Casey, 1920); Agonum syracusense (Hatch, 1926); Agonum tepidum (Casey, 1920); Agonum testaceonotum (Hausen, 1891); Agonum thoracicum (Dejean, 1828); Agonum uteanum (Casey, 1924); Agonum vinnulum (Casey, 1920)

= Agonum decorum =

Species of beetle

Agonum decorum is a species of ground beetle in the Platyninae family, that prefers to live near the waters of North America.

== Distribution ==
It is very widespread in North America (Canada, United States, Mexico), and the Caribbean. It can also be found on Cuba.
