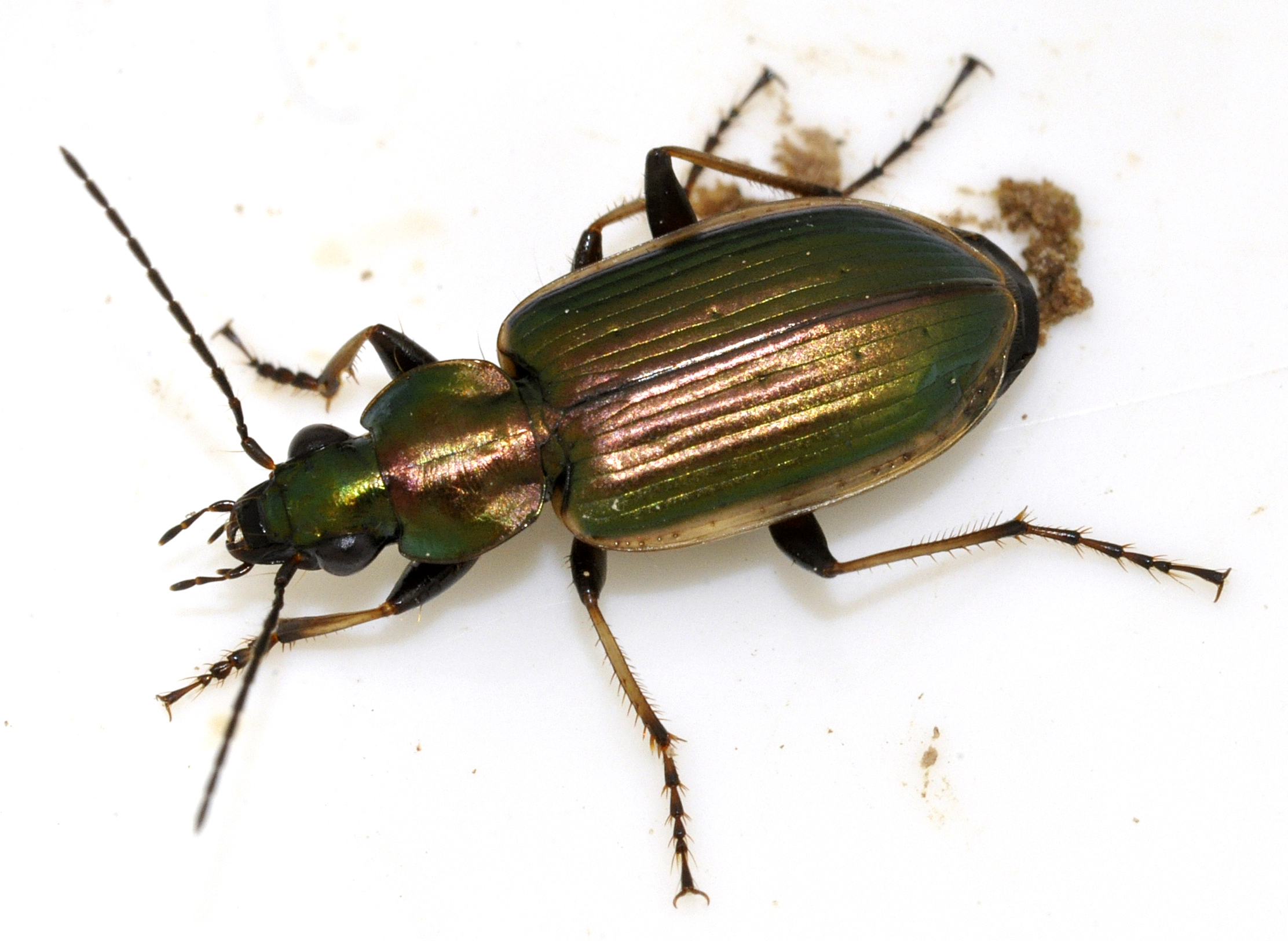

Scientific classification
- Kingdom: Animalia
- Phylum: Arthropoda
- Class: Insecta
- Order: Coleoptera
- Suborder: Adephaga
- Family: Carabidae
- Genus: Agonum
- Species: A. marginatum

Binomial name
- Agonum marginatum (Linnaeus, 1758)

= Agonum marginatum =

Species of beetle

Agonum marginatum is a species of ground beetle in the Platyninae subfamily. It was described by Carl Linnaeus in 1758 and is found throughout Europe, North Africa, Siberia, West Asia, as well as on islands such as Canary, Azores, and Madeira.
