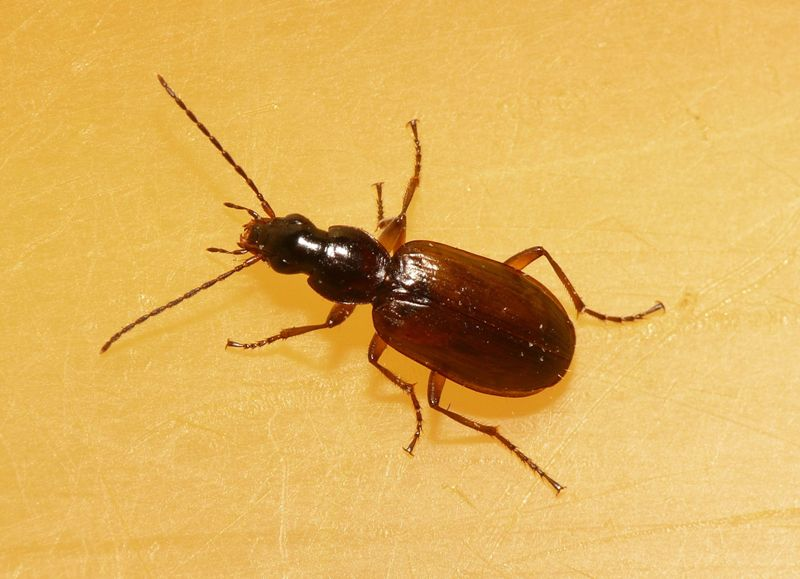

Scientific classification
- Kingdom: Animalia
- Phylum: Arthropoda
- Class: Insecta
- Order: Coleoptera
- Suborder: Adephaga
- Family: Carabidae
- Genus: Agonum
- Species: A. thoreyi

Binomial name
- Agonum thoreyi Dejean, 1828

= Agonum thoreyi =

Species of beetle

Agonum thoreyi is a species of ground beetle native to Europe.
