= Agonum darlingtoni =

Conservation status
- Unranked (NatureServe)

Scientific classification
- Domain: Eukaryota
- Kingdom: Animalia
- Phylum: Arthropoda
- Class: Insecta
- Order: Coleoptera
- Suborder: Adephaga
- Family: Carabidae
- Genus: Agonum
- Species: A. darlingtoni

Binomial name
- Agonum darlingtoni Lindroth, 1954

Species of beetle

Agonum darlingtoni, also known as Darlington's harp ground beetle, is a species of ground beetles, family Carabidae. It is named after P. Jackson Darlington Jr. It occurs in the northeastern North America in the Northeastern United States and Eastern Canada.

== Description ==
Agonum darlingtoni measures 4.9–5.9 mm (0.19–0.23 in) in length. It is black in coloration with iridescent and striated elytra; the eight stria are deeply impressed.

== Ecology ==
It is associated with wet habitats and likely overwinters as an adult.
