= Agonum corvus =

Scientific classification
- Domain: Eukaryota
- Kingdom: Animalia
- Phylum: Arthropoda
- Class: Insecta
- Order: Coleoptera
- Suborder: Adephaga
- Family: Carabidae
- Genus: Agonum
- Species: A. corvus

Binomial name
- Agonum corvus (LeConte, 1860)

Synonyms
- Agonum debiliceps (Casey, 1920); Agonum hyslopi (Casey, 1920)

Species of beetle

Agonum corvus is a species of ground beetle from Platyninae subfamily. It was described by John Lawrence LeConte in 1860 and is endemic to the United States.
