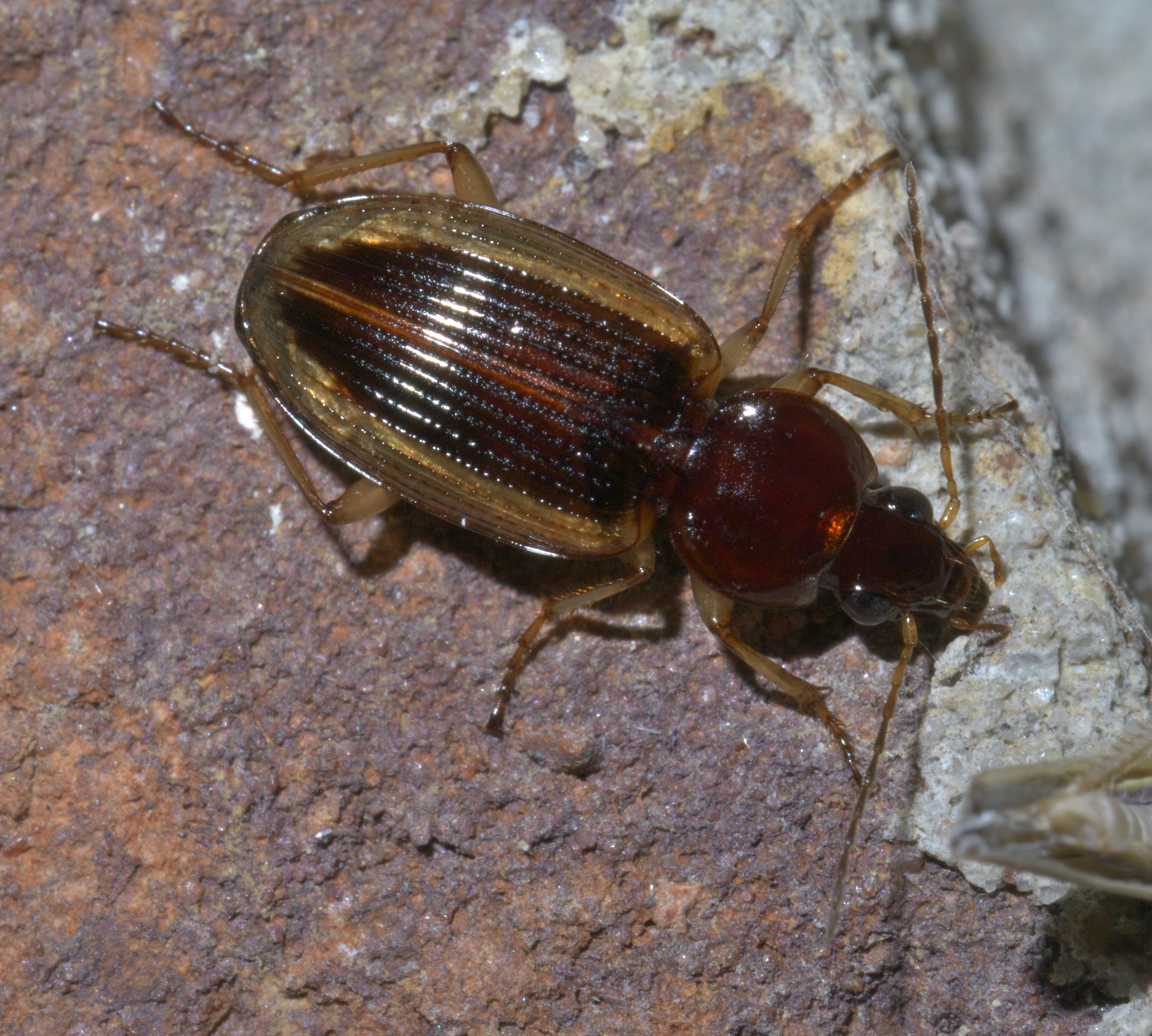

Scientific classification
- Kingdom: Animalia
- Phylum: Arthropoda
- Class: Insecta
- Order: Coleoptera
- Suborder: Adephaga
- Family: Carabidae
- Genus: Agonum
- Species: A. pallipes

Binomial name
- Agonum pallipes (Fabricius, 1787)

= Agonum pallipes =

Species of beetle

Agonum pallipes is a species of ground beetle in the family Carabidae. It is found in North America.
