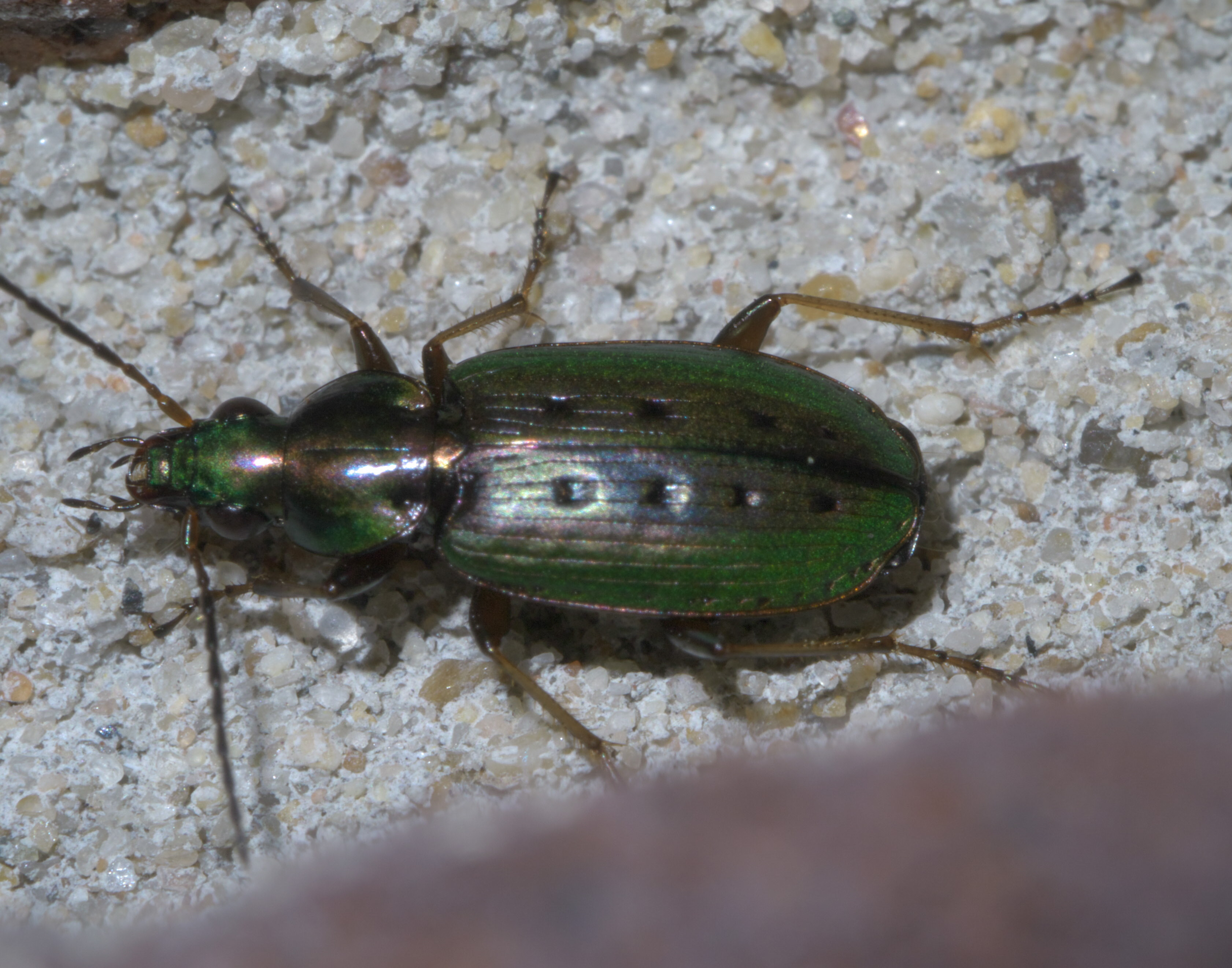
- Agonum octopunctatum

Scientific classification
- Kingdom: Animalia
- Phylum: Arthropoda
- Clade: Pancrustacea
- Class: Insecta
- Order: Coleoptera
- Suborder: Adephaga
- Family: Carabidae
- Tribe: Platynini
- Genus: Agonum; Bonelli, 1810

Type species
- Carabus marginatus Linne, 1758

Subgenera
- Several, see text

Synonyms
- Agonium Solier, 1849

= Agonum =

Genus of beetles

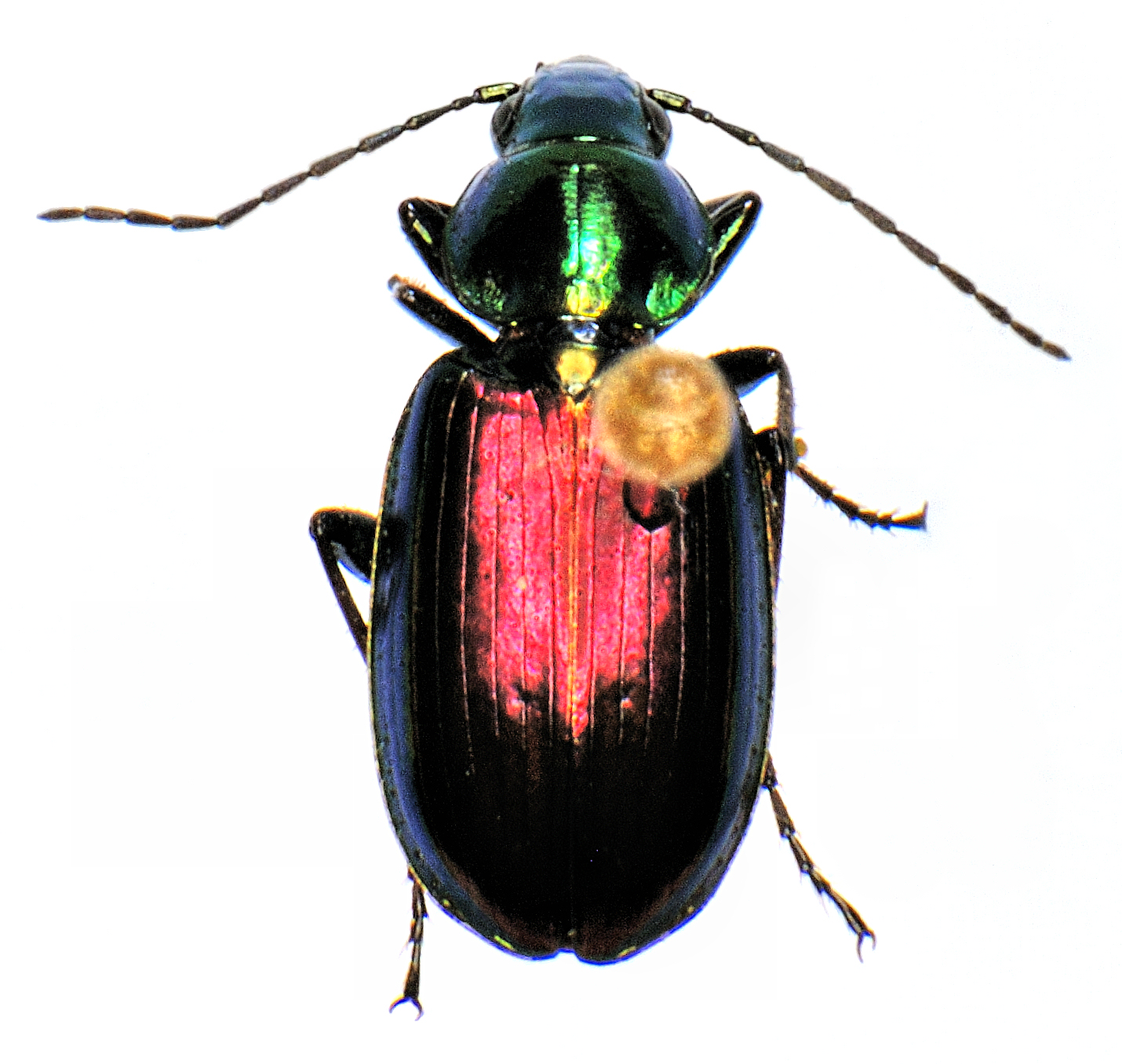
Agonum cupripenne

Agonum is a large genus of ground beetles in the subfamily Harpalinae, tribe Platynini. They are mid-sized to smallish beetles, typically with dark metallic hues – often reddish or bronze, but sometimes black, green etc.

The genus is generally native to the Holarctic and the Mediterranean region; their southern limit in Central Asia and the Himalaya region is less well understood, and they seem to range outward a bit out of their core regions (e.g. into East Africa).

They are wet-loving throughout their life cycle; for example, the genus is well represented in Ireland, where they are more plentiful than anywhere else in Europe.

== Species ==
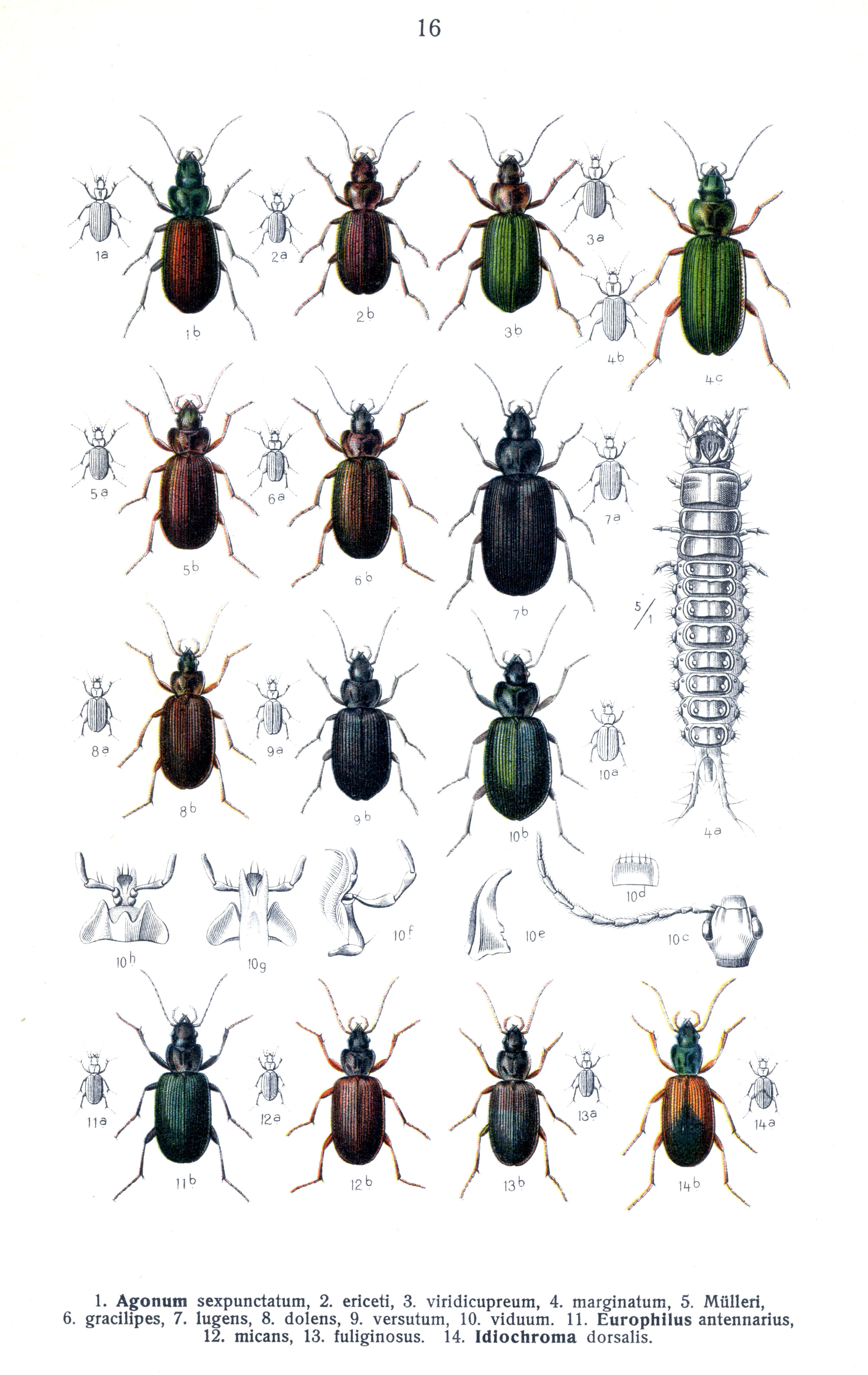
Agonum species (and Anchomenus dorsalis in lower right corner) from Edmund Reitter's Fauna Germanica (1908)

These species and subgenera belong to the genus Agonum.

Subgenus Agonum Bonelli, 1810

Agonum antennarium (Duftschmid, 1812)
Agonum atlantis Antoine, 1957
Agonum bicolor (Dejean, 1828)
Agonum carbonarium Dejean, 1828
Agonum chalcomum (Bates, 1873)
Agonum chalconotum Ménétriés, 1832
Agonum chinense (Boheman, 1858)
Agonum dorsostriatum Fairmaire, 1889
Agonum fallax (A.Morawitz, 1862)
Agonum gracilipes (Duftschmid, 1812)
Agonum humerosum (Semenov, 1889)
Agonum illocatum (Walker, 1858)
Agonum liebherri J.Schmidt, 2008
Agonum madagascariense (Chaudoir, 1843)
Agonum marginatum (Linnaeus, 1758)
Agonum menetriesii Faldermann, 1839
Agonum mesostictum (Bates, 1889)
Agonum monachum (Duftschmid, 1812)
Agonum mongolicum Shilenkov, 1993
Agonum muelleri (Herbst, 1784)
Agonum nigrum Dejean, 1828
Agonum numidicum (Lucas, 1846)
Agonum piceolum (LeConte, 1879)
Agonum placidum (Say, 1823)
Agonum rugicolle Chaudoir, 1846
Agonum scintillans (Boheman, 1858)
Agonum scotti Burgeon, 1937
Agonum semicupreum Fairmaire, 1887
Agonum sordidum Dejean, 1828
Agonum straeleni (Basilewsky, 1953)

Subgenus Europhilus Chaudoir, 1859

Agonum anchomenoides Randall, 1838
Agonum bellicum Lutshnik, 1934
Agonum canadense Goulet, 1969
Agonum charillus (Bates, 1883)
Agonum consimile (Gyllenhal, 1810)
Agonum darlingtoni Lindroth, 1954
Agonum exaratum (Mannerheim, 1853)
Agonum fuliginosum (Panzer, 1809)
Agonum galvestonicum (Casey, 1920)
Agonum gracile Sturm, 1824
Agonum gratiosum (Mannerheim, 1853)
Agonum jurecekianum Jedlicka, 1952
Agonum lutulentum (LeConte, 1854)
Agonum micans (Nicolai, 1822)
Agonum munsteri (Hellén, 1935)
Agonum nipponicum Habu, 1972
Agonum palustre Goulet, 1969
Agonum persecretum Antoine, 1941
Agonum piceum (Linnaeus, 1758)
Agonum picicornoides Lindroth, 1966
Agonum retractum LeConte, 1846
Agonum scitulum Dejean, 1828
Agonum simile Kirby, 1837
Agonum sordens Kirby, 1837
Agonum subtruncatum (Motschulsky, 1860)
Agonum superioris Lindroth, 1966
Agonum temperei (Aubry, 1974)
Agonum thoreyi Dejean, 1828
Agonum variolatum (LeConte, 1851)

Subgenus Olisares Motschulsky, 1865

Agonum aeruginosum Dejean, 1828
Agonum affine Kirby, 1837
Agonum albicrus Dejean, 1828
Agonum anthracinum Dejean, 1831
Agonum basale LeConte, 1846
Agonum belleri (Hatch, 1933)
Agonum brevicolle Dejean, 1828
Agonum collare (Say, 1830)
Agonum corvus (LeConte, 1860)
Agonum crenistriatum (LeConte, 1863)
Agonum crenulatum (LeConte, 1854)
Agonum cupreum Dejean, 1831
Agonum cupripenne (Say, 1823)
Agonum cyanopis (Bates, 1882)
Agonum cyclifer (Bates, 1884)
Agonum daimio (Bates, 1873)
Agonum deceptivum (LeConte, 1879)
Agonum decorum (Say, 1823)
Agonum deplanatum Ménétriés, 1843
Agonum dolens (C.R.Sahlberg, 1827)
Agonum duftschmidi J.Schmidt, 1994
Agonum elongatulum (Dejean, 1828)
Agonum emarginatum (Gyllenhal, 1827)
Agonum ericeti (Panzer, 1809)
Agonum errans (Say, 1823)
Agonum excavatum Dejean, 1828
Agonum extensicolle (Say, 1823)
Agonum extimum Liebherr, 1986
Agonum ferreum Haldeman, 1843
Agonum fidele Casey, 1920
Agonum fossiger Dejean, 1828
Agonum gerdmuelleri J.Schmidt, 1994
Agonum gisellae Csiki, 1931
Agonum harrisii LeConte, 1846
Agonum hypocrita (Apfelbeck, 1904)
Agonum imitans (Notman, 1919)
Agonum impressum (Panzer, 1796)
Agonum jankowskii Lafer, 1992
Agonum longicorne Chaudoir, 1846
Agonum lugens (Duftschmid, 1812)
Agonum mandli Jedlicka, 1933
Agonum melanarium Dejean, 1828
Agonum metallescens (LeConte, 1854)
Agonum moerens Dejean, 1828
Agonum muiri Liebherr, 1984
Agonum mutatum (Gemminger & Harold, 1868)
Agonum nutans (Say, 1823)
Agonum octopunctatum (Fabricius, 1798)
Agonum pacificum Casey, 1920
Agonum pallipes (Fabricius, 1787)
Agonum parextimum Liebherr, 1986
Agonum patinale (Bates, 1882)
Agonum permoestum Puel, 1938
Agonum propinquum (Gemminger & Harold, 1868)
Agonum punctiforme (Say, 1823)
Agonum quadrimaculatum (G.Horn, 1885)
Agonum rigidulum (Casey, 1920)
Agonum rufipes Dejean, 1828
Agonum sculptipes (Bates, 1883)
Agonum scutifer (Bates, 1878)
Agonum sexpunctatum (Linnaeus, 1758)
Agonum striatopunctatum Dejean, 1828
Agonum suavissimum (Bates, 1883)
Agonum sulcipenne (G.Horn, 1881)
Agonum suturale Say, 1830
Agonum tenue (LeConte, 1854)
Agonum texanum (LeConte, 1878)
Agonum trigeminum Lindroth, 1954
Agonum tulliae Mazzei & Brandmayr, 2017
Agonum versutum Sturm, 1824
Agonum viduum (Panzer, 1796)
Agonum viridicupreum (Goeze, 1777)

Subgenus Platynomicrus Casey, 1920
Agonum ferruginosum (Dejean, 1828)
Agonum nigriceps LeConte, 1846
Not assigned to a subgenus

Agonum abnormale Jedlicka, 1960
Agonum angulifer (Casey, 1920)
Agonum ardoisi Puel, 1938
Agonum bulgani Jedlicka, 1969
Agonum comatum (Andrewes, 1923)
Agonum fur (Andrewes, 1930)
Agonum graciloides Jedlicka, 1946
Agonum holzschuhi Morvan, 2002
Agonum inaequale Putzeys, 1875
Agonum ladakense (Bates, 1878)
Agonum leucomerum (Perroud, 1864)
Agonum limbaticolle (Gemminger & Harold, 1868)
Agonum luczoti Laporte, 1835
Agonum luteum (Andrewes, 1923)
Agonum mokoto Burgeon, 1937
Agonum nanum Jedlicka, 1965
Agonum oryctus (Andrewes, 1933)
Agonum platyderum (Chaudoir, 1854)
Agonum praetor (Andrewes, 1930)
Agonum quadripustulatum (Dejean, 1831)
Agonum rotundicolle (Motschulsky, 1865)
Agonum rufotestaceum Jedlicka, 1960
Agonum rugaticolle (Gemminger & Harold, 1868)
Agonum stenuiti Morvan, 1998
Agonum triimpressum (R.F.Sahlberg, 1844)
Agonum triseriatum (Chaudoir, 1854)
Agonum viride Jedlicka, 1938
†Agonum antiquum Piton, 1940

== See also ==
- List of Agonum species
