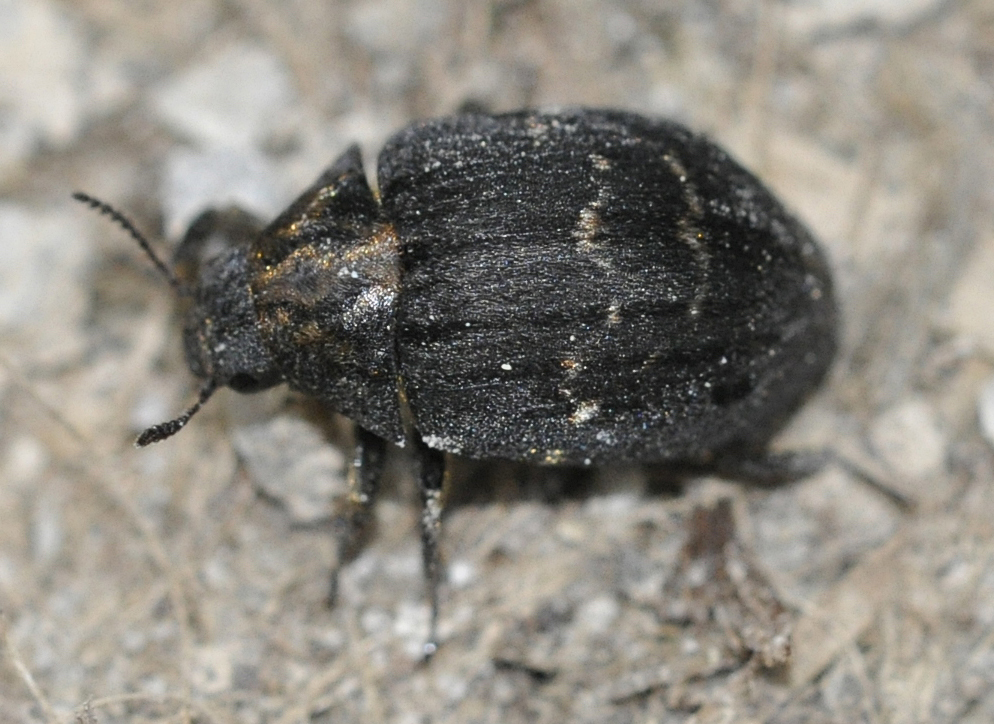
- Byrrhus fasciatus

Scientific classification
- Kingdom: Animalia
- Phylum: Arthropoda
- Class: Insecta
- Order: Coleoptera
- Suborder: Polyphaga
- Infraorder: Elateriformia
- Family: Byrrhidae
- Subfamily: Byrrhinae; Latreille, 1804

Tribes
- Byrrhini Latreille, 1804; Exomellini Casey, 1914; Morychini El Moursy, 1961; Pedilophorini Casey, 1912; Simplocariini Mulsant and Rey, 1869

= Byrrhinae =

Subfamily of beetles

Byrrhinae is a subfamily of pill beetles in the family Byrrhidae. There are about 25 genera and at least 160 described species in Byrrhinae.

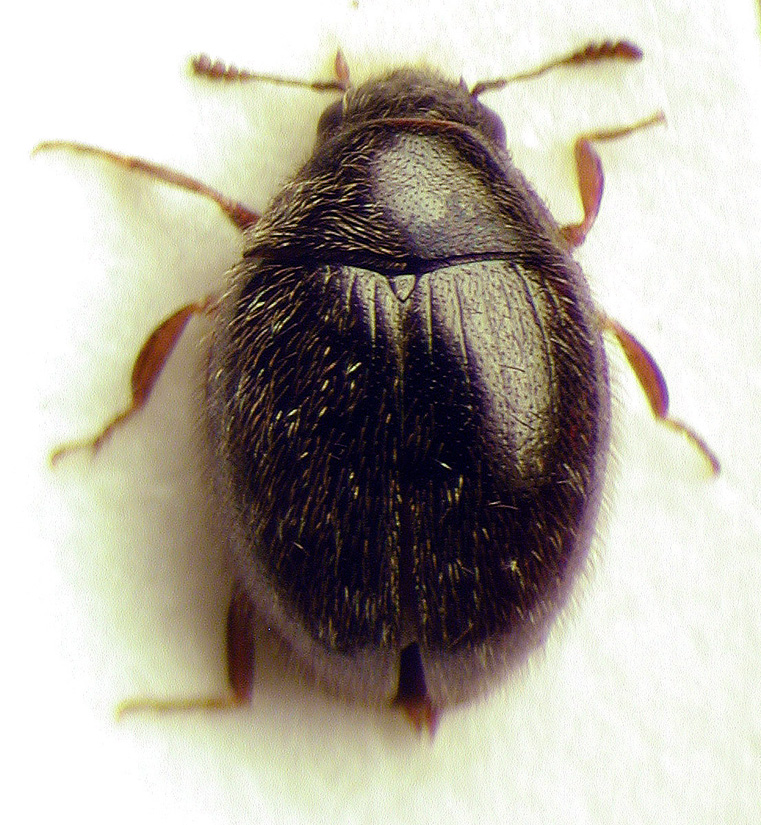
Simplocaria semistriata

== Genera ==
These 25 genera belong to the subfamily Byrrhinae:

- Akidomorychus Lawrence, 2013
- Arctobyrrhus Münster, 1902
- Brachybyrrhulus Lawrence, 2013
- Byrrhochomus Fabbri, 2003
- Byrrhus Linnaeus, 1758
- Carpathobyrrhulus Ganglbauer, 1902
- Chrysobyrrhulus Reitter, 1911
- Curimus Erichson, 1846
- Cytilus Erichson, 1847
- Eusomalia Casey, 1912
- Exomella Casey, 1912
- Idiothrix Lawrence, 2013
- Lamprobyrrhulus Ganglbauer, 1902
- Lasiomorychus Ganglbauer, 1902
- Lioligus Casey, 1912
- Lioon Casey, 1912
- Listemus Casey, 1912
- Morychus Erichson, 1847
- Nothochaetes Lawrence, 2013
- Notolioon Lawrence, 2013
- Pedilophorus Steffahny, 1842
- Porcinolus Mulsant, 1869
- Pseudomorychus Lawrence, 2013
- Simplocaria Stephens, 1830
- Trichobyrrhulus Ganglbauer, 1902
