= C. spinosa =

C. spinosa may refer to:

- Caesalpinia spinosa, the tara, a small leguminous tree species native to Peru
- Calceolispongia spinosa, an extinct crinoid species
- Calicotome spinosa, a very spiny, densely branched shrub species
- Canadia spinosa, an extinct annelid worm species
- Capparis spinosa, a perennial spiny shrub species
- Caragana spinosa, a flowering plant species in the genus Caragana
- Carica spinosa, synonym for a flowering plant species Jacaratia spinosa
- Catunaregum spinosa, a flowering plant species in the genus Catunaregum
- Celtis spinosa, a woodland plant species in the genus Celtis
- Chaetophora spinosa, a beetle species in the genus Chaetophora
- Chaetopleura spinosa, a mollusc species in the genus Chaetopleura
- Chira spinosa, a jumping spider species in the genus Chira
- Chloracantha spinosa, a flowering plant species
- Cleocnemis spinosa, a running crab spider species in the genus Cleocnemis
- Cleome spinosa, a flowering plant species in the genus Cleome
- Cochranella spinosa, a frog species
- Colletia spinosa, a flowering plant species in the genus Colletia
- Conothele spinosa, a medium-sized spider species in the genus Conothele
- Copa spinosa, a sac spider species in the genus Copa

== See also ==
- Spinosa (disambiguation)
