= Cytilus mimicus =

Scientific classification
- Kingdom: Animalia
- Phylum: Arthropoda
- Class: Insecta
- Order: Coleoptera
- Suborder: Polyphaga
- Infraorder: Elateriformia
- Family: Byrrhidae
- Genus: Cytilus
- Species: C. mimicus

Binomial name
- Cytilus mimicus Casey, 1912

Species of beetle

Cytilus mimicus is a species of pill beetle in the family Byrrhidae. It is found in North America.
