= Chaetophora =

Chaetophora may refer to:

- Chaetophora (alga), a genus of algae in the family Chaetophoraceae
- Chaetophora (beetle), a genus of beetles in the family Byrrhidae
