= Arctobyrrhus subcanus =

Scientific classification
- Kingdom: Animalia
- Phylum: Arthropoda
- Class: Insecta
- Order: Coleoptera
- Suborder: Polyphaga
- Infraorder: Elateriformia
- Family: Byrrhidae
- Genus: Arctobyrrhus
- Species: A. subcanus

Binomial name
- Arctobyrrhus subcanus (LeConte, 1878)

Species of beetle

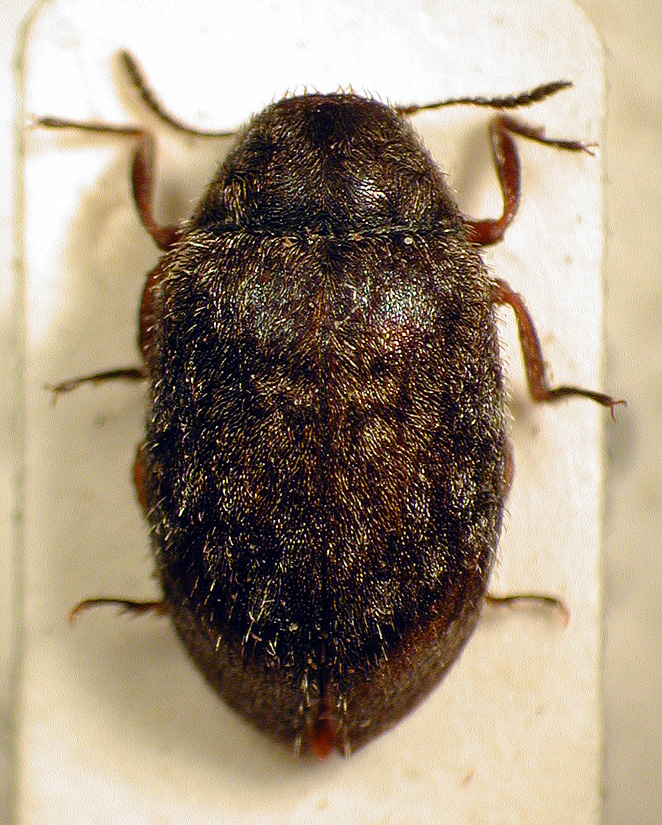

Arctobyrrhus subcanus is a species of pill beetle in the family Byrrhidae. It is found in North America.
