= Morychus oblongus =

Scientific classification
- Domain: Eukaryota
- Kingdom: Animalia
- Phylum: Arthropoda
- Class: Insecta
- Order: Coleoptera
- Suborder: Polyphaga
- Infraorder: Elateriformia
- Family: Byrrhidae
- Genus: Morychus
- Species: M. oblongus

Binomial name
- Morychus oblongus (LeConte, 1857)

Species of beetle

Morychus oblongus is a species of pill beetle in the family Byrrhidae. It is found in North America.
