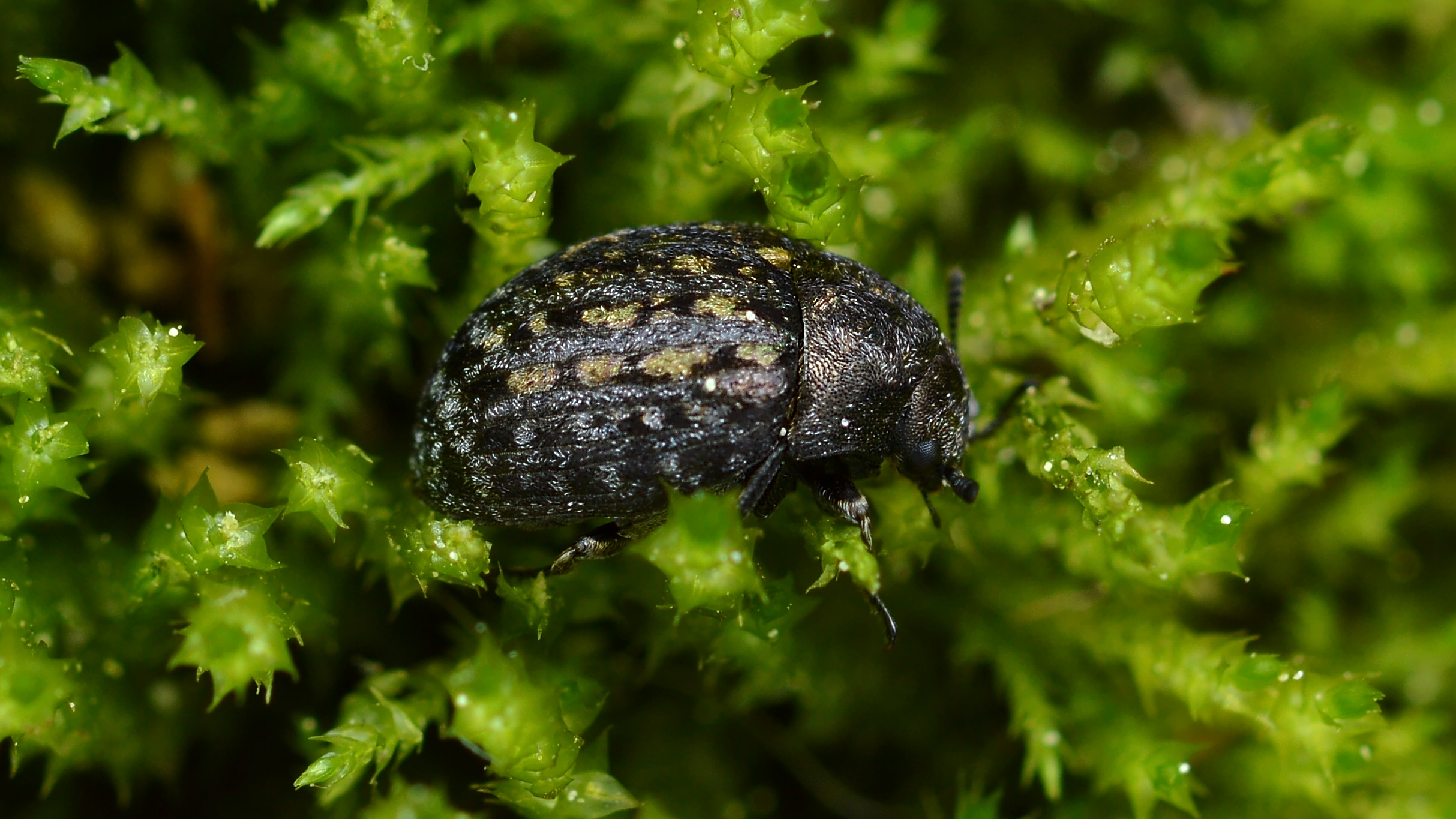

Scientific classification
- Domain: Eukaryota
- Kingdom: Animalia
- Phylum: Arthropoda
- Class: Insecta
- Order: Coleoptera
- Suborder: Polyphaga
- Infraorder: Elateriformia
- Family: Byrrhidae
- Genus: Cytilus
- Species: C. alternatus

Binomial name
- Cytilus alternatus (Say, 1825)

= Cytilus alternatus =

Species of beetle

Cytilus alternatus is a species of pill beetle in the family Byrrhidae. It is found in North America.
