= Morychus =

Morychus (Ancient Greek: Μόρυχος) may refer to:

- Morychus (beetle), a genus of pill beetle
- Morychus (poet), an ancient Greek tragic poet, ridiculed by Aristophanes for his gluttony
- Morychus, an epithet of god Dionysus
