= Curimopsis setulosa =

Scientific classification
- Domain: Eukaryota
- Kingdom: Animalia
- Phylum: Arthropoda
- Class: Insecta
- Order: Coleoptera
- Suborder: Polyphaga
- Infraorder: Elateriformia
- Family: Byrrhidae
- Genus: Curimopsis
- Species: C. setulosa

Binomial name
- Curimopsis setulosa (Mannerheim, 1852)

Species of beetle

Curimopsis setulosa is a species of pill beetle in the family Byrrhidae. It is found in North America.
