= Exomella merickeli =

Scientific classification
- Domain: Eukaryota
- Kingdom: Animalia
- Phylum: Arthropoda
- Class: Insecta
- Order: Coleoptera
- Suborder: Polyphaga
- Infraorder: Elateriformia
- Family: Byrrhidae
- Genus: Exomella
- Species: E. merickeli

Binomial name
- Exomella merickeli Johnson, 1985

Species of beetle

Exomella merickeli is a species of pill beetle in the family Byrrhidae. It is found in North America.
