= Byrrhus concolor =

Scientific classification
- Domain: Eukaryota
- Kingdom: Animalia
- Phylum: Arthropoda
- Class: Insecta
- Order: Coleoptera
- Suborder: Polyphaga
- Infraorder: Elateriformia
- Family: Byrrhidae
- Genus: Byrrhus
- Species: B. concolor

Binomial name
- Byrrhus concolor Kirby, 1837

Species of beetle

Byrrhus concolor is a species of pill beetle in the family Byrrhidae. It is found in North America.
