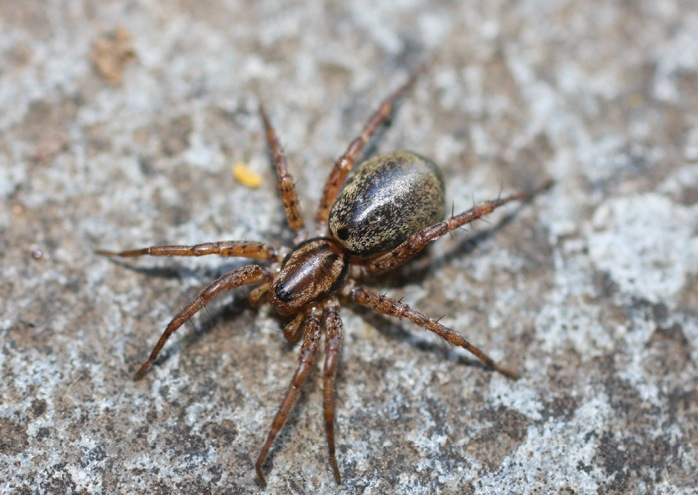
- Female
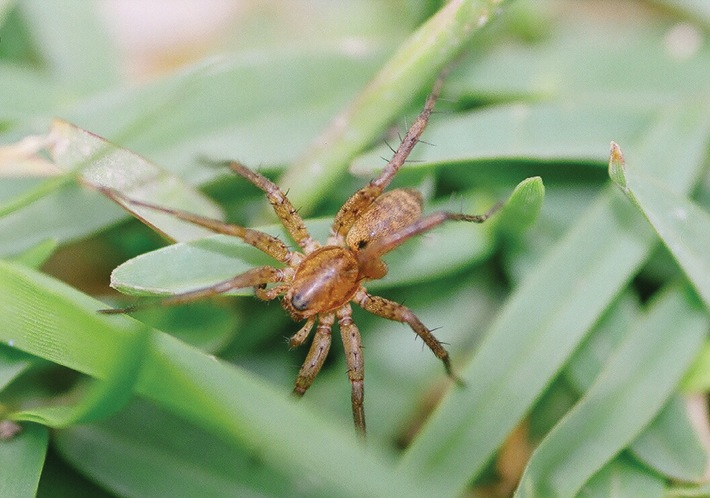
- Male

Scientific classification
- Kingdom: Animalia
- Phylum: Arthropoda
- Subphylum: Chelicerata
- Class: Arachnida
- Order: Araneae
- Infraorder: Araneomorphae
- Family: Corinnidae
- Genus: Copa
- Species: C. kei

Binomial name
- Copa kei Haddad, 2013
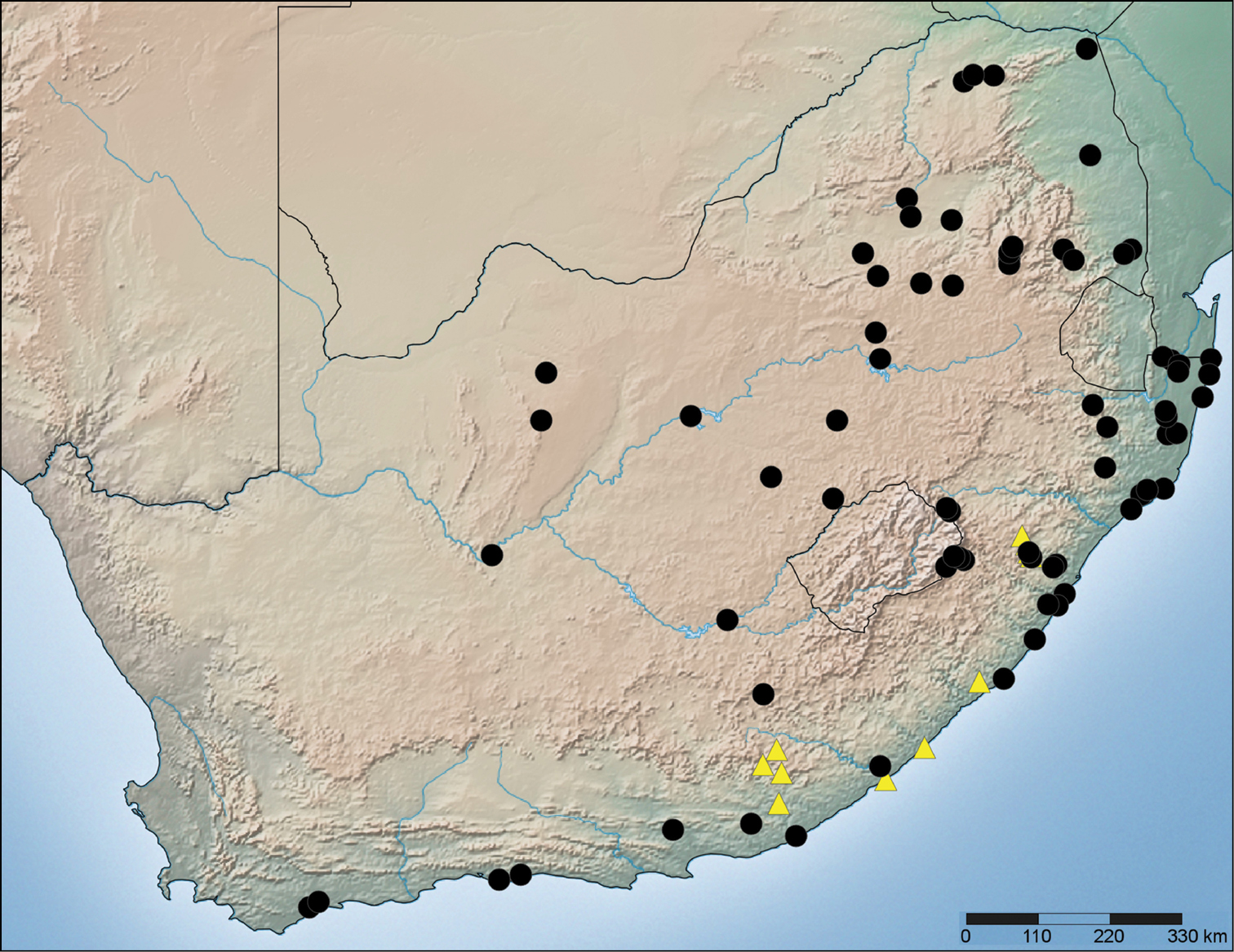
- Cope kei shown as yellow triangles. Copa flavoplumosa shown as black circles.

= Copa kei =

Kei ground lycosiform sac spider

Species of spider

Copa kei is a species of spider in the family Corinnidae. The species is endemic to eastern South Africa. The species epithet is named after Kei Mouth.

== Distribution ==
Copa kei is endemic to the Eastern Cape and KwaZulu-Natal provinces of South Africa.

Notable locations include Dwesa Nature Reserve, Cwebe Nature Reserve, Hogsback, Kei Mouth, and Karkloof Nature Reserve.

== Habitat and ecology ==
Copa kei is a free-living ground-dweller mainly found in the leaf litter layer of Afromontane and coastal forests, where it has been recorded at altitudes ranging from 7 to 1,505 m above sea level.

The species inhabits Forest, Savanna, and Thicket biomes.

== Description ==
Copa kei is known from both sexes. Like other members of its genus, it is a medium-sized spider that closely resembles wolf spiders (Lycosidae) in general appearance and is well camouflaged.

== Conservation ==
Copa kei is listed as Least Concern by the South African National Biodiversity Institute. Although threatened by habitat loss for urbanization and agricultural activities in parts of its range, it is well protected in several areas. The species is recorded from three protected areas.
