= Byrrhus americanus =

Scientific classification
- Domain: Eukaryota
- Kingdom: Animalia
- Phylum: Arthropoda
- Class: Insecta
- Order: Coleoptera
- Suborder: Polyphaga
- Infraorder: Elateriformia
- Family: Byrrhidae
- Genus: Byrrhus
- Species: B. americanus

Binomial name
- Byrrhus americanus LeConte, 1850

Species of beetle

Byrrhus americanus is a species of pill beetle in the family Byrrhidae. It is found in North America.
