= Listemus acuminatus =

Scientific classification
- Domain: Eukaryota
- Kingdom: Animalia
- Phylum: Arthropoda
- Class: Insecta
- Order: Coleoptera
- Suborder: Polyphaga
- Infraorder: Elateriformia
- Family: Byrrhidae
- Genus: Listemus
- Species: L. acuminatus

Binomial name
- Listemus acuminatus (Mannerheim, 1852)

Species of beetle

Listemus acuminatus is a species of pill beetle in the family Byrrhidae. It is found in North America.
