= Lioligus nitidus =

Scientific classification
- Domain: Eukaryota
- Kingdom: Animalia
- Phylum: Arthropoda
- Class: Insecta
- Order: Coleoptera
- Suborder: Polyphaga
- Infraorder: Elateriformia
- Family: Byrrhidae
- Genus: Lioligus
- Species: L. nitidus

Binomial name
- Lioligus nitidus (Motschulsky, 1845)

Species of beetle

Lioligus nitidus is a species of pill beetle in the family Byrrhidae. It is found in North America.
