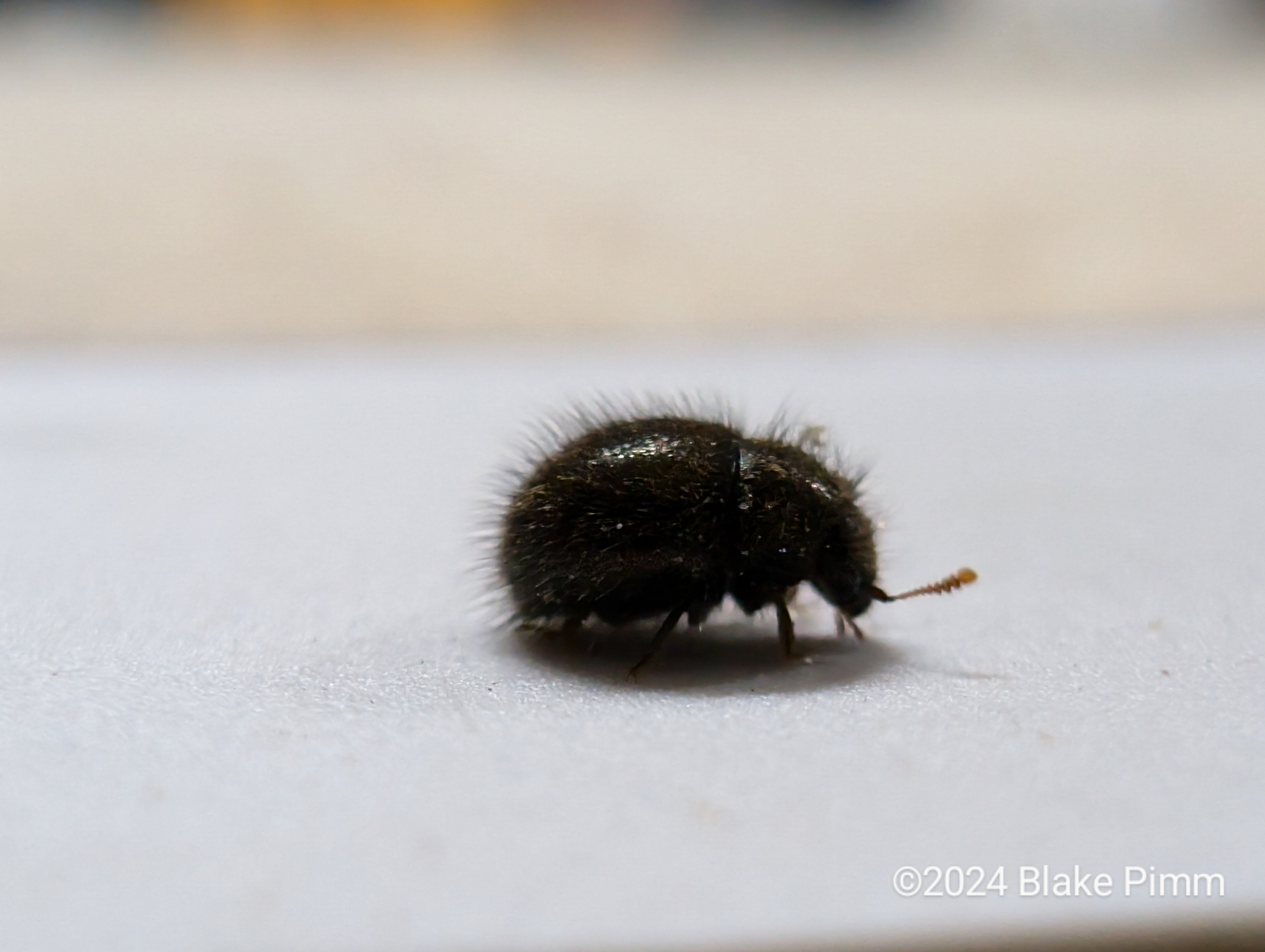

Scientific classification
- Kingdom: Animalia
- Phylum: Arthropoda
- Class: Insecta
- Order: Coleoptera
- Suborder: Polyphaga
- Infraorder: Elateriformia
- Family: Byrrhidae
- Genus: Pseudomorychus
- Species: P. mixtus

Binomial name
- Pseudomorychus mixtus (Lea, 1907)

Synonyms
- Pedilophorus mixtus Lea, A.M. 1907

= Pseudomorychus mixtus =

Species of beetle

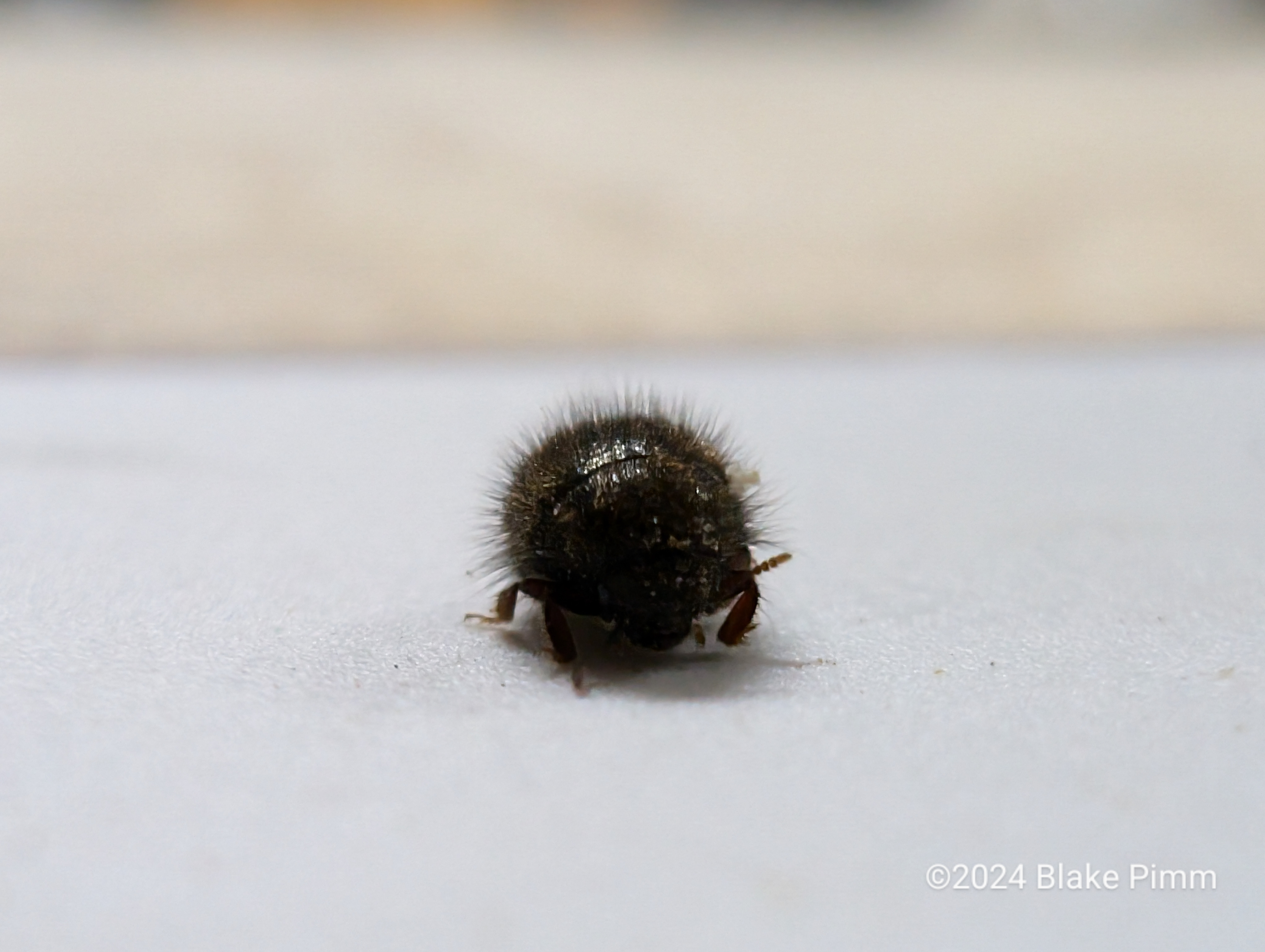
Pseudomorychus mixtus

Pseudomorychus mixtus is a weevil in the genus Pseudomorychus, a pill beetle in the subfamily Byrrhinae of the family Byrrhidae.

== Distribution ==
This beetle is endemic to Australia and occurs in South Australia, Tasmania and Victoria.

== Appearance ==
This species is a small black weevil measuring less than 1 mm. It is black in appearance with a rounded abdomen. The entire insect is covered in long fine hairs except for its finely broken up antennae.

== Records ==
The only known photographed record is a live record taken via iNaturalist observation by Blake Pimm.
