= Lioligus pallidus =

Scientific classification
- Kingdom: Animalia
- Phylum: Arthropoda
- Class: Insecta
- Order: Coleoptera
- Suborder: Polyphaga
- Infraorder: Elateriformia
- Family: Byrrhidae
- Genus: Lioligus
- Species: L. pallidus

Binomial name
- Lioligus pallidus Casey, 1912

Species of beetle

Lioligus pallidus is a species of pill beetles in the family Byrrhidae. It is found in North America.
