= Byrrhus geminatus =

Scientific classification
- Kingdom: Animalia
- Phylum: Arthropoda
- Class: Insecta
- Order: Coleoptera
- Suborder: Polyphaga
- Infraorder: Elateriformia
- Family: Byrrhidae
- Genus: Byrrhus
- Species: B. geminatus

Binomial name
- Byrrhus geminatus LeConte, 1854

Species of beetle

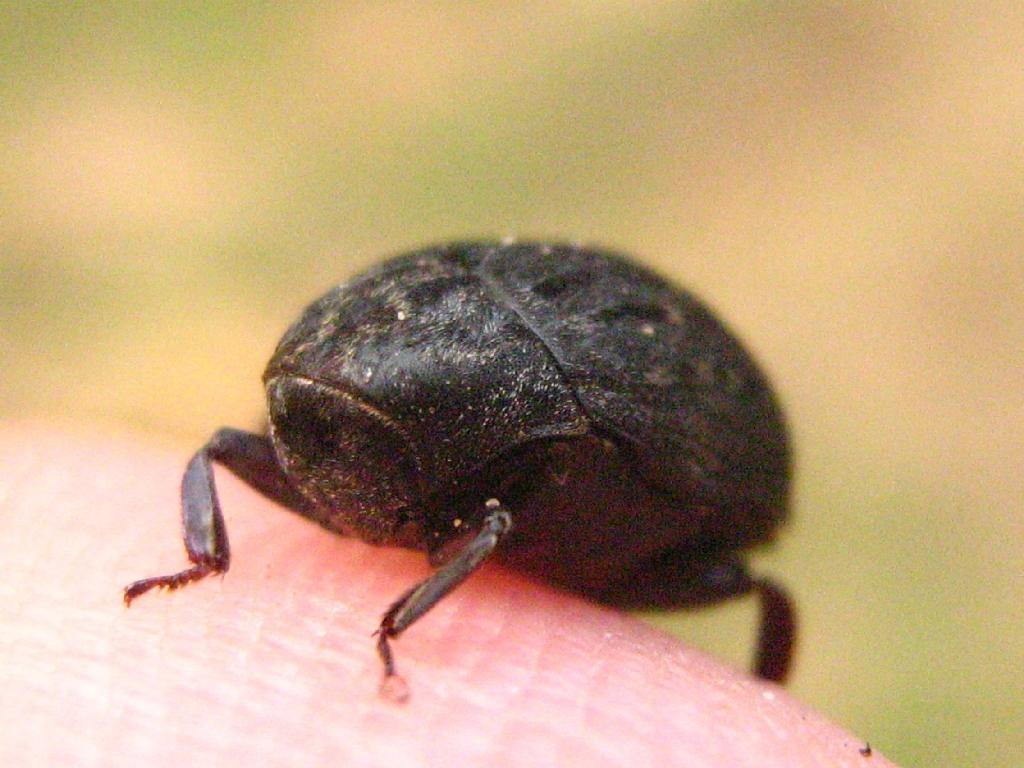

Byrrhus geminatus is a species of pill beetle in the family Byrrhidae. It is found in North America.
