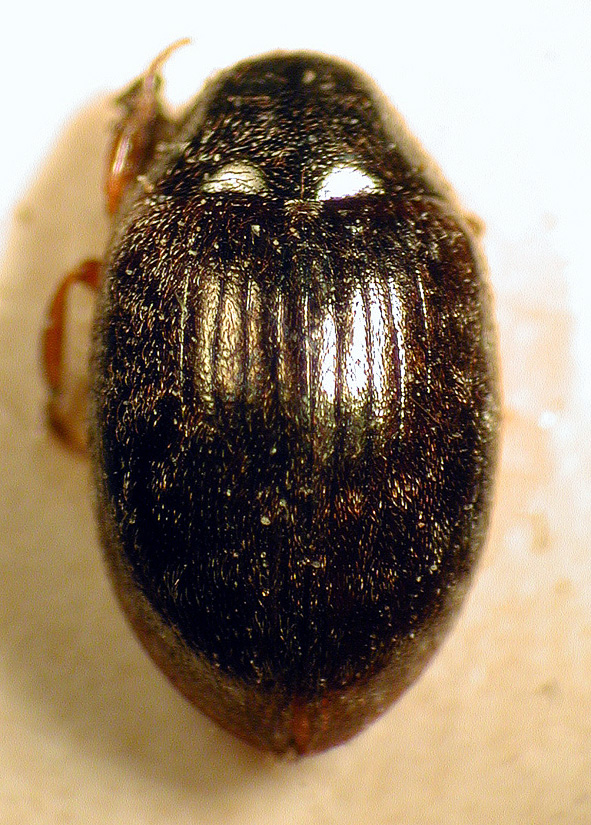
- Simplocaria metallica

Scientific classification
- Domain: Eukaryota
- Kingdom: Animalia
- Phylum: Arthropoda
- Class: Insecta
- Order: Coleoptera
- Suborder: Polyphaga
- Infraorder: Elateriformia
- Family: Byrrhidae
- Subfamily: Byrrhinae
- Tribe: Simplocariini; Mulsant & Rey, 1869

= Simplocariini =

Tribe of beetles

Simplocariini is a tribe of pill beetles in the family Byrrhidae. There are about 9 genera and more than 40 described species in Simplocariini.

== Genera ==
These nine genera belong to the tribe Simplocariini:

- Chrysosimplocaria Paulus, 1982
- Exomella Casey, 1914
- Himalayoligus Fabbri, 2002
- Horiella Tazikawa, 1983
- Lasiomorychus Ganglbauer, 1902
- Lioligus Casey, 1912
- Lioon Casey, 1912
- Simplocaria Stephens, 1829
- Trichobyrrhulus Ganglbauer, 1902
