= Listemus kootenai =

Scientific classification
- Domain: Eukaryota
- Kingdom: Animalia
- Phylum: Arthropoda
- Class: Insecta
- Order: Coleoptera
- Suborder: Polyphaga
- Infraorder: Elateriformia
- Family: Byrrhidae
- Genus: Listemus
- Species: L. kootenai

Binomial name
- Listemus kootenai Johnson, 1991

Species of beetle

Listemus kootenai is a species of pill beetle in the family Byrrhidae. It is found in North America.
