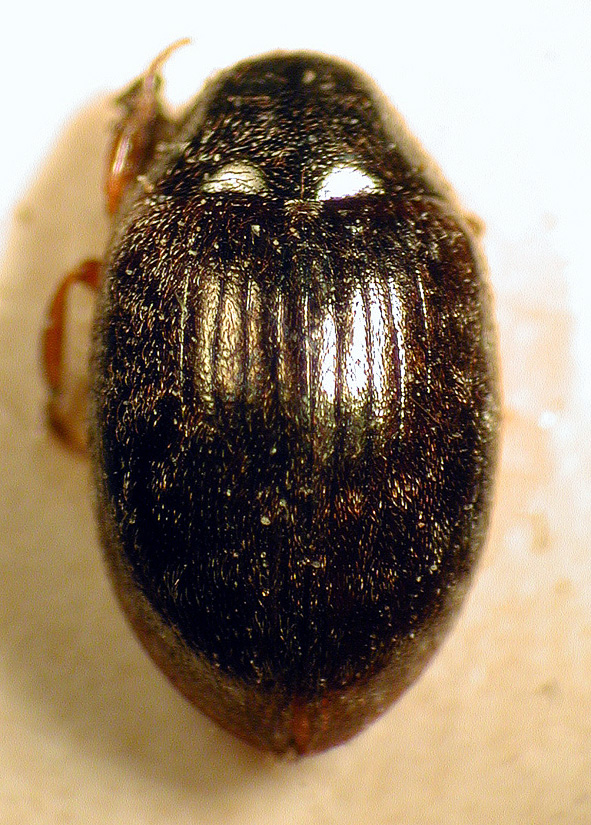

Scientific classification
- Domain: Eukaryota
- Kingdom: Animalia
- Phylum: Arthropoda
- Class: Insecta
- Order: Coleoptera
- Suborder: Polyphaga
- Infraorder: Elateriformia
- Family: Byrrhidae
- Genus: Simplocaria
- Species: S. metallica

Binomial name
- Simplocaria metallica (Sturm, 1807)

= Simplocaria metallica =

Species of beetle

Simplocaria metallica is a species of pill beetle in the family Byrrhidae. It is found in Europe and Northern Asia (excluding China) and North America.

S. metallica is an obligate herbivore, often feeding from three main moss species: Pohlia filum, Ceratodon purpureus, and Bryum arcticum. Data suggests that this diet is shared between males and females, preferring the moss genera, Pohlia.
