= Lioon nezperce =

Scientific classification
- Domain: Eukaryota
- Kingdom: Animalia
- Phylum: Arthropoda
- Class: Insecta
- Order: Coleoptera
- Suborder: Polyphaga
- Infraorder: Elateriformia
- Family: Byrrhidae
- Genus: Lioon
- Species: L. nezperce

Binomial name
- Lioon nezperce Johnson, 1991

Species of beetle

Lioon nezperce is a species of pill beetle in the family Byrrhidae. It is found in North America.
