= Exomella pleuralis =

Scientific classification
- Kingdom: Animalia
- Phylum: Arthropoda
- Class: Insecta
- Order: Coleoptera
- Suborder: Polyphaga
- Infraorder: Elateriformia
- Family: Byrrhidae
- Genus: Exomella
- Species: E. pleuralis

Binomial name
- Exomella pleuralis (Casey, 1908)

Species of beetle

Exomella pleuralis is a species of pill beetles in the family Byrrhidae. It is found in North America.
