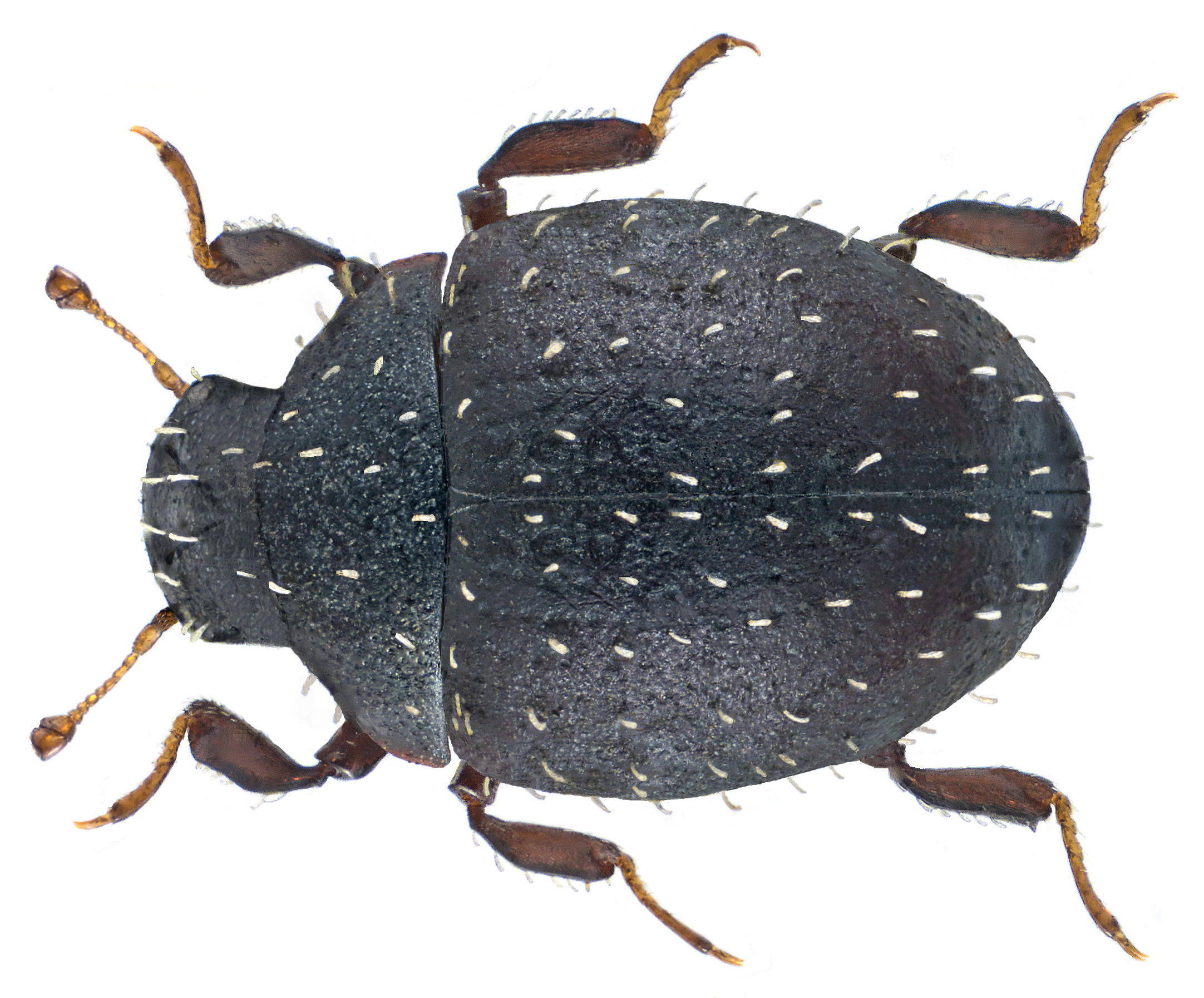

Scientific classification
- Kingdom: Animalia
- Phylum: Arthropoda
- Clade: Pancrustacea
- Class: Insecta
- Order: Coleoptera
- Suborder: Polyphaga
- Infraorder: Elateriformia
- Family: Byrrhidae
- Genus: Chaetophora
- Species: C. spinosa

Binomial name
- Chaetophora spinosa (Rossi, 1794)

= Chaetophora spinosa =

Species of beetle

Chaetophora spinosa is a species of pill beetle in the family Byrrhidae. It is found in Europe and Northern Asia (excluding China) and North America.

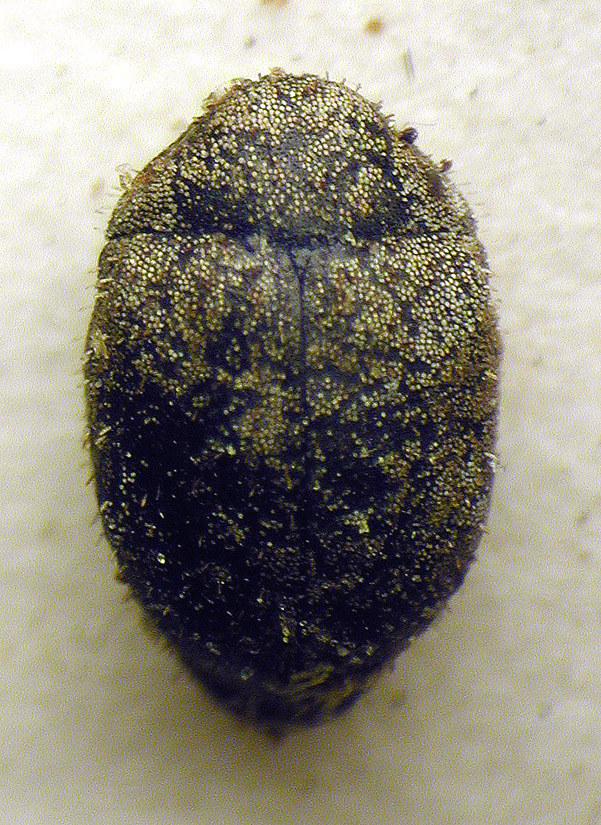
