= Lamprobyrrhulus =

Scientific classification
- Kingdom: Animalia
- Phylum: Arthropoda
- Clade: Pancrustacea
- Class: Insecta
- Order: Coleoptera
- Suborder: Polyphaga
- Infraorder: Elateriformia
- Family: Byrrhidae
- Genus: Lamprobyrrhulus; Ganglbauer, 1902

Genus of beetles

Lamprobyrrhulus is a genus of beetles belonging to the family Byrrhidae.

The species of this genus are found in Europe, Russia and Japan.

Species:

- Lamprobyrrhulus nitidus (Schaller, 1783)
