= Lioligus =

Scientific classification
- Kingdom: Animalia
- Phylum: Arthropoda
- Class: Insecta
- Order: Coleoptera
- Suborder: Polyphaga
- Infraorder: Elateriformia
- Family: Byrrhidae
- Subfamily: Byrrhinae
- Tribe: Simplocariini
- Genus: Lioligus; Casey, 1912

Genus of beetles

Lioligus is a genus of pill beetles in the family Byrrhidae. There are at least 2 described species in Lioligus.

== Species ==
- Lioligus nitidus (Motschulsky, 1845)
- Lioligus pallidus Casey, 1912
