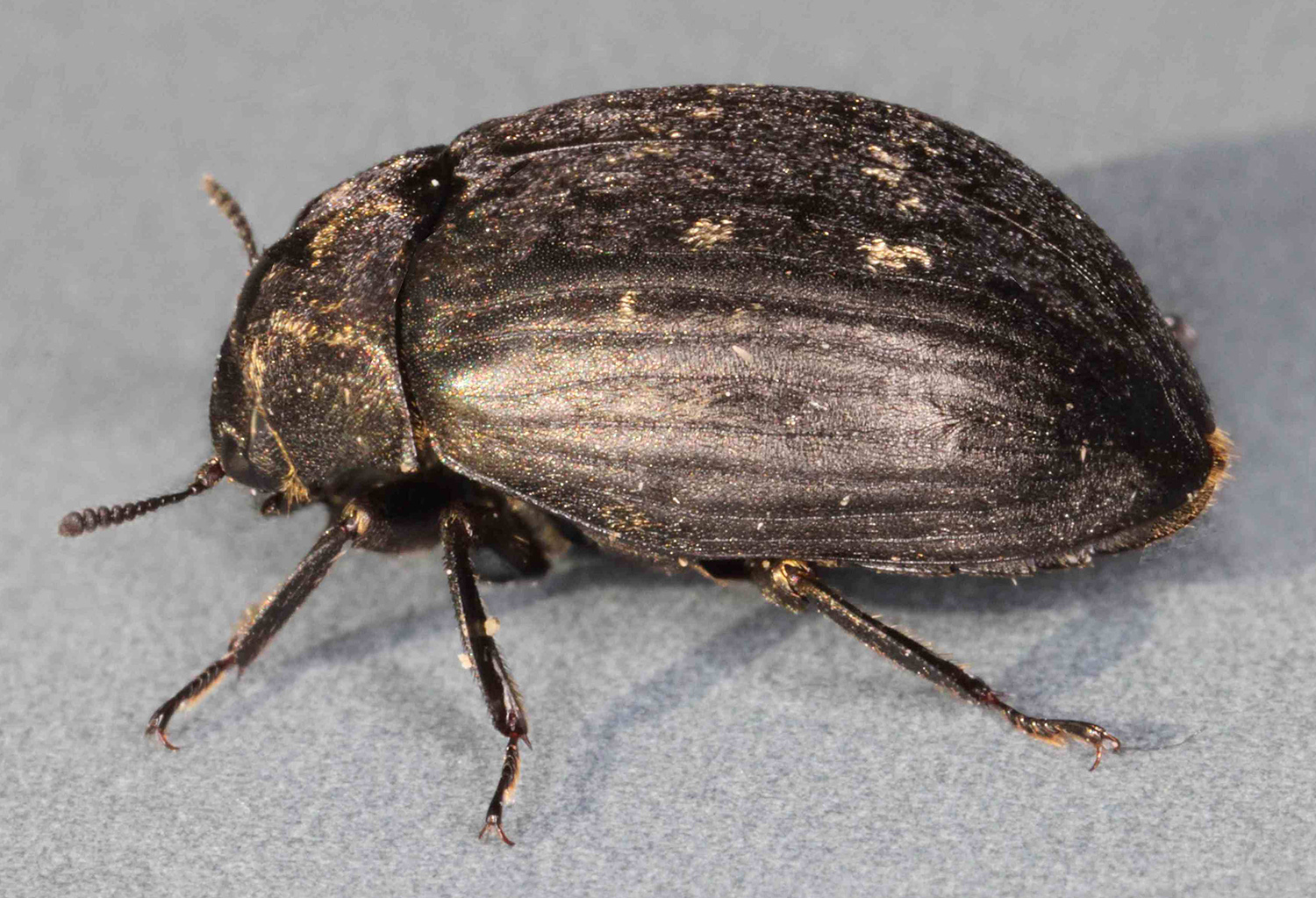

Scientific classification
- Kingdom: Animalia
- Phylum: Arthropoda
- Class: Insecta
- Order: Coleoptera
- Suborder: Polyphaga
- Infraorder: Elateriformia
- Family: Byrrhidae
- Genus: Byrrhus
- Species: B. pilula

Binomial name
- Byrrhus pilula (Linnaeus, 1758)

= Byrrhus pilula =

Species of beetle

Byrrhus pilula, the common pill beetle, is a Holarctic species of beetle in the family Byrrhidae. It was described by Carl Linnaeus in 1758.

== Description ==
The body is short and stout and brown with rows of dark and light brown markings on the elytra. Body length is 6.7 to 9.3 mm.

== Biology ==
Pill beetles can retract all their appendages into ventral body grooves-so feigning death and are then said to resemble or mimic a rabbit dropping or seed. Both larvae and adults feed on moss, algae and liverworts. Main habitats include moorland, heathland and sandy shorelines. They are found beneath logs and stones and at plant roots on damp, sandy or stony soils. They form part of the diet of the Red Kite in Wales and have been found in Kestrel and Little Owl pellets.

== Distribution ==
In the Palearctic from Ireland and Spain to Japan. In North America they are found in the Northern Territory of Canada.

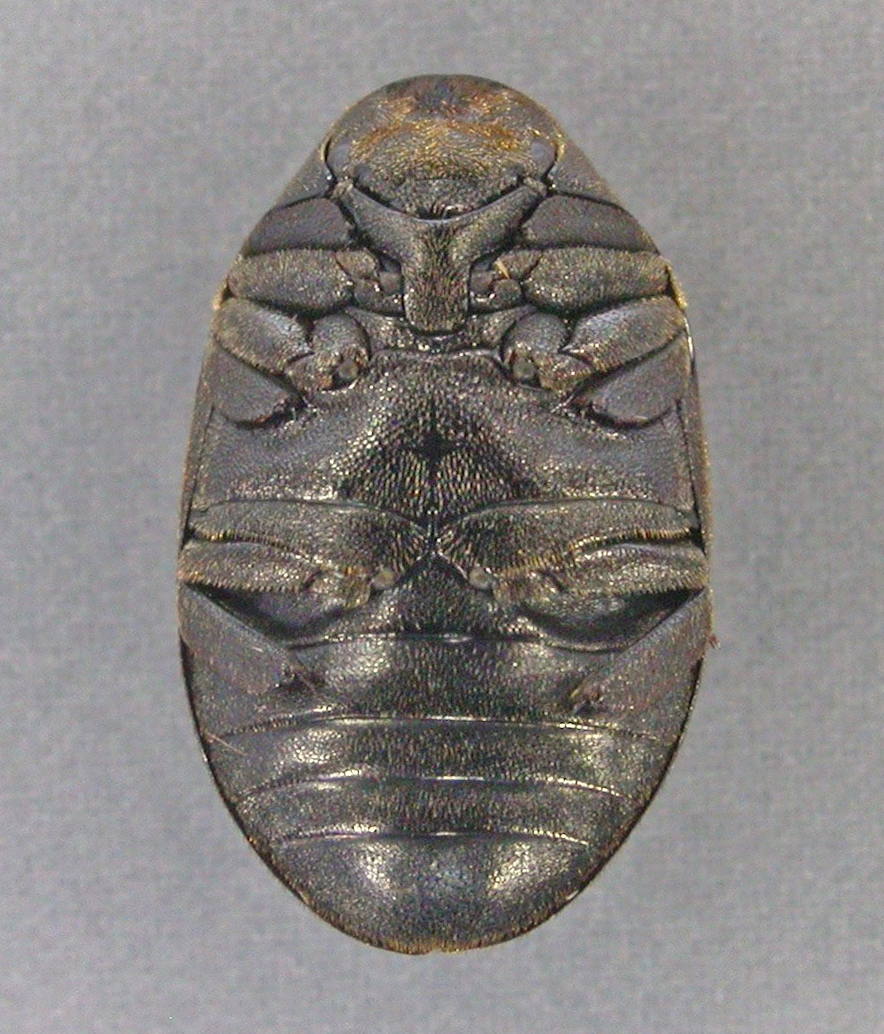
Ventral view showing retracted legs

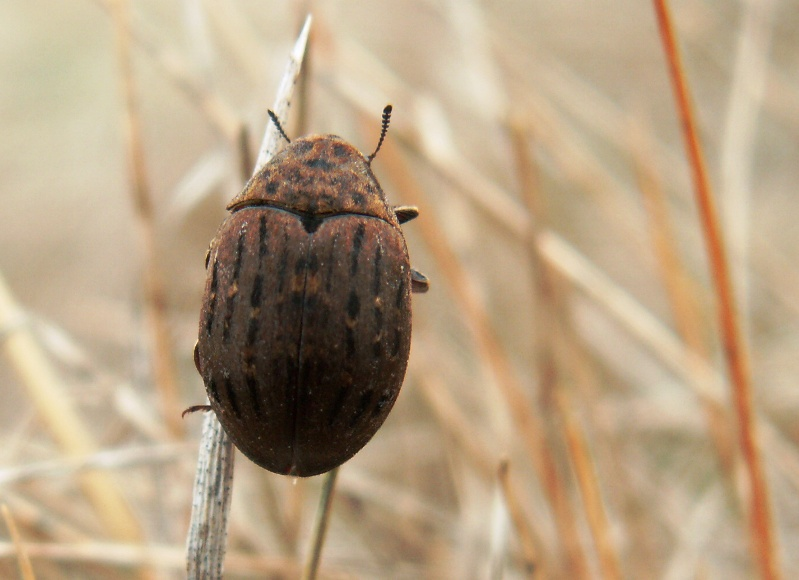
Habitus Netherlands
