= Exomella =

Scientific classification
- Kingdom: Animalia
- Phylum: Arthropoda
- Class: Insecta
- Order: Coleoptera
- Suborder: Polyphaga
- Infraorder: Elateriformia
- Family: Byrrhidae
- Subfamily: Byrrhinae
- Tribe: Simplocariini
- Genus: Exomella; Casey, 1914

Genus of beetles

Exomella is a genus of pill beetles in the family Byrrhidae. There are at least 2 described species in Exomella.

== Species ==
- Exomella merickeli Johnson, 1985
- Exomella pleuralis (Casey, 1908)
