= Copa annulata =

Scientific classification
- Kingdom: Animalia
- Phylum: Arthropoda
- Subphylum: Chelicerata
- Class: Arachnida
- Order: Araneae
- Infraorder: Araneomorphae
- Family: Corinnidae
- Genus: Copa
- Species: C. annulata

Binomial name
- Copa annulata Simon, 1896

Species of spider

Copa annulata is a species of spider in the family Corinnidae. It is endemic to Sri Lanka.
