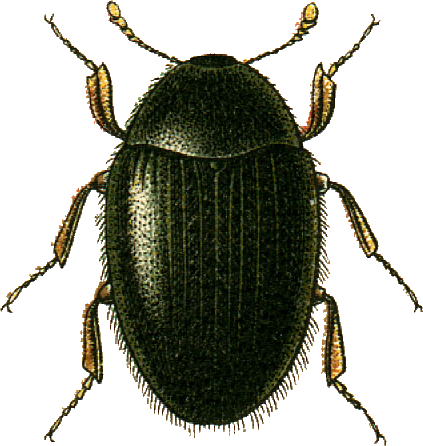

Scientific classification
- Domain: Eukaryota
- Kingdom: Animalia
- Phylum: Arthropoda
- Class: Insecta
- Order: Coleoptera
- Suborder: Polyphaga
- Infraorder: Elateriformia
- Family: Byrrhidae
- Genus: Simplocaria
- Species: S. semistriata

Binomial name
- Simplocaria semistriata (Fabricius, 1801)

= Simplocaria semistriata =

Species of beetle

Simplocaria semistriata is a species of pill beetle in the family Byrrhidae. It is found in Europe and Northern Asia (excluding China) and North America.

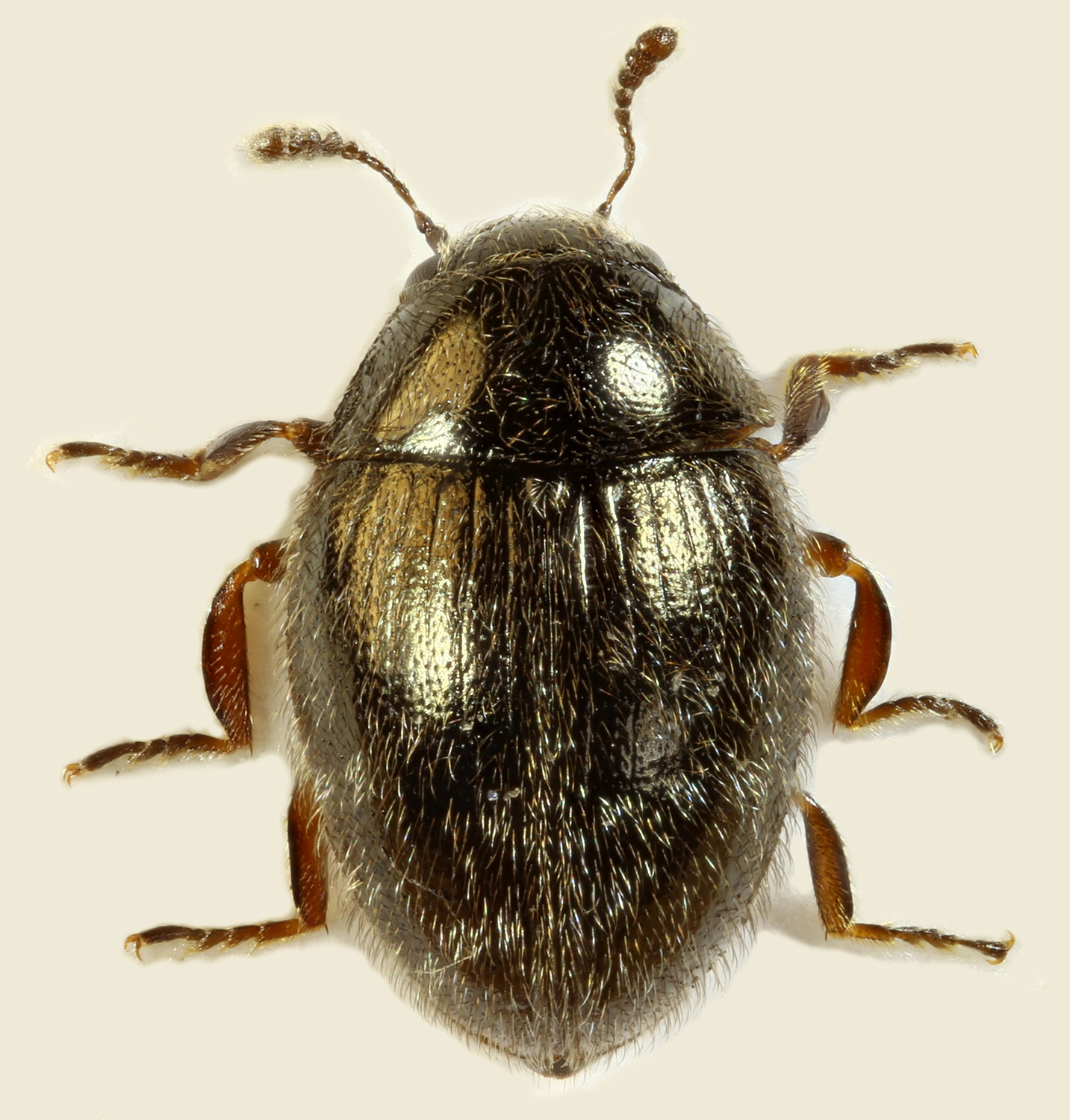

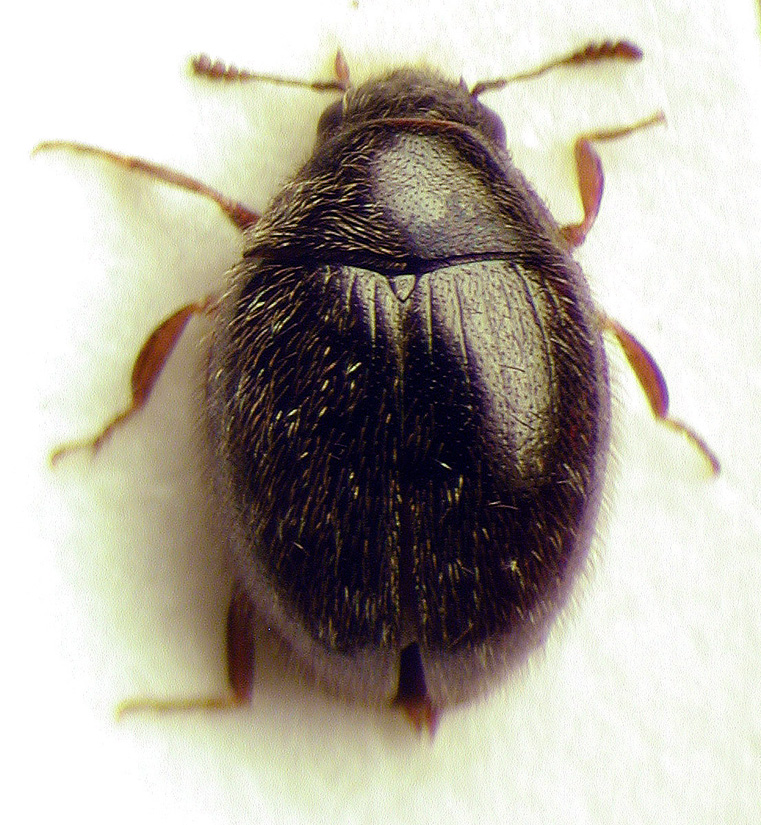
