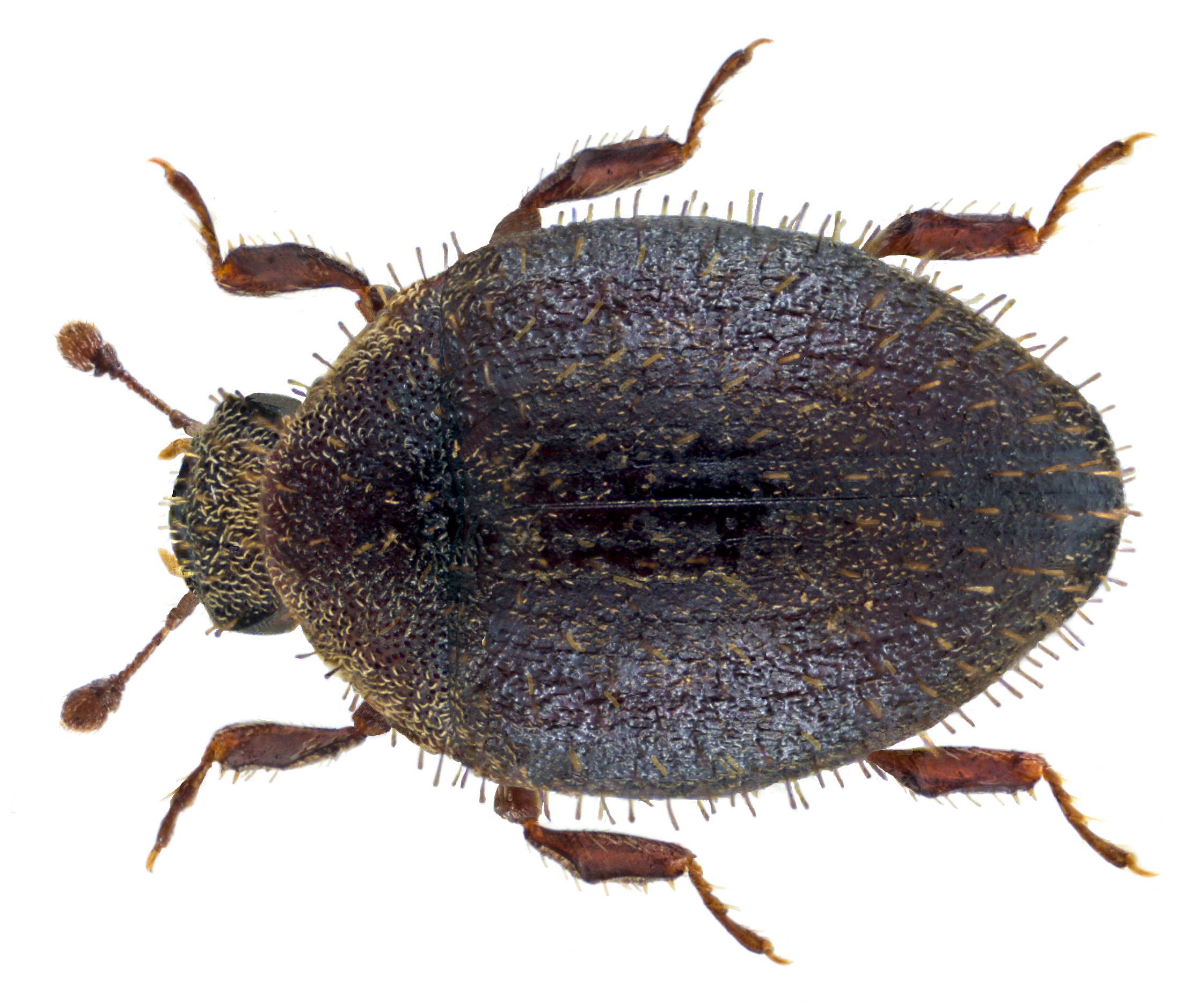
- Curimopsis maritima

Scientific classification
- Domain: Eukaryota
- Kingdom: Animalia
- Phylum: Arthropoda
- Class: Insecta
- Order: Coleoptera
- Suborder: Polyphaga
- Infraorder: Elateriformia
- Family: Byrrhidae
- Subfamily: Syncalyptinae
- Genus: Curimopsis; Ganglbauer, 1902

= Curimopsis =

Genus of beetles

Curimopsis is a genus of pill beetles in the family Byrrhidae. There are more than 30 described species in Curimopsis.

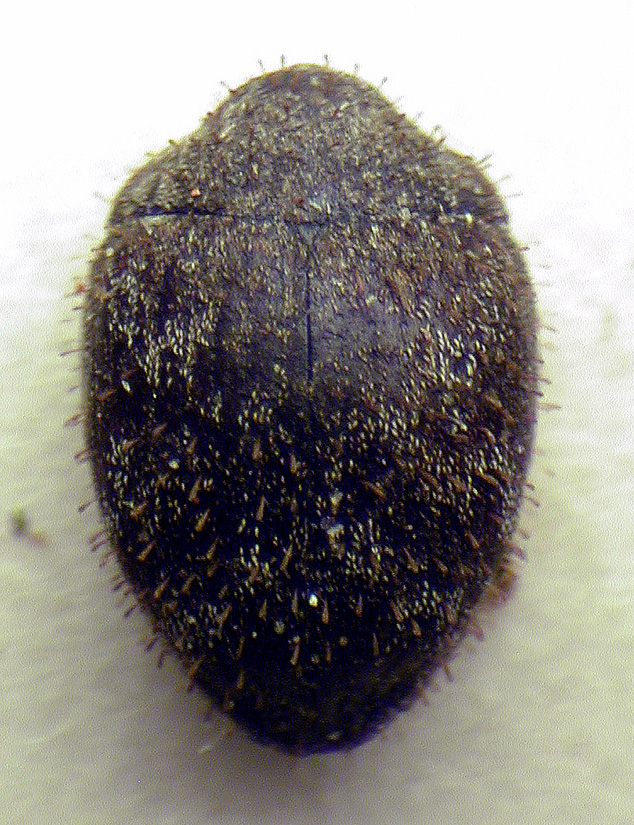
Curimopsis setigera

== Species ==
These 38 species belong to the genus Curimopsis:

- Curimopsis albonotata (LeConte, 1861)
- Curimopsis andalusiaca (Franz, 1967)
- Curimopsis austriaca (Franz, 1967)
- Curimopsis brancomontis Pütz, 2002
- Curimopsis brevicollis Casey
- Curimopsis canariensis (Franz, 1967)
- Curimopsis capitata (Wollaston, 1854)
- Curimopsis carniolica (Ganglbauer, 1902)
- Curimopsis cyclolepidia (Münster, 1902)
- Curimopsis echinata (LeConte, 1850)
- Curimopsis ehimensis Kitano & Sakai, 2006
- Curimopsis franzi Paulus, 1973
- Curimopsis ganglbaueri (Plavilshikov, 1924)
- Curimopsis granulosa (Wollaston, 1865)
- Curimopsis horrida (Wollaston, 1854)
- Curimopsis incisa (Obenberger, 1917)
- Curimopsis integra (Wollaston, 1864)
- Curimopsis italica (Franz, 1967)
- Curimopsis jordai (Reitter, 1910)
- Curimopsis madeirensis Pütz, 2002
- Curimopsis maritima (Marsham, 1802)
- Curimopsis monticola (Franz, 1967)
- Curimopsis moosilauke Johnson, 1986
- Curimopsis nigrita (Palm, 1934)
- Curimopsis ovuliformis (Wollaston, 1854)
- Curimopsis paleata (Erichson, 1846)
- Curimopsis palmi (Franz, 1967)
- Curimopsis provencalis (Franz, 1967)
- Curimopsis senicis Pütz, 2002
- Curimopsis setigera (Illiger, 1798)
- Curimopsis setulosa (Mannerheim, 1852)
- Curimopsis strigosa (Melsheimer, 1844)
- Curimopsis syriaca (Baudi, 1870)
- Curimopsis tenerifensis (Palm, 1976)
- Curimopsis tsurugisana Kitano, Pütz & Sakai, 2008
- Curimopsis vicentina Paulus, 1973
- Curimopsis wollastoni Pütz, 2002
- † Syncalypta albonotata (Le Conte, 1850)
