= Sierraclava =

Scientific classification
- Domain: Eukaryota
- Kingdom: Animalia
- Phylum: Arthropoda
- Class: Insecta
- Order: Coleoptera
- Suborder: Polyphaga
- Infraorder: Elateriformia
- Family: Byrrhidae
- Subfamily: Syncalyptinae
- Genus: Sierraclava; Johnson, 1982

Genus of beetles

Sierraclava is a genus of pill beetles in the family Byrrhidae. There is one described species in Sierraclava, S. cooperi.
