= Copa spinosa =

Scientific classification
- Kingdom: Animalia
- Phylum: Arthropoda
- Subphylum: Chelicerata
- Class: Arachnida
- Order: Araneae
- Infraorder: Araneomorphae
- Family: Corinnidae
- Genus: Copa
- Species: C. spinosa

Binomial name
- Copa spinosa Simon, 1896

Species of spider

Copa spinosa, is a species of spider of the genus Copa. It is endemic to Sri Lanka.
