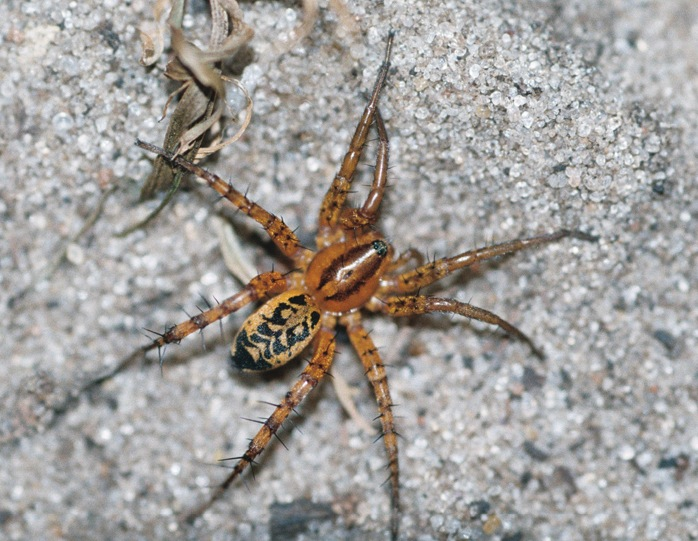
- Female
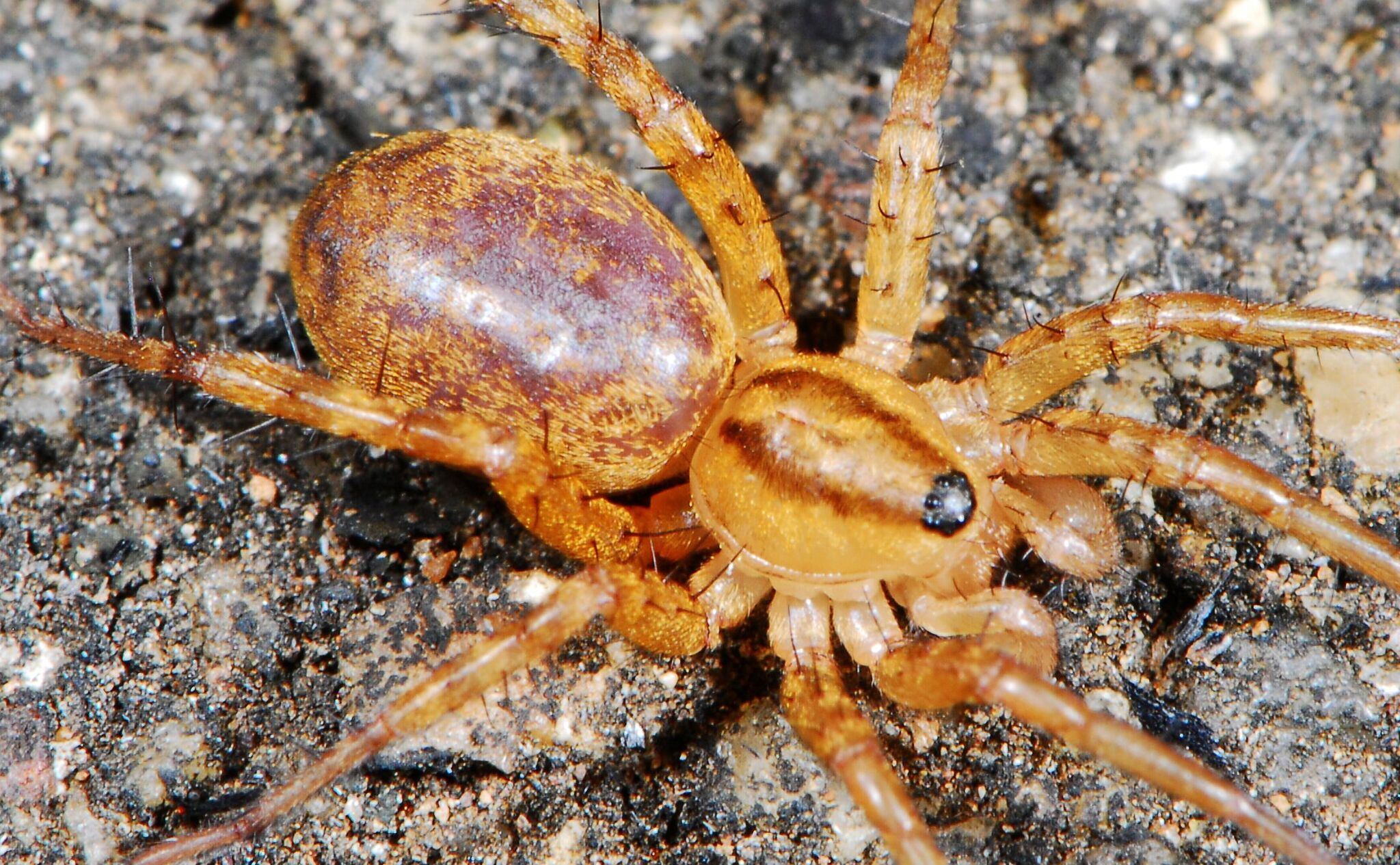
- Juvenile male

Scientific classification
- Kingdom: Animalia
- Phylum: Arthropoda
- Subphylum: Chelicerata
- Class: Arachnida
- Order: Araneae
- Infraorder: Araneomorphae
- Family: Corinnidae
- Genus: Copa
- Species: C. flavoplumosa

Binomial name
- Copa flavoplumosa Simon, 1886

Synonyms
- Copa benina Strand, 1916; Copa benina nigra Lessert, 1933

= Copa flavoplumosa =

African ground lycosiform sac spider

Species of spider

Copa flavoplumosa is a species of spider in the family Corinnidae. It is widely distributed throughout the Afrotropical Region and is commonly known as the African ground lycosiform sac spider.

== Etymology ==
The species name flavoplumosa is Latin for "yellow-feathered".

== Distribution ==
Copa flavoplumosa has a wide distribution throughout the Afrotropical Region. In South Africa, it occurs in all nine provinces at altitudes ranging from 6 to 2,102 m above sea level.

The species is recorded from numerous locations across South Africa, including protected areas such as Great Fish River Wetland Park, Mkambati Nature Reserve, Kruger National Park, iSimangaliso Wetland Park, and De Hoop Nature Reserve.

== Habitat and ecology ==
Copa flavoplumosa is a free-living ground-dweller mainly found in the leaf litter layer of most major biome types in Africa, except for true deserts and Karoo habitats. The species inhabits Grassland, Forest, Fynbos, and Savanna biomes.

The species has also been collected from agricultural areas including avocado, citrus, macadamia, and pistachio orchards, as well as strawberry fields, cotton fields, and maize crops. Adult females construct papery yellow-brown egg sacs approximately 10 millimeters in diameter inside curled dead leaves on the ground.

== Description ==
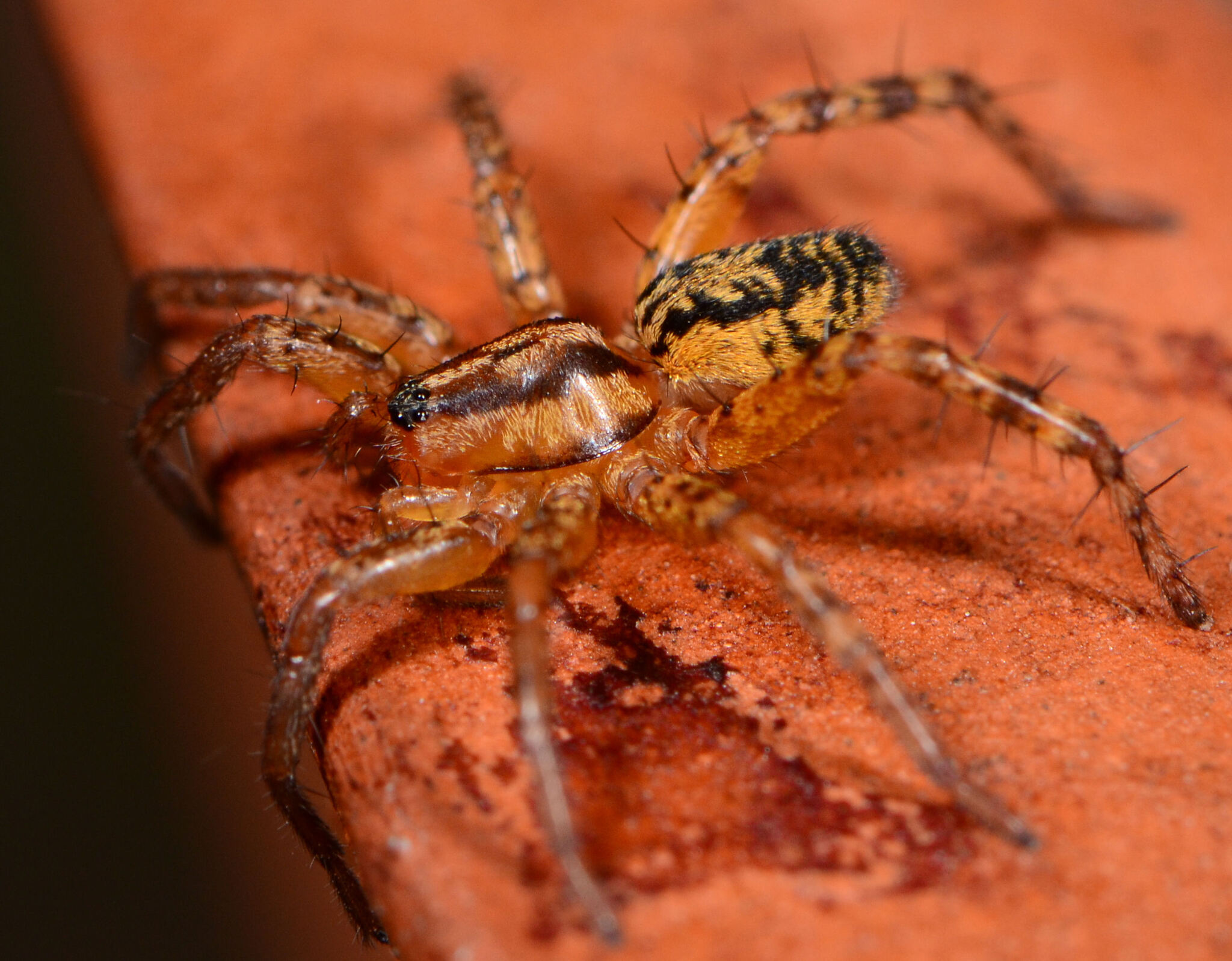
female

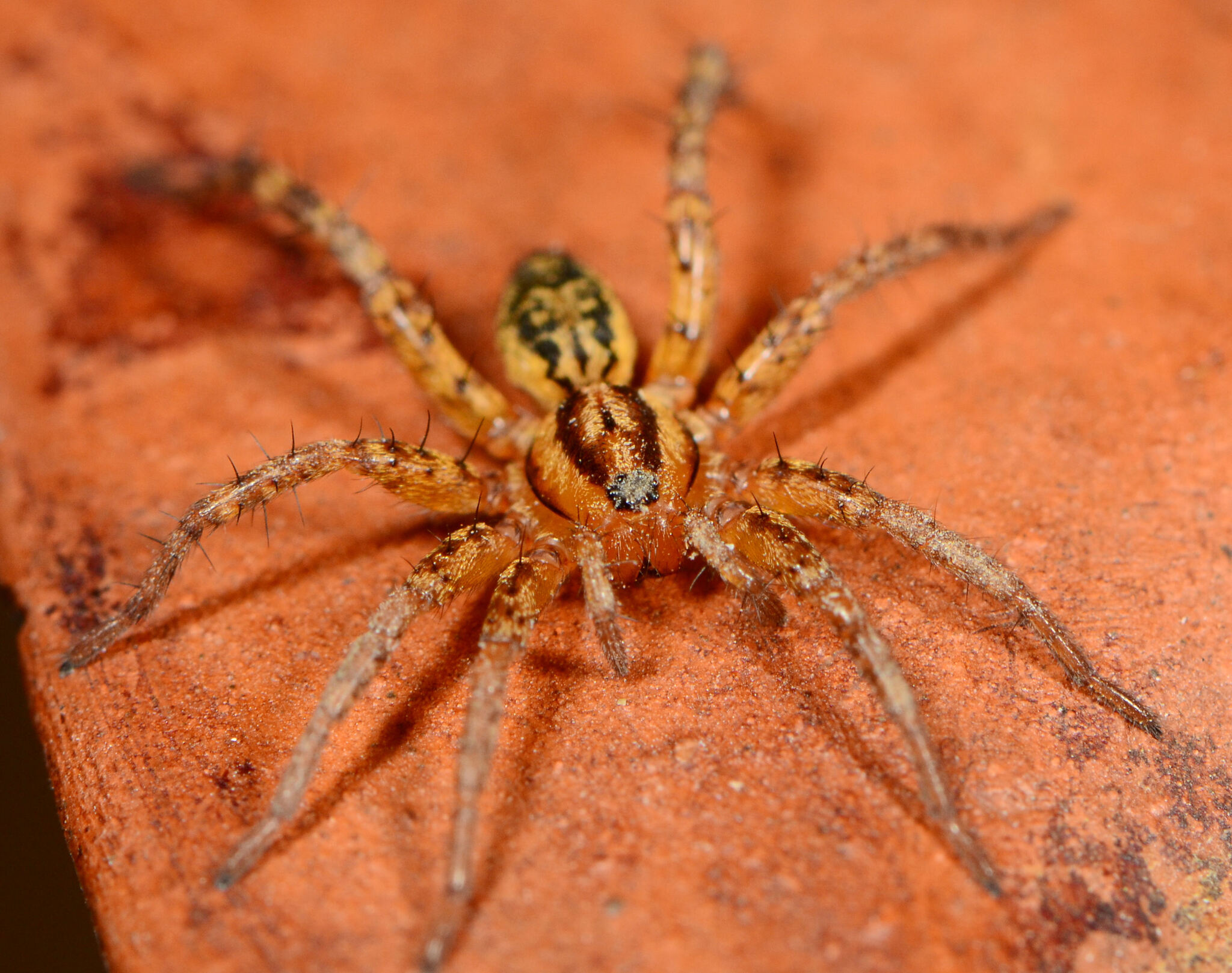
female

== Conservation ==
Copa flavoplumosa is listed as Least Concern by the South African National Biodiversity Institute due to its wide geographical range. The species faces no significant threats and is recorded from more than ten protected areas across South Africa.

== Taxonomy ==
The species was originally described by Eugène Simon in 1886. The continental African species of the genus Copa were revised by Charles R. Haddad in 2013, who synonymized Copa benina Strand, 1916 and Copa benina nigra Lessert, 1933 with C. flavoplumosa.
