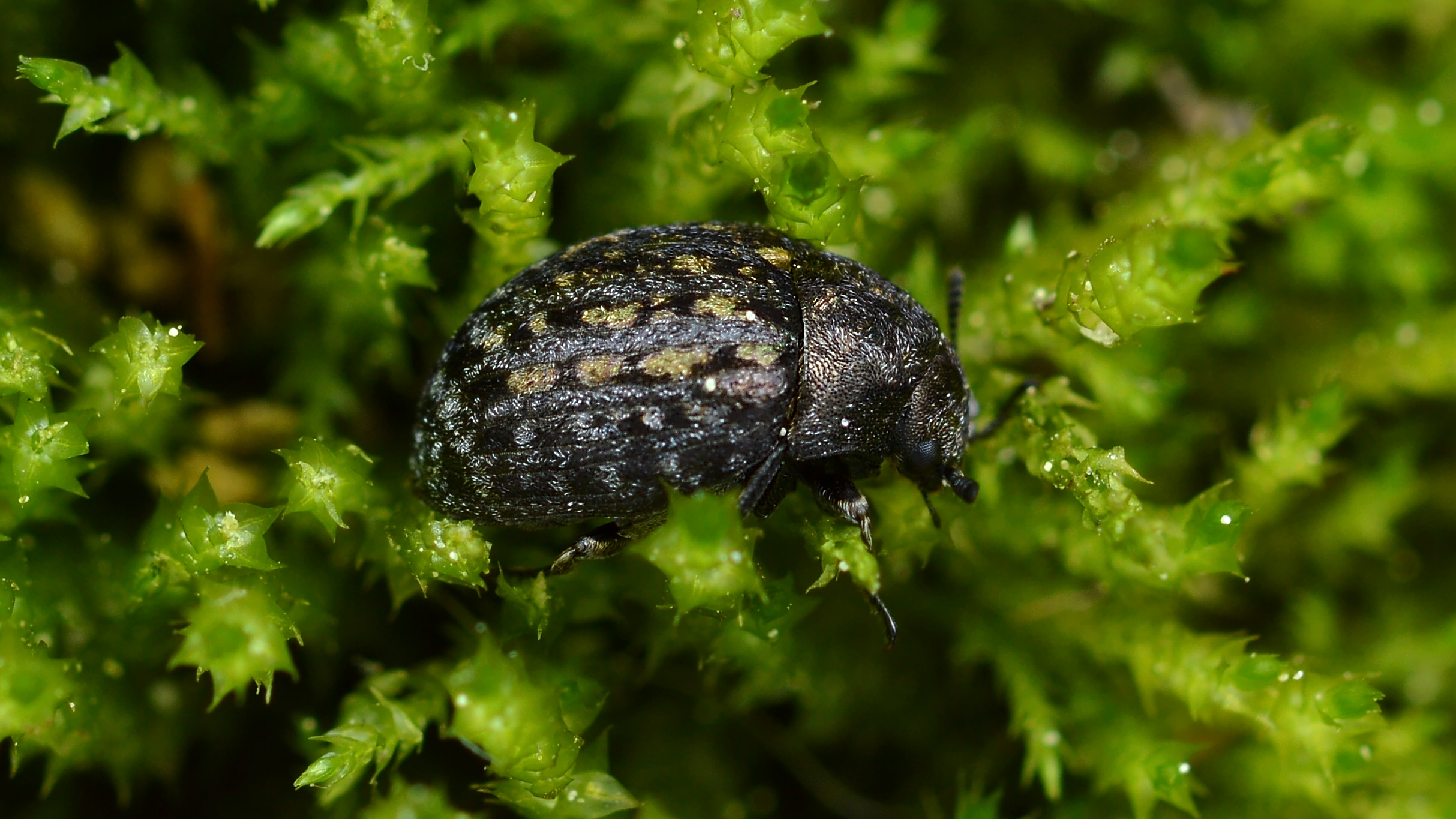

Scientific classification
- Kingdom: Animalia
- Phylum: Arthropoda
- Class: Insecta
- Order: Coleoptera
- Suborder: Polyphaga
- Infraorder: Elateriformia
- Family: Byrrhidae
- Tribe: Byrrhini
- Genus: Cytilus; Erichson, 1847

= Cytilus =

Genus of beetles

Cytilus is a genus of pill beetles in the family Byrrhidae. There are about eight described species in Cytilus.

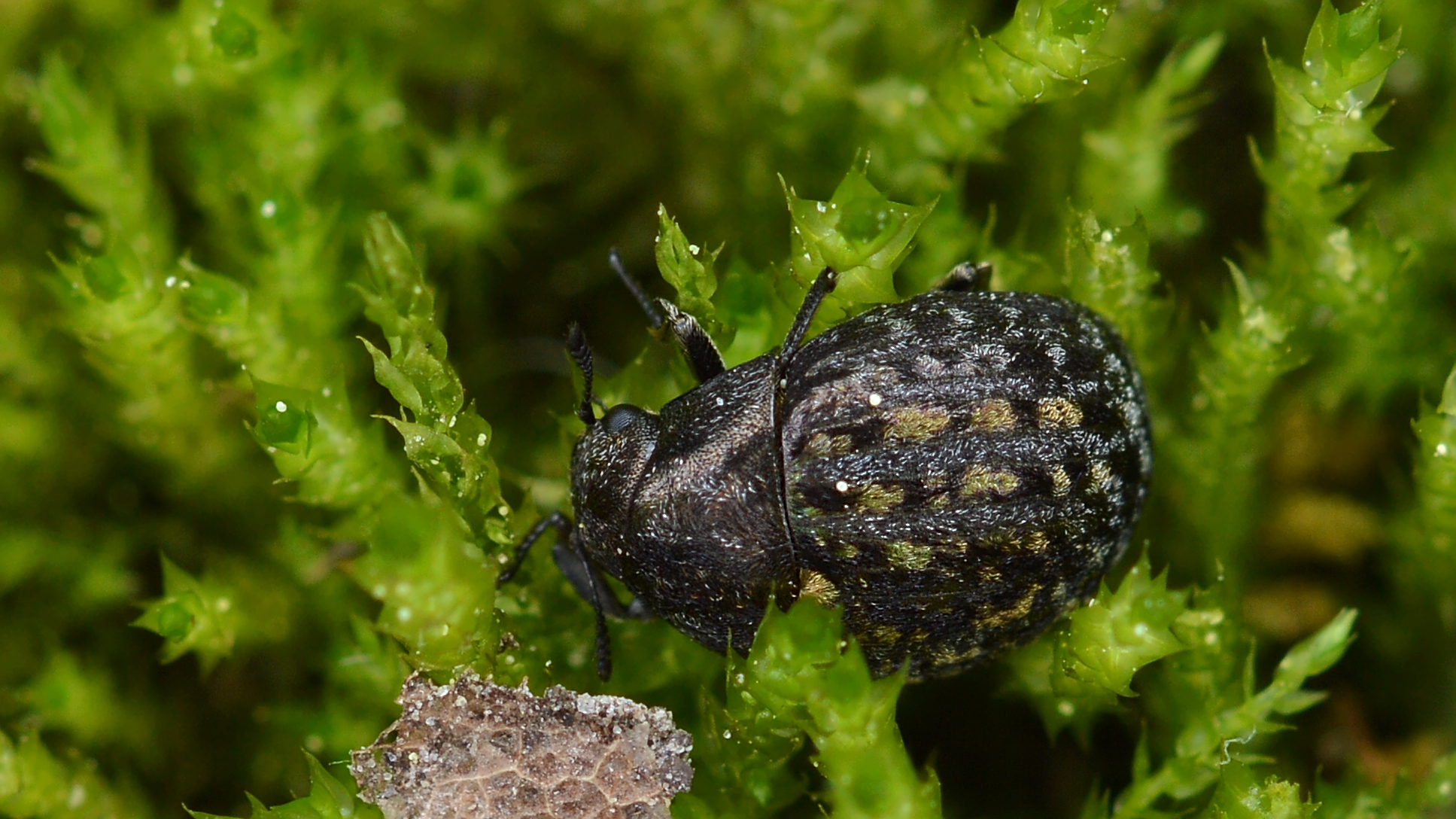

== Species ==
These eight species belong to the genus Cytilus:

- Cytilus alternatus (Say, 1825)
- Cytilus auricomus (Duftschmid, 1825)
- Cytilus kanoi Takizawa & Nakane, 1977
- Cytilus longulus Casey
- Cytilus mimicus Casey, 1912
- Cytilus nigrans Casey
- Cytilus sericeus (Forster, 1771)
- Cytilus tartarinus Scudder, 1900
