= Lioon =

Scientific classification
- Kingdom: Animalia
- Phylum: Arthropoda
- Class: Insecta
- Order: Coleoptera
- Suborder: Polyphaga
- Infraorder: Elateriformia
- Family: Byrrhidae
- Tribe: Simplocariini
- Genus: Lioon; Casey, 1912

Genus of beetles

Lioon is a genus of pill beetles in the family Byrrhidae. There are at least four described species in Lioon.

== Species ==
These four species belong to the genus Lioon:

- Lioon nezperce Johnson, 1991
- Lioon puncticeps Casey
- Lioon simplicipes (Mannerheim, 1852)
- Lioon speculare Casey
