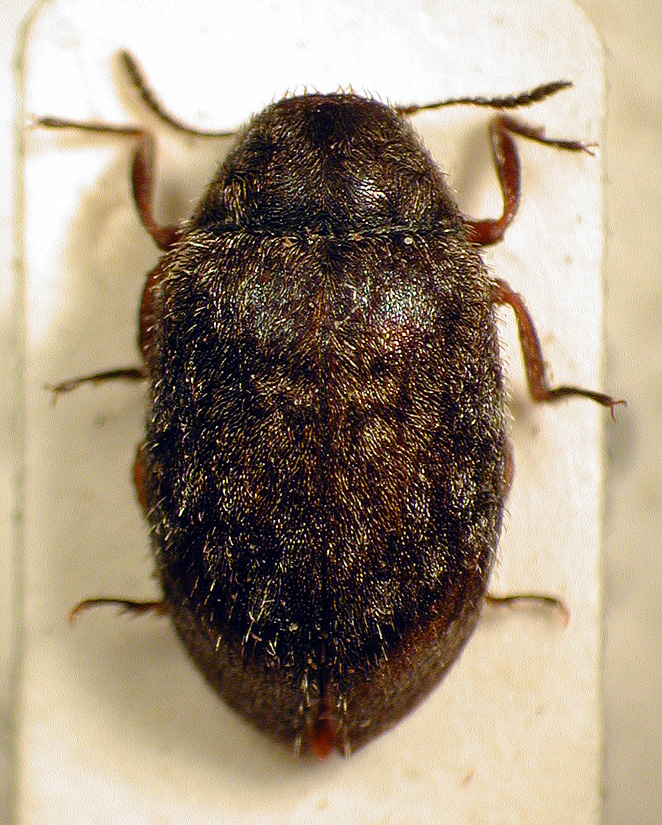
- Arctobyrrhus dovrensis

Scientific classification
- Domain: Eukaryota
- Kingdom: Animalia
- Phylum: Arthropoda
- Class: Insecta
- Order: Coleoptera
- Suborder: Polyphaga
- Infraorder: Elateriformia
- Family: Byrrhidae
- Tribe: Byrrhini
- Genus: Arctobyrrhus; Münster, 1902

Synonyms
- Tylicus Casey, 1912

= Arctobyrrhus =

Genus of beetles

Arctobyrrhus is a genus of pill beetles in the family Byrrhidae. There are at least two described species in Arctobyrrhus.

== Species ==
These two species belong to the genus Arctobyrrhus:

- Arctobyrrhus dovrensis Münster, 1902
- Arctobyrrhus subcanus (LeConte, 1878)
