= Listemus =

Scientific classification
- Domain: Eukaryota
- Kingdom: Animalia
- Phylum: Arthropoda
- Class: Insecta
- Order: Coleoptera
- Suborder: Polyphaga
- Infraorder: Elateriformia
- Family: Byrrhidae
- Tribe: Pedilophorini
- Genus: Listemus; Casey, 1912

Genus of beetles

Listemus is a genus of pill beetles in the family Byrrhidae. There are at least four described species in Listemus.

== Species ==
These four species belong to the genus Listemus:

- Listemus acuminatus (Mannerheim, 1852)
- Listemus formosus Casey, 1912
- Listemus kootenai Johnson, 1991
- Listemus satelles Casey
