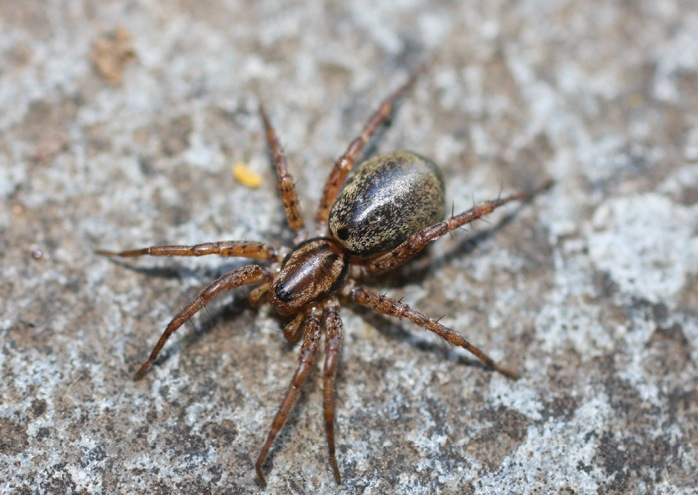
- Female Copa kei
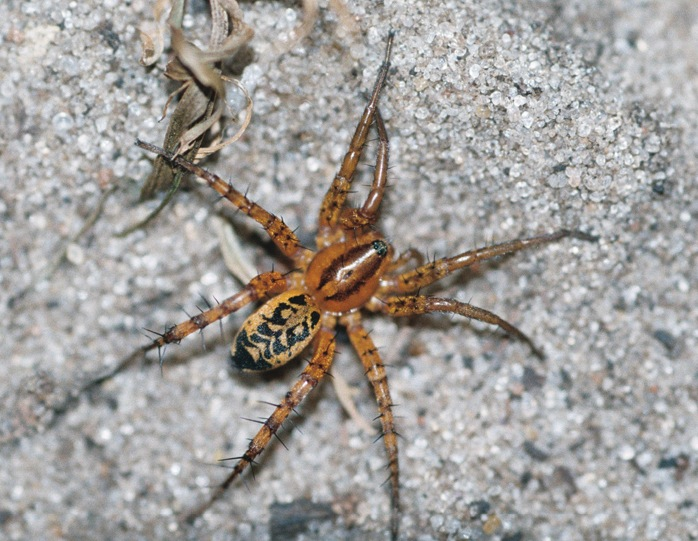
- Female C. flavoplumosa

Scientific classification
- Kingdom: Animalia
- Phylum: Arthropoda
- Subphylum: Chelicerata
- Class: Arachnida
- Order: Araneae
- Infraorder: Araneomorphae
- Family: Corinnidae
- Genus: Copa; Simon, 1886

Type species
- C. flavoplumosa Simon, 1886

Species
- 7, see text

= Copa (spider) =

Genus of spiders

Copa is a genus of corinnid sac spiders first described by Eugène Simon in 1886.

== Description ==
Copa are medium-sized spiders. The carapace is usually pale yellow to dark orange-brown with black markings, rarely black with white markings. The surface is smooth, with black feathery setae covering the markings. Several long curved setae are present on the clypeus, eye region, and posterior to the posterior eye row. The fovea is distinct and the posterior margin is very slightly concave or straight.

The oval opisthosoma is either yellow-orange with black markings or black with white markings. Three pairs of fine straight setae are present on the anterior margin above the pedicel. The dorsal scutum is small and strongly sclerotized, extending less than one-eighth of the abdomen length in females and slightly more than half the abdomen length in males.

The genus closely resembles wolf spiders (Lycosidae) in general appearance and is well camouflaged. They are very fast runners and often hide below leaves on the ground when coming to a halt.

== Species ==
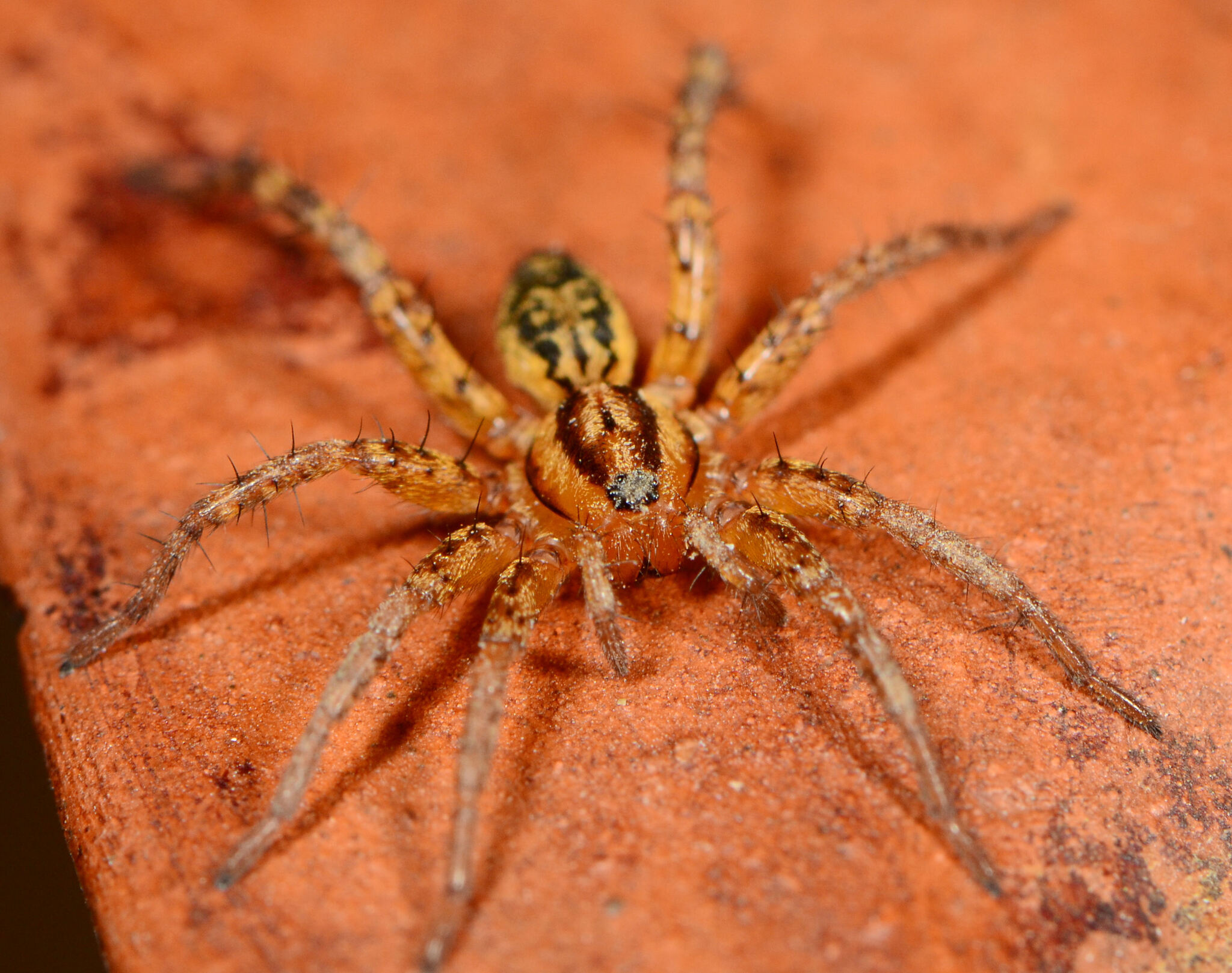
female C. flavoplumosa

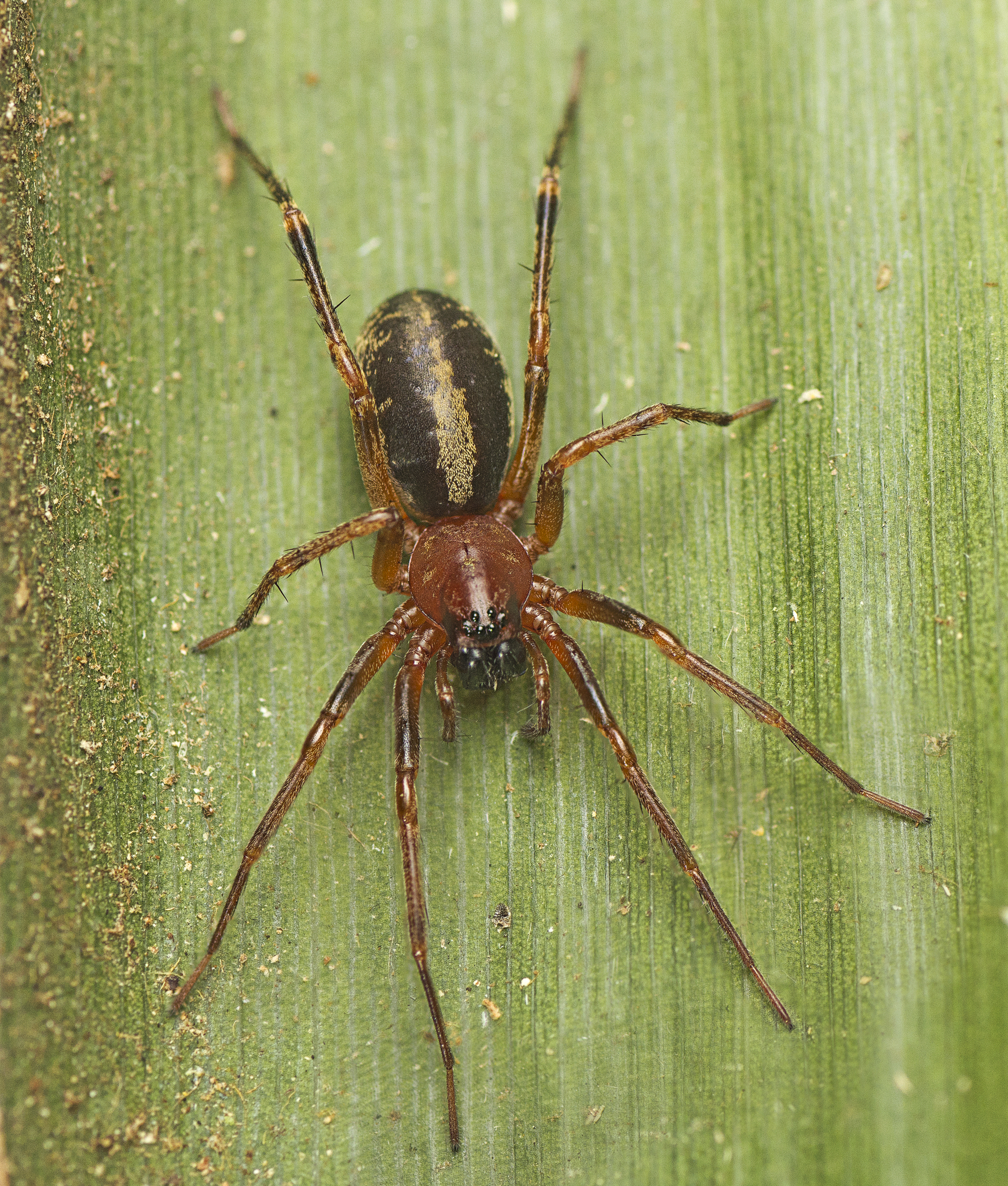
Copa kabana

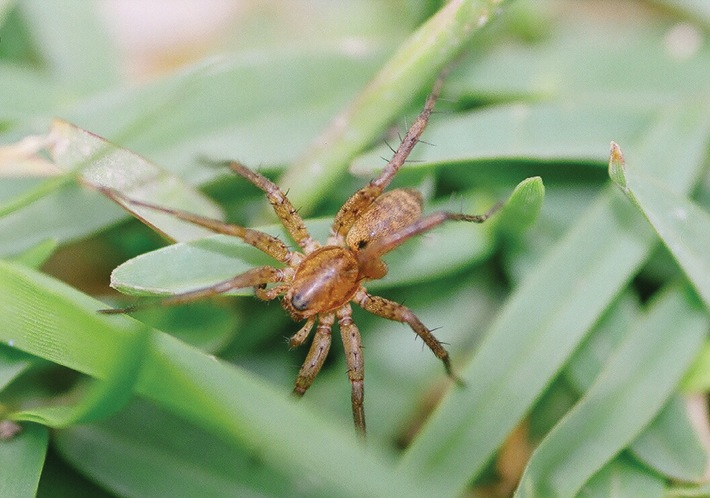
male C. kei

As of September 2025, the genus contains seven species in Asia, Africa, and Australia:

- Copa annulata Simon, 1896 – Sri Lanka
- Copa flavoplumosa Simon, 1886 (type) – West, Central, East, South Africa
- Copa kabana Raven, 2015 – Australia (Queensland, New South Wales)
- Copa kei Haddad, 2013 – South Africa
- Copa lineata Simon, 1903 – Madagascar
- Copa sakalava Pett, 2022 – Madagascar
- Copa spinosa Simon, 1896 – Sri Lanka
