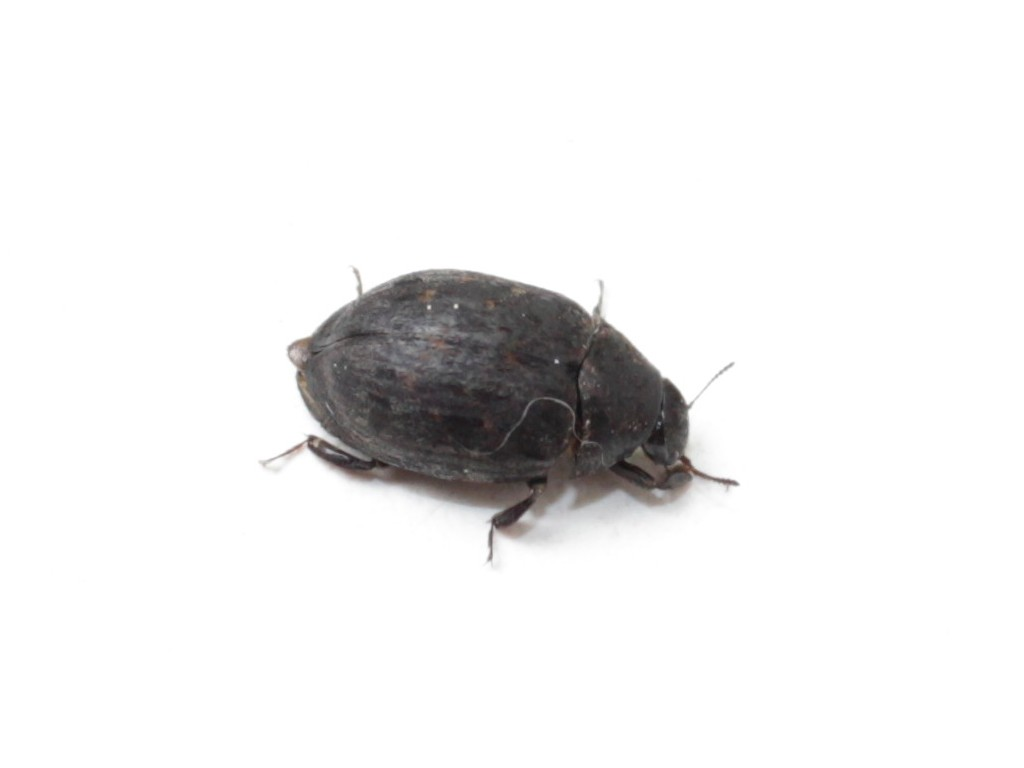
- Porcinolus

Scientific classification
- Domain: Eukaryota
- Kingdom: Animalia
- Phylum: Arthropoda
- Class: Insecta
- Order: Coleoptera
- Suborder: Polyphaga
- Infraorder: Elateriformia
- Family: Byrrhidae
- Tribe: Byrrhini
- Genus: Porcinolus; Mulsant, 1869

= Porcinolus =

Genus of beetles

Porcinolus is a genus of pill beetles in the family Byrrhidae. There are at least three described species in Porcinolus.

== Species ==
These three species belong to the genus Porcinolus:

- Porcinolus crescentifer Casey
- Porcinolus hystrix Casey
- Porcinolus undatus (Melsheimer, 1844)
