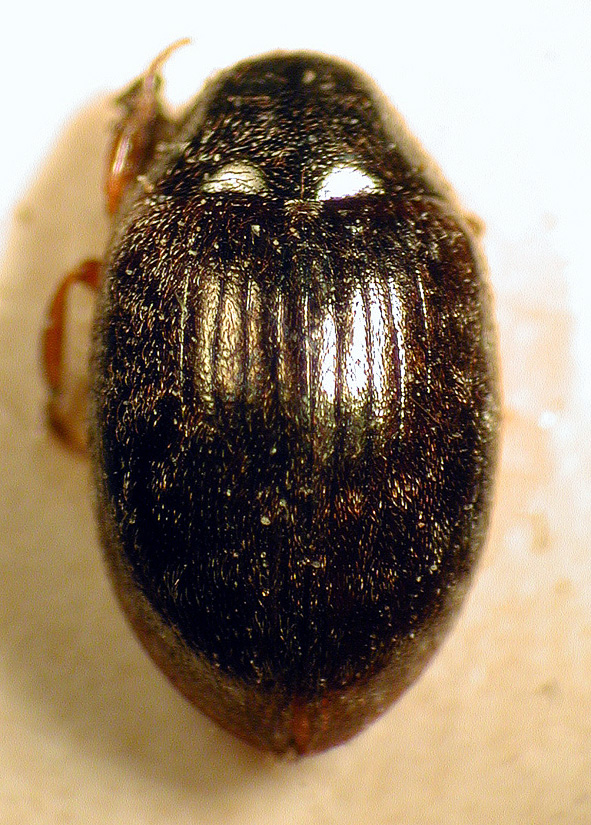
- Simplocaria metallica

Scientific classification
- Domain: Eukaryota
- Kingdom: Animalia
- Phylum: Arthropoda
- Class: Insecta
- Order: Coleoptera
- Suborder: Polyphaga
- Infraorder: Elateriformia
- Family: Byrrhidae
- Tribe: Simplocariini
- Genus: Simplocaria; Stephens, 1830

= Simplocaria =

Genus of beetles

Simplocaria is a genus of pill beetles in the family Byrrhidae. There are more than 30 described species in Simplocaria.

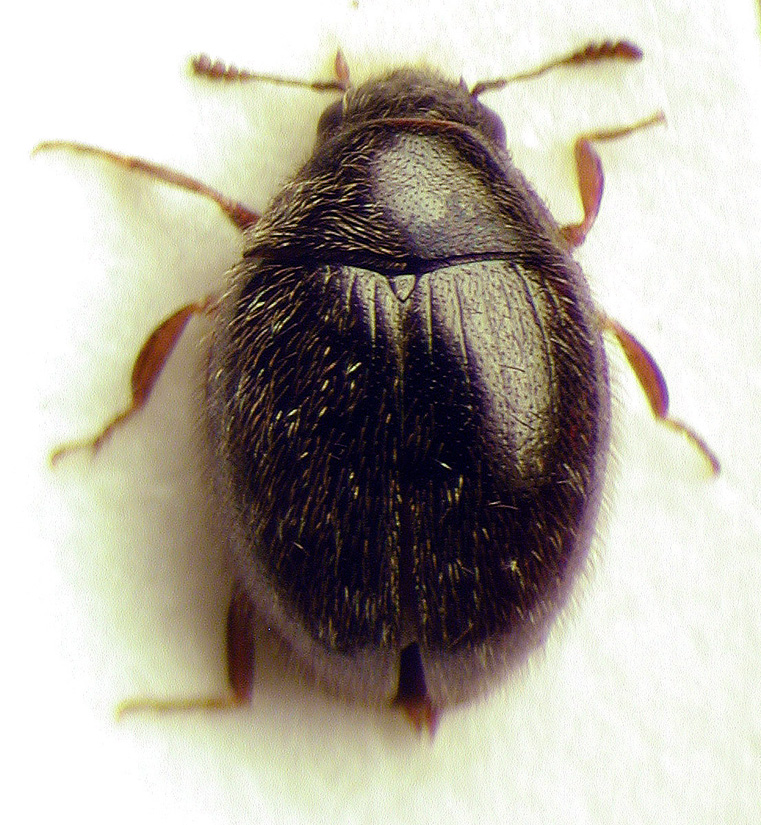
Simplocaria semistriata

== Species ==
These 31 species belong to the genus Simplocaria:

- Simplocaria acuminata Erichson, 1847
- Simplocaria arctica Poppius, 1904
- Simplocaria atayal Putz, 2003
- Simplocaria basalis Sahlberg, 1903
- Simplocaria brevistriata Reitter, 1900
- Simplocaria bunun Putz, 2003
- Simplocaria carpathica Hampe, 1853
- Simplocaria columbica Casey
- Simplocaria deubeli Ganglbauer, 1899
- Simplocaria elongata J. Sahlberg, 1903
- Simplocaria hakonensis Takizawa, 1983
- Simplocaria ivani Putz, 2003
- Simplocaria jugicola Baudi, 1889
- Simplocaria macularis Reitter, 1896
- Simplocaria maculosa Erichson, 1847
- Simplocaria metallica (Sturm, 1807)
- Simplocaria montenegrina Obenberger, 1917
- Simplocaria nenkaoshan Putz, 2003
- Simplocaria nivalis Ganglbauer, 1904
- Simplocaria paiwan Putz, 2003
- Simplocaria palmeni Poppius, 1904
- Simplocaria rukai Putz, 2003
- Simplocaria saysiat Putz, 2003
- Simplocaria semistriata (Fabricius, 1801)
- Simplocaria shikokensis Takizawa, 1983
- Simplocaria smetanai Putz, 2003
- Simplocaria striata C.Brisout de Barneville, 1866
- Simplocaria subnuda Casey
- Simplocaria taiwanica Putz, 2003
- Simplocaria taroko Putz, 2003
- Simplocaria tsou Putz, 2003
