= Eusomalia =

Scientific classification
- Kingdom: Animalia
- Phylum: Arthropoda
- Class: Insecta
- Order: Coleoptera
- Suborder: Polyphaga
- Infraorder: Elateriformia
- Family: Byrrhidae
- Tribe: Pedilophorini
- Genus: Eusomalia; Casey, 1912

Genus of beetles

Eusomalia is a genus of pill beetles in the family Byrrhidae. There is one described species in Eusomalia, E. lecontei.
