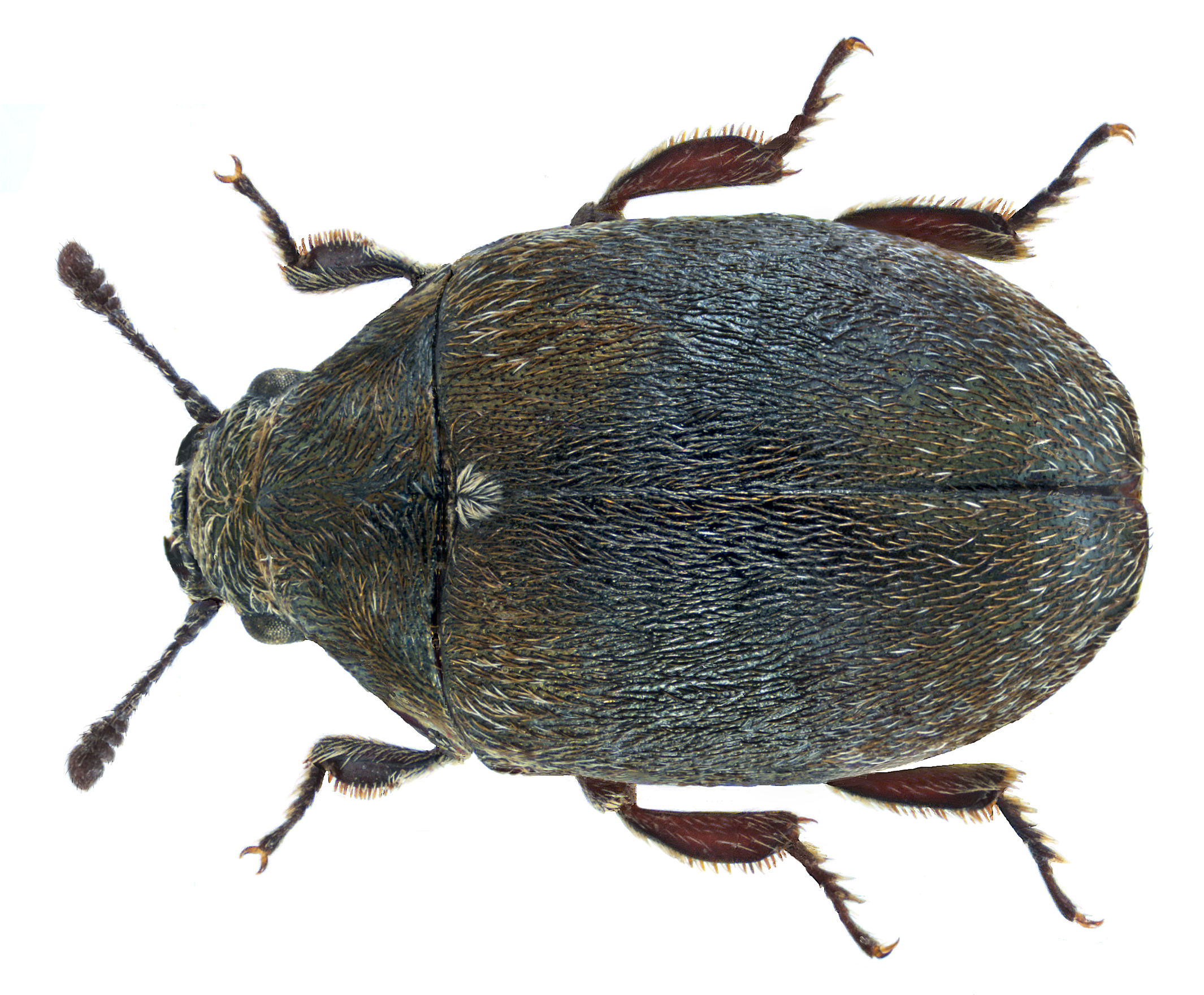
- Morychus aeneus

Scientific classification
- Kingdom: Animalia
- Phylum: Arthropoda
- Class: Insecta
- Order: Coleoptera
- Suborder: Polyphaga
- Infraorder: Elateriformia
- Family: Byrrhidae
- Tribe: Pedilophorini
- Genus: Morychus; Erichson, 1847

= Morychus (beetle) =

Genus of beetles

Morychus is a genus of pill beetles in the family Byrrhidae. There are at least three described species in Morychus.

== Species ==
These three species belong to the genus Morychus:

- Morychus aeneolus (LeConte, 1863)^{i c g b}
- Morychus aeneus (Fabricius, 1775)^{g}
- Morychus oblongus (LeConte, 1857)^{i c g b}

Data sources: i = ITIS, c = Catalogue of Life, g = GBIF, b = Bugguide.net
