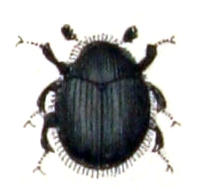
- Chaetophora spinosa

Scientific classification
- Kingdom: Animalia
- Phylum: Arthropoda
- Class: Insecta
- Order: Coleoptera
- Suborder: Polyphaga
- Infraorder: Elateriformia
- Family: Byrrhidae
- Subfamily: Syncalyptinae
- Genus: Chaetophora

Species
- Chaetophora spinosa (Rossi, 1794)

= Chaetophora (beetle) =

Genus of beetles

Chaetophora is a genus in the family Byrrhidae, the pill beetles.
