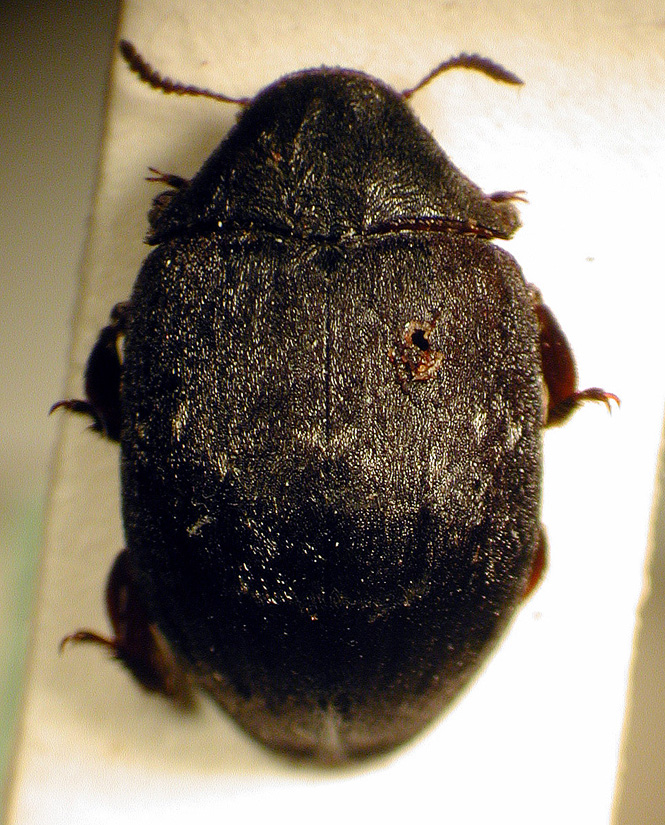
- Byrrhus arietinus

Scientific classification
- Domain: Eukaryota
- Kingdom: Animalia
- Phylum: Arthropoda
- Class: Insecta
- Order: Coleoptera
- Suborder: Polyphaga
- Infraorder: Elateriformia
- Family: Byrrhidae
- Tribe: Byrrhini
- Genus: Byrrhus; Linnaeus, 1767

= Byrrhus =

Genus of beetles

Byrrhus is a genus of pill beetles in the family Byrrhidae. There are at least 30 described species in Byrrhus.

The correct date for this genus is 1767 (#195), as it was not listed in 1758. B. pilula (Linnaeus, 1758) was listed under the genus Dermestes in the 10th edition (#18).

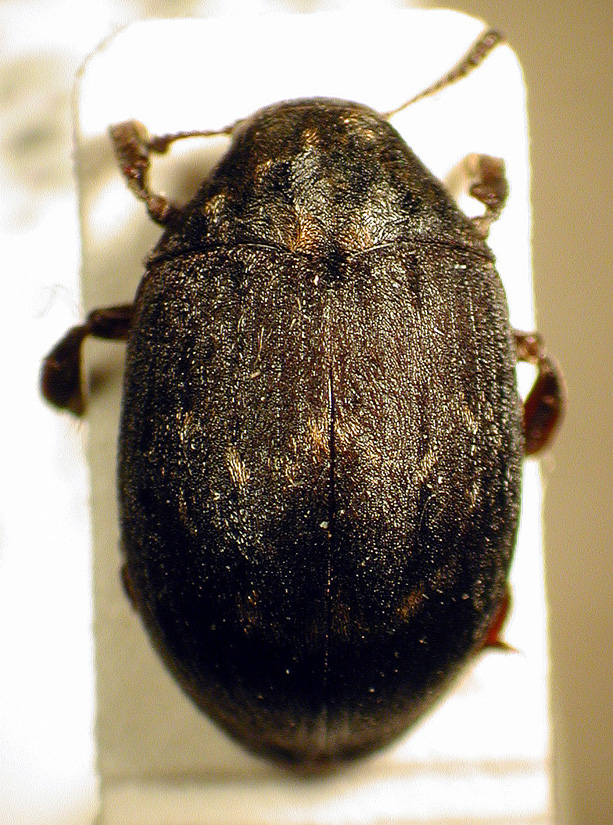
Byrrhus pustulatus

== Species ==
These 32 species belong to the genus Byrrhus:

- Byrrhus alpinus Gory, 1829^{g}
- Byrrhus americanus LeConte, 1850^{i c g b}
- Byrrhus arietinus Steffahny, 1842^{g}
- Byrrhus auromicans Kiesenwetter, 1851^{g}
- Byrrhus concolor Kirby, 1837^{i c g b}
- Byrrhus crenulatus Rossi, 1794^{g}
- Byrrhus cyclophorus Kirby, 1837^{i c g b}
- Byrrhus derrei Allemand, 1987^{g}
- Byrrhus espanoli G.Fiori, 1960^{g}
- Byrrhus eximius LeConte, 1850^{i c g b}
- Byrrhus fasciatus Forster, 1771^{i c g}
- Byrrhus focarilei Fabbri & Puetz, 1997^{g}
- Byrrhus geminatus LeConte, 1854^{i c g b}
- Byrrhus gigas Fabricius, 1787^{g}
- Byrrhus glabratus Heer, 1841^{g}
- Byrrhus kirbyi LeConte, 1854^{i c g b}
- Byrrhus lisellae (G.Fiori, 1953)^{g}
- Byrrhus luniger Germar, 1817^{g}
- Byrrhus murinus Fabricius, 1794^{g}
- Byrrhus nicolasi G.Fiori, 1966^{g}
- Byrrhus nigrosparsus Chevrolat, 1866^{g}
- Byrrhus numidicus Normand, 1935^{g}
- Byrrhus occidentalis G.Fiori, 1953^{g}
- Byrrhus picipes Duftschmid, 1825^{g}
- Byrrhus pilosellus A.Villa & G.B.Villa, 1833^{g}
- Byrrhus pilula (Linnaeus, 1758)^{i c g b}
- Byrrhus pustulatus (Forster, 1771)^{g}
- Byrrhus pyrenaeus Dufour, 1834^{g}
- Byrrhus rubidus Kugelann, 1792^{g}
- Byrrhus rufipes Kugelann, 1792^{g}
- Byrrhus signatus Sturm, 1823^{g}
- Byrrhus undulatus Kugelann, 1792^{g}

Data sources: i = ITIS, c = Catalogue of Life, g = GBIF, b = Bugguide.net
