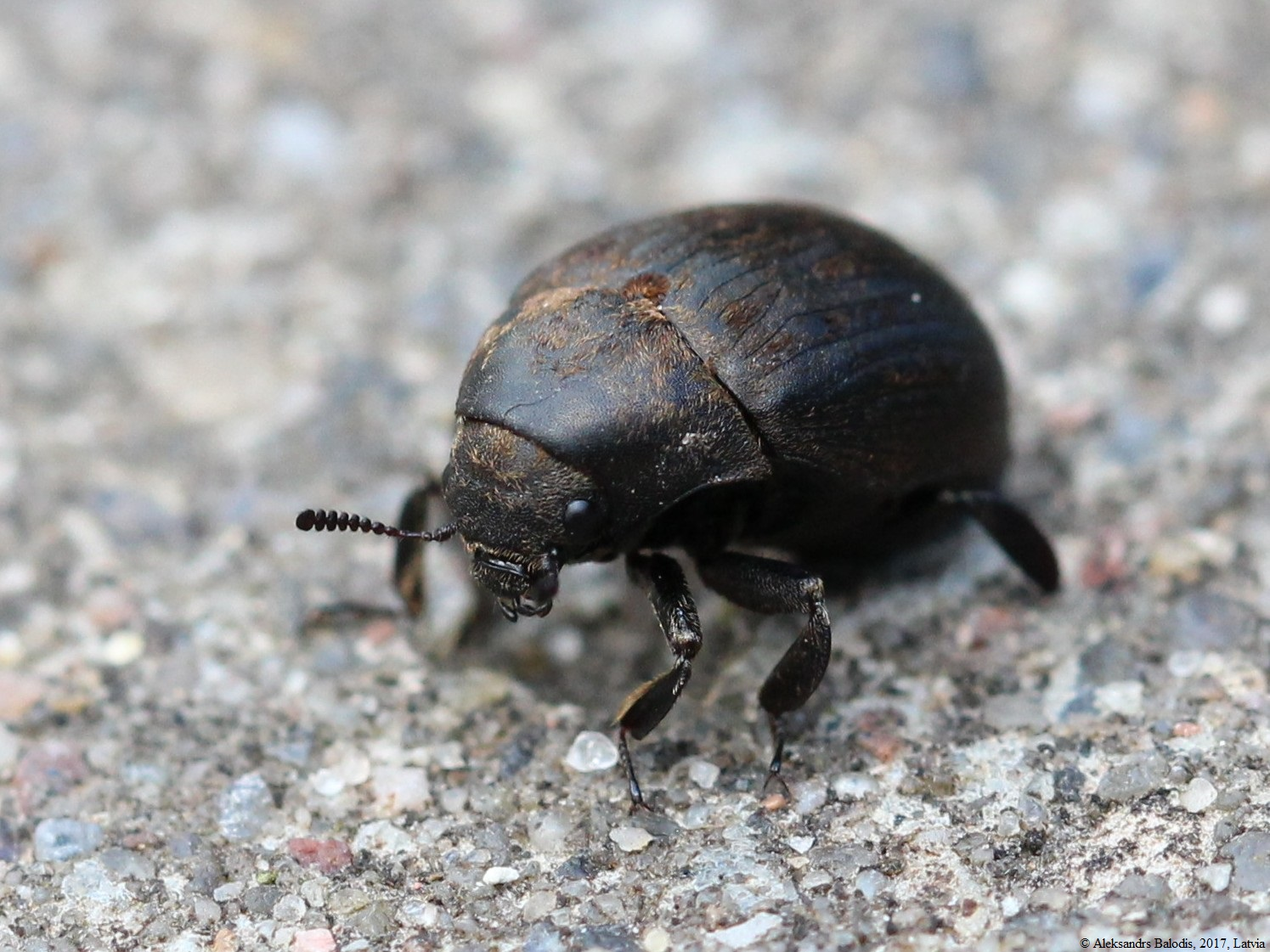
- Byrrhus pilula

Scientific classification
- Kingdom: Animalia
- Phylum: Arthropoda
- Clade: Pancrustacea
- Class: Insecta
- Order: Coleoptera
- Suborder: Polyphaga
- Infraorder: Elateriformia
- Superfamily: Byrrhoidea
- Family: Byrrhidae; Latreille, 1804

Subfamilies
- Amphicyrtinae; Byrrhinee; Syncalyptinae

= Byrrhidae =

Byrrhidae Temporal range: Albian–Recent

Family of beetles

Byrrhidae, the pill beetles, is a family of beetles in the superfamily Byrrhoidea. They are generally found in damp habitats within cooler-high latitude regions of both hemispheres. Most byrrhids feed on moss, lichens and algae, though some species feed on vascular plants. The oldest undoubted record of the family is Lidryops from the earliest Late Cretaceous Charentese amber of France, with other less certain records going back to the Middle Jurassic, but these possibly belong to Byrrhoidea. There around 500 extant species in 40 genera.

== Environment ==
Byrrhidae are known to thrive best in disturbed environments, specifically post-fire environments. The population increase of byrrhids in fire-ridden areas has led some to use them as an indicator of the magnitude of disturbances.

== Taxonomy ==
There are about 450 species in this family.

Genera include:

- Amphycyrta
- Arctobyrrhus
- Byrrhus
- Chaetophora
- Curimopsis
- Cytilus
- Eusomalia
- Exomella
- Lioligus
- Lioon
- Listemus
- Morychus
- Porcinolus
- Sierraclava
- Simplocaria

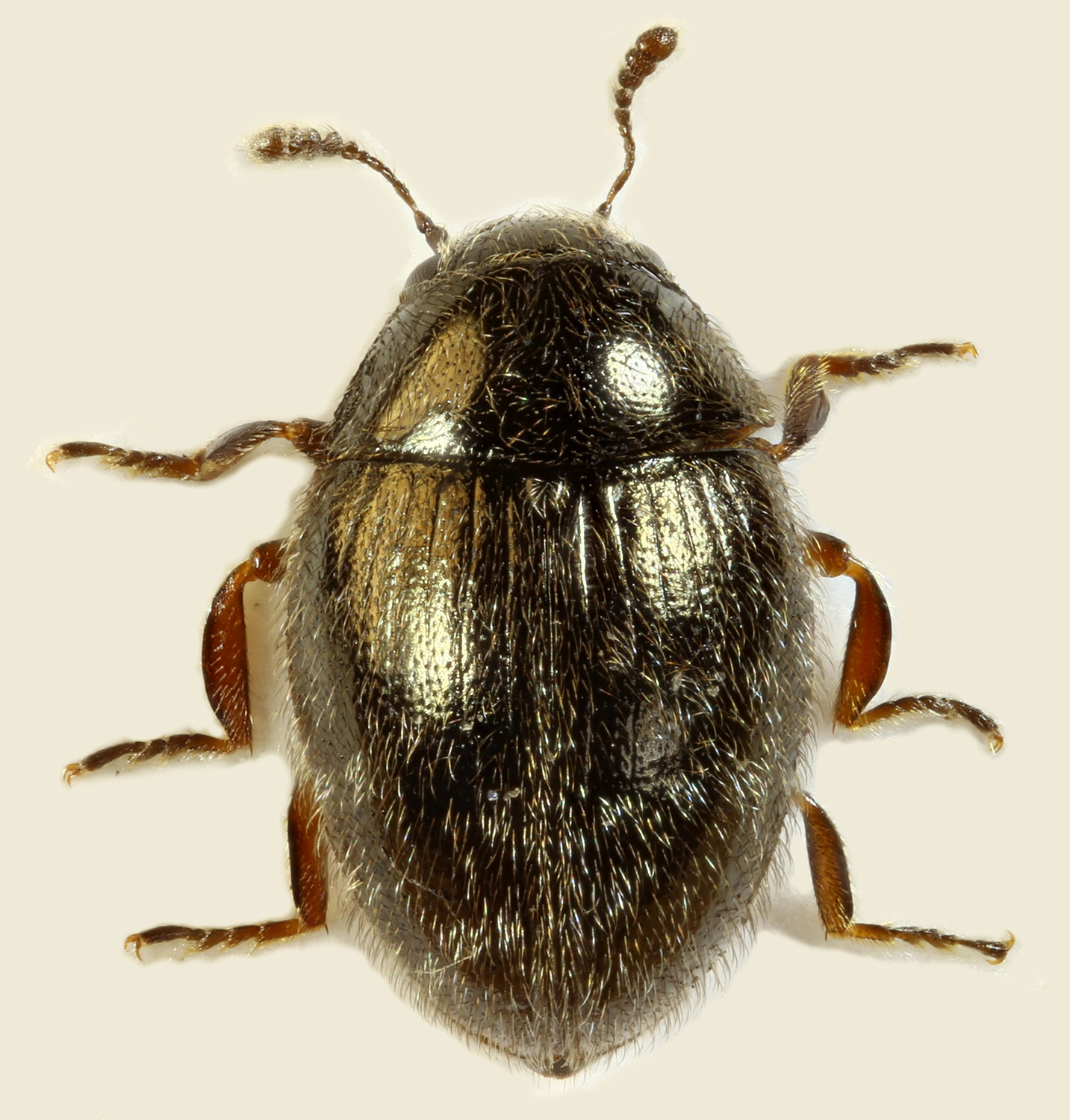
Simplocaria semistriata
