= List of the prehistoric life of Pennsylvania =

This list of the prehistoric life of Pennsylvania contains the various prehistoric life-forms whose fossilized remains have been reported from within the US state of Pennsylvania.

== Precambrian ==
The Paleobiology Database records no known occurrences of Precambrian fossils in Pennsylvania.

== Paleozoic ==
=== Selected Paleozoic taxa of Pennsylvania ===
- †Acidaspis
- †Agnostus
- †Alethopteris
- †Amphiscapha
- †Aphthoroblattina
- †Archaeopteris
  - †Archaeopteris halliana
  - †Archaeopteris macilenta
- †Archimylacris
- †Asaphiscus
- †Athyris
  - †Athyris spiriferoides
- †Atrypa
  - †Atrypa reticularis
- †Aviculopecten
  - †Aviculopecten occidentalis
- †Barinophyton
- †Bathyuriscus
- †Bellerophon
- †Bembexia
- †Beyrichoceratoides
- †Blattoidea
- †Bonneterrina
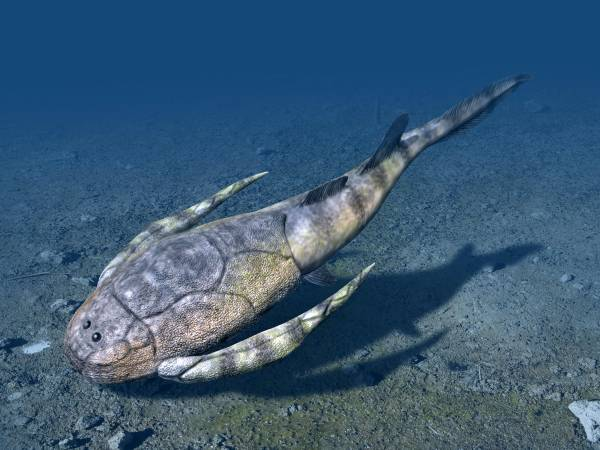
- Life restoration of the Late Devonian placoderm fish Bothriolepis
  †Bothriolepis
- †Byronia
- †Callixylon
- †Camarotoechia
- †Camptostroma
- †Cavusgnathus
- †Ceramopora
- †Ceratopsis
- †Chancelloria
- †Chancia
- †Chonetes
- †Cincinnetina
  - †Cincinnetina multisecta
- †Cleiothyridina
- †Climacograptus
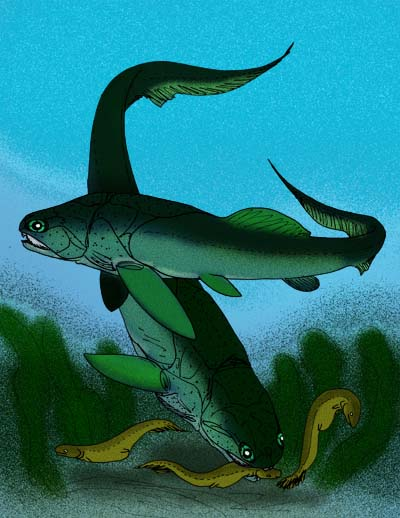
- Coccosteus cuspidatus restoration, shown attacking multiple Palaeospondylus'
  †Coccosteus
- †Coelacanthus
- †Composita
  - †Composita subtilita
- †Conotheca
- †Coosella
- †Coosia
- †Cordaites
- †Cornulites
  - †Cornulites flexuosus
- †Craniops
- †Crepicephalus
- †Ctenerpeton – type locality for genus
- †Ctenopterus
- †Cyclonema
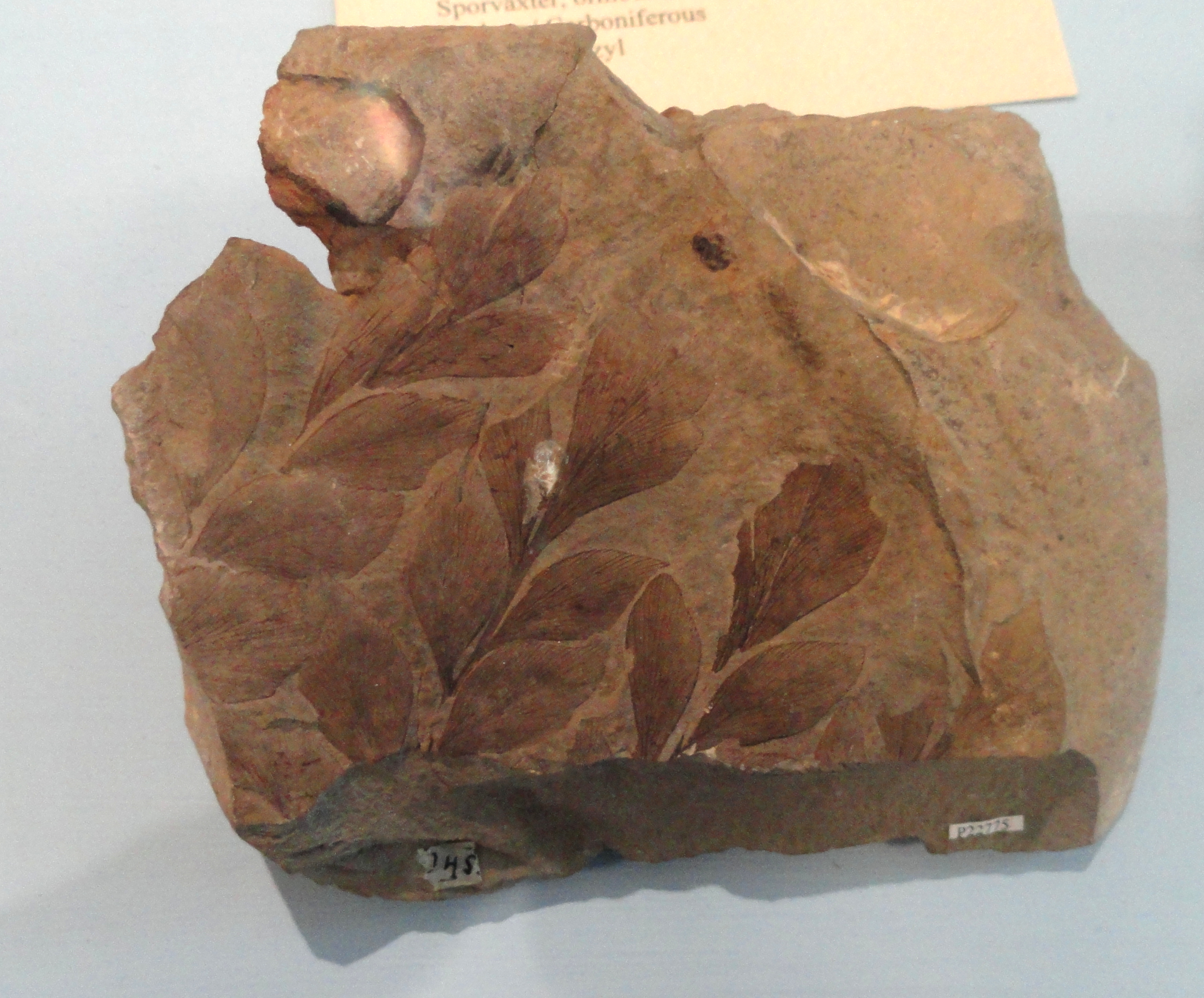
- Fossilized foliage from the Carboniferous seed fern Cyclopteris
  †Cyclopteris
- †Cypricardinia
  - †Cypricardinia indenta
- †Cyrtospirifer
- †Dawsonia
- †Deckera
- †Densignathus – type locality for genus
- †Diplocaulus – or unidentified comparable form
- †Diploceraspis
  - †Diploceraspis burkei
- †Diplograptus
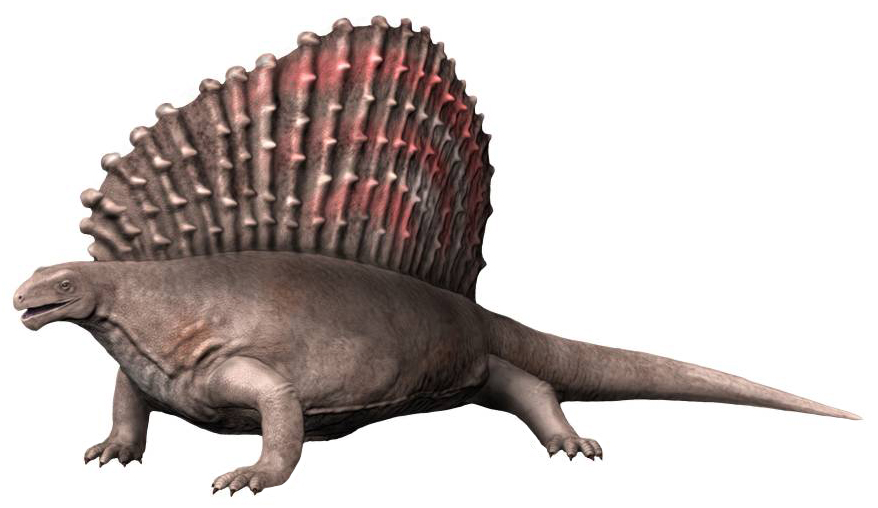
- Life restoration of the Permian synapsid (mammal precursor) Edaphosaurus
  †Edaphosaurus
- †Edmondia
- †Eldredgeops
  - †Eldredgeops rana
- †Elita
- †Elrathia
- †Elrathina
- †Endolobus
- †Eoagnostus
- †Erettopterus
- †Eryops
- †Esmeraldina
- †Euomphalus
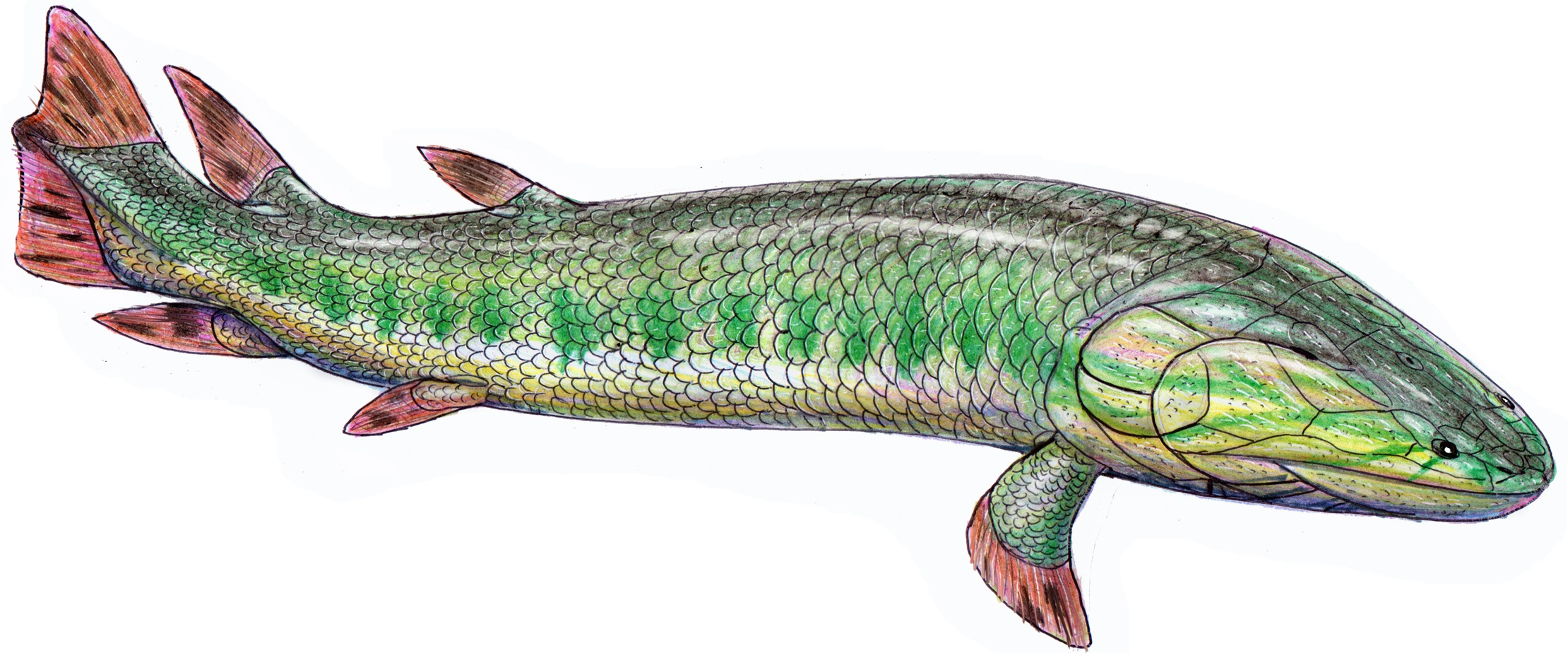
- Life restoration of the Devonian lobe-finned fish Eusthenodon
  †Eusthenodon
  - E. bourdoni – type locality for species
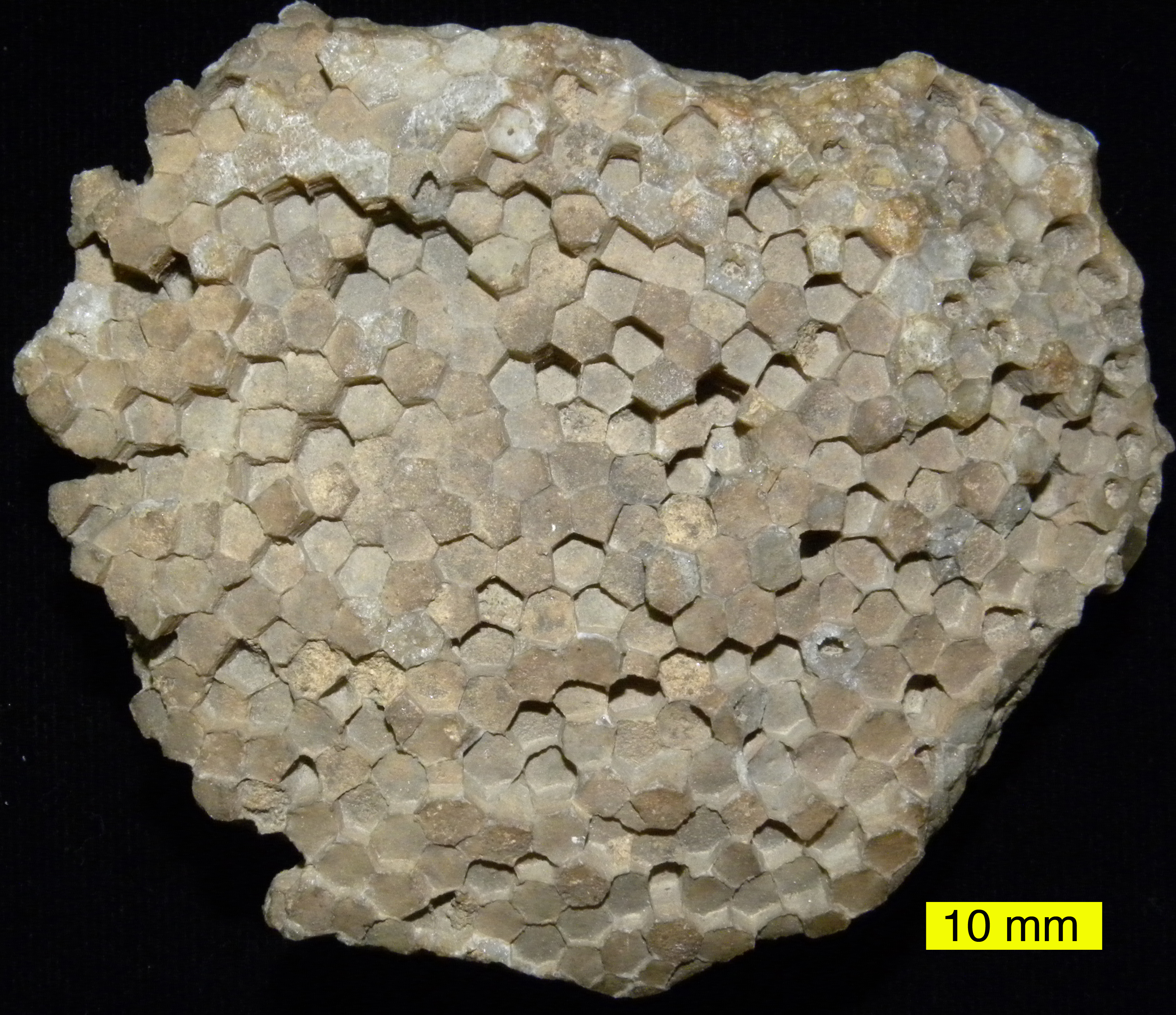
- Fossil of the Late Ordovician-Permian tabulate coral Favosites
  †Favosites
  - †Favosites niagarensis
- †Fenestella
- †Ganorhynchus
- †Genevievella
- †Glaukerpeton – type locality for genus
- †Glyptocrinus
- †Gnathodus
- †Gravicalymene
- †Greenops
- †Hallipterus
- †Hardieopterus
- †Hazelia
- †Helcionella
- †Hexactinellid
- †Hindeodus
- †Holonema
- †Holopea
- †Holoptychius
- †Holoptychus
- †Hughmilleria
- †Hymenocaris
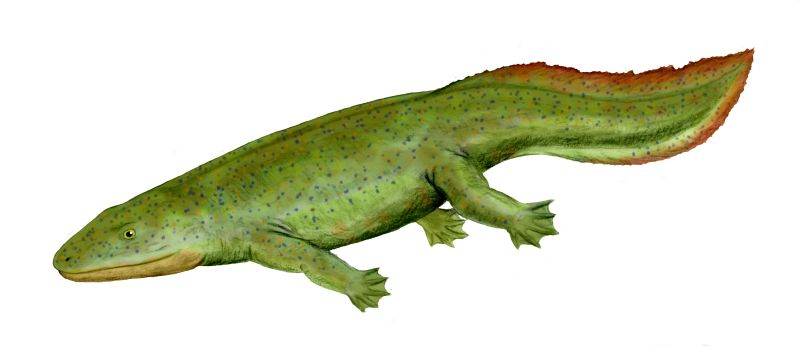
- Life restoration of the Late Devonian four-limbed animal precursor Hynerpeton
  †Hynerpeton – type locality for genus
  - †Hynerpeton bassetti – type locality for species
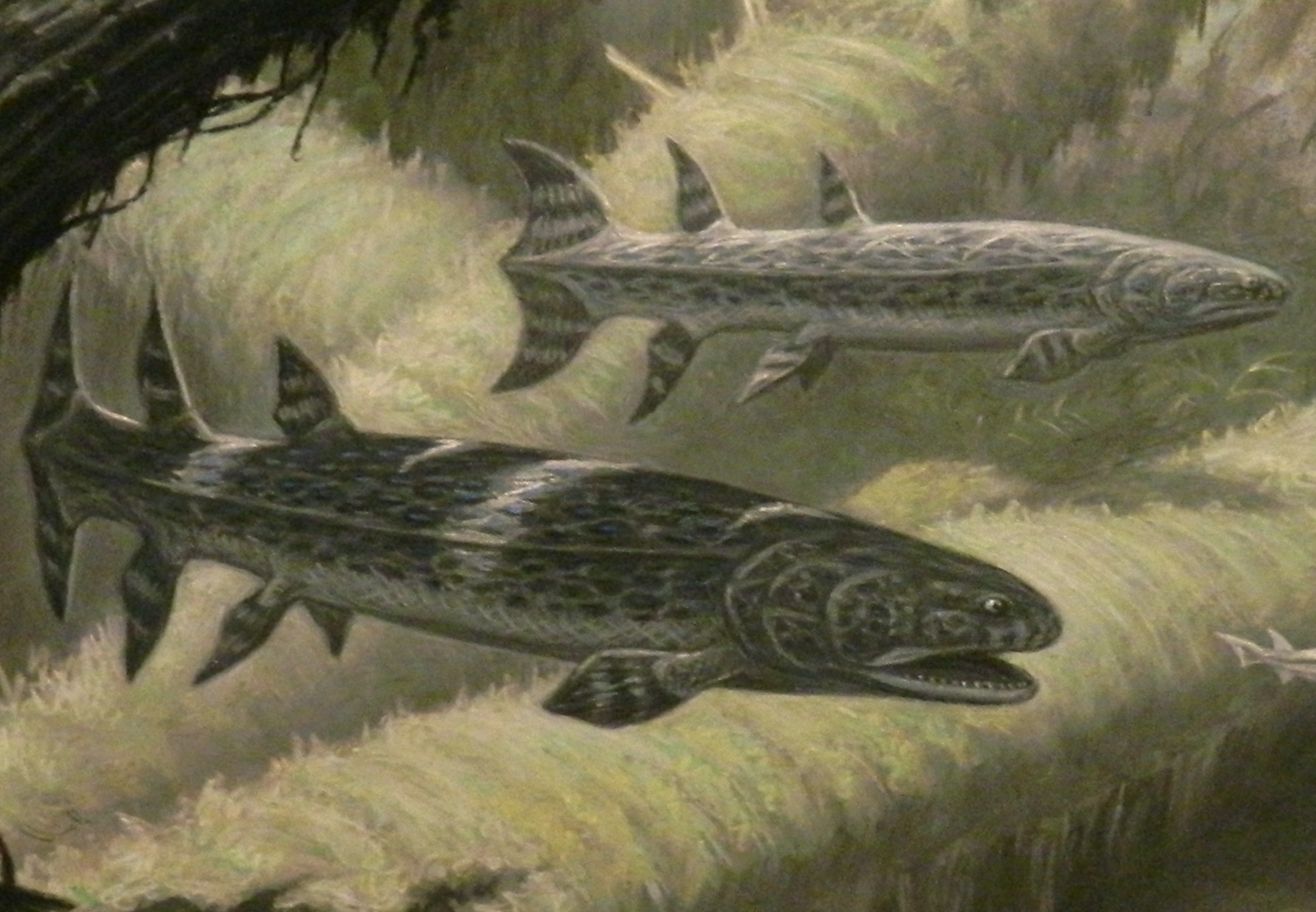
- Life restoration of the Late Devonian lobe-finned fish Hyneria
  †Hyneria – type locality for genus
  - †Hyneria lindae – type locality for species
- †Hyolithellus
- †Hyolithes
- †Hyolithid
- †Indiana – tentative report
- †Iocrinus
- †Irvingella
- †Isodectes
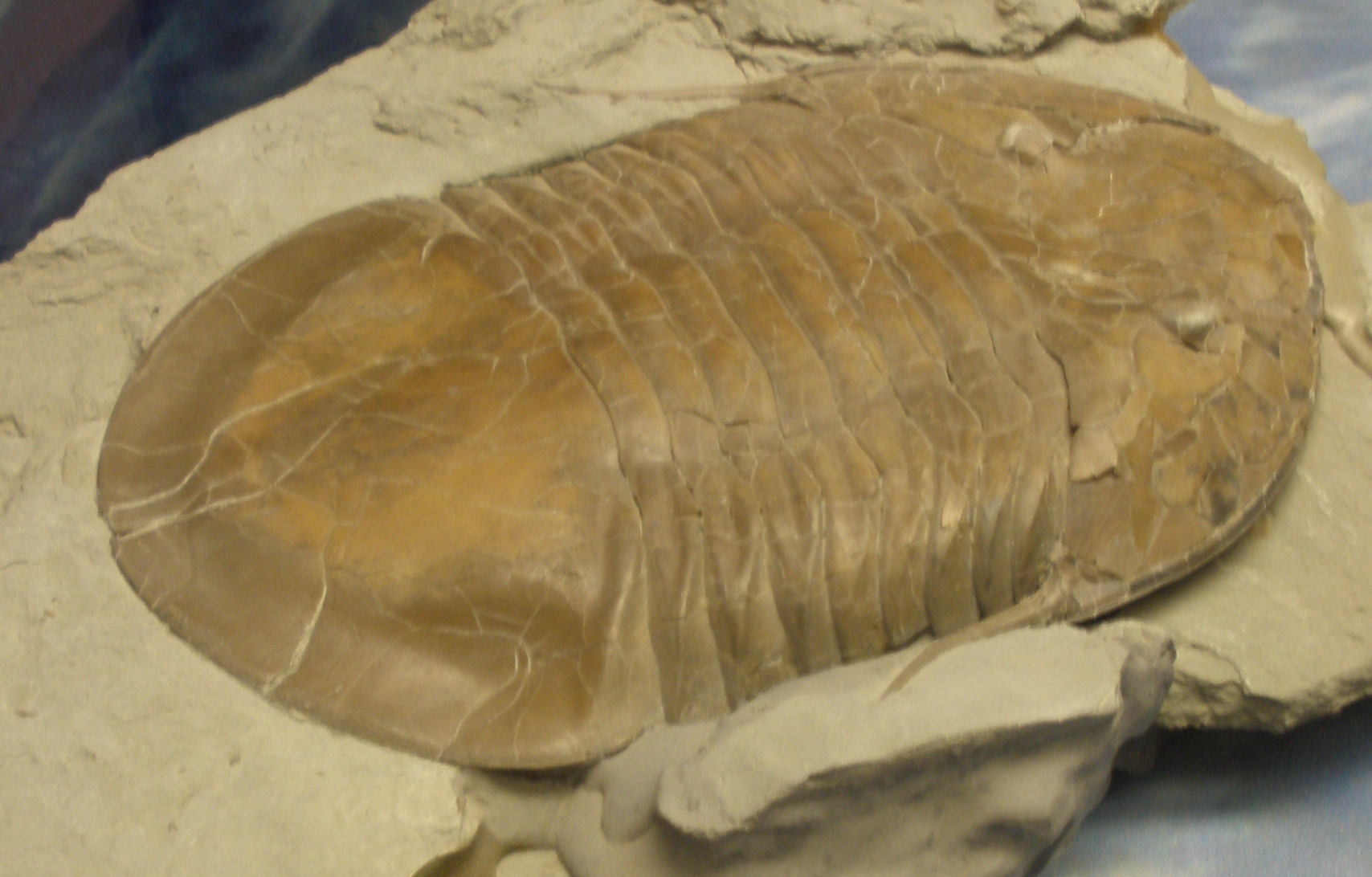
- Fossil of the Middle-Late Ordovician giant trilobite Isotelus.
  †Isotelus
  - †Isotelus gigas
- †Kiaeropterus
- †Kingstonia
- †Kladognathus
- †Kootenia
- †Kutorgina
- †Lancastria
- †Langlieria
  - †L. radiatus – type locality for species
  - †L. smalingi – type locality for species
- †Lepidostrobus
- †Leptomitus
- †Lenisicaris
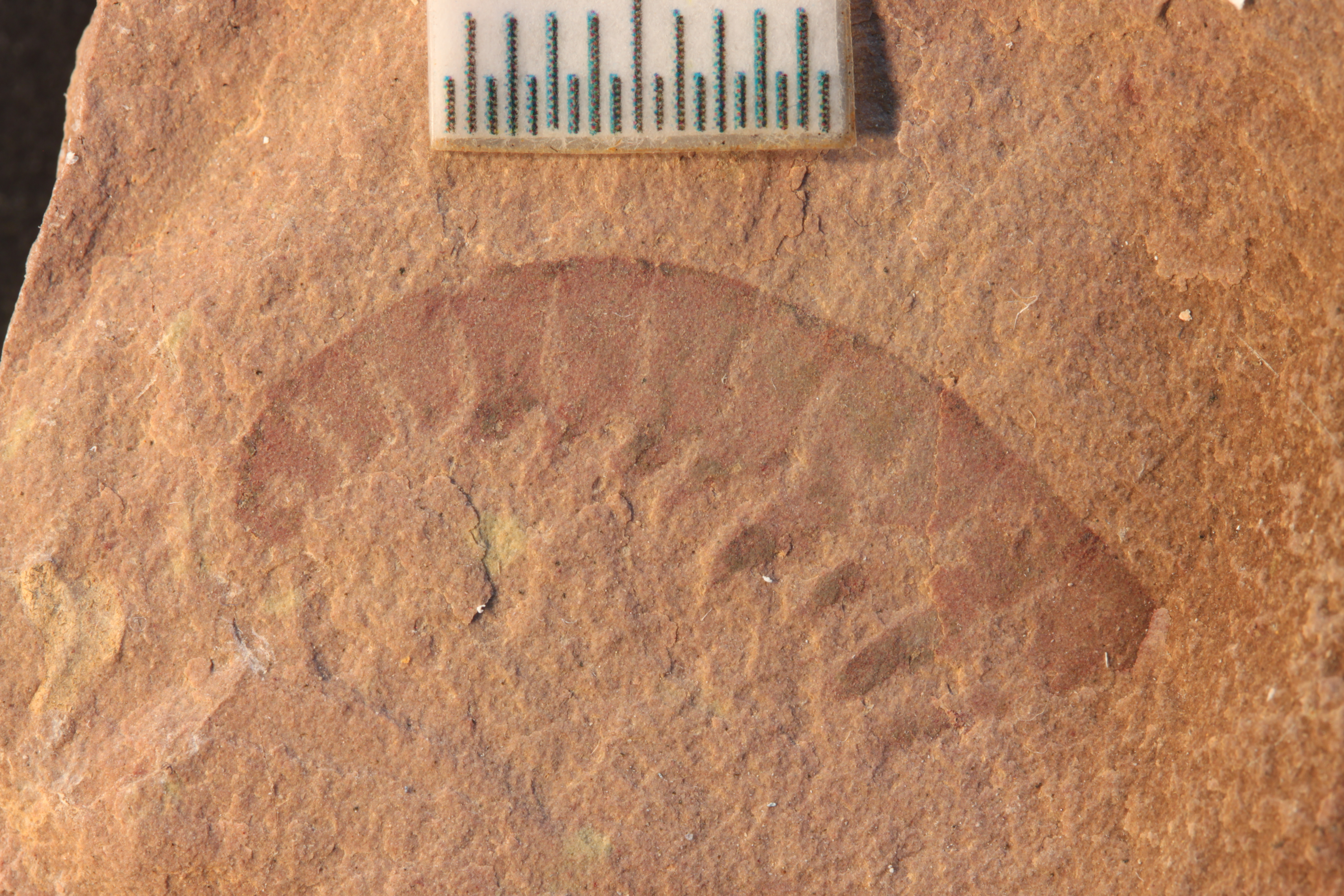
  - Appendage of the Cambrian radiodont Lenisicaris
    †L. pennsylvanica – type locality for species
- Lingula
- †Lingulella
- †Llanoaspidella – type locality for genus
- †Llanoaspis – tentative report
- †Lonchocephalus
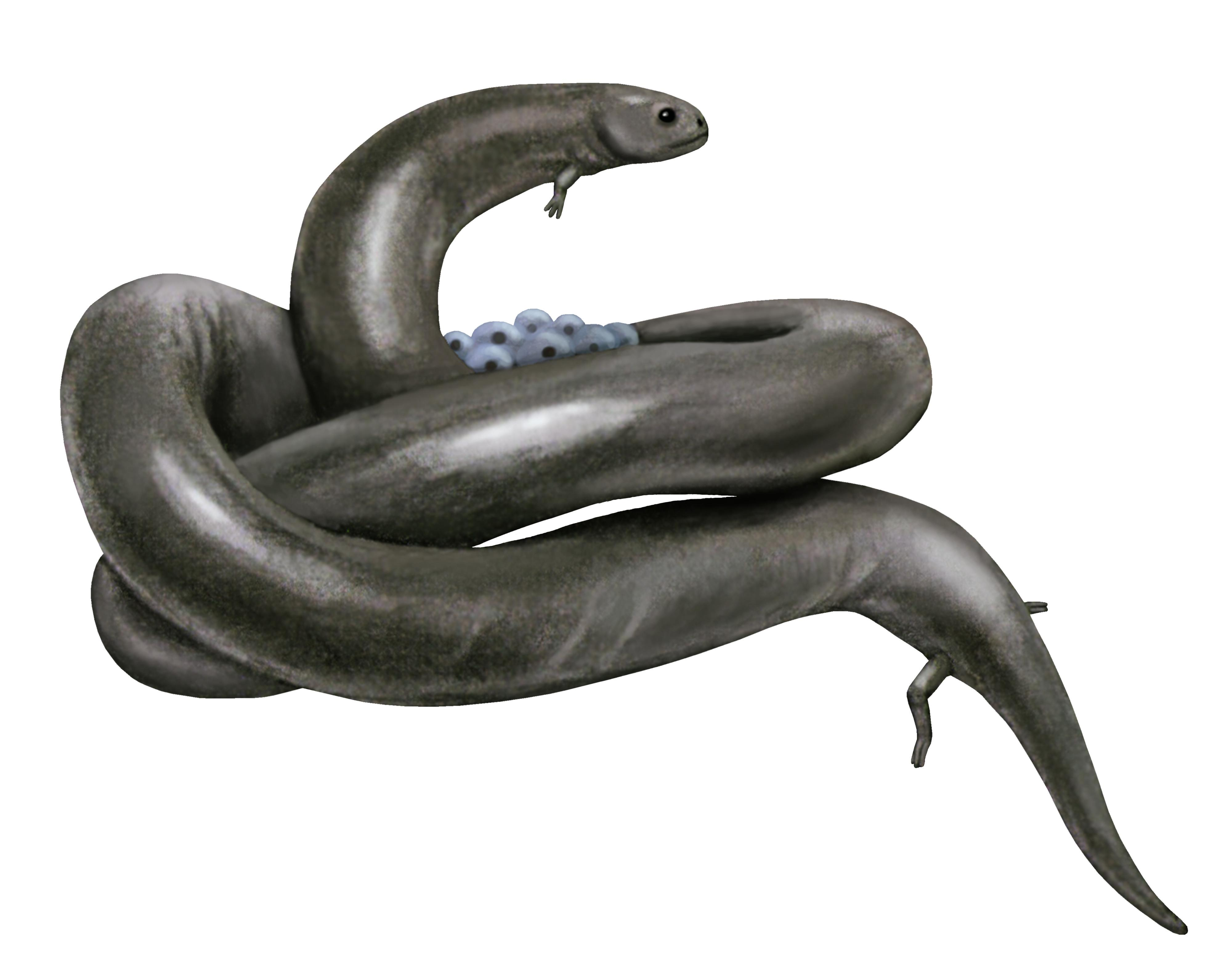
- Life restoration of the Permian snake-like amphibian Lysorophus showing speculative egg-coiling behavior
  †Lysorophus
- †Margaretia
- †Martinia
- †Megalograptus – tentative report
- †Megamolgophis
- †Metacoceras
- †Michelinoceras
- †Micromitra
- †Mimagoniatites – tentative report
- †Mucrospirifer
  - †Mucrospirifer mucronatus
- †Nanahughmilleria
- †Naticopsis
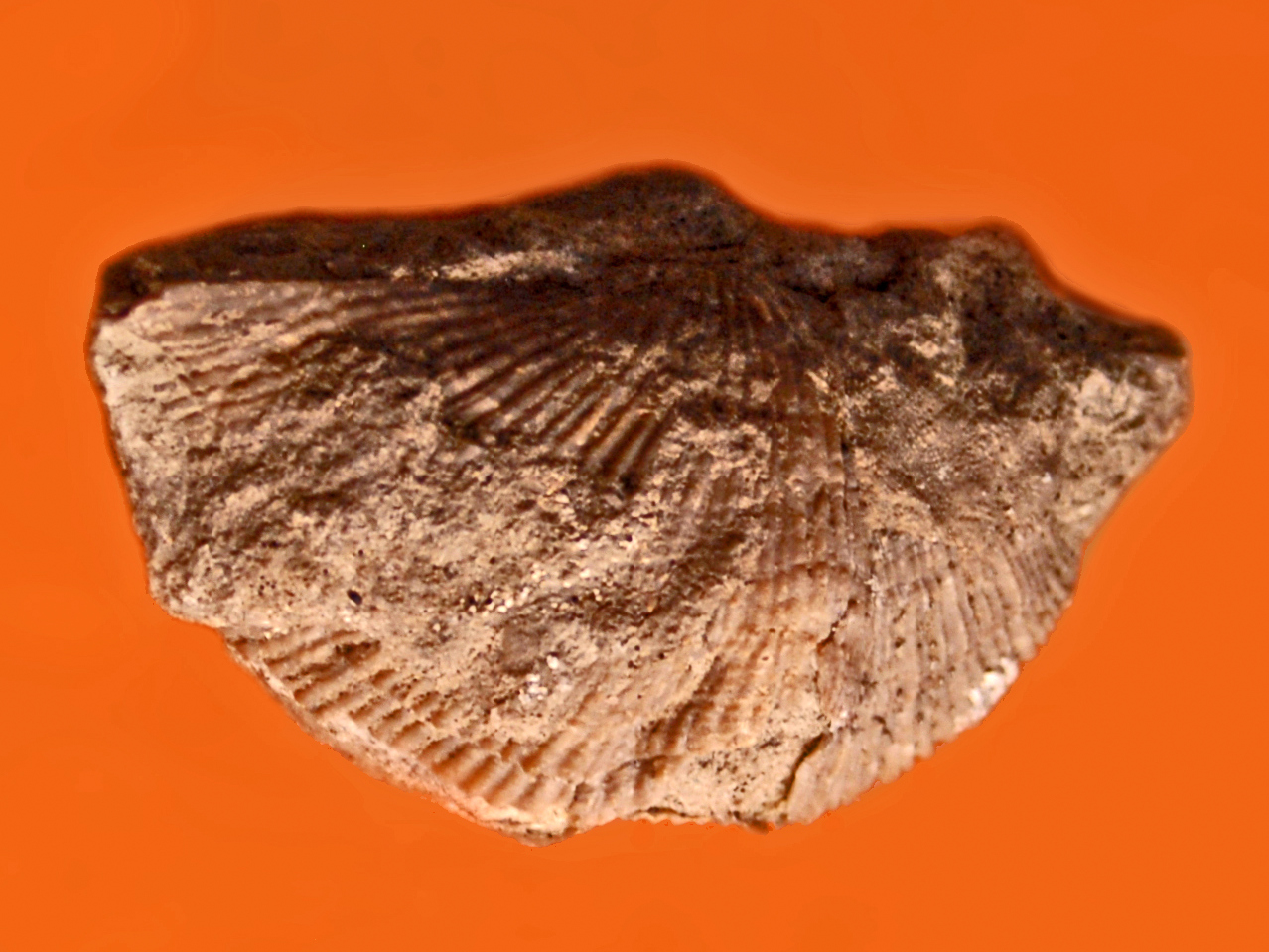
- Fossilized shell of the Carboniferous-Permian brachiopod Neospirifer
  †Neospirifer
  - †Neospirifer cameratus
- †Neuropteris
- †Nisusia
- Nucula
- †Ogygopsis
- †Olenellus
- †Olenoides
  - †Olenoides serratus
- †Orthacanthus
- †Orthoceras
- †Orthotheca
- †Oryctocephalus
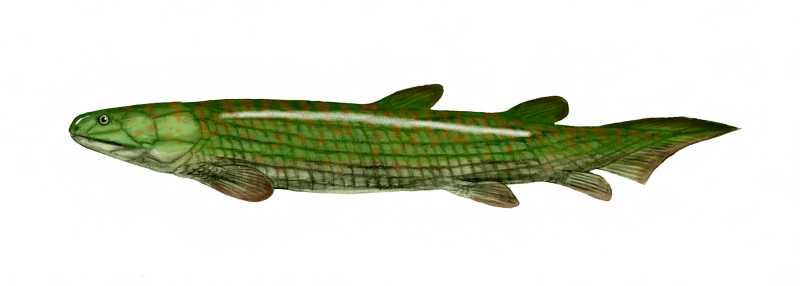
- Restoration
  †Osteolepis
- †Oulodus
- †Ozarkodina
- †Paedeumias
- †Pagetia
- †Paladin
- †Panenka
- †Parahughmilleria
- †Paraspirifer
- †Paterina
- †Pelagiella
- †Pemphigaspis
- †Pentremites
- †Peronopsis
- †Petalodus
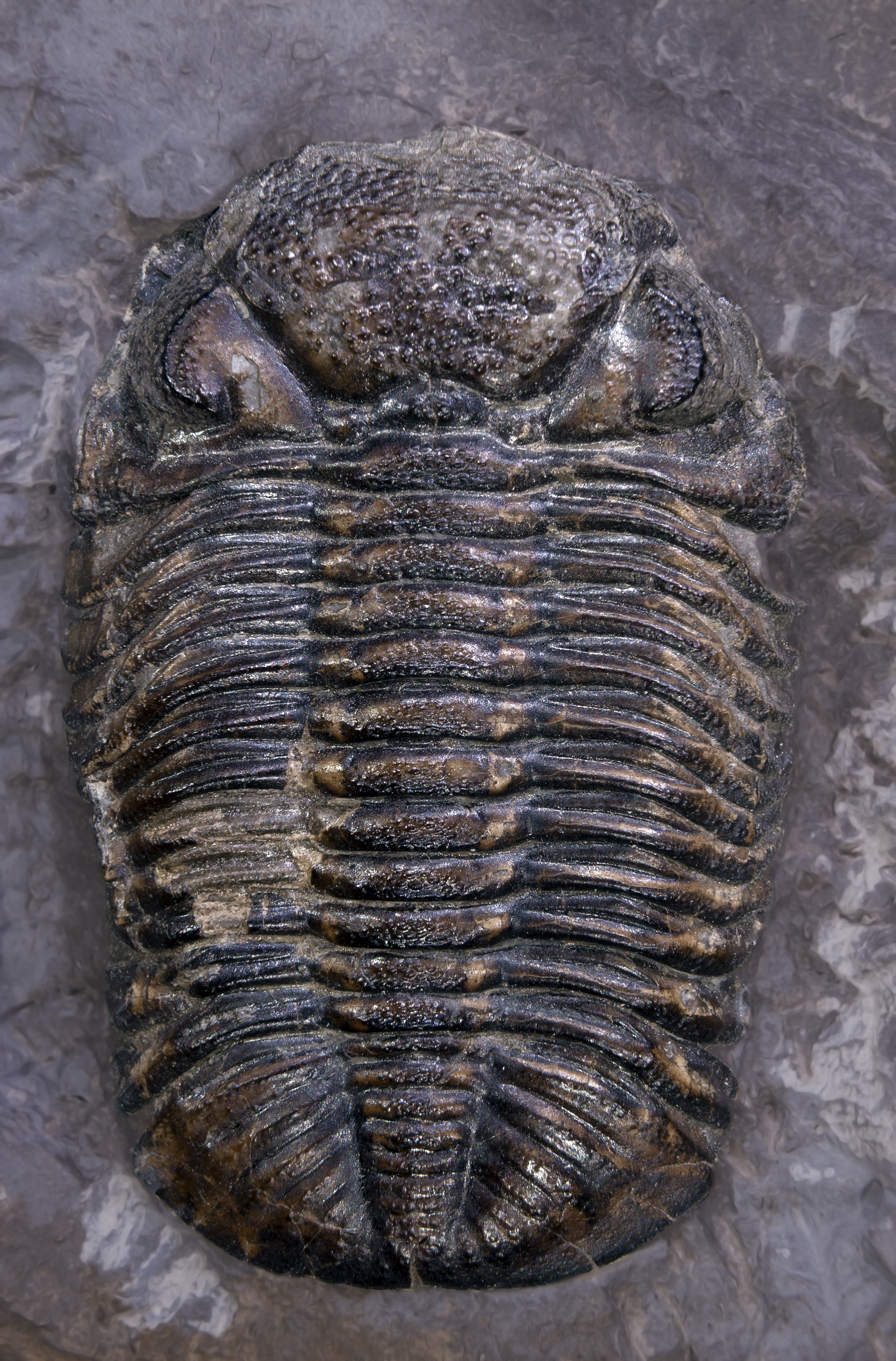
- Fossil of the Devonian trilobite Phacops rana
  †Phacops
- Pinna
- †Platyceras
- †Pleurodictyum
- †Proetus
- †Protobarinophyton
- †Protocaris
- †Protospongia – tentative report
- †Pugnax
- †Quasillites
- †Rhinocarcinosoma
- †Rhodea
- †Ribeiria
- †Ruedemannipterus
- †Salterella
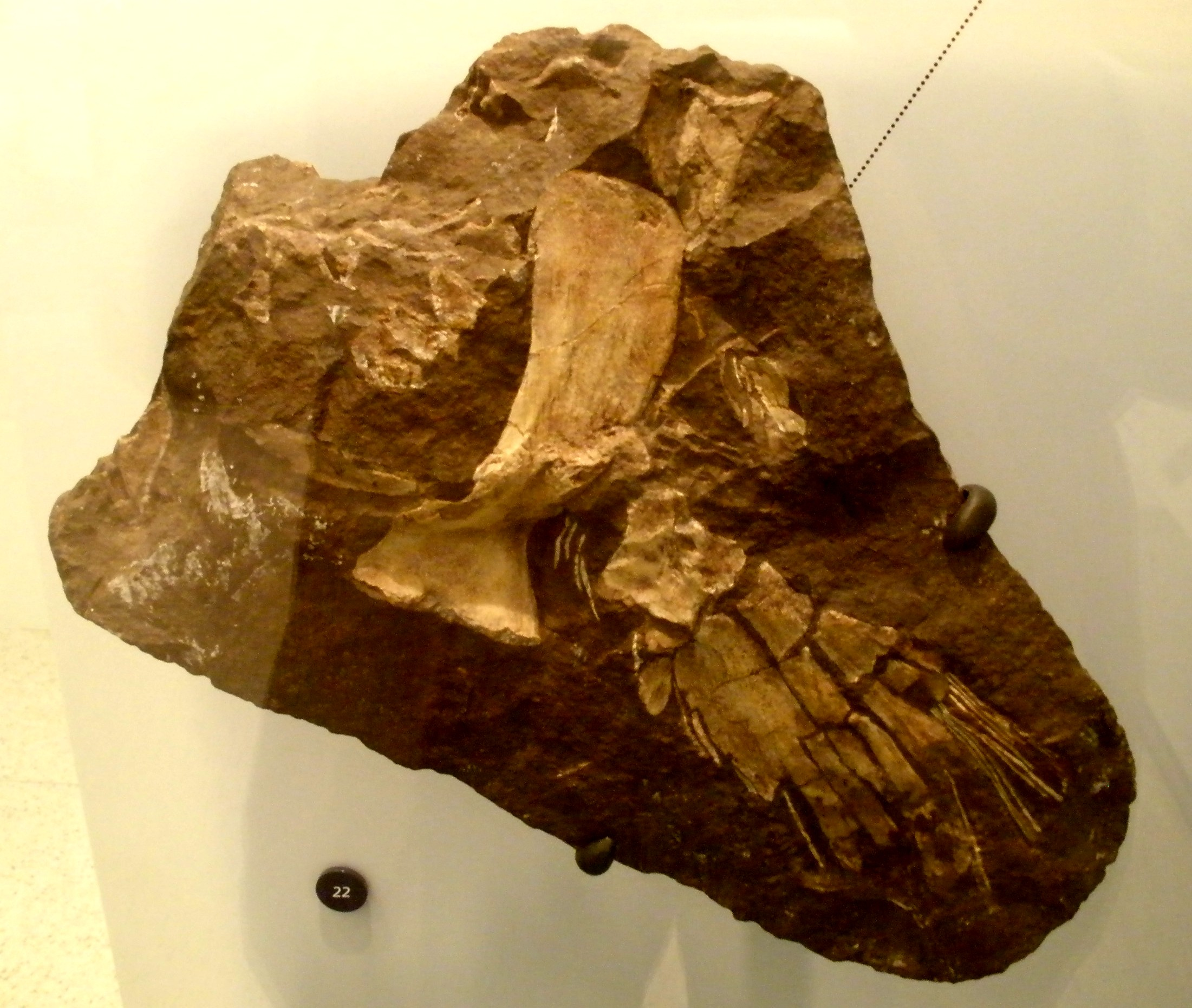
- Fossilized fin of the Devonian lobe-finned fish Sauripterus
  †Sauripterus
  - †Sauripterus taylori
- †Schaefferia (Paleozoic plant) – or unidentified comparable form
- †Schizodiscus
- †Sciadophyton
- †Selkirkia
- †Sidneyia
- †Sigillaria
- †Solenochilus
- †Sowerbyella
- †Spathognathodus
- †Spirifer
- †Spyroceras
- †Strophomena
- †Taeniocrada
- †Tentaculites
- Diagram of the branches of the Middle-Late Devonian vascular plant Tetraxylopteris
  †Tetraxylopteris
- †Titusvillia – type locality for genus
- †Triarthrus
- †Tricrepicephalus
- †Trimerus
- †Tubulella
- †Tuzoia
- †Urasterella
- †Vinella
- †Wanneria
- †Wilkingia
- †Worthenia
- †Yochelcionella

== Mesozoic ==
- †Anchisauripus
  - †Anchisauripus gwyneddensis – type locality for species
  - †Anchisauripus poolei – type locality for species
  - †Anchisauripus sillimani
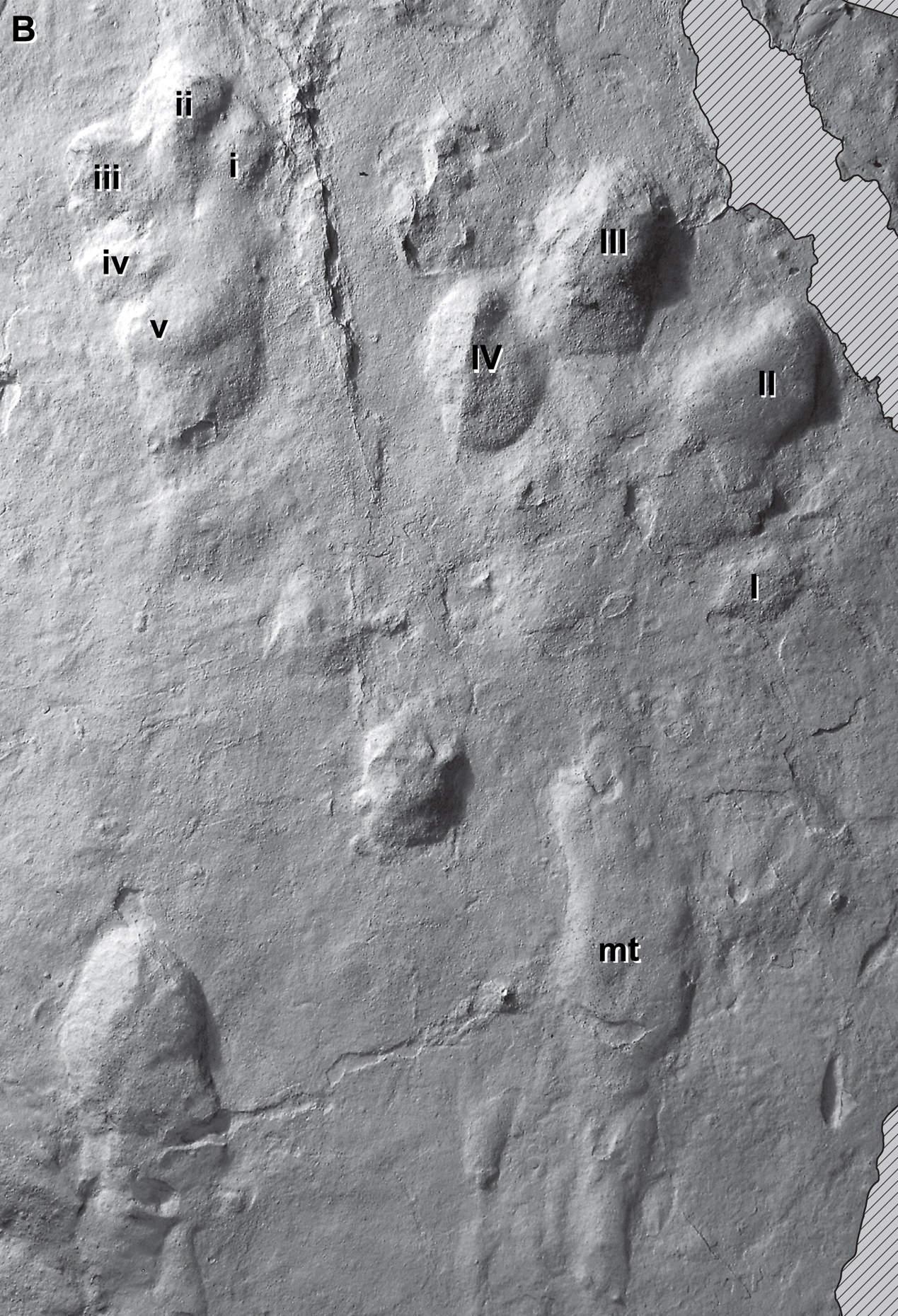
- Fossil (right) of the Early Jurassic dinosaur footprint ichnogenus Anomoepus
  †Anomoepus
  - †Anomoepus gracillimus
- †Apatopus
- †Atreipus
  - †Atreipus milfordensis
- †Batrachopus
  - †Batrachopus gracilis
- †Belodon
  - †Belodon priscus
- †Brachychirotherium
- †Brontozoum
  - †Brontozoum sillimanium
- †Calamops – type locality for genus
  - †Calamops paludosus – type locality for species
- †Chirotherium
  - †Chirotherium lulli
  - †Chirotherium parvum
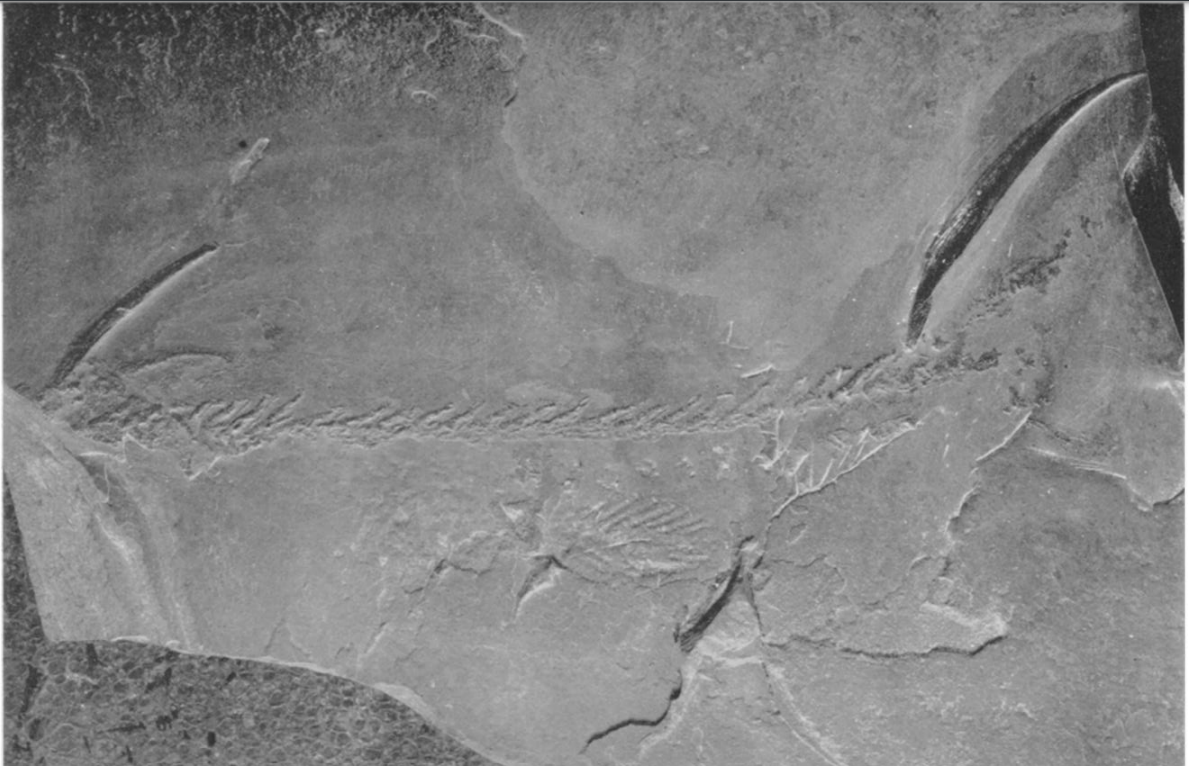
- Fossil of the Late Triassic shark Carinacanthus
  †Carinacanthus – type locality for genus
  - †Carinacanthus jepseni – type locality for species
- †Cionichthys
- †Clepsysaurus – type locality for genus
  - †Clepsysaurus pennsylvanicus – type locality for species
  - †Clepsysaurus veatleianus
- †Dinophyton
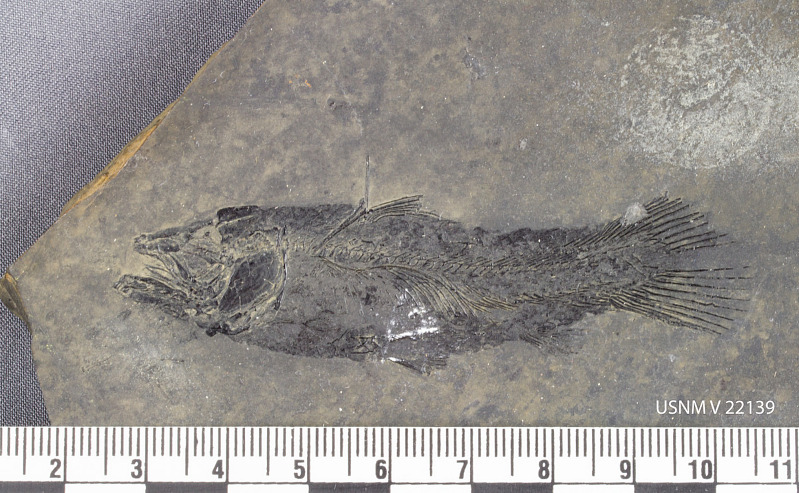
- Fossil of the Late Triassic coelacanth Diplurus
  †Diplurus
  - †Diplurus longicaudatus
- †Dipterus
  - †Dipterus redfieldi
- †Eubrontes
  - †Eubrontes giganteus
- †Grallator
  - †Grallator cuneatus
  - †Grallator tenuis
- †Gwyneddichnium – type locality for genus
  - †Gwyneddichnium majore – type locality for species
- †Gwyneddosaurus – type locality for genus
  - †Gwyneddosaurus erici – type locality for species
- †Koskinonodon
  - †Koskinonodon perfectus
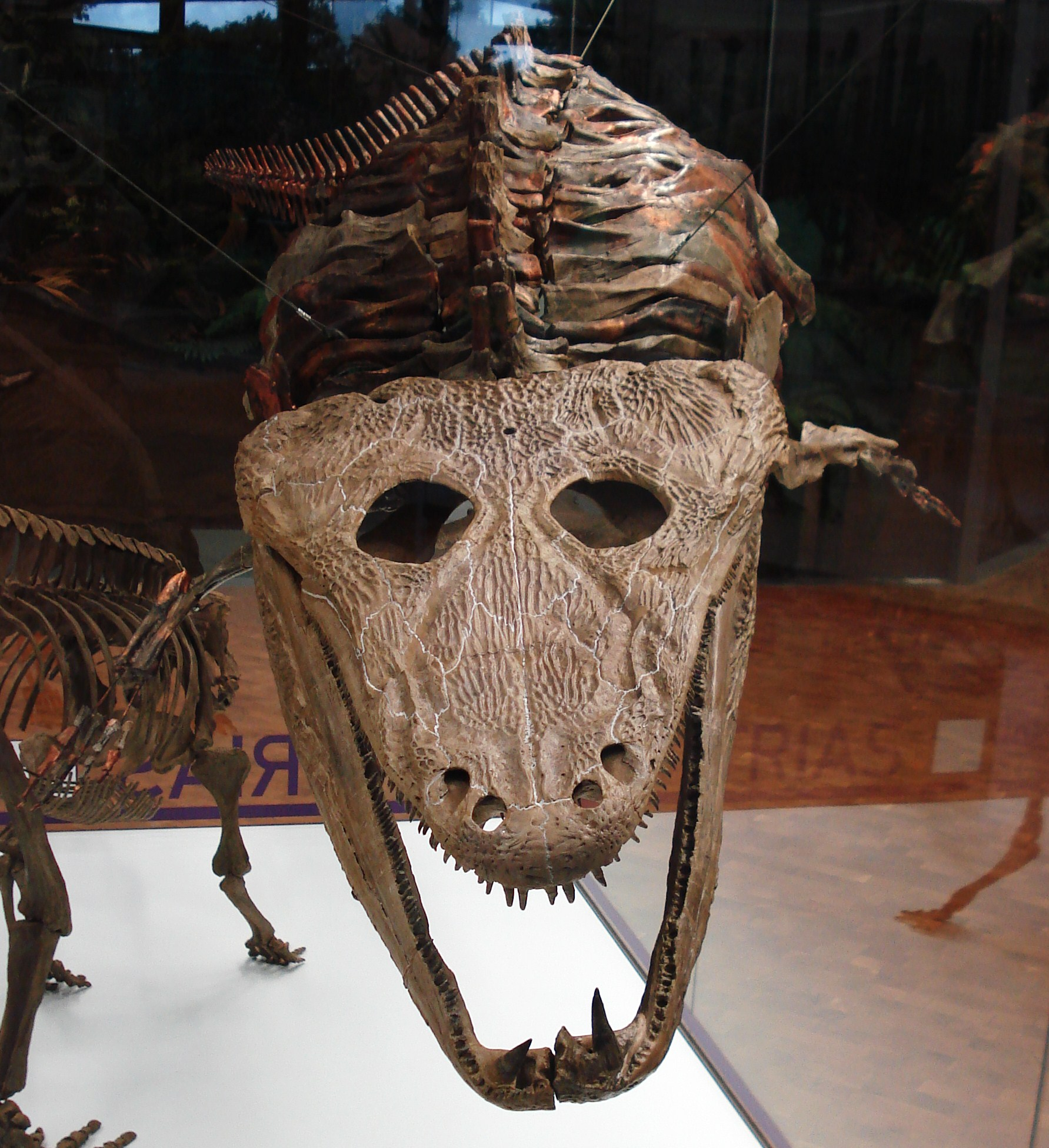
- Fossilized skeleton of the Middle Triassic amphibian Mastodonsaurus
  †Mastodonsaurus
  - †Mastodonsaurus durus – type locality for species
- †Orthodactylus
  - †Orthodactylus howelli – type locality for species
- †Otozoum – tentative report
  - †Otozoum minus
- †Pagiophyllum
- †Palaeoctonus
  - †Palaeoctonus appalachianus
- †Palaeosaurus
  - †Palaeosaurus fraserianus – type locality for species
- †Platypterna
  - †Platypterna lockatong – type locality for species
- †Pterodactylus
  - †Pterodactylus longispinis – type locality for species
- †Revueltosaurus
- †Rhynchosauroides
  - †Rhynchosauroides brunswickii
  - †Rhynchosauroides hyperbates
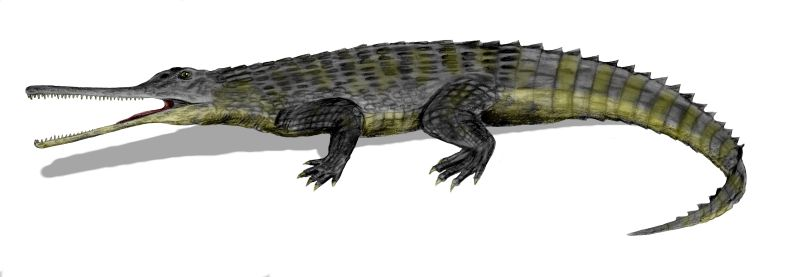
- Life restoration of the Late Triassic phytosaur Rutiodon
  †Rutiodon
  - †Rutiodon carolinensis
- †Scoyenia
- †Sphodrosaurus – type locality for genus
  - †Sphodrosaurus pennsylvanicus – type locality for species
- †Suchoprion
  - †Suchoprion aulacodus
  - †Suchoprion cyphodon
- †Synorichthys
  - †S. cf. stewarti
- †Turseodus

== Cenozoic ==
- Acidota
  - †Acidota crenata
  - †Acidota quadrata
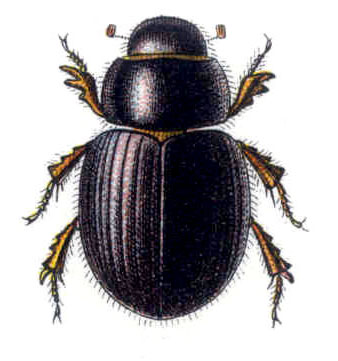
- Illustration of an Aegialia dung beetle
  Aegialia
- Agonum
  - †Agonum affine
  - †Agonum consimile
  - †Agonum gratiosum
  - †Agonum quinquepunctatum
  - †Agonum simile
- Amara
- Apalone
  - †Apalone mutica – tentative report
- Aphodius
  - †Aphodius precursor – type locality for species
- Apion
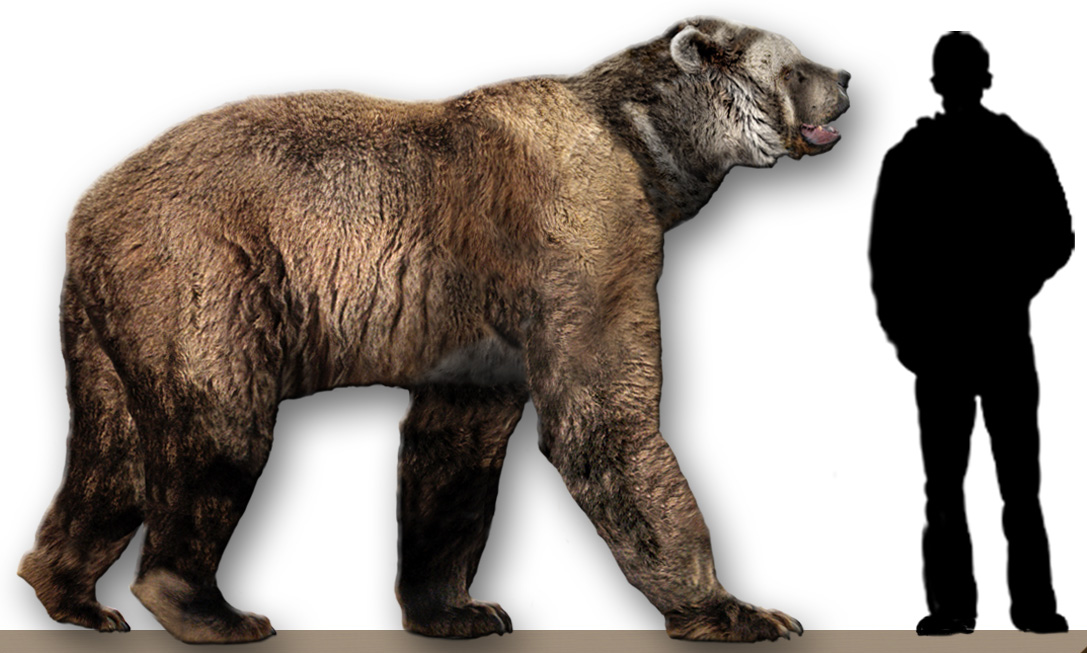
- Restoration of an Arctodus, or short-faced bear, with a human to scale
  †Arctodus
  - †Arctodus pristinus – type locality for species
- Arpedium
  - †Arpedium cribratum
- †Ateuchus – tentative report
- Bembidion
  - †Bembidion anguliferum group informal
  - †Bembidion fortestriatum
  - †Bembidion frontale
  - †Bembidion incertum group informal
  - †Bembidion morulum
  - †Bembidion mutatum
  - †Bembidion pseudocautum
  - †Bembidion versicolor – or unidentified comparable form
- Blarina
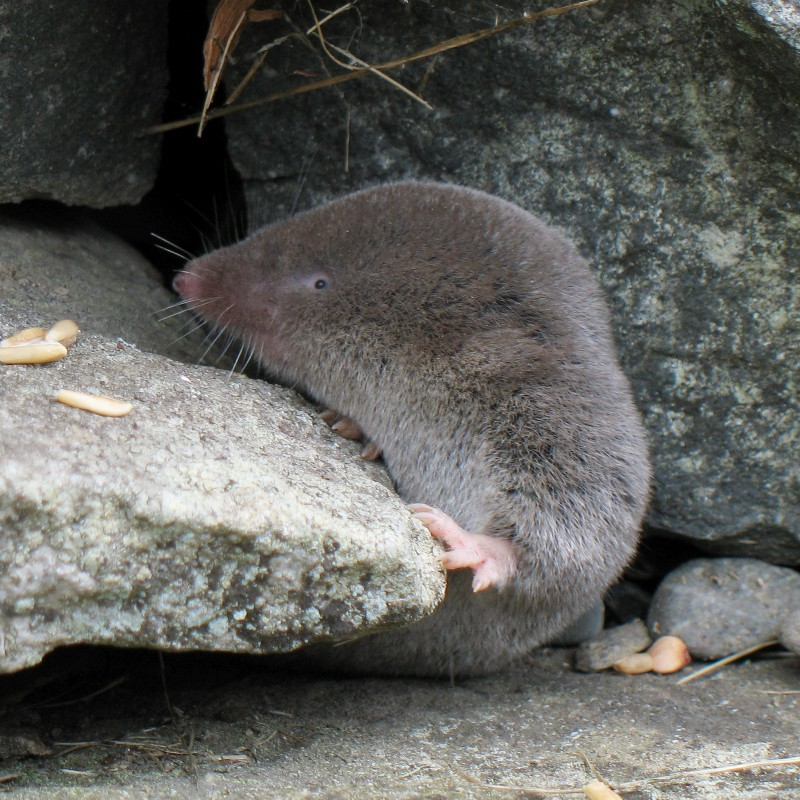
  - A living Blarina brevicauda, or northern short-tailed shrew
    †Blarina brevicauda – type locality for species
  - †Blarina carolinensis
- Bledius
- Blethisa
  - †Blethisa catenaria
- Boreaphilus
  - †Boreaphilus henningianus
- †Brachyprotoma
  - †Brachyprotoma obtusata – type locality for species
- Bufo
  - †Bufo americanus
- Canis
  - †Canis armbrusteri
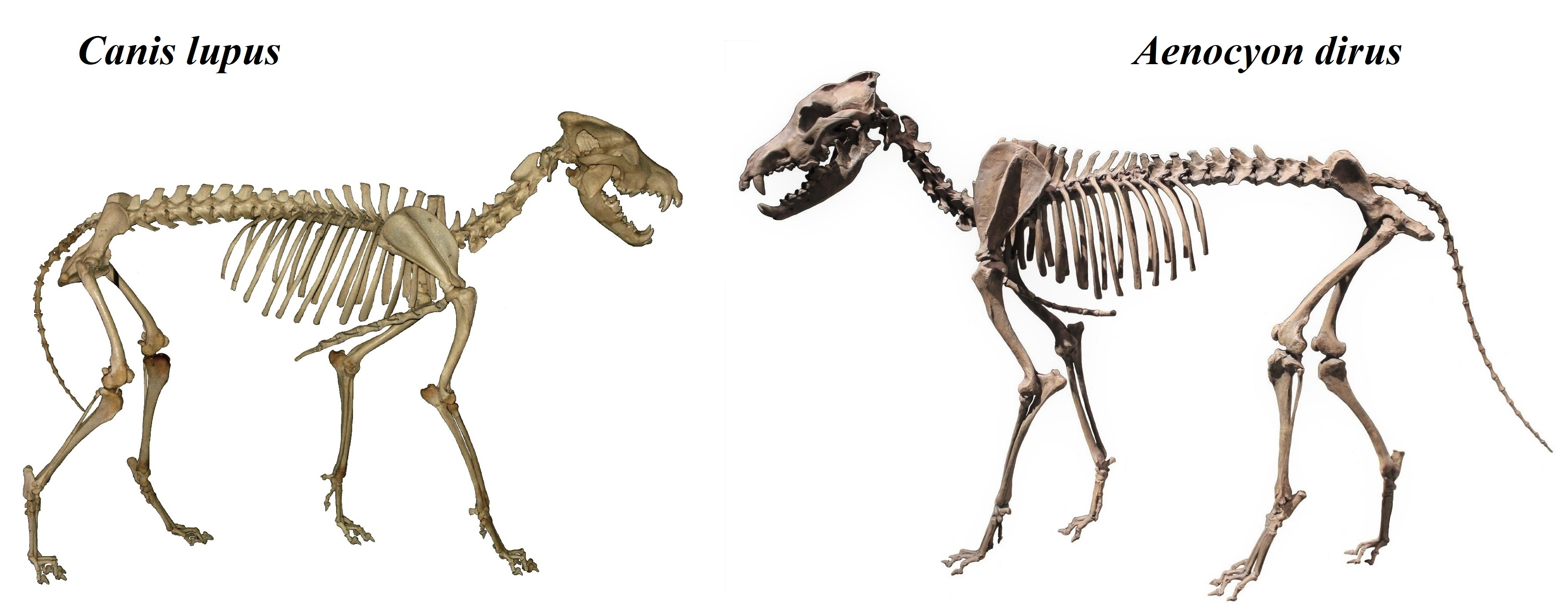
  - Modern mounted skeleton of Canis lupus, the grey wolf, to scale with a fossilized skeleton of the Pleistocene wolf Canis dirus, or dire wolf
    †Canis dirus
- Carabus
  - †Carabus maeander
- †Cariacus
  - †Cariacus laevicornis – type locality for species
- Carphoborus
  - †Carphoborus andersoni
- Castor
  - †Castor canadensis
- †Castoroides
  - †Castoroides ohioensis
- Catops
- †Cervalces
- Chlaenius
  - †Chlaenius punctulatus – type locality for species
- Colinus
  - †Colinus virginianus
- Coluber
  - †Coluber acuminatus – type locality for species
  - †Coluber constrictor
- Colymbetes
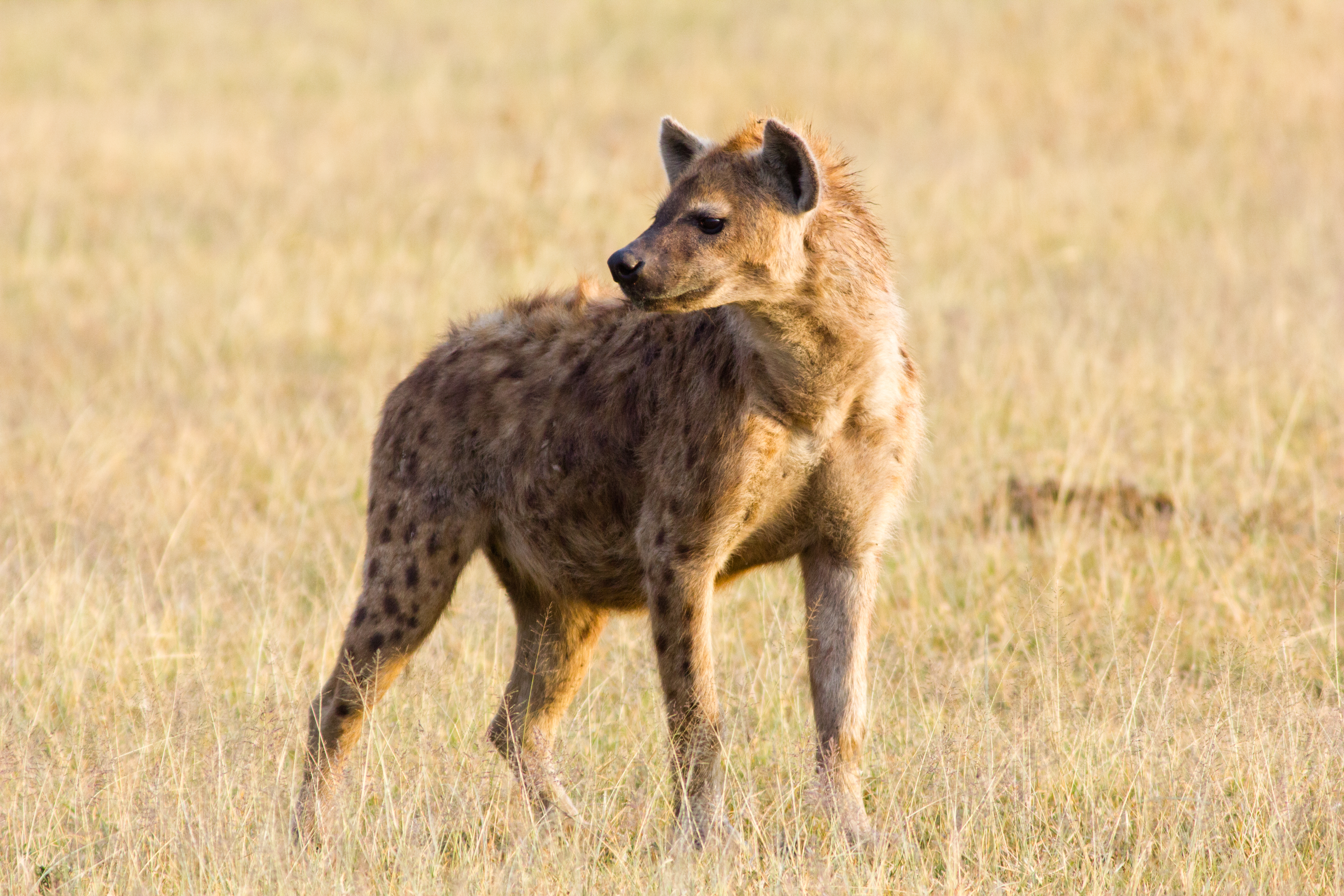
- A living Crocuta crocuta, or spotted hyena
  Crocuta
  - †Crocuta inexpectatus – type locality for species
- Crotalus
  - †Crotalus horridus
- Curimopsis
  - †Curimopsis moosilauke – or unidentified comparable form
- †Cychrus
  - †Cychrus minor – type locality for species
  - †Cychrus wheatleyi – type locality for species
- Cymindis
  - †Cymindis aurora – type locality for species
  - †Cymindis cribricollis
- Cytilus
  - †Cytilus alternatus
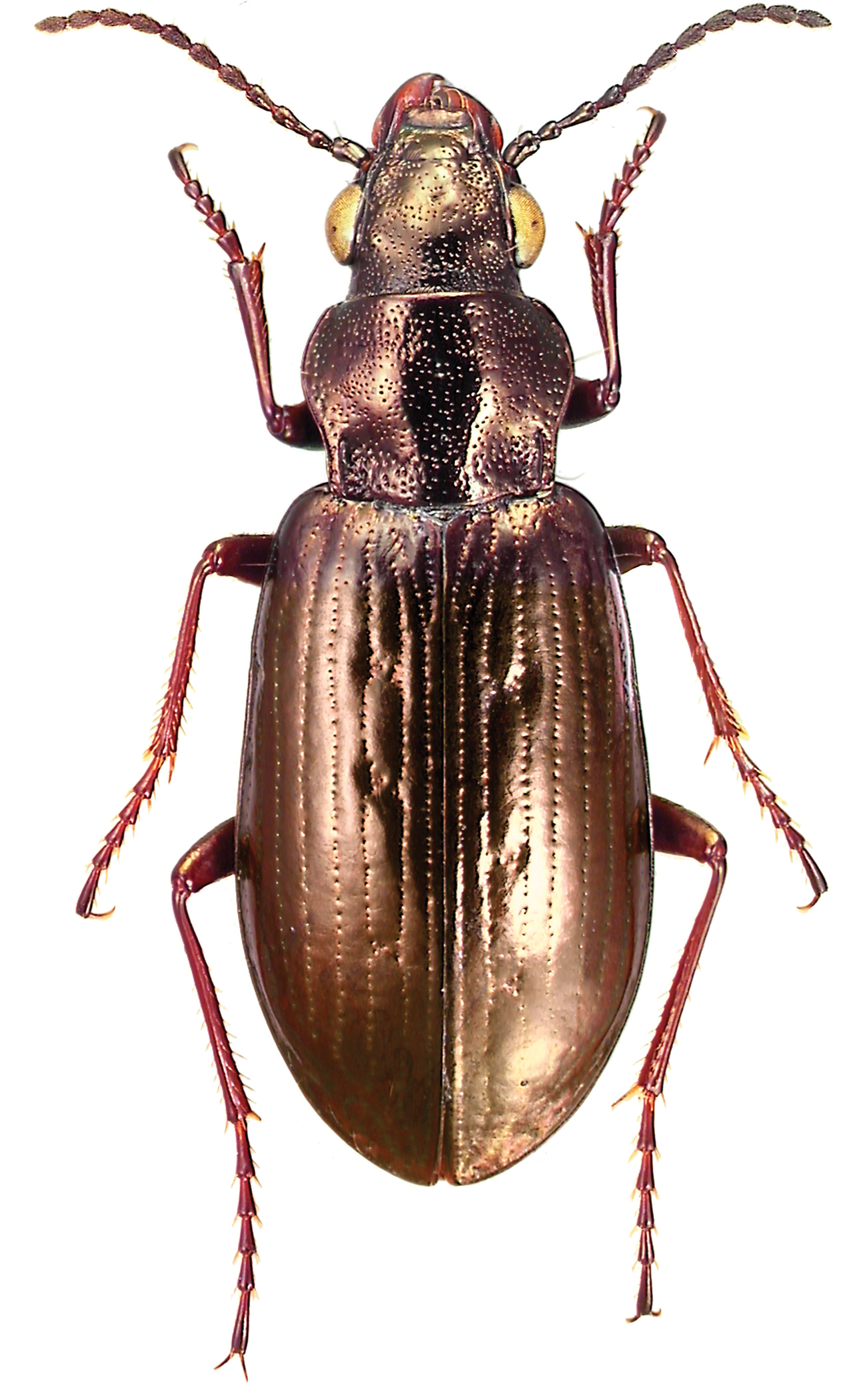
- A preserved Diacheila ground beetle
  Diacheila
  - †Diacheila arctica
- Dicaelus
  - †Dicaelus alutaceus – type locality for species
- Donacia
- Dyschirius
  - †Dyschirius integer group informal
  - †Dyschirius melancholicus
- Elaphe
  - †Elaphe vulpina
- Elaphrus
  - †Elaphrus americanus
  - †Elaphrus clairvillei
  - †Elaphrus lapponicus
- Emydoidea
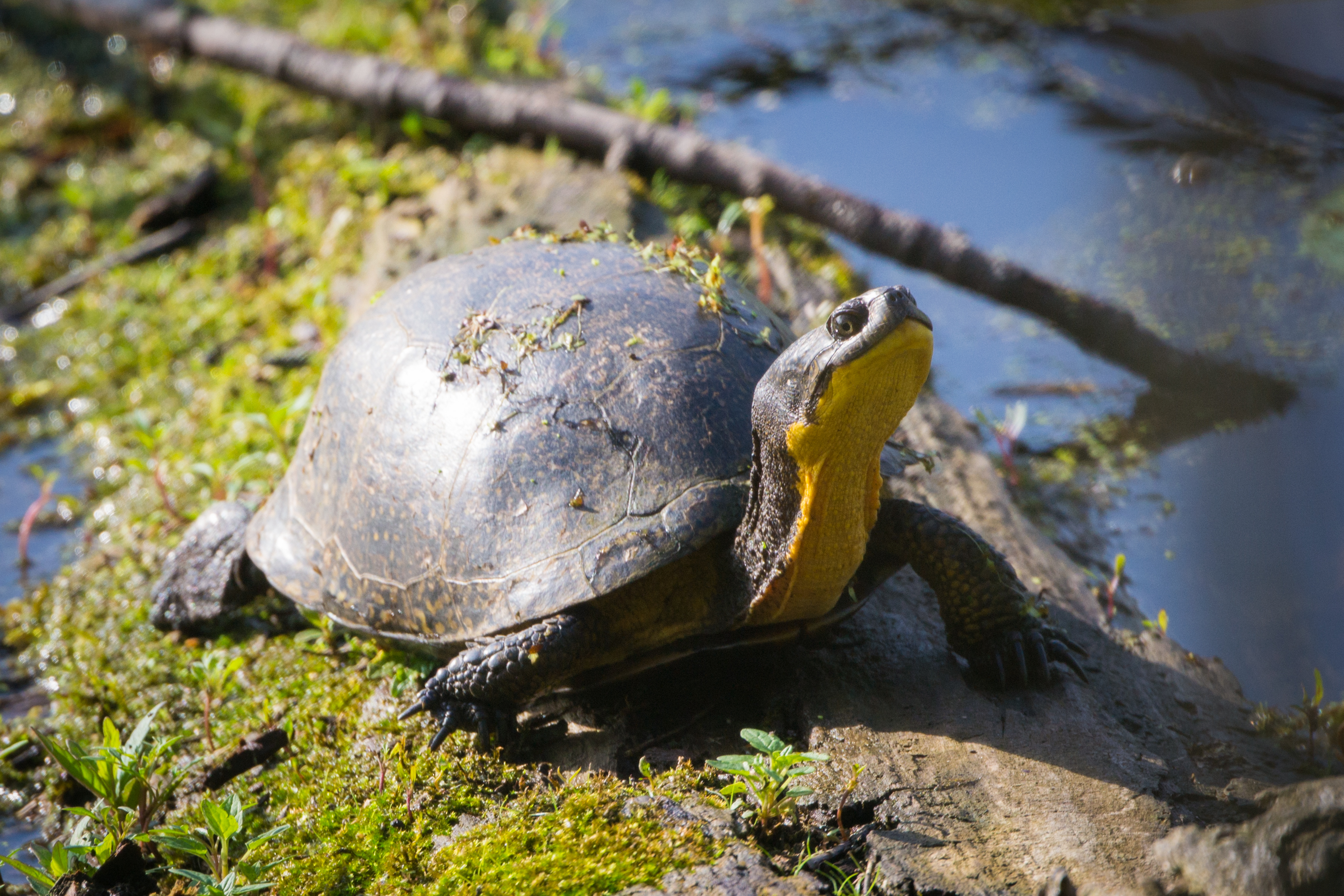
  - A living Emys blandingii, or Blanding's turtle
    †Emydoidea blandingii
- Enochrus
- Equus
  - †Equus complicatus
  - †Equus pectinatus
- Erethizon
  - †Erethizon dorsatum
- Eucnecosum
  - †Eucnecosum brunnescens
- Glyptemys
  - †Glyptemys insculpta
- Gulo
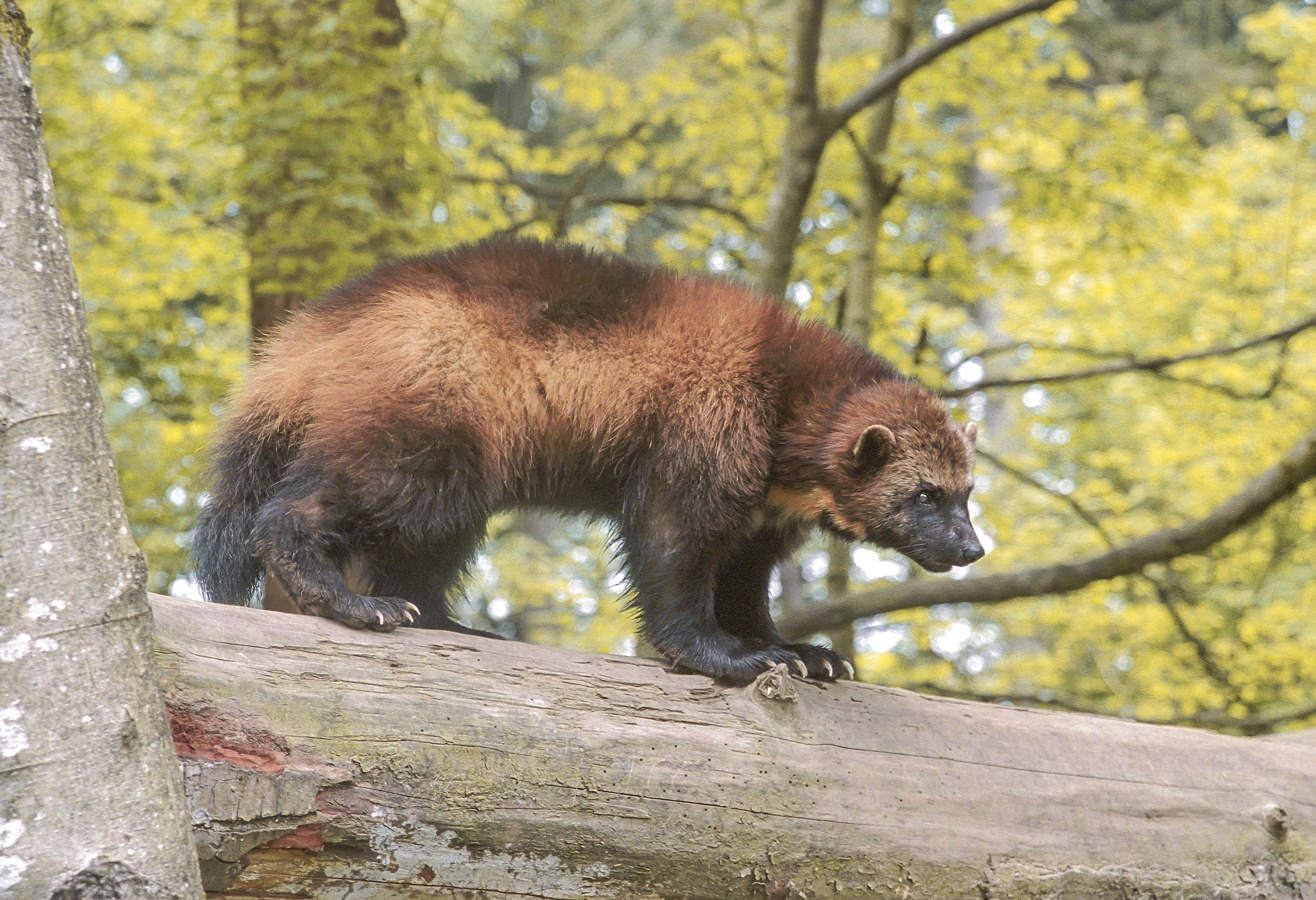
  - A living Gulo gulo, or wolverine
    †Gulo gulo
- Gymnusa
- Harpalus
- Helophorus
  - †Helophorus sempervarians
  - †Helophorus tuberculatus
- †Hesperotestudo
  - †Hesperotestudo percrassa – type locality for species
- Heterodon
  - †Heterodon platyrhinos
- Holoboreaphilus
  - †Holoboreaphilus nordenskioldi
- Homo
  - †Homo sapiens
- Hydraena
- Hydroporus
- Hyla
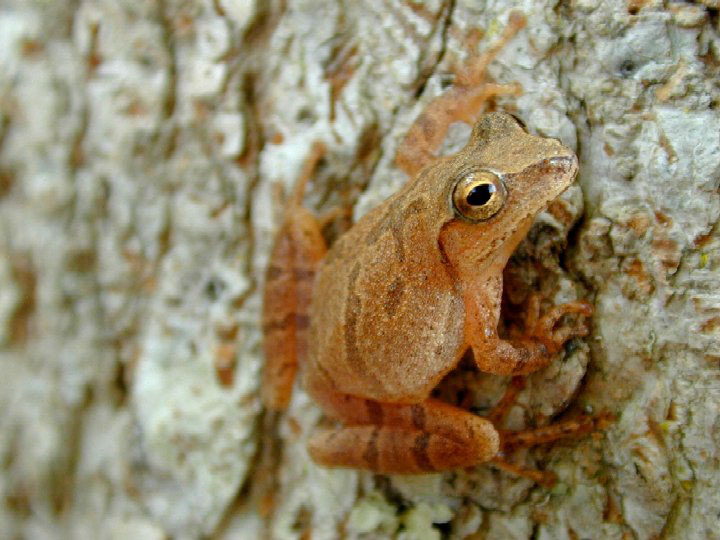
  - A living Pseudacris crucifer (formerly Hyla crucifer), or spring peeper
    †Hyla crucifer
- Lampropeltis
  - †Lampropeltis triangulum
- Lasiopodomys – tentative report
- Lesteva
  - †Lesteva pallipes
- Lontra
  - †Lontra canadensis
- Loricera
  - †Loricera pilicornis
- Lynx
  - †Lynx calcaratus – type locality for species
- †Mammut
  - †Mammut americanum
- †Mammuthus
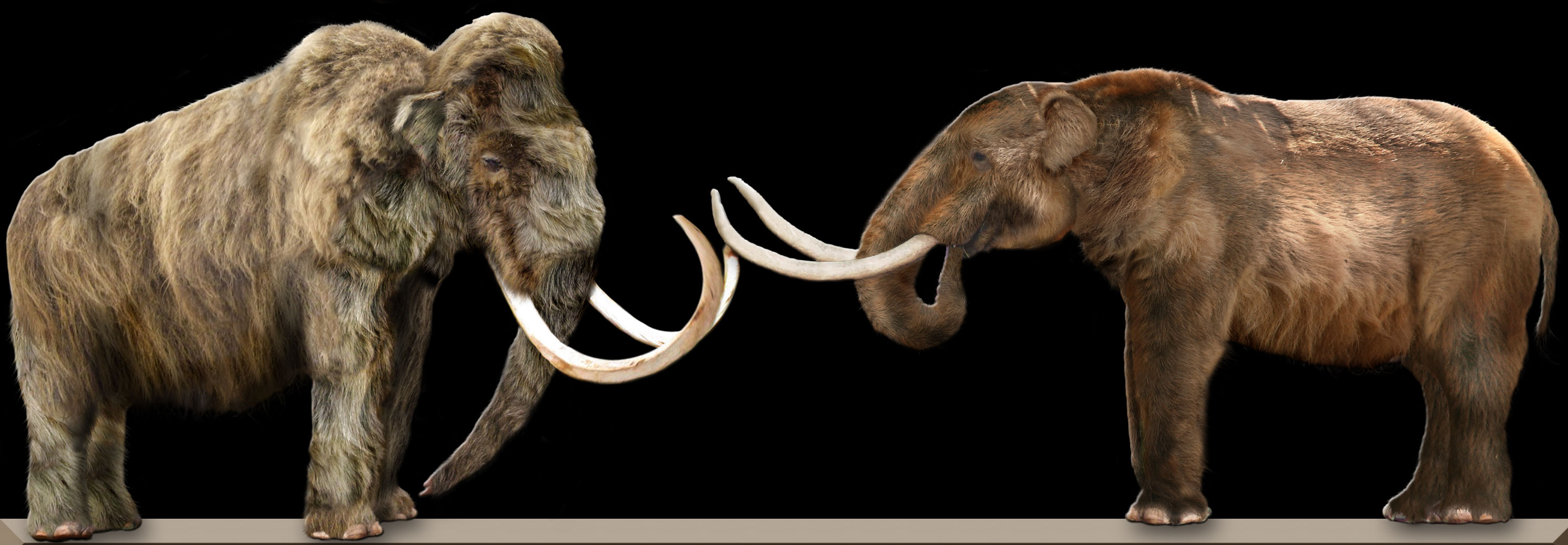
  - Life restorations of a Mammut americanum, or American mastodon (right), and a Mammuthus primigenius, or wooly mammoth (left)
    †Mammuthus primigenius
- Mantura
- Marmota
  - †Marmota monax – or unidentified comparable form
- †Megalonyx
  - †Megalonyx wheatleyi
- Meleagris
  - †Meleagris gallopavo
- Mephitis
  - †Mephitis mephitis
- Microedus
  - †Microedus austinianus
- Microtus
  - †Microtus guildayi – or unidentified comparable form
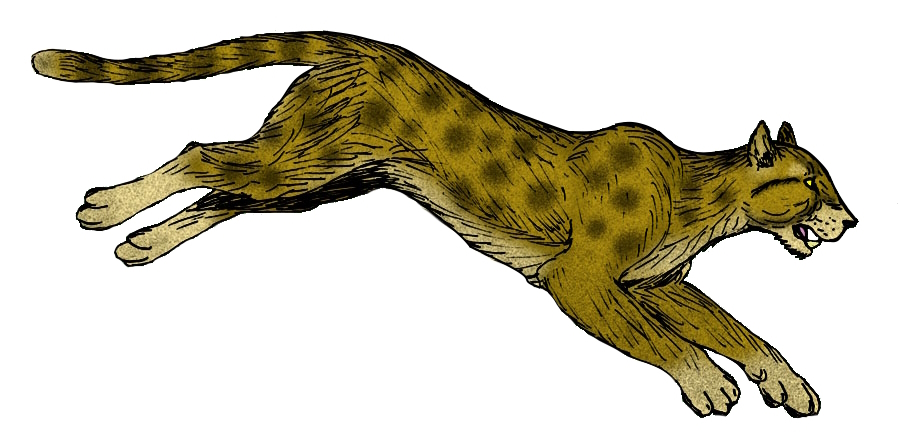
- Restoration of the Pliocene-Pleistocene Miracinonyx, or American cheetah
  †Miracinonyx
  - †Miracinonyx inexpectatus – or unidentified comparable form
- Mustela
- Mycetoporus
- †Mylohyus
  - †Mylohyus fossilis
- Myotis
- Napaeozapus
  - †Napaeozapus insignis
- Natrix
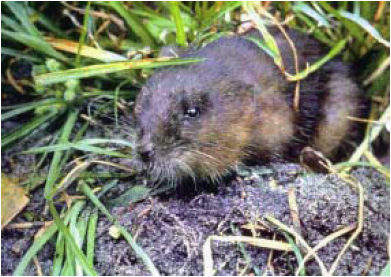
- A living Neofiber, or round-tailed muskrat
  Neofiber
  - †Neofiber diluvianus – type locality for species
- Nerodia
  - †Nerodia sipedon
- Nitidotachinus
  - †Nitidotachinus tachyporoides
- Notaris
  - †Notaris aethiops
- Notiophilus
- Ochthebius
- Odocoileus
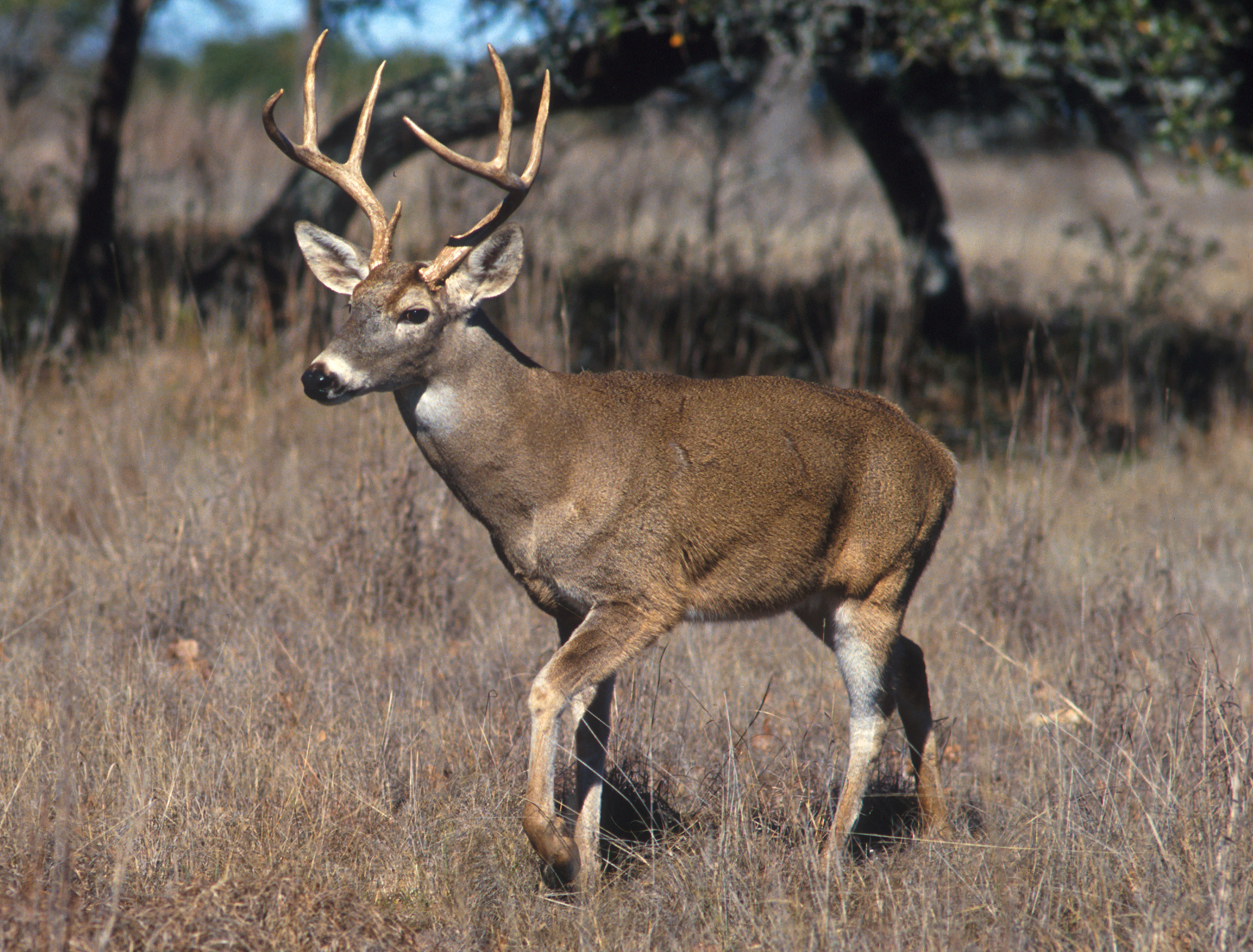
  - A living Odocoileus virginianus, or white-tailed deer
    †Odocoileus virginianus
- Olophrum
  - †Olophrum boreale
  - †Olophrum consimile
  - †Olophrum latum
  - †Olophrum rotundicolle
- Ondatra
  - †Ondatra idahoensis – type locality for species
- Opheodrys
  - †Opheodrys vernalis
- †Osmotherium – type locality for genus
  - †Osmotherium spelaeum – type locality for species
- Oxytelus
- Panthera
  - †Panthera onca
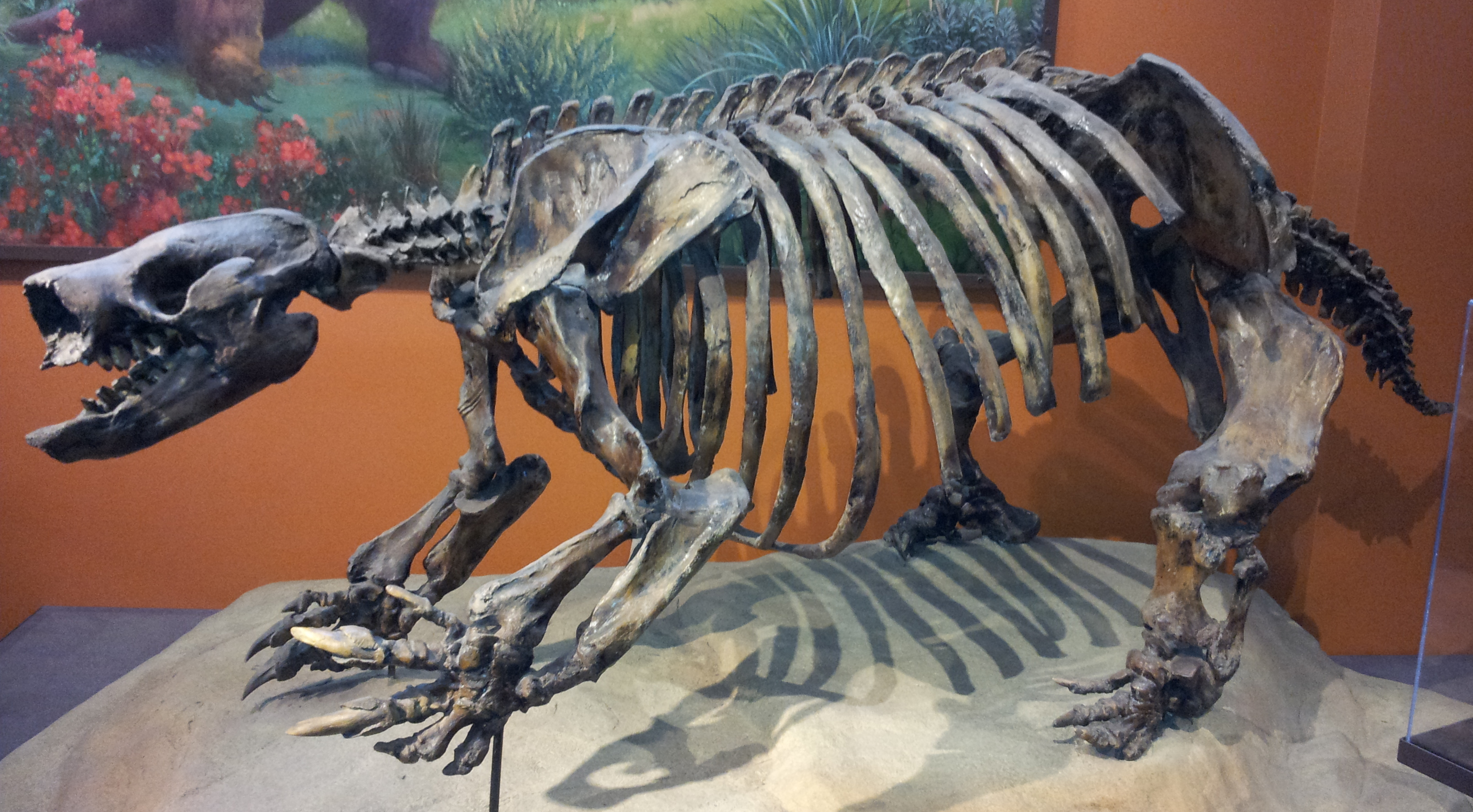
- Fossilized skeleton of the Pliocene-Pleistocene ground sloth Paramylodon
  †Paramylodon
  - †Paramylodon harlani – tentative report
- Parascalops
  - †Parascalops breweri
- Patrobus
  - †Patrobus foveocollis
  - †Patrobus septentrionis
  - †Patrobus stygicus
- Pekania
  - †Pekania diluviana
- Pelenomus
- Peromyscus
  - †Peromyscus leucopus – tentative report
- †Phanaeus
  - †Phanaeus antiquus – type locality for species
- Philonthus
- Phloeotribus
  - †Phloeotribus piceae
- Pitymys
  - †Pitymys cumberlandensis – or unidentified comparable form
- Pityophthorus
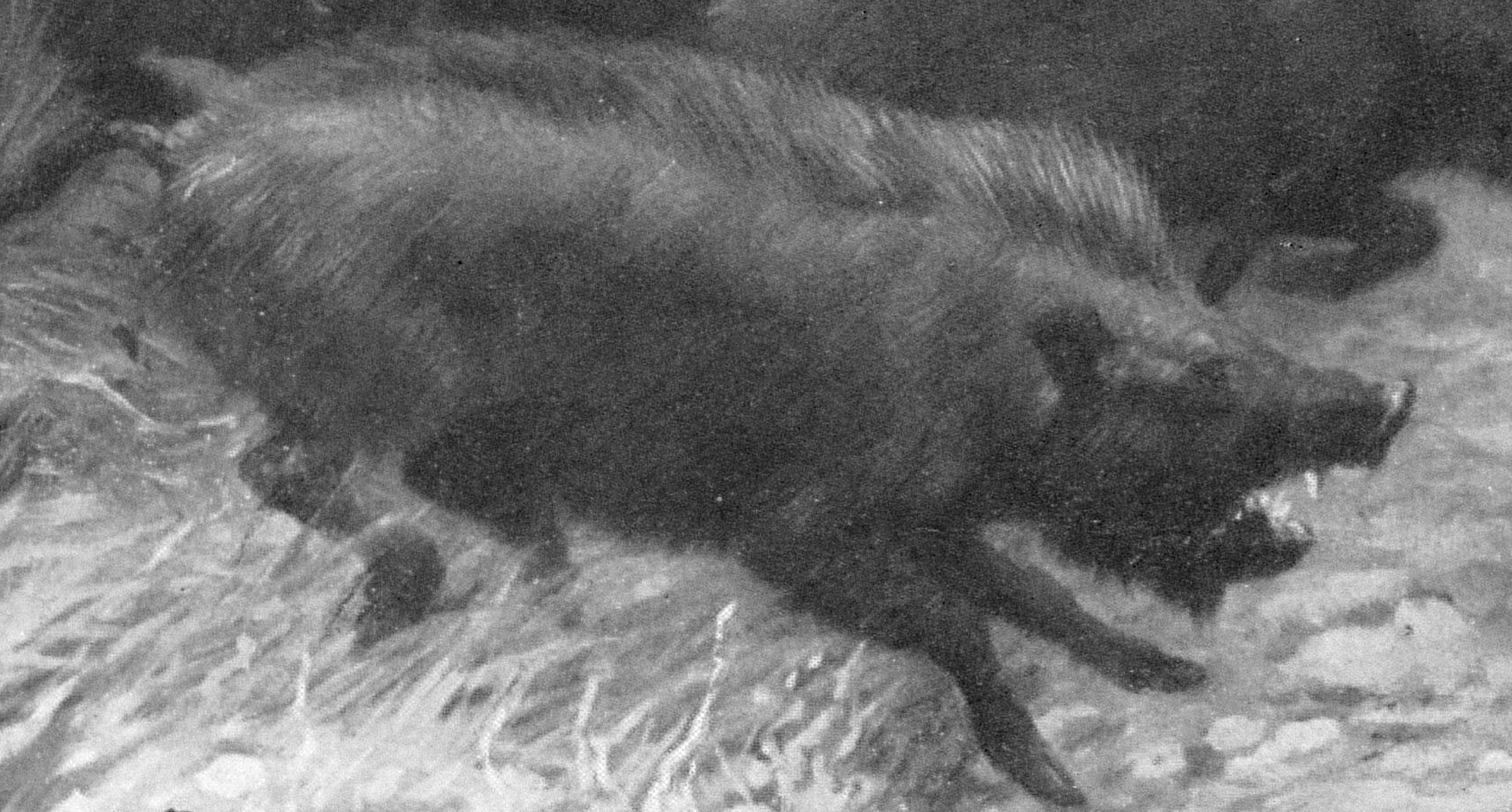
- Restoration of a herd of alarmed Miocene-Pleistocene peccaries of the genus Platygonus. Charles R. Knight (1922).
  †Platygonus
  - †Platygonus vetus – type locality for species
- Platynus
  - †Platynus hypolithos
- Podabrus
- Polygraphus
  - †Polygraphus rufipennis
- Pterostichus
  - †Pterostichus laevigatus – type locality for species
  - †Pterostichus patruelis
  - †Pterostichus punctatissimus
- Pycnoglypta
  - †Pycnoglypta aptera
  - †Pycnoglypta lurida
- Quedius
- †Rana
  - †Rana pipiens – or unidentified comparable form
- Scalopus
- Simplocaria
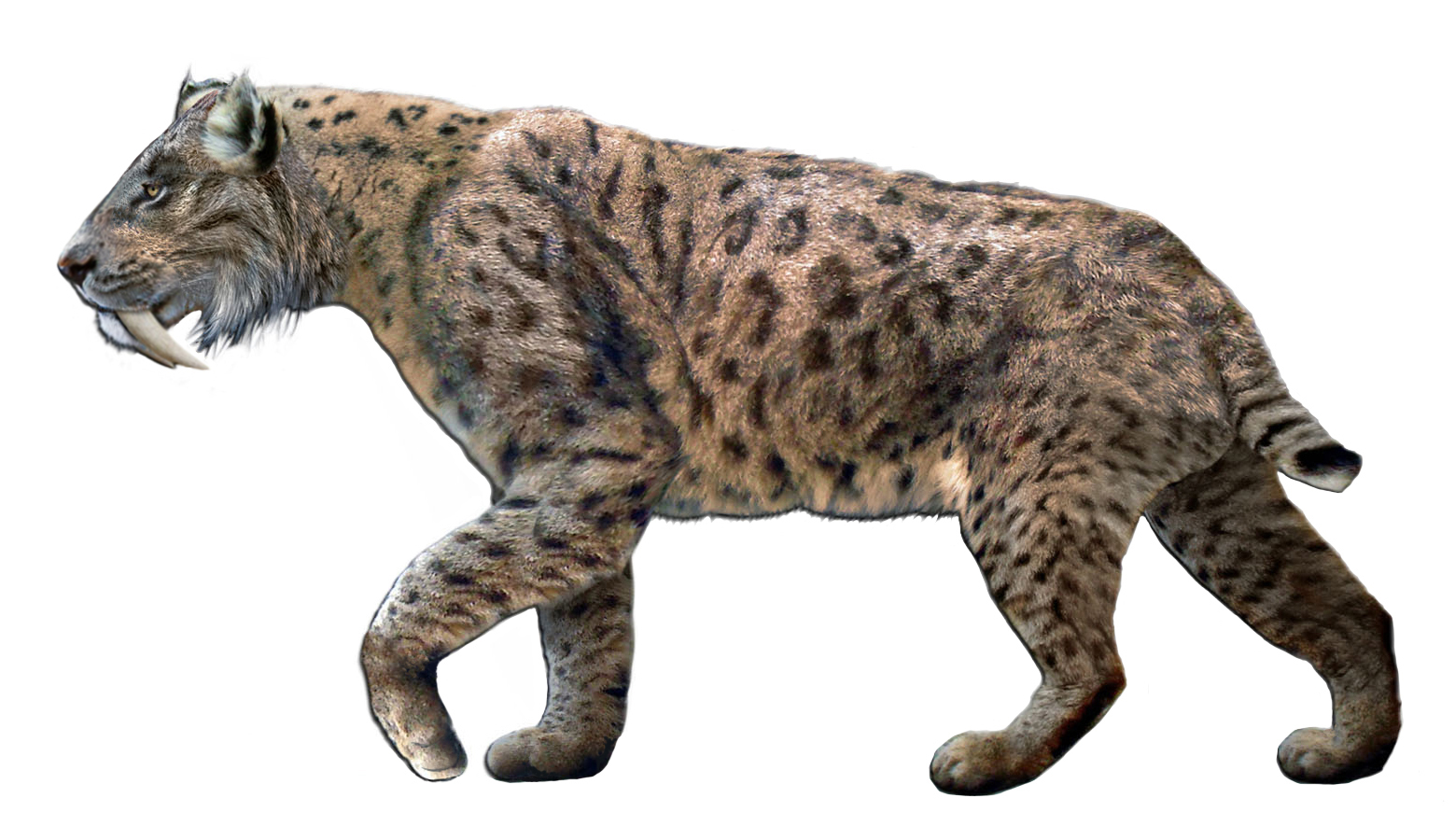
- Life restoration of the Pleistocene-Holocene saber-tooth cat Smilodon
  †Smilodon
  - †Smilodon gracilis – type locality for species
- Sorex
- Sphaeroderus
  - †Sphaeroderus nitidicollis – or unidentified comparable form
- Stenus
- Stereocerus
  - †Stereocerus haematopus
- Sylvilagus
  - †Sylvilagus floridanus
- Synaptomys
  - †Synaptomys cooperi
- Tachinus
  - †Tachinus luridus
- Tamias
  - †Tamias striatus – or unidentified comparable form
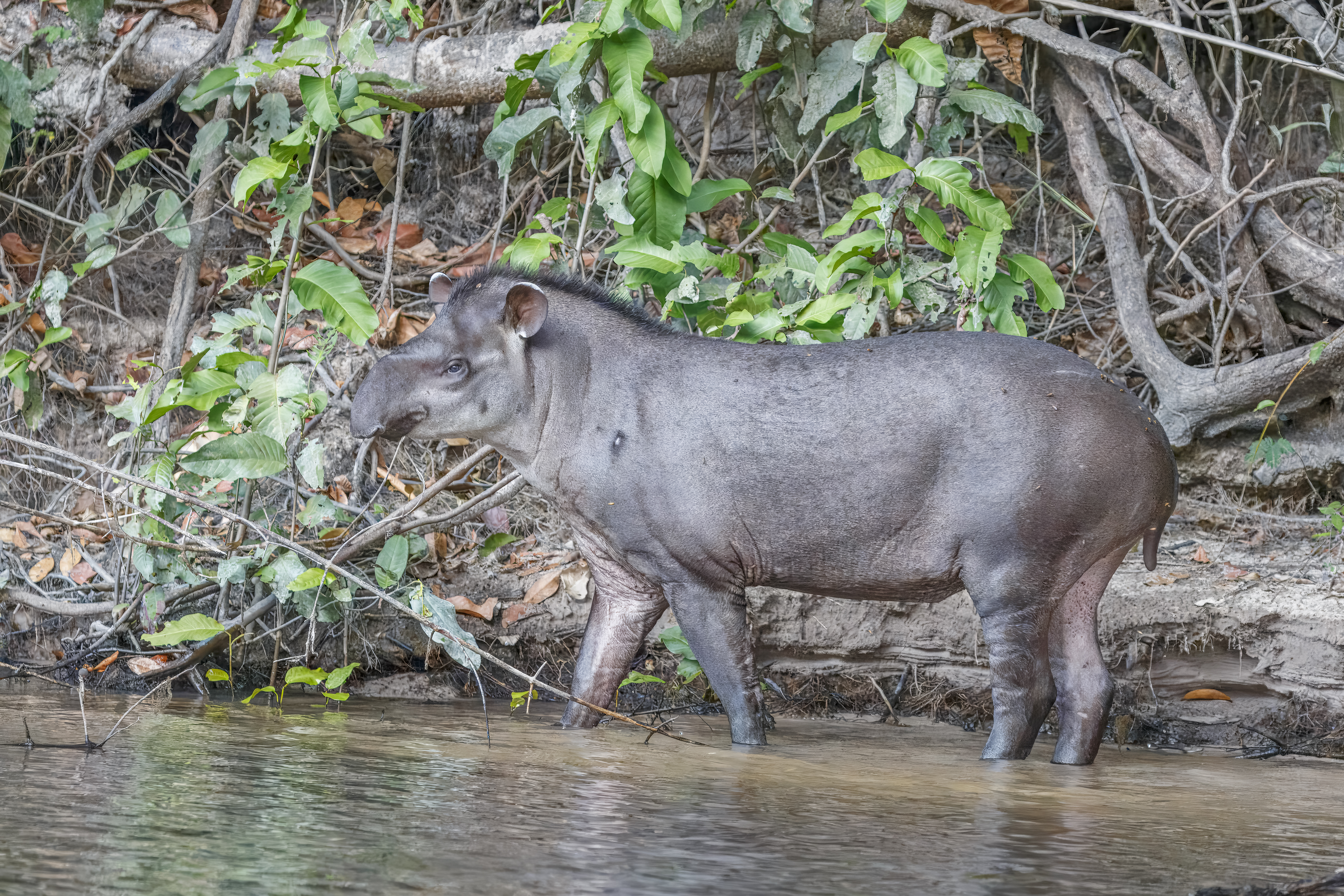
- A living Tapirus, or tapir
  Tapirus
  - †Tapirus haysii
  - †Tapirus veroensis
- Taxidea
  - †Taxidea taxus
- Terrapene
  - †Terrapene carolina
- Thamnophis
- Thanatophilus
- Thomomys
  - †Thomomys potomacensis
- Trechus
  - †Trechus crassiscapus
- †Uncia
  - †Uncia mercerii – type locality for species
- Urocyon
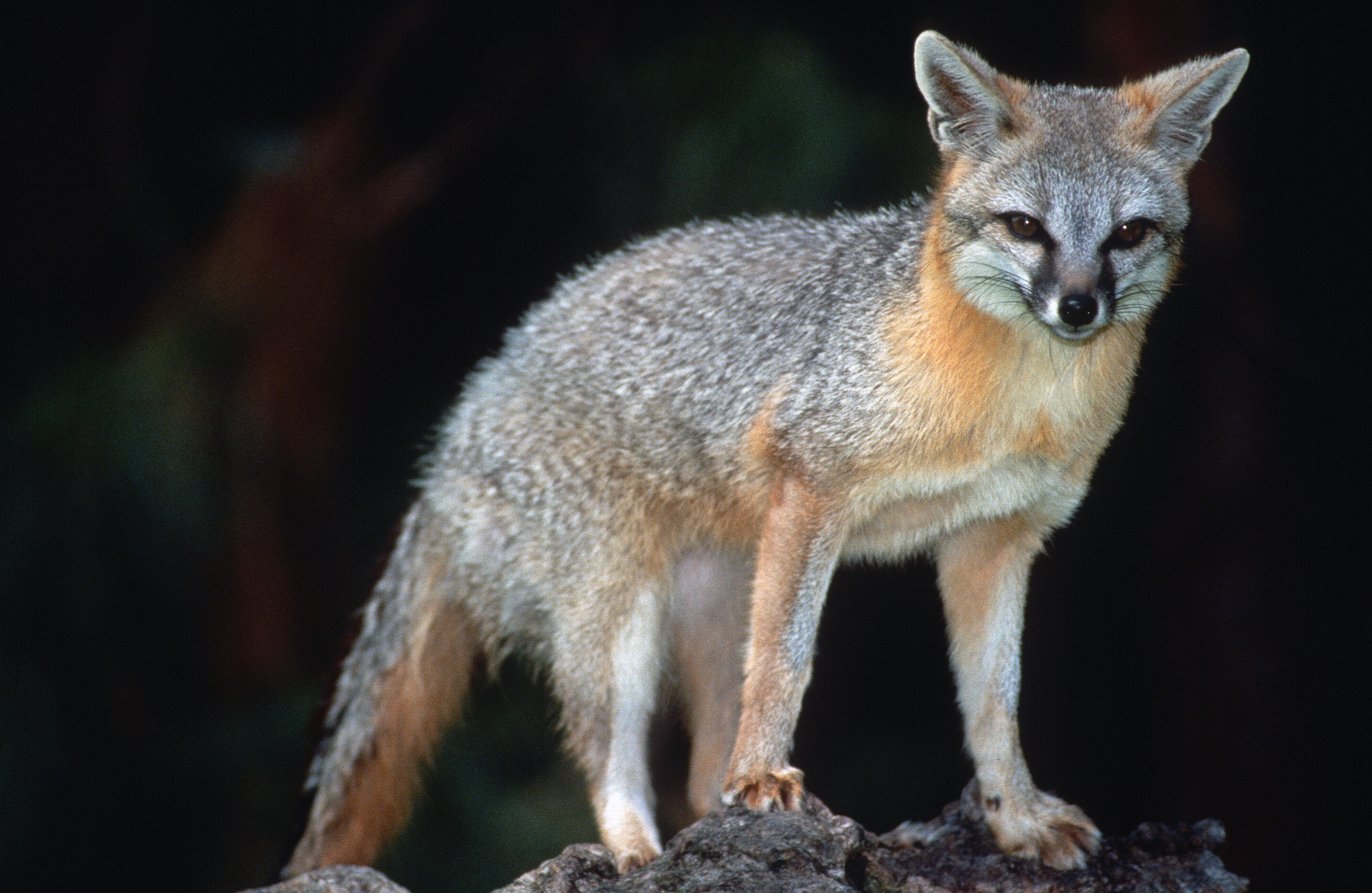
  - A living Urocyon cinereoargenteus, or gray fox
    †Urocyon cinereoargenteus
- Ursus
  - †Ursus americanus
- Vulpes
- Zapus
  - †Zapus hudsonius
