= Diacheila polita =

Scientific classification
- Domain: Eukaryota
- Kingdom: Animalia
- Phylum: Arthropoda
- Class: Insecta
- Order: Coleoptera
- Suborder: Adephaga
- Family: Carabidae
- Genus: Diacheila
- Species: D. polita

Binomial name
- Diacheila polita (Faldermann, 1835)

Species of ground beetle

Diacheila polita is a species of ground beetle in the family Carabidae. It is found in Europe and Northern Asia (excluding China), North America, and Southern Asia.
