= Glenn Lowell Jepsen =

Glenn Lowell "Jep" Jepsen (4 March 1903 – 15 October 1974) was an American paleontologist and professor of vertebrate paleontology at Princeton University. He collected and described many fossil species particularly from the Oligocene of the Badlands of South Dakota and the Paleocene of Polecat Bench, Wyoming. The Eocene bat Icaronycteris index was one of his discoveries.

== Life ==
Jepsen was born in Lead, South Dakota to Victor and Kittie née Gallup. He grew up in Rapid City where following the death of his mother in 1910, he was raised by an aunt on a ranch outside town. Here he found his first fossil, an ammonite. After high school he went to the University of Michigan for a year, and two years at the South Dakota school of Mines as a part-time student as well as serving as an instructor in English. Here he became deeply interested in fossils, collecting from the Oligocene deposits in the Badlands where he met William J. Sinclair. The Sioux tribe of the region called him "Hohu Wichasa" or "Bone-finding man". Jepsen transferred to Princeton University in 1925 on the suggestion of Sinclair, and majored in geology, graduating in 1927. His first paper was on Hoplophoneus oharrai and he continued to study and received a PhD in 1930. He then worked as an instructor and became assistant professor in 1934 and curator of vertebrate paleontology in 1935. He went on several field expeditions and became director of the Museum of Natural History at Princeton in 1940. In 1946 he was made Sinclair professor. During the same year, he discovered fossils of Late Triassic fishes when digging for the foundation of the new Firestone Library of the Princeton University. He helped organize the first international conference on genetics, paleontology and evolution which resulted in a volume co-edited with George Gaylord Simpson and Ernst Mayr. He was elected to the American Philosophical Society in 1949.

Jepsen married Janet Mayo in 1934 and they divorced in 1953. He received the Addison Verrill Medal in 1962 and was a Fellow of the Geological Society of America, and the Paleontological Society of America among others. He retired in 1971 and died from cancer in Princeton. A number of fossil species have been named in his honour including Pronothodectes jepi Gingerich, 1975, Peltosaurus jepseni Gilmore, 1942 and Carinacanthus jepseni Bryant, 1934.
