= Acidota brevis =

Scientific classification
- Domain: Eukaryota
- Kingdom: Animalia
- Phylum: Arthropoda
- Class: Insecta
- Order: Coleoptera
- Suborder: Polyphaga
- Infraorder: Staphyliniformia
- Family: Staphylinidae
- Genus: Acidota
- Species: A. brevis

Binomial name
- Acidota brevis (Assing, 2004)

Species of beetle

Acidota brevis is a species of rove beetles found in Turkey.
