= Stereocerus rubripes =

Scientific classification
- Domain: Eukaryota
- Kingdom: Animalia
- Phylum: Arthropoda
- Class: Insecta
- Order: Coleoptera
- Suborder: Adephaga
- Family: Carabidae
- Genus: Stereocerus
- Species: S. rubripes

Binomial name
- Stereocerus rubripes (Motschulsky, 1860)

Species of beetle

Stereocerus rubripes is a species of woodland ground beetle in the family Carabidae. It is found in Europe and Northern Asia (excluding China) and North America.
