= Tubulella =

Tubulella Temporal range: Burgess Shale

Scientific classification
- Kingdom: Animalia
- Stem group: Cnidaria
- Genus: †Tubulella
- Species: †T. flagellum

Binomial name
- †Tubulella flagellum Matthew, 1899

Extinct genus of marine invertebrates

Tubulella is a genus of stem-group cnidarians from the Burgess Shale.
