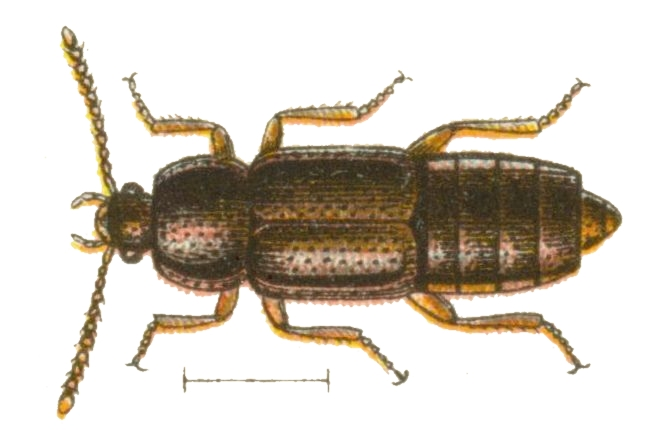

Scientific classification
- Kingdom: Animalia
- Phylum: Arthropoda
- Clade: Pancrustacea
- Class: Insecta
- Order: Coleoptera
- Suborder: Polyphaga
- Infraorder: Staphyliniformia
- Family: Staphylinidae
- Genus: Acidota
- Species: A. crenata

Binomial name
- Acidota crenata (Fabricius, 1792)

Synonyms
- Synonymy: Staphylinus crenatus Fabricius; Acidota heerii Heyden, L.; Acidota japonica Watanabe, Y.; Acidota nigra Scudder; Acidota pulchra Motschulsky; Acidota seriata LeConte, J. L.; Omalium castaneum Gravenhorst; Omalium rufum Gravenhorst

= Acidota crenata =

Species of beetle

Acidota crenata is a species of rove beetles.
