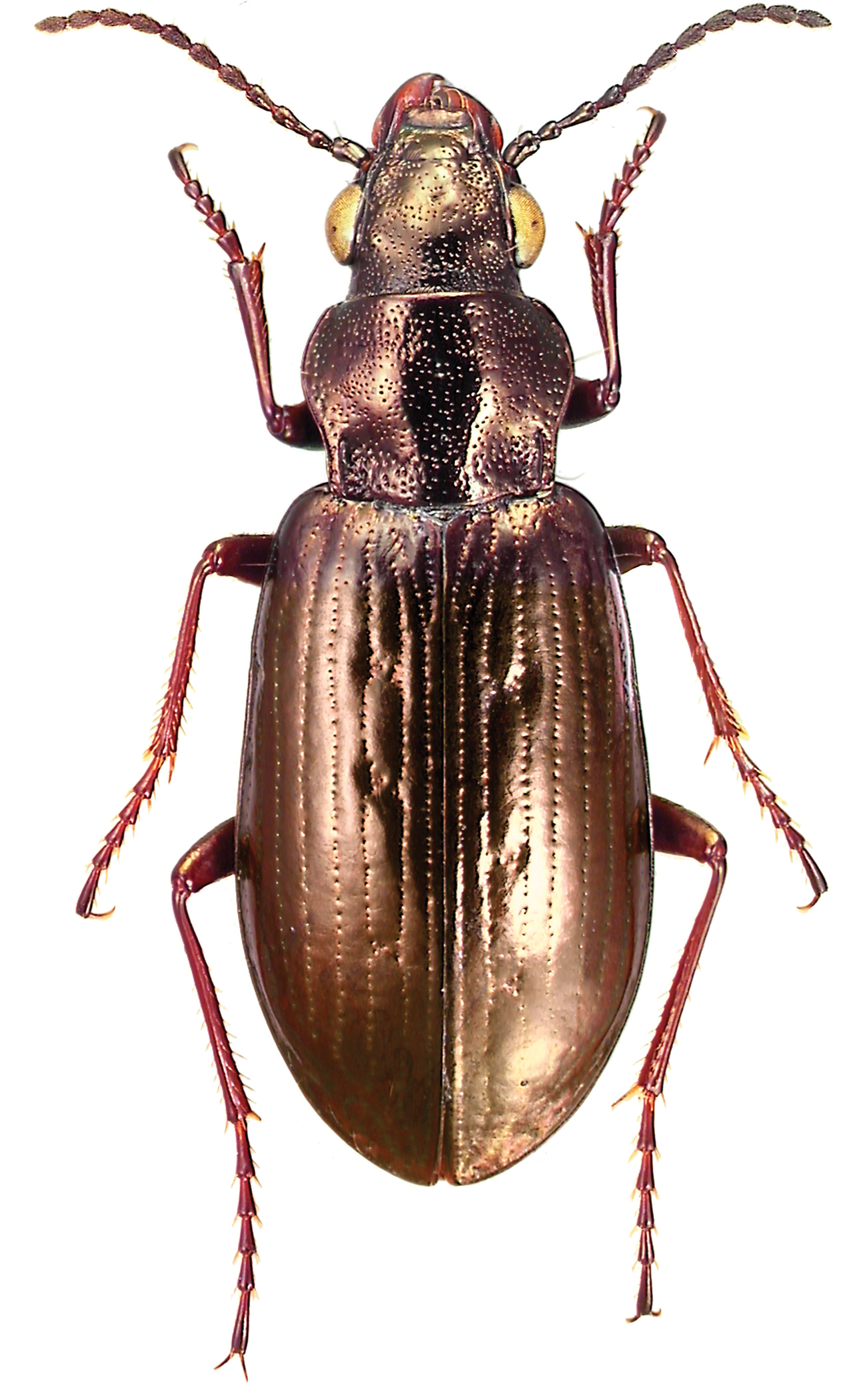
- Diacheila arctica amoena

Scientific classification
- Kingdom: Animalia
- Phylum: Arthropoda
- Class: Insecta
- Order: Coleoptera
- Suborder: Adephaga
- Family: Carabidae
- Subfamily: Elaphrinae
- Genus: Diacheila; Motschulsky, 1844

= Diacheila =

Genus of ground beetle

Diacheila is a genus in the beetle family Carabidae. There are at least four described species in Diacheila.

== Species ==
These four species belong to the genus Diacheila:

- Diacheila arctica (Gyllenhal, 1810) (Holarctic)
- Diacheila fausti Heyden, 1887 (Kazakhstan, Kyrgyzstan, and China)
- Diacheila polita (Faldermann, 1835) (Holarctic)
- † Diacheila matthewsi Böcher, 1995
