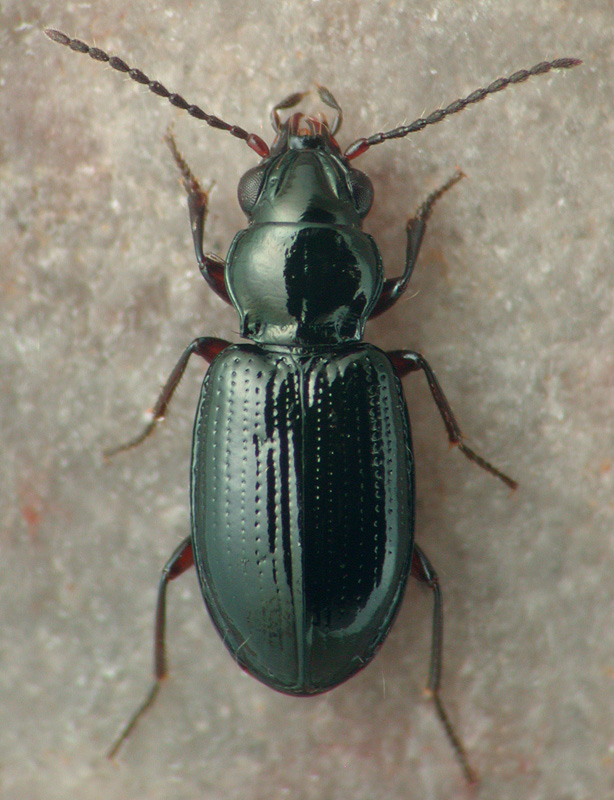

Scientific classification
- Kingdom: Animalia
- Phylum: Arthropoda
- Class: Insecta
- Order: Coleoptera
- Suborder: Adephaga
- Family: Carabidae
- Genus: Bembidion
- Species: B. fortestriatum

Binomial name
- Bembidion fortestriatum (Motschulsky, 1845)

= Bembidion fortestriatum =

Bembidion fortestriatum Temporal range: Late Pleistocene-present

Species of beetle

Bembidion fortestriatum is a species of ground beetle in the family Carabidae. It is found in North America.
