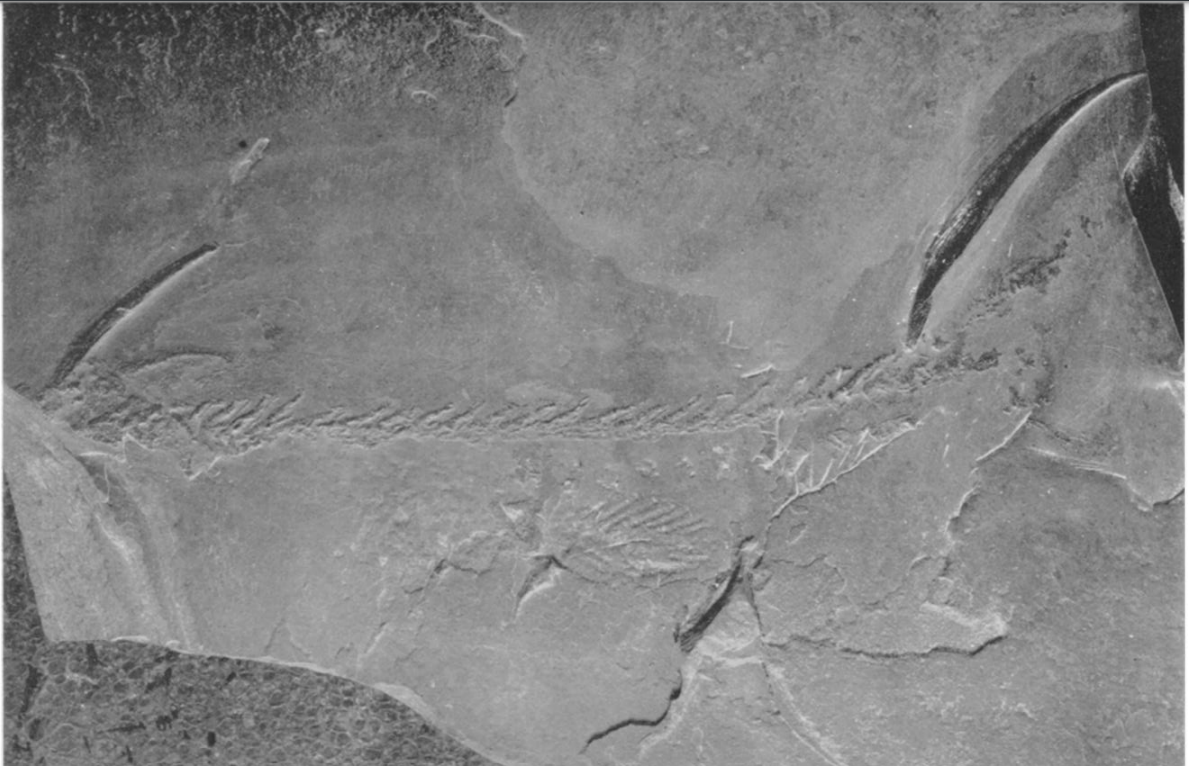
- Type specimen

Scientific classification
- Kingdom: Animalia
- Phylum: Chordata
- Class: Chondrichthyes
- Order: †Hybodontiformes
- Genus: †Carinacanthus; Bryant, 1934
- Species: †C. jepseni

Binomial name
- †Carinacanthus jepseni Bryant, 1934

= Carinacanthus =

Carinacanthus Temporal range: Norian

Extinct genus of cartilaginous fishes

Carinacanthus ("keeled spine") is an extinct genus of small freshwater hybodont shark that inhabited eastern North America during the Triassic period. It contains a single species, C. jepseni from the Late Triassic (Norian)-aged Lockatong Formation of Pennsylvania, USA. It was named after paleontologist Glenn Lowell Jepsen. Some authors consider it a late-surviving ctenacanthiform.

It is a very rare taxon, with only two potential specimens known despite the well-studied nature of the Newark Supergroup deposits. The type specimen consists of a poorly-preserved axial skeleton, only about 130 millimetres (5.1 in) in length, which is missing the head but allows most of the post-cranial anatomy to be known, including the position of its two large spines and the presence of a heterocercal tail. In addition to this type specimen, a second potential specimen is known, consisting of a poorly-preserved head with only the jaw and teeth recognizable.

Despite the poor preservation of the type specimen, it is one of the only Triassic elasmobranchs from the United States to be known from articulated fossils instead of isolated teeth & spines, and was the first Triassic elasmobranch overall to be described from the eastern United States. It and Palaeobates were the only freshwater hybodonts known from the Triassic of the United States for a significant period of time, although more recent studies have also found the presence of small hybodont teeth in North Carolina.

The fossil egg case taxon Chimaerotheca oakesi, described from the Triassic of Massachusetts and attributed to a chimaeroid, may be potentially referable to Carinacanthus, as one of the only other chondrichthyans known from the Newark Supergroup.
