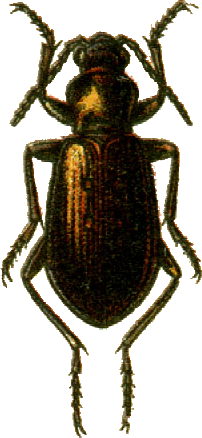

Scientific classification
- Kingdom: Animalia
- Phylum: Arthropoda
- Class: Insecta
- Order: Coleoptera
- Suborder: Adephaga
- Family: Carabidae
- Genus: Diacheila
- Species: D. arctica

Binomial name
- Diacheila arctica (Gyllenhal, 1810)

= Diacheila arctica =

Species of beetle

Diacheila arctica is a species of ground beetle in the family Carabidae. It is found in Europe and Northern Asia (excluding China) and North America.

== Subspecies ==
These two subspecies belong to the species Diacheila arctica:

- Diacheila arctica amoena (Faldermann, 1835)
- Diacheila arctica arctica (Gyllenhal, 1810)
