= Stereocerus haematopus =

Scientific classification
- Kingdom: Animalia
- Phylum: Arthropoda
- Class: Insecta
- Order: Coleoptera
- Suborder: Adephaga
- Family: Carabidae
- Genus: Stereocerus
- Species: S. haematopus

Binomial name
- Stereocerus haematopus (Dejean, 1831)

Species of beetle

Stereocerus haematopus is a species of ground beetle in the family Carabidae. It is found in Europe and Northern Asia (excluding China) and North America. It is most abundant in the Tundra on dry sandy soils in association with Empetrum, and is commonly found with Amara alpina (Lindroth 1961-1969).
