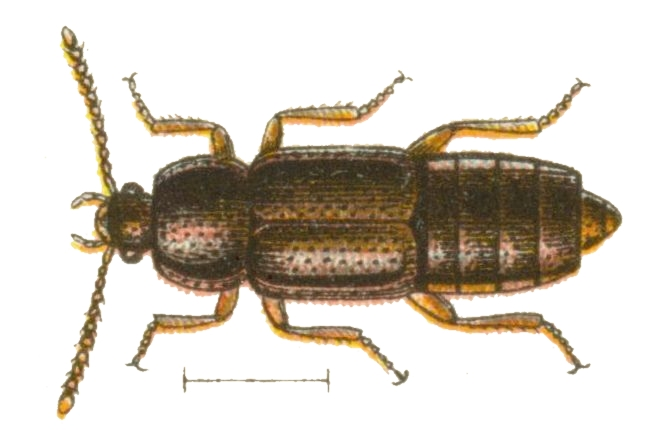
- Acidota crenata

Scientific classification
- Domain: Eukaryota
- Kingdom: Animalia
- Phylum: Arthropoda
- Class: Insecta
- Order: Coleoptera
- Suborder: Polyphaga
- Infraorder: Staphyliniformia
- Family: Staphylinidae
- Subfamily: Omaliinae
- Tribe: Anthophagini
- Genus: Acidota; Stephens, 1829

Synonyms
- Helobium Gistel, 1834

= Acidota =

Genus of beetles

Acidota is a genus of beetles belonging to the family Staphylinidae.

The genus was described in 1829 by James Francis Stephens.

The species of this genus are found in Eurasia and North America.

Species:

- Acidota brevis
- Acidota crenata
- Acidota cruentata
- Acidota daisetsuzana
- Acidota dawai - found in China
- Acidota montana
- Acidota nivicola
- Acidota quadrata
- Acidota semisericea
- Acidota subcarinata
