= Bembidion versicolor =

Scientific classification
- Kingdom: Animalia
- Phylum: Arthropoda
- Class: Insecta
- Order: Coleoptera
- Suborder: Adephaga
- Family: Carabidae
- Genus: Bembidion
- Species: B. versicolor

Binomial name
- Bembidion versicolor (LeConte, 1847)

Synonyms
- Nataphus variegatus Kirby, 1837; Ochthedromus versicolor LeConte, 1847; Bembidion tolerans Casey, 1918; Bembidion terracense Casey, 1924; Bembidion wisconsium Casey, 1924

Species of beetle

Bembidion versicolor is a species of beetle in the family Carabidae. It is found on Saint Pierre and Miquelon, as well as in Canada and the United States.
