= Stereocerus =

Scientific classification
- Kingdom: Animalia
- Phylum: Arthropoda
- Class: Insecta
- Order: Coleoptera
- Suborder: Adephaga
- Family: Carabidae
- Tribe: Pterostichini
- Genus: Stereocerus; Kirby, 1837

Genus of beetles

Stereocerus is a genus of beetles in the family Carabidae, containing the following species:

- Stereocerus haematopus Dejean, 1831
- Stereocerus rubripes Motschulsky, 1860
