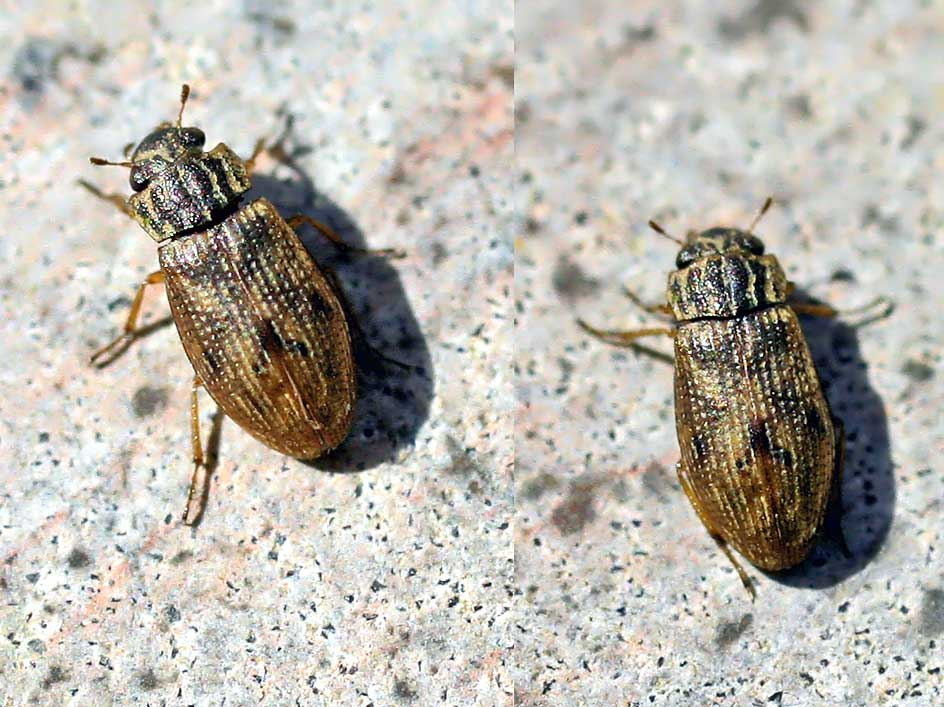
- Helophorus aquaticus

Scientific classification
- Kingdom: Animalia
- Phylum: Arthropoda
- Clade: Pancrustacea
- Class: Insecta
- Order: Coleoptera
- Suborder: Polyphaga
- Infraorder: Staphyliniformia
- Superfamily: Hydrophiloidea
- Family: Helophoridae; Leach, 1815
- Genus: Helophorus; Fabricius, 1775

Species
- see text

= Helophorus =

Helophorus Temporal range: Late Jurassic–Recent

Genus of beetles

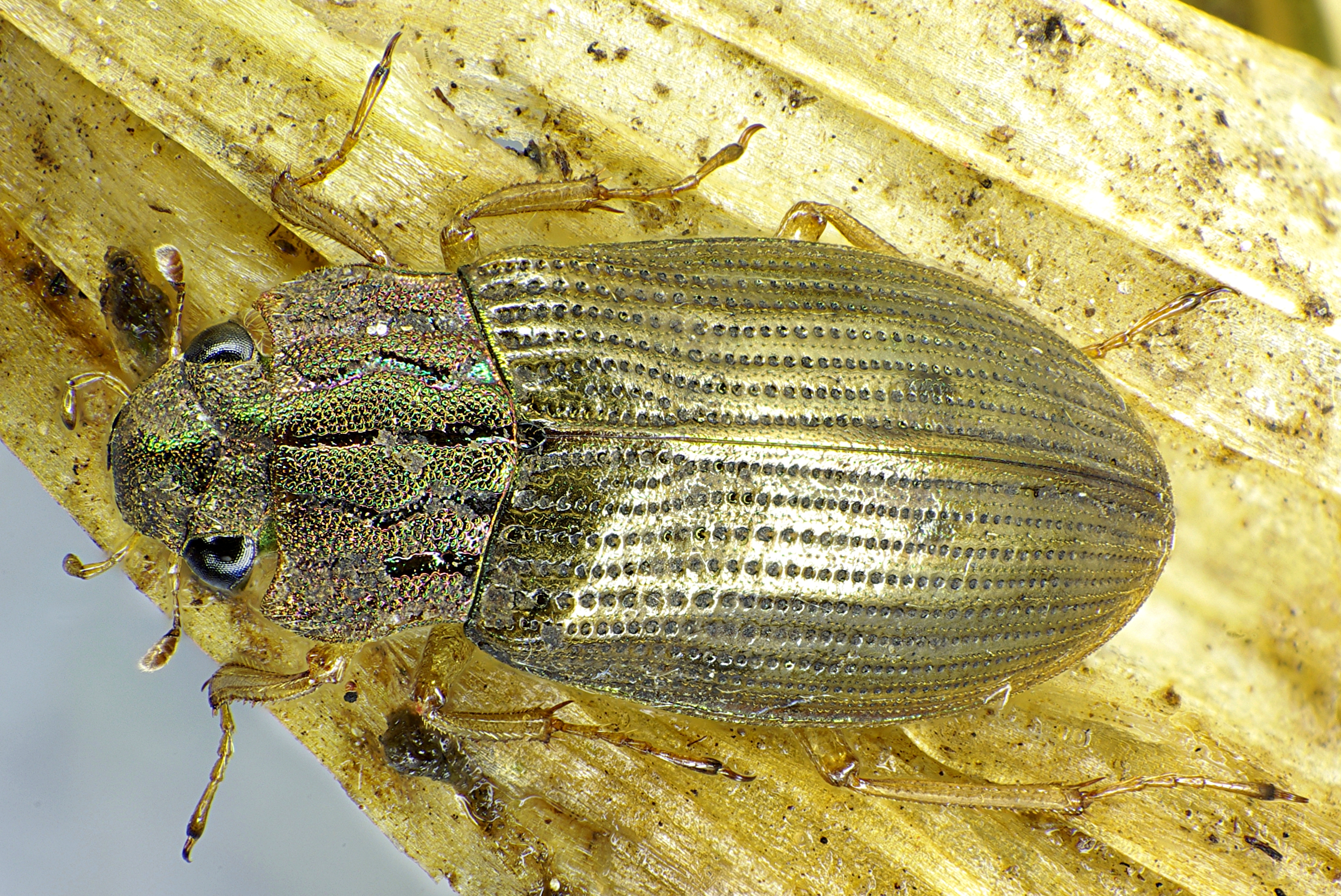
Helophorus grandis

Helophorus is the only genus in the beetle family Helophoridae (traditionally included within Hydrophilidae as the subfamily Helophorinae) within the Hydrophiloidea. They are small insects, found mainly in the Holarctic region (150 occur in Palearctic and 41 species in North America), but two or three species also live in the Afrotropical region, Central America and one in the Indomalayan region (northern India).

== Characteristics ==
Length about 2–9 mm. Body elongate with outline more or less interrupted between pronotum and elytra. On pronotum they have granulate sculpture and unique pattern of 7 longitudinal grooves. Ventral surface is with fine microsculpture, pubescent. Larvae are with long 3 segmented urogomphi and simple (non lobate) 8th tergum. They have four-segmented legs and a 10 segmented abdomen (with the 10th segment being a bit reduced).

== Ecology ==
The majority of Helophorus species adults are aquatic live on the periphery of rivers and streams as well as stagnant bodies of water or pools, though a number are also terrestrial. Adults generally feed on decaying plant material, though some are known to feed on living plant tissue, with several species noted as pests of turnips. The larvae are terrestrial and are predominantly carnivores, though in some species are herviorous, and are pests of turnips, rutabaga, and wheat.

== Systematics and evolution ==
Helophoridae belong to the superfamily Hydrophiloidea, and may be the sister taxon of Hydrochidae, or a clade comprising Hydrochidae, Hydrophilidae and Spercheidae or Georissidae and Epimetopidae. Earlier systems included all of these families in the family Hydrophilidae. The genus is divided into many subgenera (Atracthelophorus, Cyphelophorus, Empleurus, Eutrichelophorus, Gephelophorus, Helophorus, Orphelophorus, Rhopalohelophorus and Transithelophorus). The oldest fossils of Helophorus are from the Late Jurassic of Asia, with the major clades of extant Helophorus likely diverging from each other during the Early Cretaceous.

There are about 180 living species, including:

- Helophorus abeillei
- Helophorus aequalis
- Helophorus alternans
- Helophorus alternatus
- Helophorus angustatus
- Helophorus angusticollis
- Helophorus aquaticus
- Helophorus arcticus
- Helophorus artus
- Helophorus arvernicus
- Helophorus asturiensis
- Helophorus auricollis
- Helophorus barbarae
- Helophorus bergrothi
- Helophorus biltoni
- Helophorus brevipalpis
- Helophorus browni
- Helophorus californicus
- Helophorus carsoni
- Helophorus chamberlaini
- Helophorus columbianus
- Helophorus croaticus
- Helophorus cuspifer
- Helophorus daedalus
- Helophorus difficilis
- Helophorus discrepans
- Helophorus dixoni
- Helophorus dorsalis
- Helophorus eclectus
- Helophorus faustianus
- Helophorus fenderi
- Helophorus flavipes
- Helophorus fortis
- Helophorus frater
- Helophorus frosti
- Helophorus fulgidicollis
- Helophorus furius
- Helophorus glacialis
- Helophorus grandis
- Helophorus granularis
- Helophorus griseus
- Helophorus guttulus
- Helophorus hammondi
- Helophorus hatchi
- Helophorus hilaris
- Helophorus hirsutiventris
- Helophorus inflectus
- Helophorus illustris
- Helophorus jacutus
- Helophorus kaszabianus
- Helophorus kerimi
- Helophorus khnzoryani
- Helophorus kirgisicus
- Helophorus korotyaevi
- Helophorus kozlovi
- Helophorus kryzanovskii
- Helophorus lacustris
- Helophorus lapponicus
- Helophorus laticollis
- Helophorus latipennis
- Helophorus lecontei
- Helophorus ledatus
- Helophorus leechi
- Helophorus leontis
- Helophorus lewisi
- Helophorus liguricus
- Helophorus linearis
- Helophorus linearoides
- Helophorus lineatus
- Helophorus longitarsis
- Helophorus maculatus
- Helophorus marginicollis
- Helophorus mervensis
- Helophorus micans
- Helophorus minutus
- Helophorus montenegrinus
- Helophorus nanus
- Helophorus niger
- Helophorus nigricans
- Helophorus nitiduloides
- Helophorus nitidulus
- Helophorus nubilus
- Helophorus oblongus
- Helophorus obscurus
- Helophorus orchymonti
- Helophorus oregonus
- Helophorus orientalis
- Helophorus pallidipennis
- Helophorus pallidus
- Helophorus parajacutus
- Helophorus paraminutus
- Helophorus paramontanus
- Helophorus paraspelendidus
- Helophorus pitcheri
- Helophorus ponticus
- Helophorus poppii
- Helophorus porculus
- Helophorus pumilio
- Helophorus redtenbacheri
- Helophorus rinki
- Helophorus robertsi
- Helophorus rufipes
- Helophorus schoedli
- Helophorus schuhi
- Helophorus sempervarians
- Helophorus sibiricus
- Helophorus similes
- Helophorus smetanai
- Helophorus splendidus
- Helophorus strandi
- Helophorus strigifrons
- Helophorus subarcuatus
- Helophorus subcarinatus
- Helophorus syriacus
- Helophorus terminassianae
- Helophorus tuberculatus
- Helophorus tumidus
- Helophorus uvarovi
- Helophorus zagrosicus
