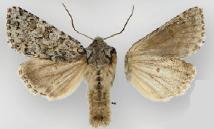
- Male
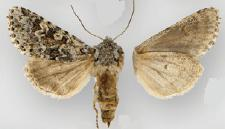
- Female

Scientific classification
- Kingdom: Animalia
- Phylum: Arthropoda
- Class: Insecta
- Order: Lepidoptera
- Superfamily: Noctuoidea
- Family: Noctuidae
- Genus: Psammopolia
- Species: P. arietis

Binomial name
- Psammopolia arietis (Grote, 1879)

Synonyms
- Mamestra arietis Grote, 1879; Lasionycta arietis McDunnough, 1938; Anarta etacta Smith in Dyar, 1900

= Psammopolia arietis =

Species of moth

Psammopolia arietis is a moth of the family Noctuidae. It occurs on Pacific Coast sand beaches from Mendocino, California to south-western Alaska. It is absent from the inland Strait of Georgia.

Adults are on wing from late July to early September.

The larvae live in sand dunes and feed on Lathyrus littoralis, Polygonum paronychia, Abronia latifolia and an unspecified grass.
