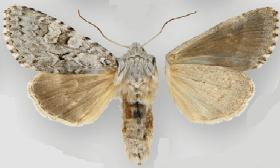

Scientific classification
- Kingdom: Animalia
- Phylum: Arthropoda
- Clade: Pancrustacea
- Class: Insecta
- Order: Lepidoptera
- Superfamily: Noctuoidea
- Family: Noctuidae
- Genus: Psammopolia
- Species: P. wyatti

Binomial name
- Psammopolia wyatti (Barnes & Benjamin, 1926)

Synonyms
- Polia wyatti (Barnes & Benjamin, 1926); Lasionycta wyatti (McDunnough, 1938)

= Psammopolia wyatti =

Species of moth

Psammopolia wyatti is a moth of the family Noctuidae first described by William Barnes and Foster Hendrickson Benjamin in 1926. It occurs in western North America from southern Oregon to the Queen Charlotte Islands of British Columbia. The moth has been included in both 1983 and 2010 MONA indices.

Adults fly over sand beaches, are nocturnal, and come to light.

Adults are on wing from late May to early September.

The larvae feed on Polygonum paronychia, Abronia latifolia, Tanacetum camphoratum and grass.
