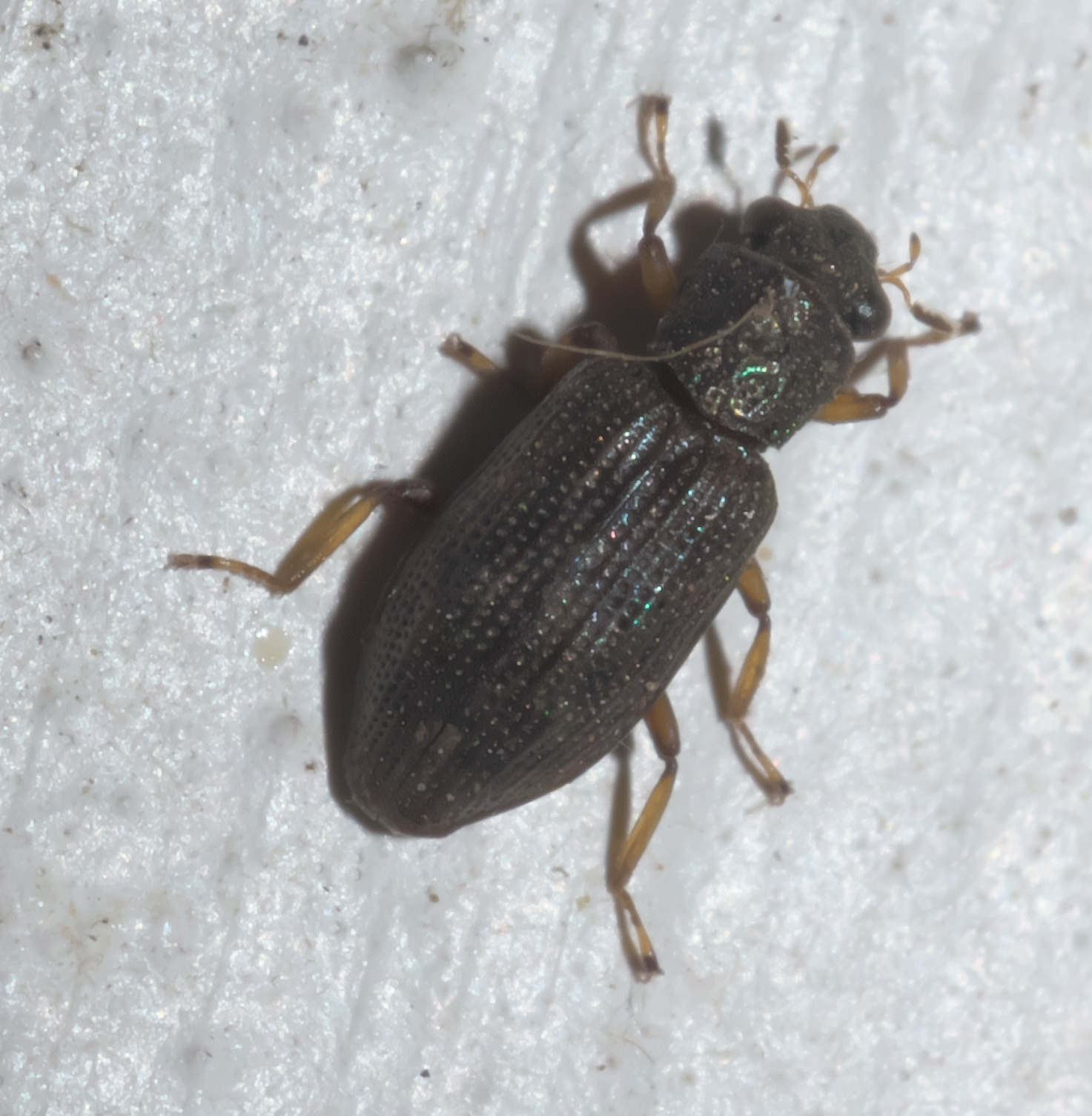

Scientific classification
- Kingdom: Animalia
- Phylum: Arthropoda
- Clade: Pancrustacea
- Class: Insecta
- Order: Coleoptera
- Suborder: Polyphaga
- Infraorder: Staphyliniformia
- Superfamily: Hydrophiloidea
- Family: Hydrochidae; Thomson, 1859
- Genus: Hydrochus; Leach, 1817

Synonyms
- Hydrocus Provancher, 1877 (Missp.); Hydrochous Bedel, 1881 (Missp.); Kiransus Makhan, 1994; Deepakius Makhan, 1998; Amrishius Makhan, 1998; Rishwanius Makhan, 1998; Rishihydroius Makhan, 2001; Aschius Makhan, 2002; Satishius Makhan, 2002; Soesilius Makhan, 2002

= Hydrochus =

Hydrochus Temporal range: Eocene–Recent

Genus of beetles

Hydrochus is the only living genus of beetle in the family Hydrochidae, which belongs to the superfamily Hydrophiloidea, and was formerly treated as a subfamily of Hydrophilidae. Hydrochus includes about 180 species, which are found worldwide. The name "Hydrochus" has also been used for a fly genus in the family Dolichopodidae, but this is a junior subjective synonym of the genus Rhaphium.

They are found in slow moving streams or stagnant water bodies, where they are associated with dense vegetation. In adults air is stored in a bubble on the underside of the body, with the antennae used to transfer atmospheric air to the bubble. The larvae live at the bottom of water bodies, indicating that they can breathe underwater. The diet is only known for the larvae of one species, H. japonicus, which feed on annelid worms belonging the family Naididae. The larvae also burrow into crevices, such as hollow dead grass, including to pupate. The adults are sluggish crawlers along surfaces, and are thought to consume algae and plant detritus. Eggs are laid in silk cases, often attached to (usually plant) substrates.

The club of the seven segmented antennae consists of three segments with a cup-like basal segment. The number of tarsi on the legs are usually 5-5-5 or 4-4-4 (a tiny basal segment can be hard to see). The pronotum narrows towards the rear but is narrower than the base of the elytra. An African species was formerly described under the genus Kiransus, but along with several other African species, it is now placed in Hydrochus. Hydrochids are considered to be an older branch of the Hydrophiloidea. Hydrochids have been suggested as a sister group of the Spercheidae and Hydrophilidae, but the relationships are unclear. Molecular phylogenetic comparisons suggest that they are related as a sister group to Helophorus and Georissus.

The oldest fossil of the modern genus is Hydrochus relictus from the Green River Formation of North America, dating to the Eocene. An extinct genus of the family, Ponohydrochus, is known from the Early Cretaceous (Hauterivian) Khasurty locality in Russia.

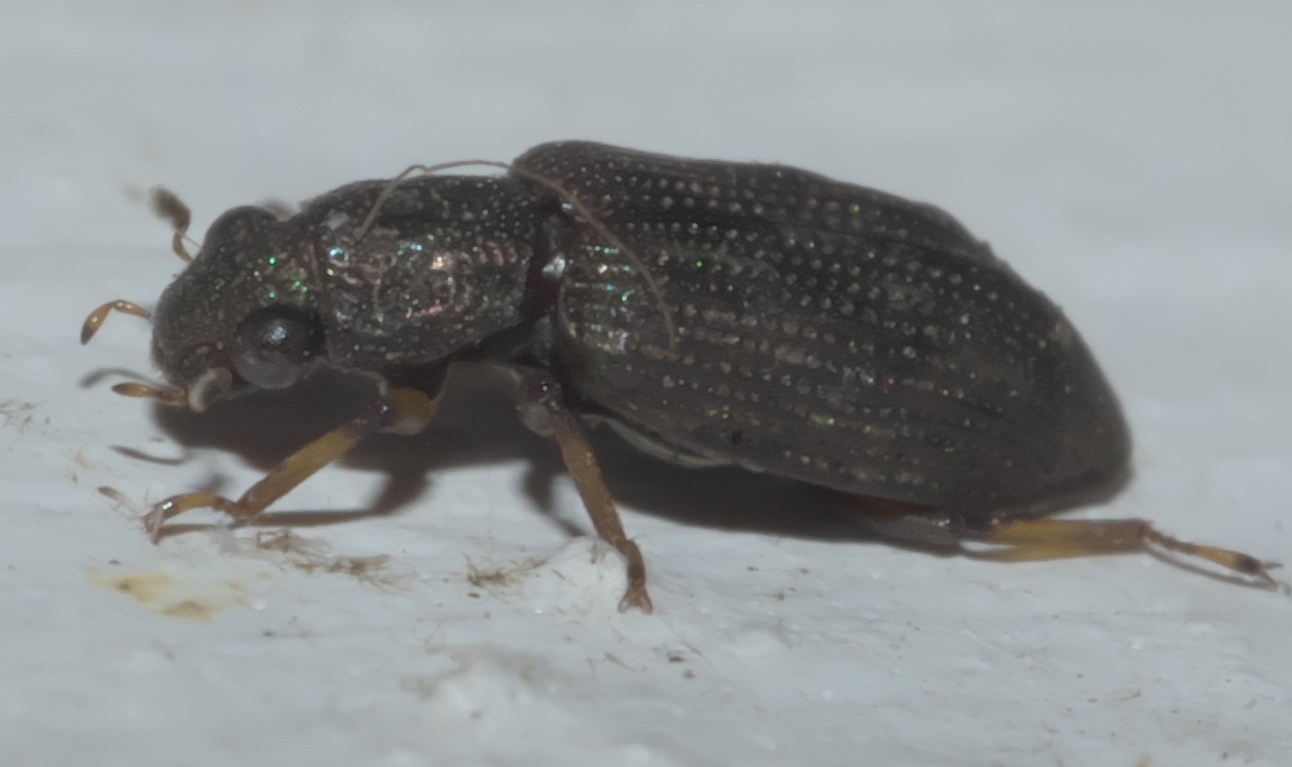

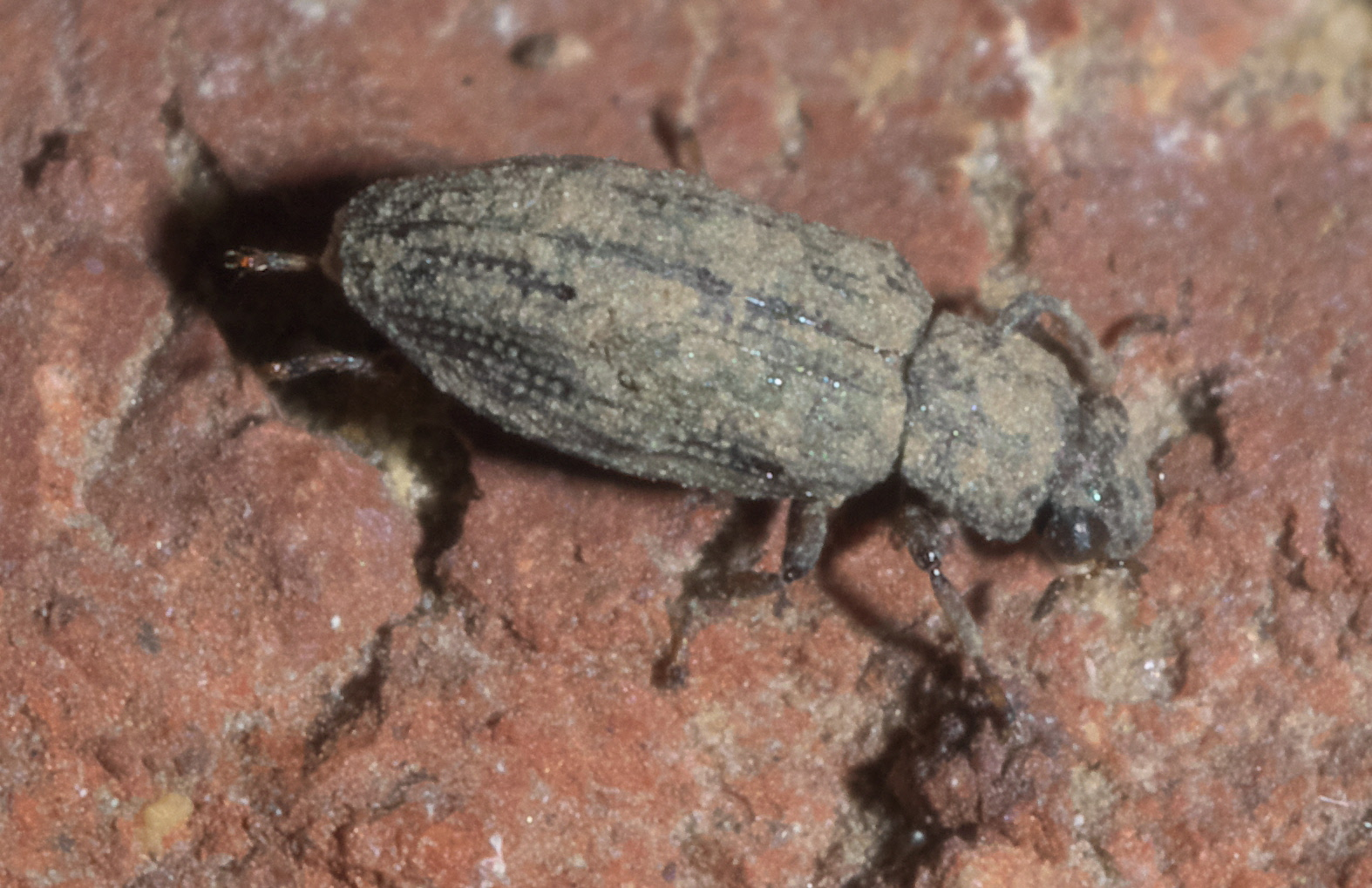

== Selected species ==
More than 180 species have been described in the genus. The following list includes some of the species in the genus:

- Hydrochus aljibensis Castro & Delgado, 1999^{g}
- Hydrochus angusi Valladares, 1988^{g}
- Hydrochus angustatus Germar, 1824^{g}
- Hydrochus argutissimus Perkins, 2019
- Hydrochus aschnaae (Makhan, 1994)
- Hydrochus basilaris Perkins, 2019
- Hydrochus bicarinatus Perkins, 2019
- Hydrochus bituberculatus Perkins, 2019
- Hydrochus brevis (Herbst, 1793)^{g}
- Hydrochus brevitarsis Knisch, 1922^{i c g}
- Hydrochus brianbrowni Makhan, 2005^{i c g}
- Hydrochus callosus LeConte, 1855^{i c g}
- Hydrochus collaris Perkins, 2019
- Hydrochus conjunctus Perkins, 2019
- Hydrochus corruscans Perkins, 2019
- Hydrochus crenatus (Fabricius, 1792)^{g}
- Hydrochus currani Brown, 1929^{i c g b}
- Hydrochus debilis Sharp, 1882^{i c g}
- Hydrochus denarius Perkins, 2019
- Hydrochus drakei Knisch, 1921^{g}
- Hydrochus elongatus (Schaller, 1783)^{g}
- Hydrochus ensifer Hansen, 1998
- Hydrochus excavatus LeConte, 1855^{i c g b}
- Hydrochus falsus Hellman in Worthington, Hellman, and Lago 2016
- Hydrochus farsicus^{g}
- Hydrochus flavipennis Küster, 1852^{g}
- Hydrochus formosus Perkins, 2019
- Hydrochus foveatus Haldeman, 1852^{i c g}
- Hydrochus grandicollis Kiesenwetter, 1870^{g}
- Hydrochus granulatus Blatchley, 1910^{i c g b}
- Hydrochus hellmani Perkins, 2019
- Hydrochus ibericus Valladares, Diaz & Delgado, 1999^{g}
- Hydrochus ignicollis Motschulsky, 1860^{g}
- Hydrochus inaequalis LeConte, 1855
- Hydrochus jaechi Makhan, 1995^{i c g}
- Hydrochus japonicus Sharp, 1873^{g}
- Hydrochus jiawanae Makhan, 1996^{i c g}
- Hydrochus kellymilleri Perkins, 2019
- Hydrochus kirgisicus Motschulsky, 1860^{g}
- Hydrochus lachmoni Makhan, 1996
- Hydrochus leei Perkins, 2019
- Hydrochus lobatus Perkins, 2019
- Hydrochus mauriciogarciai Perkins, 2019
- Hydrochus megaphallus van Berge Henegouwen, 1988^{g}
- Hydrochus minimus Blatchley, 1919^{i c g}
- Hydrochus neosquamifer Smetana, 1988^{i c g}
- Hydrochus nigeriensis Hansen, 1998
- Hydrochus niloticus Sharp, 1903
- Hydrochus nitidicollis Mulsant, 1844^{g}
- Hydrochus nodulifer Reitter, 1897
- Hydrochus nooreinus Berge Henegouwen & Sainz-Cantero, 1992^{g}
- Hydrochus obscurus Sharp, 1882^{i c g}
- Hydrochus octocarinatus Hochhuth, 1871^{g}
- Hydrochus pajnii Makhan, 2000^{i c g}
- Hydrochus pallipes Chevrolat, 1863^{i c g}
- Hydrochus pictus Perkins, 2019
- Hydrochus pseudosecretus Oliva, 1996
- Hydrochus pseudosquamifer Miller, 1965^{i c g b}
- Hydrochus pupillus Orchymont, 1939^{g}
- Hydrochus ramcharani Makhan, 1992
- Hydrochus roomylae Makhan, 2001^{i c g}
- Hydrochus rishwani Makhan, 1994
- Hydrochus rufipes Melsheimer, 1844^{i c g b}
- Hydrochus rugosus Mulsant, 1844^{i c g b}
- Hydrochus sagittarius Perkins, 2019
- Hydrochus scabratus Mulsant, 1844^{i c g b}
- Hydrochus schereri Makhan, 1995^{i c g}
- Hydrochus setosus Leech, 1948^{i c g}
- Hydrochus shorti Perkins, 2019
- Hydrochus simplex Leconte, 1851^{i c g b}
- Hydrochus soekhnandanae Makhan 1992
- Hydrochus smaragdineus Fairmaire, 1879^{g}
- Hydrochus spangleri Hellman in Steiner, Staines, McCann and Hellman, 2003^{i c g}
- Hydrochus squamifer LeConte, 1855^{i c g b}
- Hydrochus subcupreus Randall, 1838^{i c g b}
- Hydrochus tariqi Ribera, Hernando & Aguilera, 1999^{g}
- Hydrochus tarsalis Chevrolat, 1863^{i c g}
- Hydrochus vagus LeConte, 1852^{i c g}
- Hydrochus tuberculatus Hansen, 1998
- Hydrochus variabiloides Perkins, 2019
- Hydrochus variolatus LeConte, 1851^{i c g}
- Hydrochus yadavi Makhan, 2000^{i c g}

Data sources: i = ITIS, c = Catalogue of Life, g = GBIF, b = Bugguide.net
