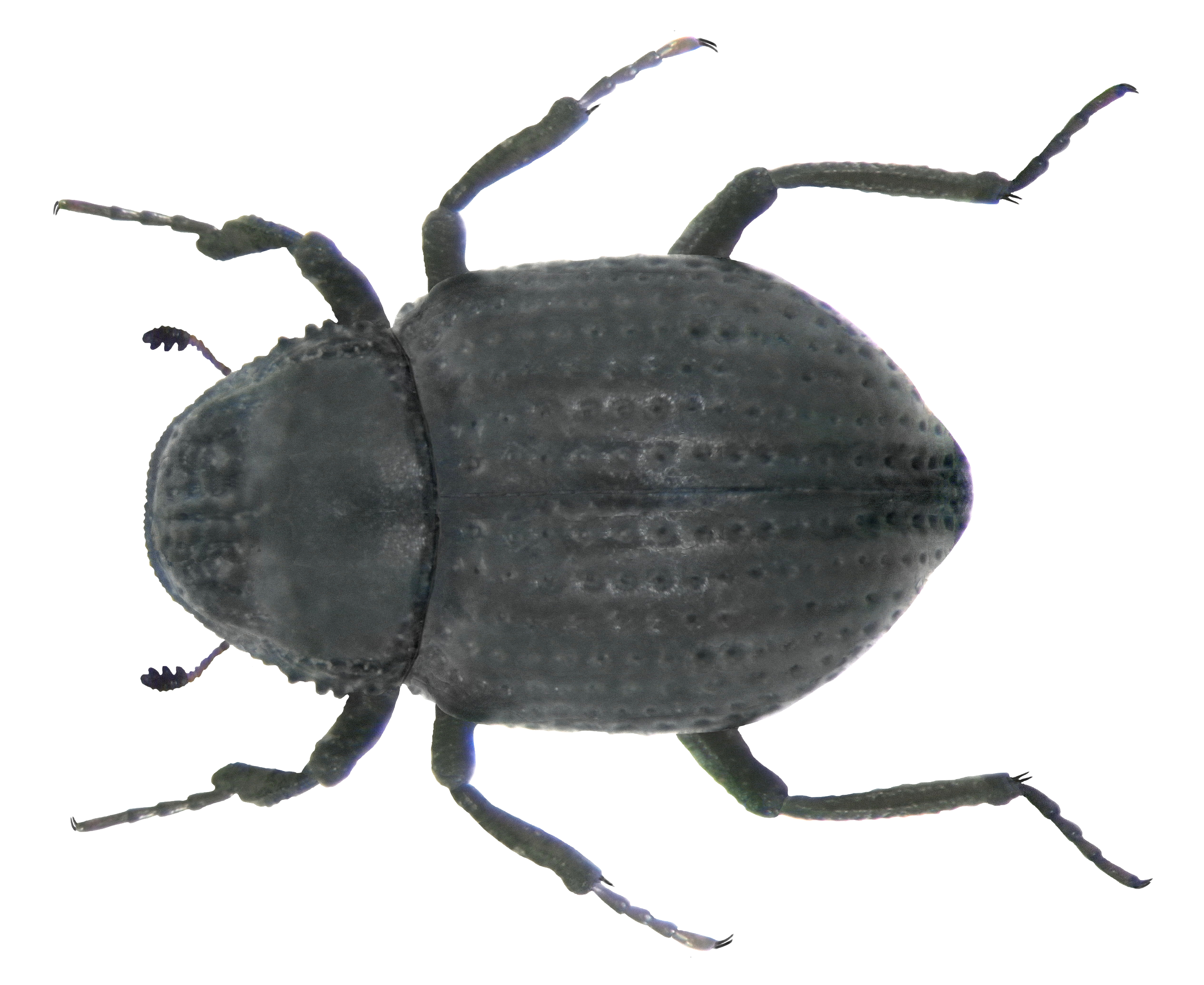
- G. crenulatus

Scientific classification
- Kingdom: Animalia
- Phylum: Arthropoda
- Clade: Pancrustacea
- Class: Insecta
- Order: Coleoptera
- Suborder: Polyphaga
- Infraorder: Staphyliniformia
- Superfamily: Hydrophiloidea
- Family: Georissidae; Laporte, 1840
- Genus: Georissus; Latreille, 1809

Species
- see text

Synonyms
- Georyssus Stephens, 1828 (Unjustified Emendation)

= Georissus =

Genus of beetles

Georissus, also called minute mud-loving beetles, is the only genus in the beetle family Georissidae (or Georyssidae). They are tiny insects living in wet soil, often near water. They are found on every continent except Antarctica.

== Characteristics ==
Georissidae are small beetles (length 1–2 mm). They have a broadly oval body whose outline is more or less interrupted between the pronotum and the elytra. The head and pronotum are granulate, the prosternum is rudimentary, without intercoxal processes. The anterior coxae and trochanters are fused. The basal ventrite is very large.

== Ecology ==
Species are generally found within mud and sand at the periphery of rivers and streams, but also occur in tropical rainforest leaf litter. Species of Georissus are predators on invertebrates, and under laboratory conditions sometimes engage in cannibalism. Species within the genus are known for their habit of psammophory (actively covering their elytra with sand or mud) which helps protect them against predators.

== Systematics and evolution ==
There are about 75 living species, including:

- Georissus australis
- Georissus babai
- Georissus bipartitus
- Georissus caelatus
- Georissus californicus
- Georissus canalifer
- Georissus capitatus
- Georissus coelosternus
- Georissus costatus
- Georissus crenulatus
- Georissus formosanus
- Georissus fusicornis
- Georissus granulosus
- Georissus instabilis
- Georissus japonicus
- Georissus kingii
- Georissus kurosawai
- Georissus laesicollis
- Georissus minusculus
- Georissus occidentalis
- Georissus pusillus
- Georissus sakaii
- Georissus septemcostatus
- Georissus substriatus
- Georissus trifossulatus

The genus is divided into three subgenera (Georissus, Neogeorissus and Nipponogeorissus). Formerly it was included within the family Hydrophilidae. Recent molecular data indicate, that they belong to a clade comprising the small groups of Hydrophiloidea - Epimetopidae, Hydrochidae, Helophoridae and Georissidae.
