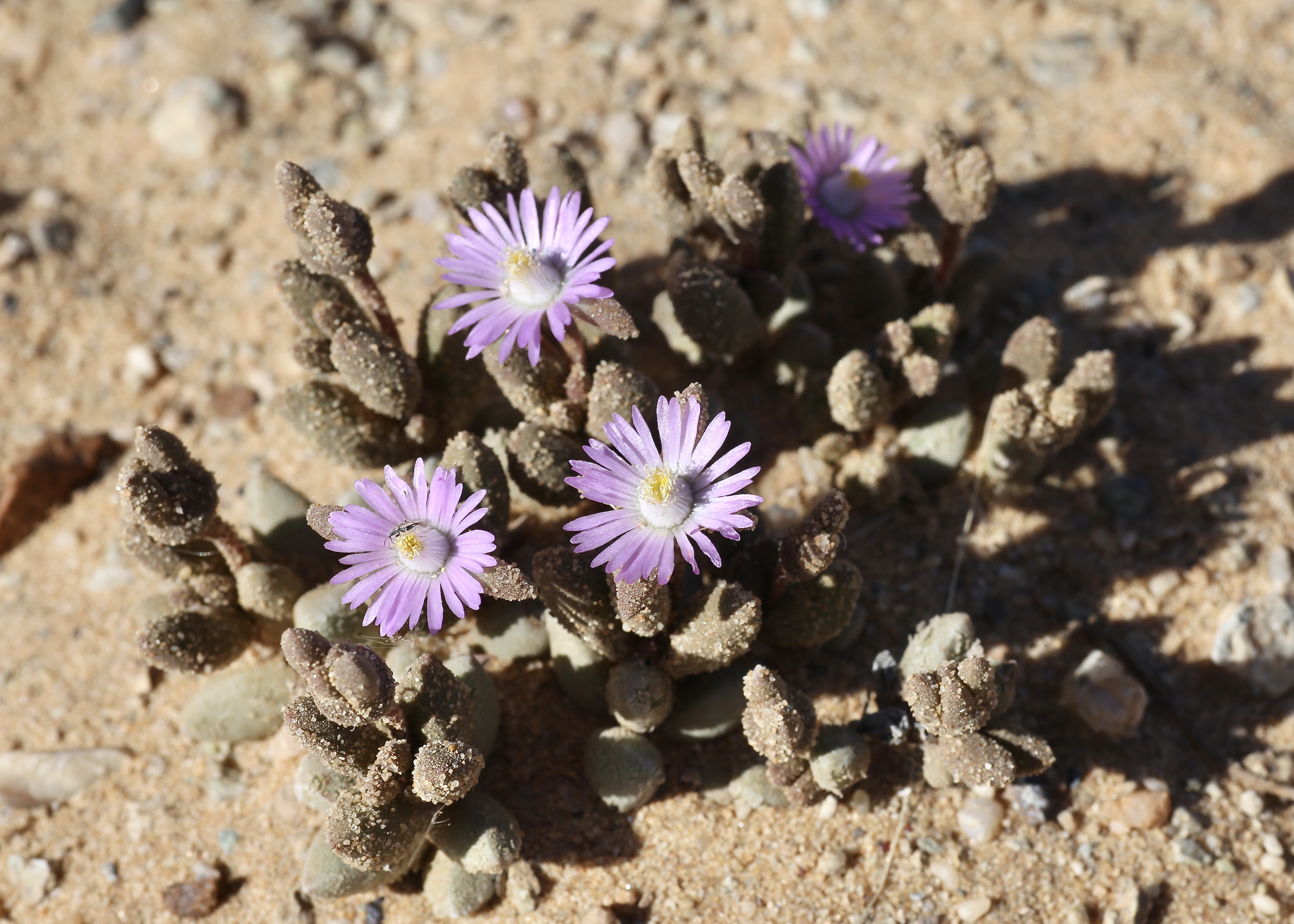
- Psammophora modesta in ǀAi-ǀAis/Richtersveld Transfrontier Park.

Scientific classification
- Kingdom: Plantae
- Clade: Tracheophytes
- Clade: Angiosperms
- Clade: Eudicots
- Order: Caryophyllales
- Family: Aizoaceae
- Subfamily: Ruschioideae
- Tribe: Ruschieae
- Genus: Psammophora; Dinter & Schwantes

= Psammophora =

Genus of succulents

Psammophora is a genus of plant in the family Aizoaceae. It is native to Namibia and the Cape Provinces of South Africa.

It contains the following species:

- Psammophora longifolia L. Bolus
- Psammophora modesta (Dinter & A. Berger) Dinter & Schwantes
- Psammophora nissenii (Dinter) Dinter & Schwantes (type species)
- Psammophora saxicola H.E.K.Hartmann

Plants in this genus are known for their ability to entrap sand (psammophory), possibly offering protection against being eaten, or against high wind abrasion or insolation.
