= Helophorus nitiduloides =

Scientific classification
- Domain: Eukaryota
- Kingdom: Animalia
- Phylum: Arthropoda
- Class: Insecta
- Order: Coleoptera
- Suborder: Polyphaga
- Infraorder: Staphyliniformia
- Family: Helophoridae
- Genus: Helophorus
- Species: H. nitiduloides

Binomial name
- Helophorus nitiduloides Orchymont, 1945

Species of beetle

Helophorus nitiduloides is a species of water scavenger beetle in the family Helophoridae, which itself is within the superfamily Hydrophiloidea. H. nitiduloides is in the Helophorus genus, the only such genus in the family. It is found in North America. its
