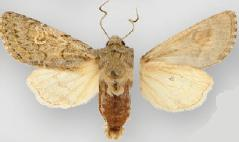

Scientific classification
- Kingdom: Animalia
- Phylum: Arthropoda
- Clade: Pancrustacea
- Class: Insecta
- Order: Lepidoptera
- Superfamily: Noctuoidea
- Family: Noctuidae
- Genus: Psammopolia
- Species: P. sala

Binomial name
- Psammopolia sala (Troubridge & Mustelin, 2006)

Synonyms
- Lasionycta sala Troubridge & Mustelin, 2006

= Psammopolia sala =

Species of moth

Psammopolia sala is a moth of the family Noctuidae. It is restricted to the type locality, the San Simeon Dunes, Oceana, San Luis Obispo County, California.

It flies over outer coastal dunes. It has been found.

Adults are on wing in May and again in September and October.
