= Helophorus auricollis =

Scientific classification
- Kingdom: Animalia
- Phylum: Arthropoda
- Class: Insecta
- Order: Coleoptera
- Suborder: Polyphaga
- Infraorder: Staphyliniformia
- Family: Helophoridae
- Genus: Helophorus
- Species: H. auricollis

Binomial name
- Helophorus auricollis Eschscholtz, 1822

Synonyms
- Helophorus angustulus Mannerheim, 1853; Helophorus inquinatus Mannerheim, 1852

Species of beetle

Helophorus auricollis is a species of water scavenger beetle in the family Hydrophilidae. It is found in Europe, Northern Asia (excluding China), and North America.
