= Helophorus linearoides =

Scientific classification
- Domain: Eukaryota
- Kingdom: Animalia
- Phylum: Arthropoda
- Class: Insecta
- Order: Coleoptera
- Suborder: Polyphaga
- Infraorder: Staphyliniformia
- Family: Helophoridae
- Genus: Helophorus
- Species: H. linearoides

Binomial name
- Helophorus linearoides Orchymont, 1945

Species of beetle

Helophorus linearoides is a species of water scavenger beetle in the family Hydrophilidae. It is found in North America.
