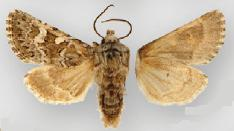
- Male
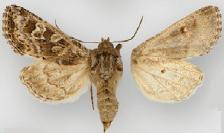
- Female

Scientific classification
- Domain: Eukaryota
- Kingdom: Animalia
- Phylum: Arthropoda
- Class: Insecta
- Order: Lepidoptera
- Superfamily: Noctuoidea
- Family: Noctuidae
- Genus: Psammopolia
- Species: P. ochracea

Binomial name
- Psammopolia ochracea (Smith, 1892)

Synonyms
- Xylomiges ochracea Smith, 1892; Lasionycta ochracea McDunnough, 1938

= Psammopolia ochracea =

Species of moth

Psammopolia ochracea is a species of moth in the family Noctuidae. It can be found on sandy beaches in coastal California between San Francisco and Los Angeles. Adult moths are small, dark brown or reddish in colour, and active between September and October.
