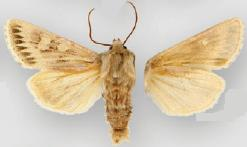
- Male
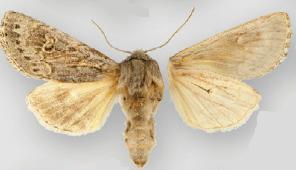
- Female

Scientific classification
- Kingdom: Animalia
- Phylum: Arthropoda
- Class: Insecta
- Order: Lepidoptera
- Superfamily: Noctuoidea
- Family: Noctuidae
- Genus: Psammopolia
- Species: P. insolens

Binomial name
- Psammopolia insolens (Grote, 1874)

Synonyms
- Dianthoecia insolens Grote, 1874a; Mamestra insolens Smith, 1893a; Lasionycta insolens McDunnough, 1938; Taeniocampa earina Morrison, 1874; Mamestra earina Smith, 1893a; Lasionycta earina McDunnough, 1938

= Psammopolia insolens =

Species of moth

Psammopolia insolens is a moth of the family Noctuidae. It occurs on Pacific Coast sand beaches in central California from Carmel to Bodega Bay, Sonoma County. Most specimens are from near San Francisco.

Adults are on wing in May and from mid-September through October.
