= Helophorus sempervarians =

Scientific classification
- Domain: Eukaryota
- Kingdom: Animalia
- Phylum: Arthropoda
- Class: Insecta
- Order: Coleoptera
- Suborder: Polyphaga
- Infraorder: Staphyliniformia
- Family: Helophoridae
- Genus: Helophorus
- Species: H. sempervarians

Binomial name
- Helophorus sempervarians Angus, 1970

Species of beetle

Helophorus sempervarians is a species of water scavenger beetle in the family Hydrophilidae. It is found in North America.
