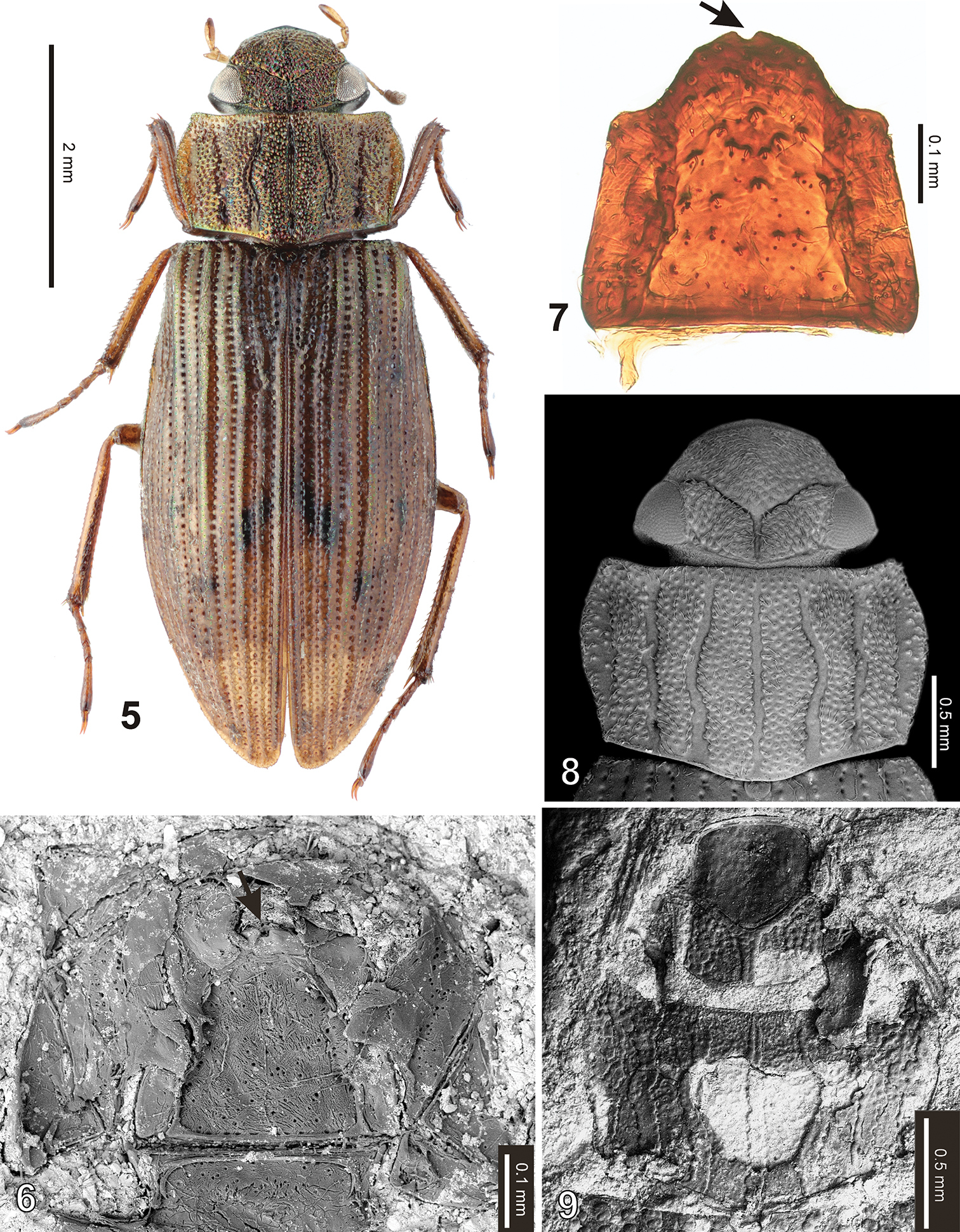

Scientific classification
- Domain: Eukaryota
- Kingdom: Animalia
- Phylum: Arthropoda
- Class: Insecta
- Order: Coleoptera
- Suborder: Polyphaga
- Infraorder: Staphyliniformia
- Family: Helophoridae
- Genus: Helophorus
- Species: H. sibiricus

Binomial name
- Helophorus sibiricus (Motschulsky, 1860)
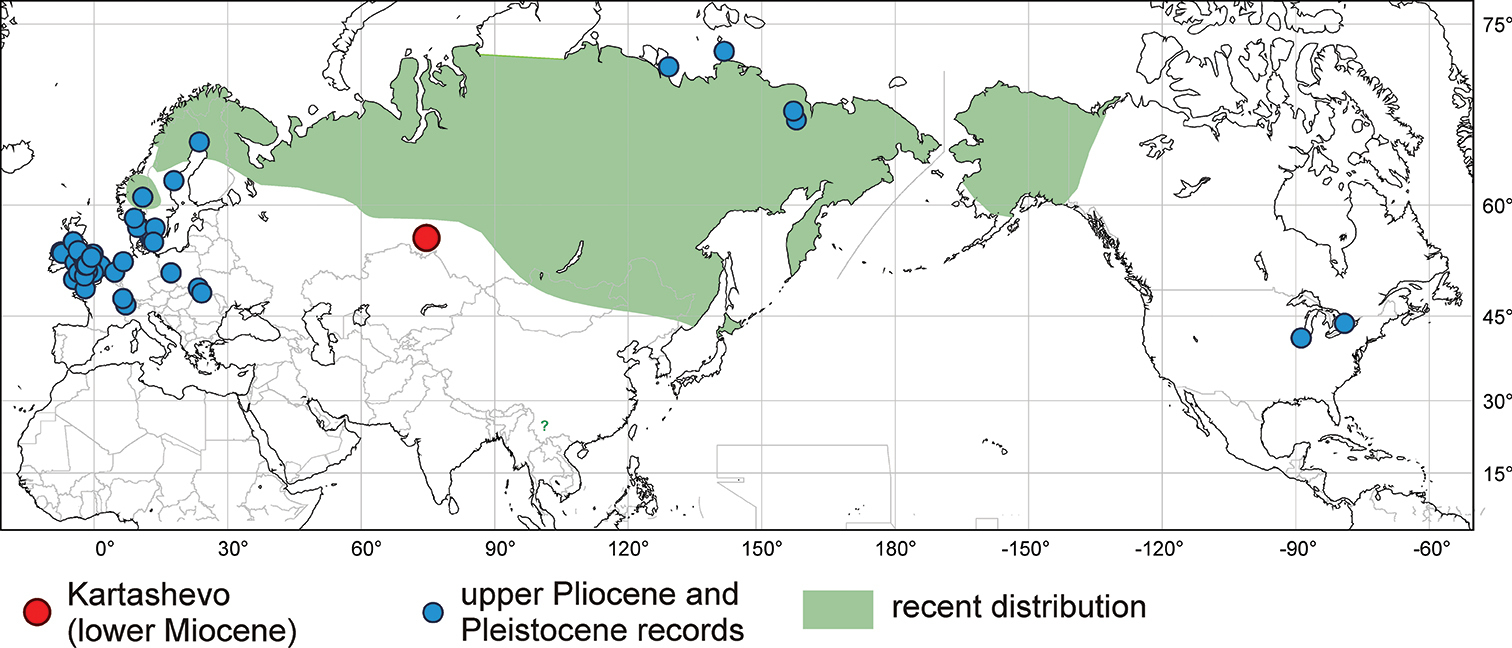

= Helophorus sibiricus =

Helophorus sibiricus Temporal range: Early Miocene–Recent

Species of beetle

Helophorus sibiricus is a species of water scavenger beetle in the family Hydrophilidae. It is found in Northern Europe, Northern Asia, and Alaska. Fossils from Early Miocene sediments of the Irtysh River in western Siberia have been reliably assigned to this species, which means that Helophorus sibiricus existed already 16-23 million years ago.
