= Psammophora saxicola =

Conservation status
- Least Concern (IUCN 3.1)

Scientific classification
- Kingdom: Plantae
- Clade: Tracheophytes
- Clade: Angiosperms
- Clade: Eudicots
- Order: Caryophyllales
- Family: Aizoaceae
- Genus: Psammophora
- Species: P. saxicola

Binomial name
- Psammophora saxicola H.E.K.Hartmann

Species of succulent

Psammophora saxicola is a species of plant in the family Aizoaceae. It is endemic to Namibia. It is threatened by habitat loss.
