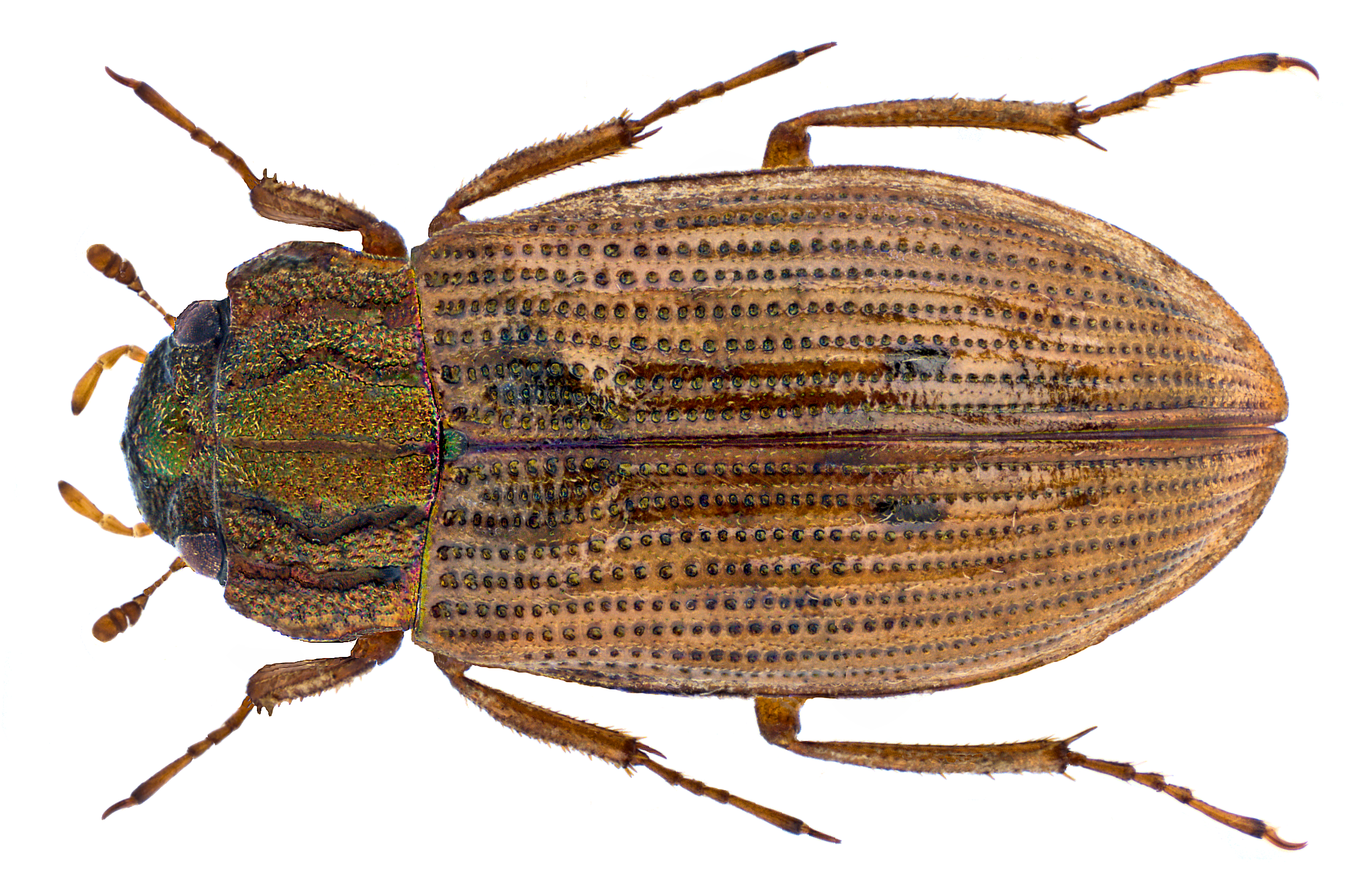

Scientific classification
- Kingdom: Animalia
- Phylum: Arthropoda
- Clade: Pancrustacea
- Class: Insecta
- Order: Coleoptera
- Suborder: Polyphaga
- Infraorder: Staphyliniformia
- Family: Helophoridae
- Genus: Helophorus
- Species: H. grandis

Binomial name
- Helophorus grandis Illiger, 1798

= Helophorus grandis =

Species of beetle

Helophorus grandis is a species of water scavenger beetle in the family Hydrophilidae. It is found in Africa, Europe, Northern Asia (excluding China), and North America.

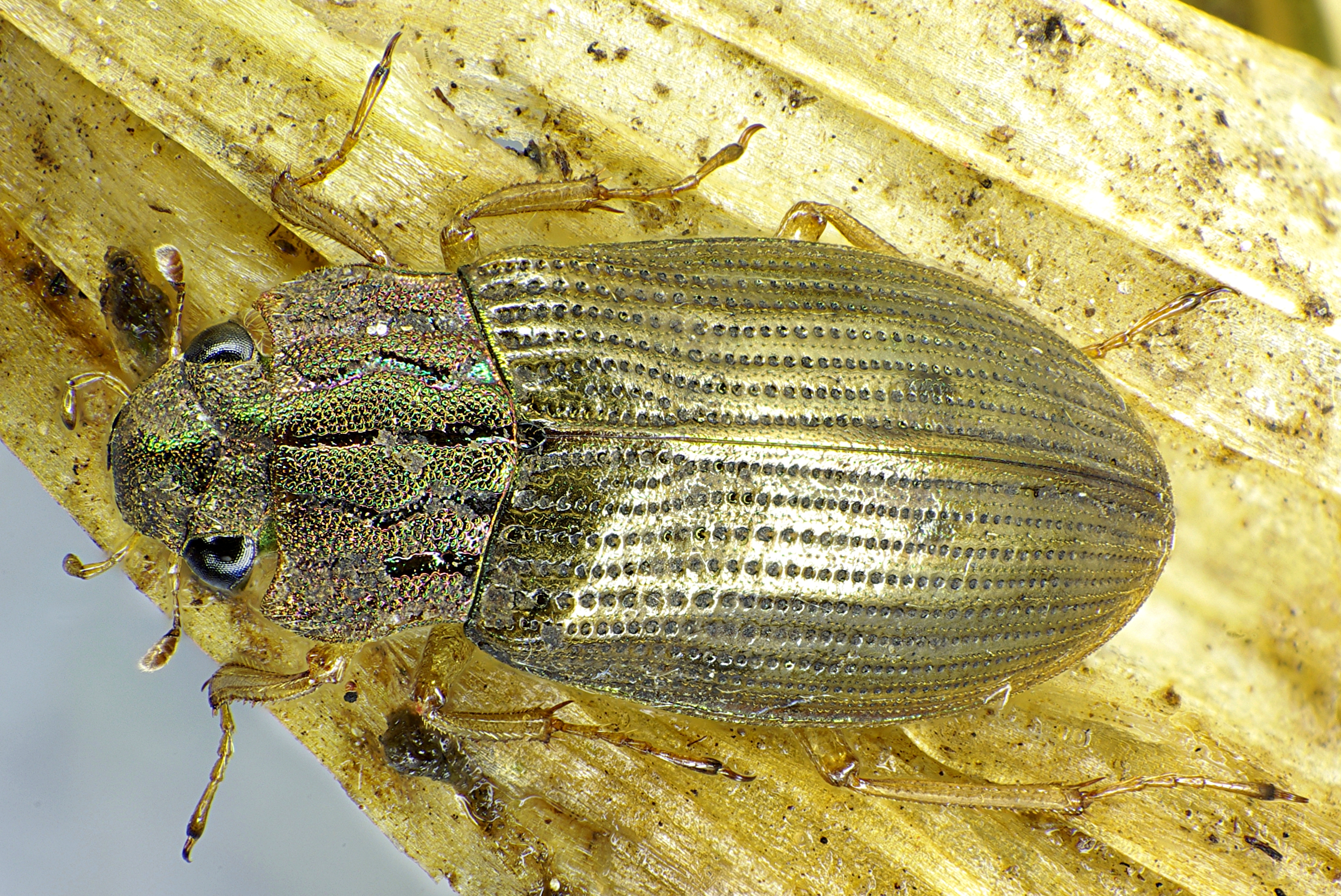

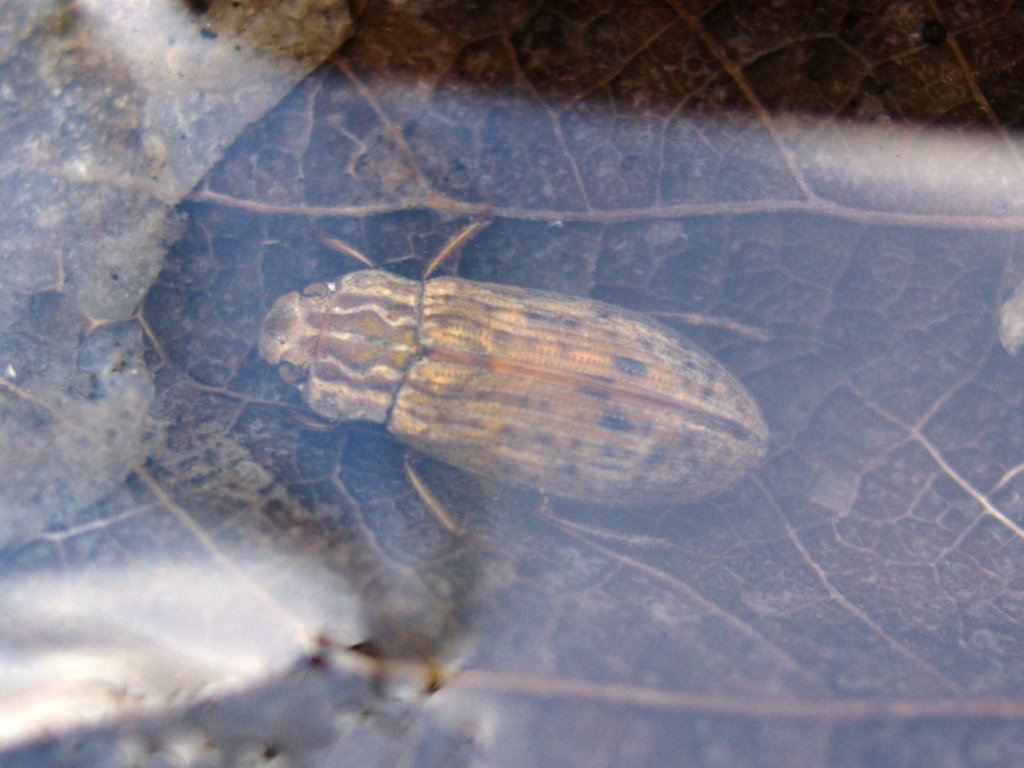
