= Hydrochus scabratus =

Scientific classification
- Domain: Eukaryota
- Kingdom: Animalia
- Phylum: Arthropoda
- Class: Insecta
- Order: Coleoptera
- Suborder: Polyphaga
- Infraorder: Staphyliniformia
- Family: Hydrochidae
- Genus: Hydrochus
- Species: H. scabratus

Binomial name
- Hydrochus scabratus Mulsant, 1844

Species of beetle

Hydrochus scabratus is a species of water scavenger beetle in the family Hydrochidae, sometimes treated as a member of the family Hydrophilidae. It is found in North America.
