= Hydrochus currani =

Scientific classification
- Kingdom: Animalia
- Phylum: Arthropoda
- Class: Insecta
- Order: Coleoptera
- Suborder: Polyphaga
- Infraorder: Staphyliniformia
- Family: Hydrochidae
- Genus: Hydrochus
- Species: H. currani

Binomial name
- Hydrochus currani Brown, 1929

Species of beetle

Hydrochus currani is a species of water scavenger beetle in the family Hydrochidae, sometimes treated as a member of the family Hydrophilidae. It is found in North America.
