= Helophorus orientalis =

Scientific classification
- Domain: Eukaryota
- Kingdom: Animalia
- Phylum: Arthropoda
- Class: Insecta
- Order: Coleoptera
- Suborder: Polyphaga
- Infraorder: Staphyliniformia
- Family: Helophoridae
- Genus: Helophorus
- Species: H. orientalis

Binomial name
- Helophorus orientalis Motschulsky, 1860

Species of beetle

Helophorus orientalis is a species of water scavenger beetle in the family Hydrophilidae. It is found in Europe and Northern Asia (excluding China), North America, and Southern Asia.
