= Helophorus tuberculatus =

Scientific classification
- Kingdom: Animalia
- Phylum: Arthropoda
- Class: Insecta
- Order: Coleoptera
- Suborder: Polyphaga
- Infraorder: Staphyliniformia
- Family: Helophoridae
- Genus: Helophorus
- Species: H. tuberculatus

Binomial name
- Helophorus tuberculatus Gyllenhal, 1808

Species of beetle

Helophorus tuberculatus is a species of water scavenger beetle in the family Hydrophilidae. It is found in Europe and Northern Asia (excluding China) and North America.
