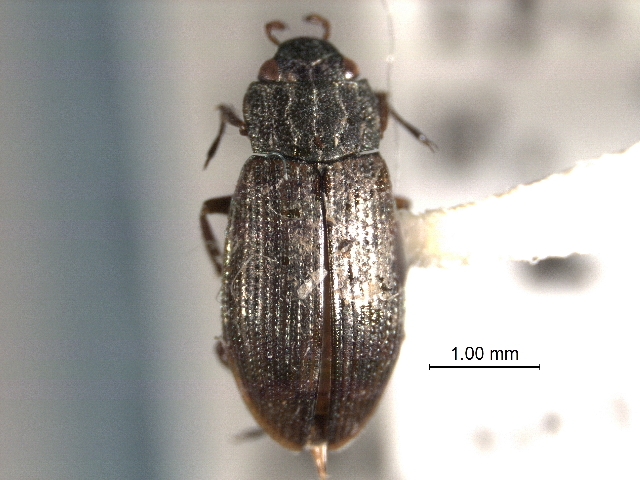

Scientific classification
- Domain: Eukaryota
- Kingdom: Animalia
- Phylum: Arthropoda
- Class: Insecta
- Order: Coleoptera
- Suborder: Polyphaga
- Infraorder: Staphyliniformia
- Family: Helophoridae
- Genus: Helophorus
- Species: H. eclectus

Binomial name
- Helophorus eclectus Orchymont, 1945

= Helophorus eclectus =

Species of beetle

Helophorus eclectus, the sculpted pool scavenger, is a species of beetle in the family Helophoridae. It is found in North America where it lives in shallow pools of water, usually saline, often ditches or sloughs.
