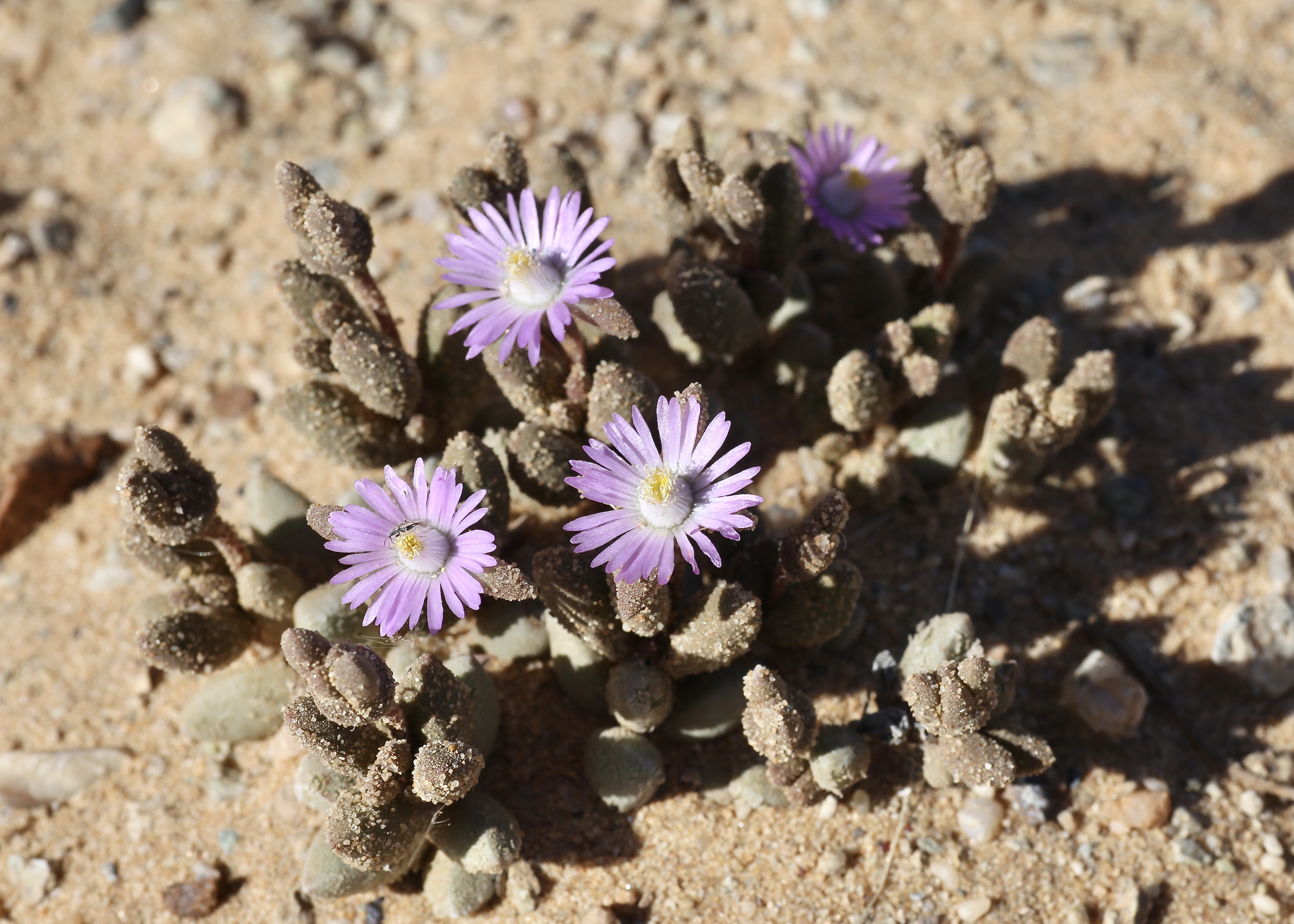

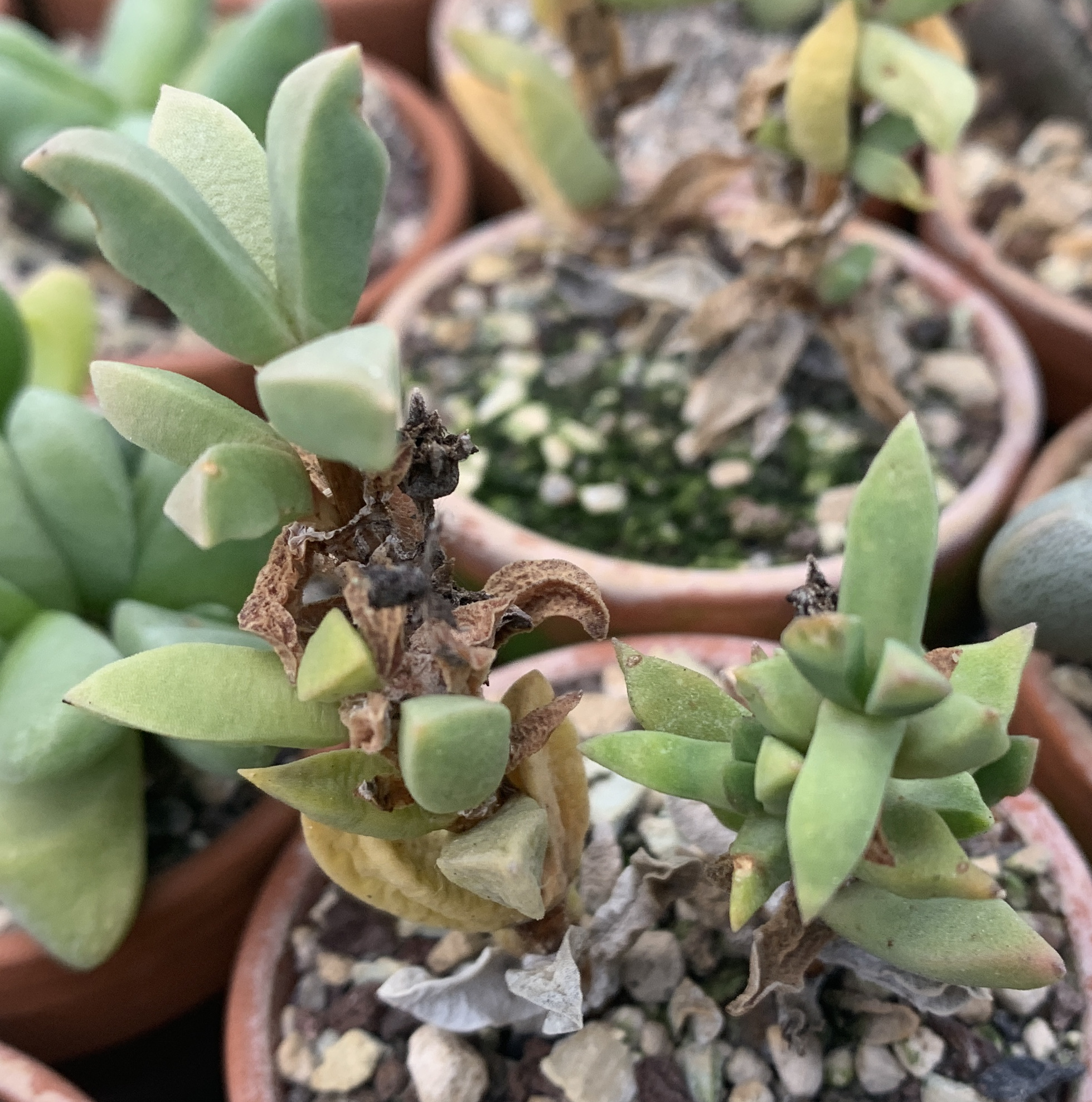

Scientific classification
- Kingdom: Plantae
- Clade: Tracheophytes
- Clade: Angiosperms
- Clade: Eudicots
- Order: Caryophyllales
- Family: Aizoaceae
- Genus: Psammophora
- Species: P. modesta

Binomial name
- Psammophora modesta (Dinter & A.Berger) Dinter & Schwantes

Synonyms
- Mesembryanthemum modestum Dinter & A.Berger

= Psammophora modesta =

Species of succulent

Psammophora modesta, commonly known as the gomvy in Afrikaans, is a succulent plant in the Aizoaceae family. The species is native to Namibia and South Africa. In South Africa it occurs in the Northern Cape in the Richtersveld and in Namibia in the Sperrgebiet. The plant has a range of 5 063 km^{2}. There are nine known subpopulations and the plant is threatened by mining activities and climate change. In South Africa it is also threatened by overgrazing by livestock.
