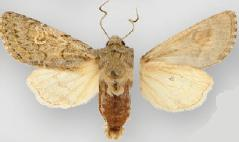
- Psammopolia sala

Scientific classification
- Kingdom: Animalia
- Phylum: Arthropoda
- Clade: Pancrustacea
- Class: Insecta
- Order: Lepidoptera
- Superfamily: Noctuoidea
- Family: Noctuidae
- Tribe: Eriopygini
- Genus: Psammopolia; Crabo & Lafontaine, 2009

= Psammopolia =

Genus of moths

Psammopolia is a genus of moths of the family Noctuidae.

== Species ==
- Psammopolia arietis (Grote, 1879)
- Psammopolia insolens (Grote, 1874)
- Psammopolia ochracea (Smith, 1892)
- Psammopolia sala (Troubridge & Mustelin, 2006)
- Psammopolia wyatti (Barnes & Benjamin, 1926)
