= Psammophora longifolia =

Scientific classification
- Kingdom: Plantae
- Clade: Tracheophytes
- Clade: Angiosperms
- Clade: Eudicots
- Order: Caryophyllales
- Family: Aizoaceae
- Genus: Psammophora
- Species: P. longifolia

Binomial name
- Psammophora longifolia L.Bolus

Synonyms
- Psammophora herrei L.Bolus

Species of succulent

Psammophora longifolia is a succulent plant in the Aizoaceae family. The species is native to Namibia and South Africa. The only known subpopulation in South Africa, at Swartwater in the Richtersveld, has been destroyed by mining activity and the habitat has been devastated by overgrazing. There may be other undiscovered subpopulations remaining. In Namibia, the species occurs in the south.
