= Psammophory =

Method by which certain plants armor themselves

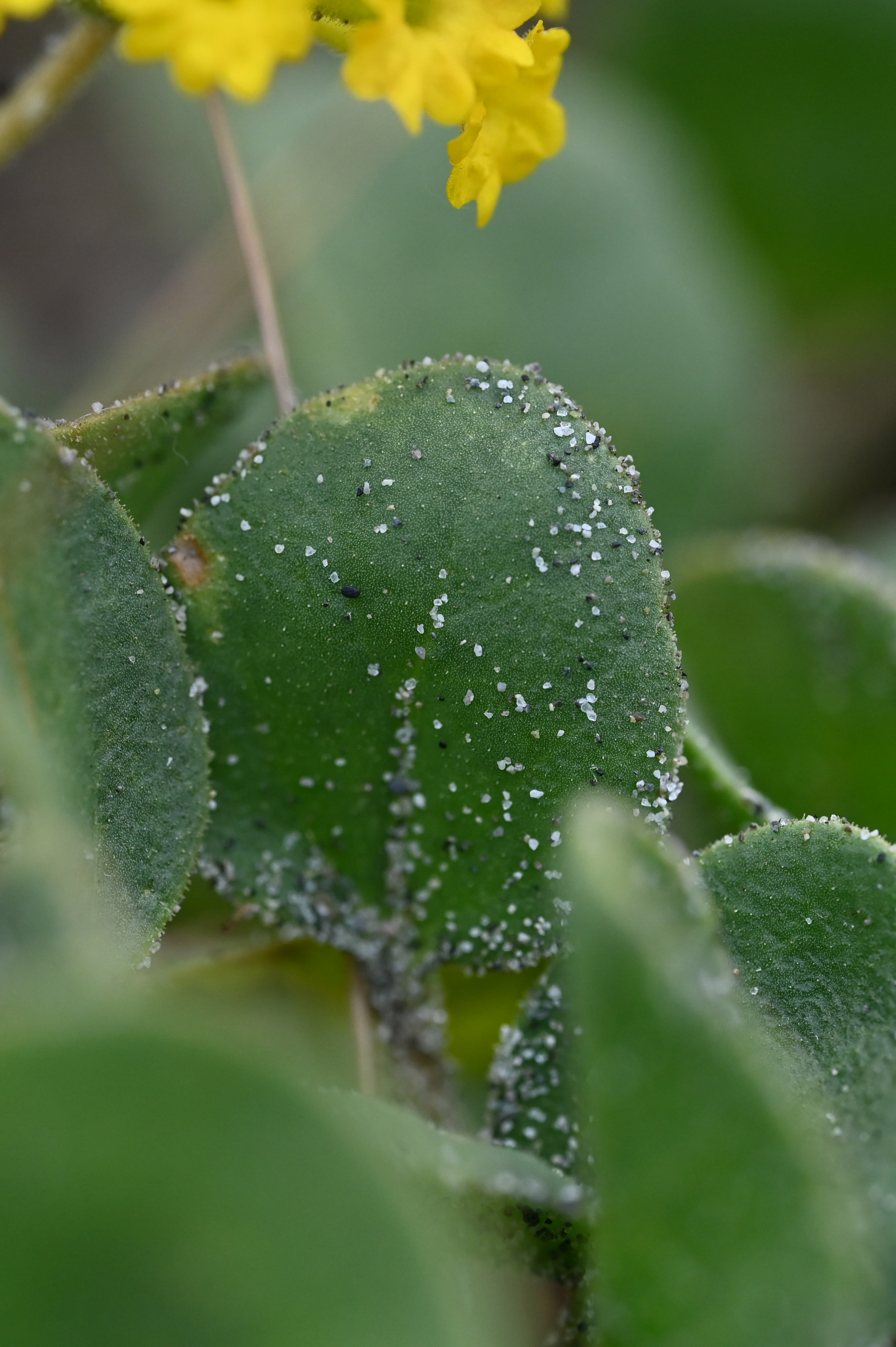
Close up of Abronia latifolia leaf demonstrating psammophory

Psammophory is a method by which certain plants armor themselves with sand on their body parts, lowering the chance of them being eaten by animals. Psammophory occurs in plants of the genus Psammophora, which have a viscous mucus on the surface of their leaves, to which sand particles stick. Over 200 species of plants hailing from 88 genera in 34 families have been identified as psammophorous. This adaptive mechanism is used not only by plants but also by some insects.

In plants, psammophory allows the formation of a protective layer of sand on their stems and leaves. This layer may reduce the likelihood of damage to the plant by herbivores and insects. In insects, this mechanism also has a defensive function. For example, some insects, such as certain species of beetles, can actively coat their bodies with sand or dust, which allows them to become less visible to predators and provides an additional layer of protection. This phenomenon is also characteristic of Crassula alpestris.

The term was first proposed in 1989 by scientists studying the habits of the beetle Georissus which actively covers its elytra with sand or mud particles. It was further documented in various studies from the University of California, Davis.

== Entomology ==
This phenomenon is often associated with the beetle family Georissidae as a whole. However, so far only the following species have been documented to have this ability: Georissidae crenulatus, Georissidae canalifer, Georissidae californicus and Georissidae pusillus.

A similar term, “psammophore,” refers to the formation of bristles and hairs on the underside of the head of some ants and wasps, which serves to carry small particles of soil, sand, small seeds, and eggs.
