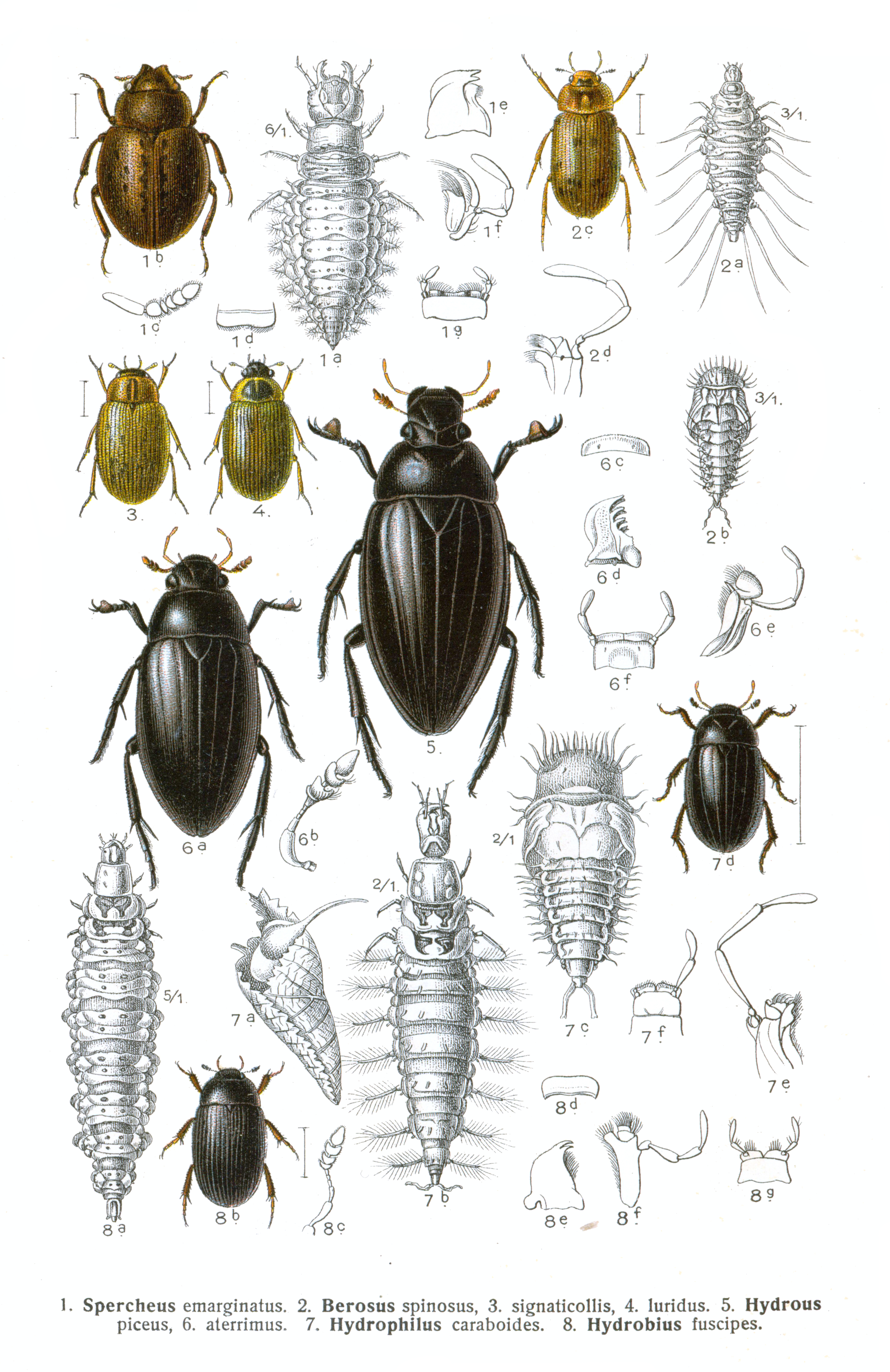
- Various Central European Hydrophiloidea, their larvae, and anatomical details

Scientific classification
- Kingdom: Animalia
- Phylum: Arthropoda
- Class: Insecta
- Order: Coleoptera
- Suborder: Polyphaga
- Infraorder: Staphyliniformia
- Superfamily: Hydrophiloidea; Latreille, 1802

Families
- Several, see text

= Hydrophiloidea =

Hydrophiloidea Temporal range: Late Jurassic–Recent

Superfamily of beetles

Hydrophiloidea, known as water scavenger beetles, is a superfamily of beetles. Until recently it included only a single family, the Hydrophilidae (water scavenger beetles), but several of the subfamilies have been removed and raised to family rank. Hydrophiliidae remains by far the largest member of the group, with nearly 3,000 described species. The other families have no more than 400 species. The Histeroidea are closely related and sometimes considered part of a sensu lato Hydrophiloidea. The majority of the clade is aquatic, which is thought to be the ancestral ecology of the group, with some lineages like Sphaeridiinae becoming secondarily terrestrial. Modern representatives of the group first appeared during the Late Jurassic.

Families include:

- Epimetopidae
- Georissidae
- Helophoridae
- Hydrochidae
- Hydrophilidae
- Spercheidae

== Extinct genera ==
- †Laetopsia Fikácek et al. 2012 Yixian Formation, China, Shinekhudag Formation, Dzun-Bain Formation Mongolia, Zaza Formation, Russia, Early Cretaceous (Aptian)
- †Cretotaenia Ponomarenko 1977 Zaza Formation, Russia, Early Cretaceous (Aptian)
- †Hydrophilopsia Ponomarenko 1987 Glushkovo Formation, Russia, Late Jurassic (Tithonian), Turga Formation, Russia, Early Cretaceous (Aptian)
