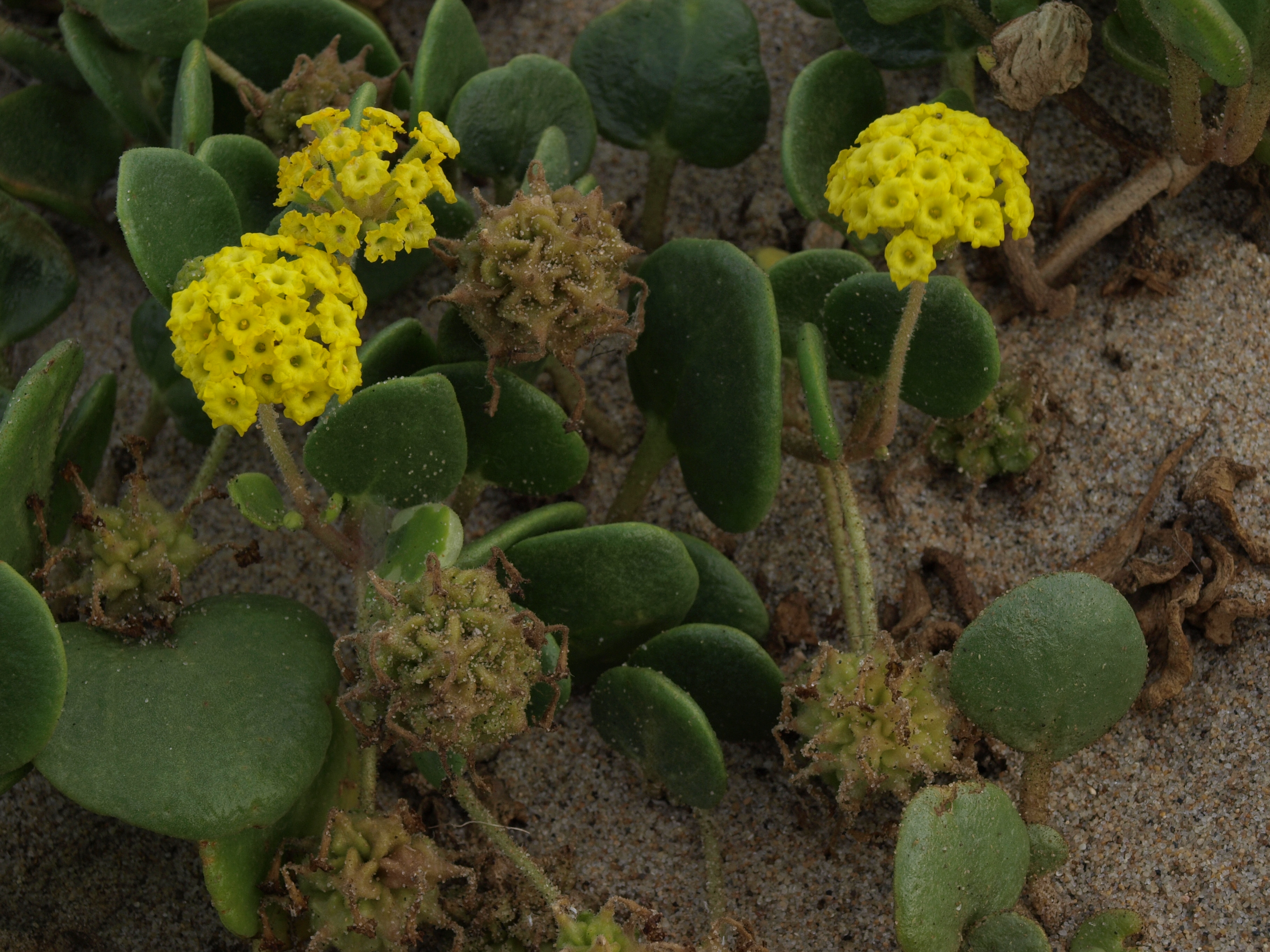

Conservation status
- Secure (NatureServe)

Scientific classification
- Kingdom: Plantae
- Clade: Embryophytes
- Clade: Tracheophytes
- Clade: Spermatophytes
- Clade: Angiosperms
- Clade: Eudicots
- Order: Caryophyllales
- Family: Nyctaginaceae
- Genus: Abronia
- Species: A. latifolia

Binomial name
- Abronia latifolia Eschsch.

Synonyms
- Abronia arenaria Menzies ex Hook.; Tricratus arenarius (Menzies ex Hook.) Spreng.

= Abronia latifolia =

Yellow sand-verbena

Species of flowering plant

The perennial flower Abronia latifolia or Abronia arenaria is a species of sand-verbena known commonly as the coastal sand-verbena, or yellow sand-verbena. It is native to the west coast of North America, from southern California to southern British Columbia. In Canada, it is at risk of becoming extirpated, threatened, or endangered.

The plant bears attractive neatly rounded heads of small, bright golden flowers. The individual flowers have no petals; rather, they are composed of yellow bracts forming a trumpet-shaped calyx about the stamens. It bears a small, winged fruit. The plant grows in succulent mats on sand or other coastal substrate. The roots are stout, fusiform and often several feet long. These roots are edible, traditionally eaten by the Chinookan peoples. This plant is seen exhibiting psammophory, a method by which plants save themselves from herbivores by attracting sand to their body making them difficult to be eaten. It needs salt water, not fresh water, and will not tolerate extreme drought.

== Gallery ==
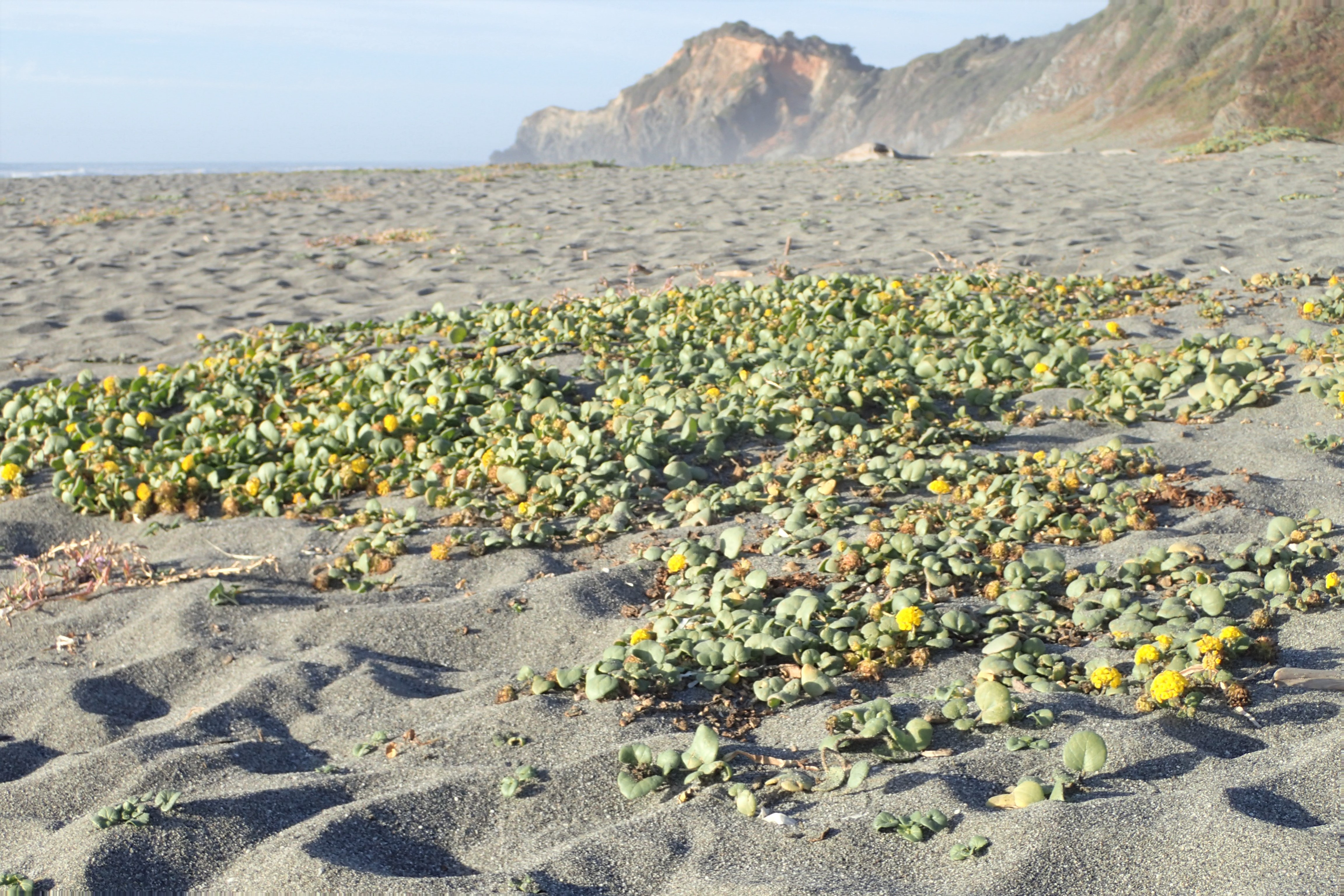
The plant in Humboldt County, CA

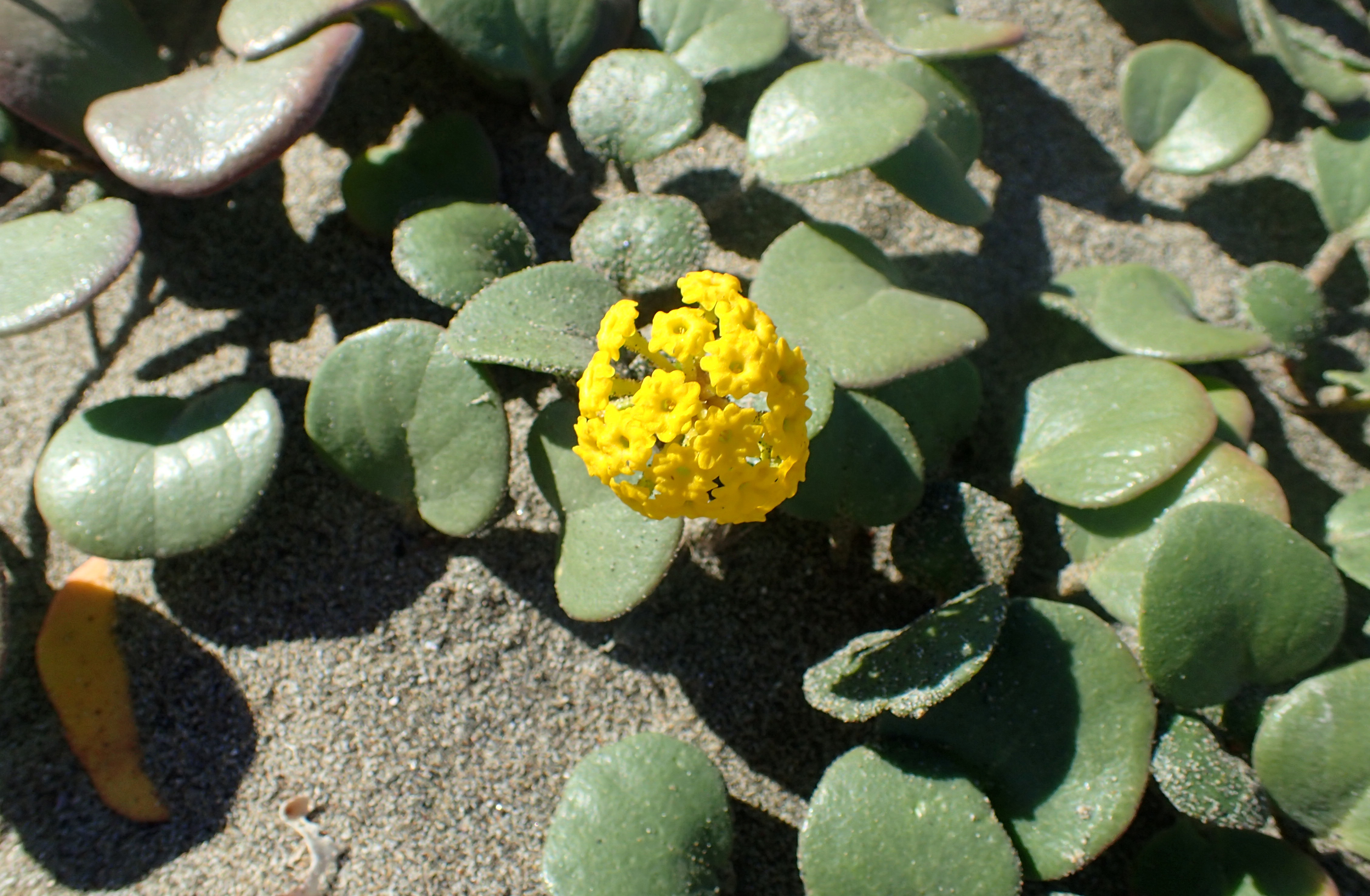
Detail of the leaves and flower

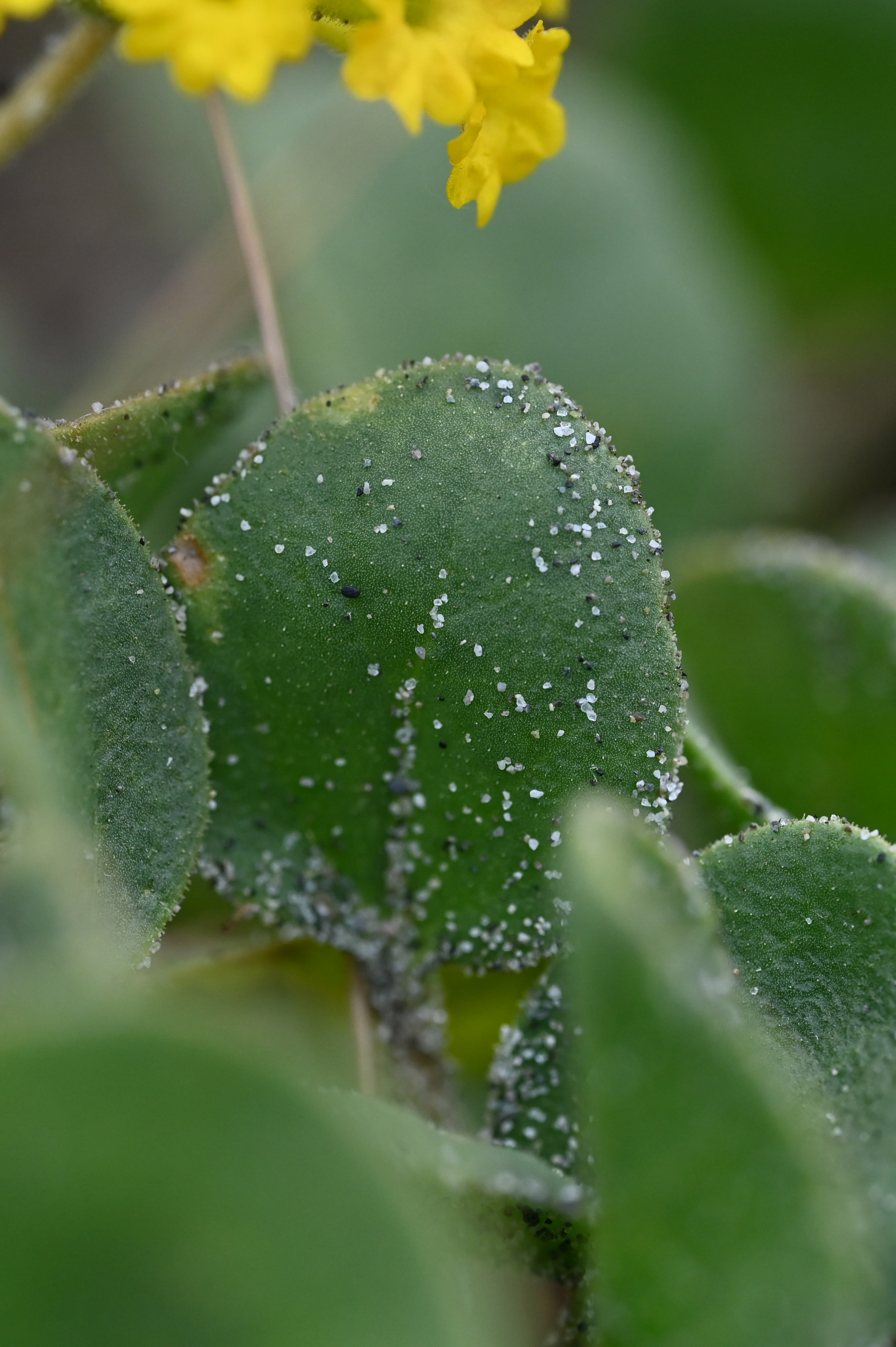
Close up of Abronia latifolia leaf demonstrating psammophory

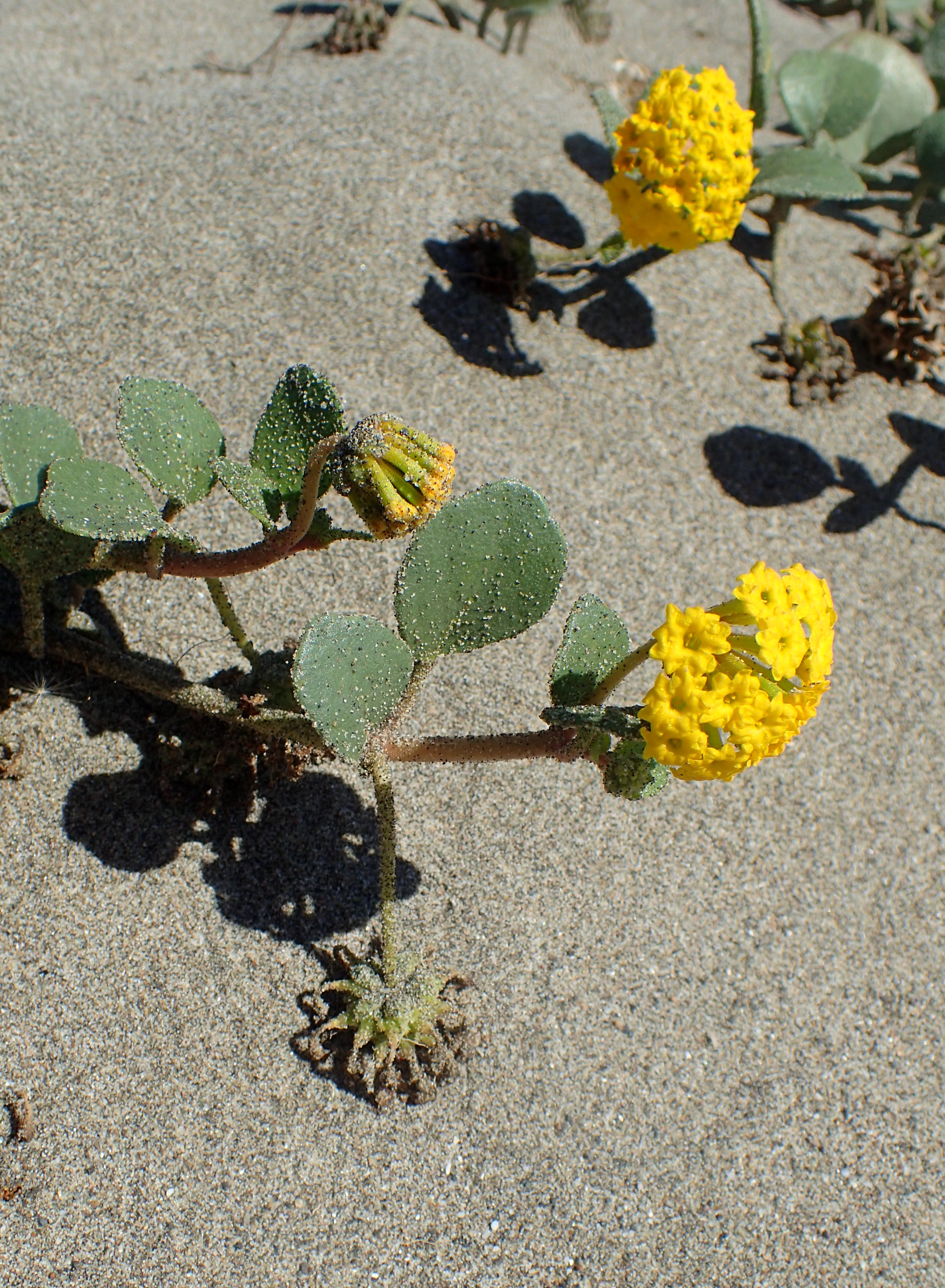
A. latifolia thrives in a harsh environment

== Sources ==
- Munz, Philip A. (2003). Introduction to Shore Wildflowers of California, Oregon, and Washington. Berkeley: University of California Press.
