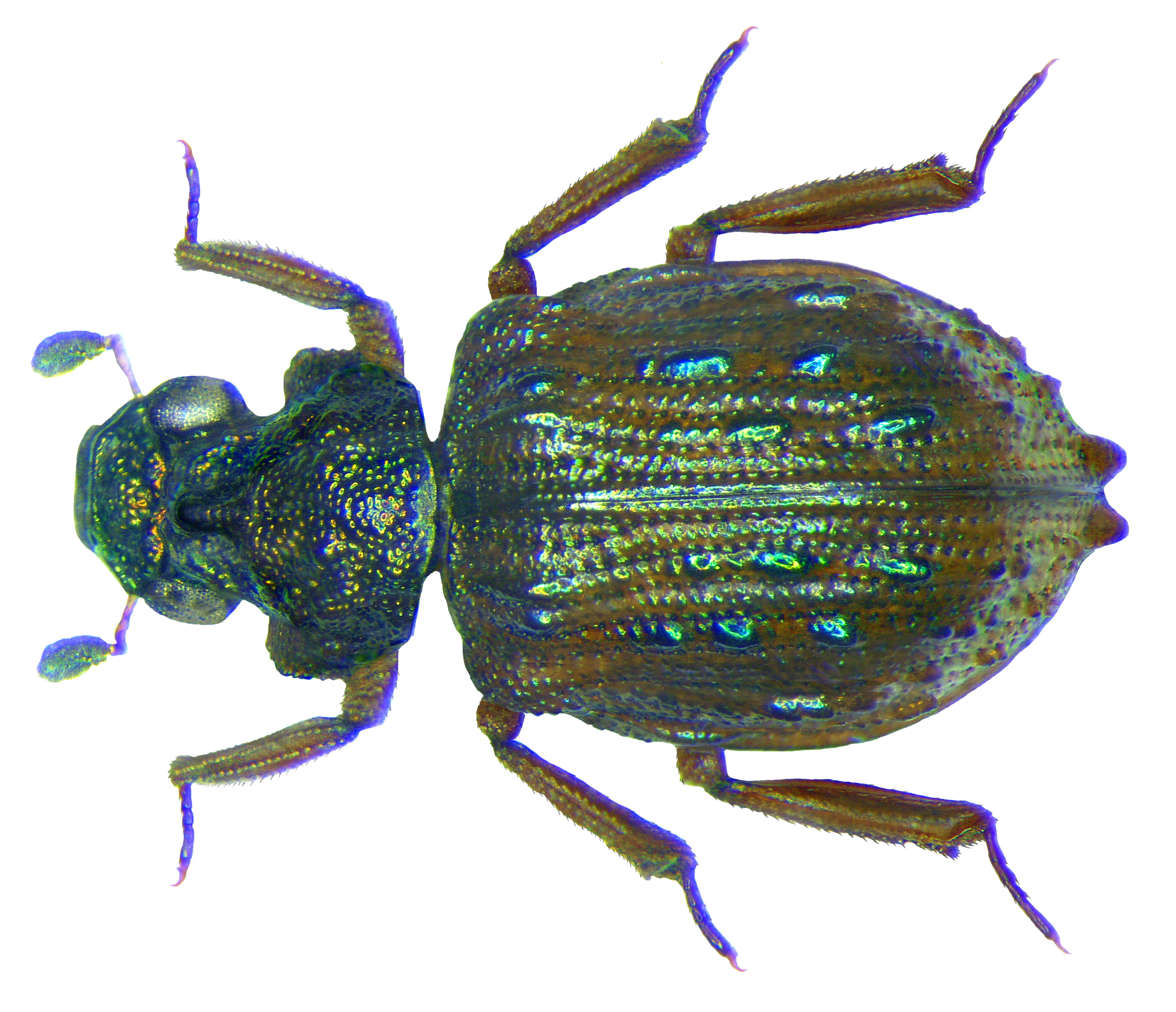
- Eumetopus flavidulus

Scientific classification
- Kingdom: Animalia
- Phylum: Arthropoda
- Clade: Pancrustacea
- Class: Insecta
- Order: Coleoptera
- Suborder: Polyphaga
- Infraorder: Staphyliniformia
- Superfamily: Hydrophiloidea
- Family: Epimetopidae; Zaitzev, 1908

Genera
- Epimetopus; Eumetopus; Eupotemus

= Epimetopidae =

Family of beetles

Epimetopidae is a family of semi-aquatic beetles belonging to the Hydrophiloidea. They are found in sand and gravel at the edges of streams, rivers and shallow freshwater ponds. These beetles are shorter than half a centimeter long and have a pronotum with a central projection forming a shelf above the head. On the underside of the abdomen only four sternites are visible. There are approximately 72 described species in three genera, Epimetopus which is restricted to the New World, mostly Neotropical, Eupotemus with two Afrotropical species and Eumetopus with some Oriental species. Females carry their eggcases on the underside of the abdomen. The larvae are probably carnivorous based on their mouthparts and likely live in the same habitats as the adults.
