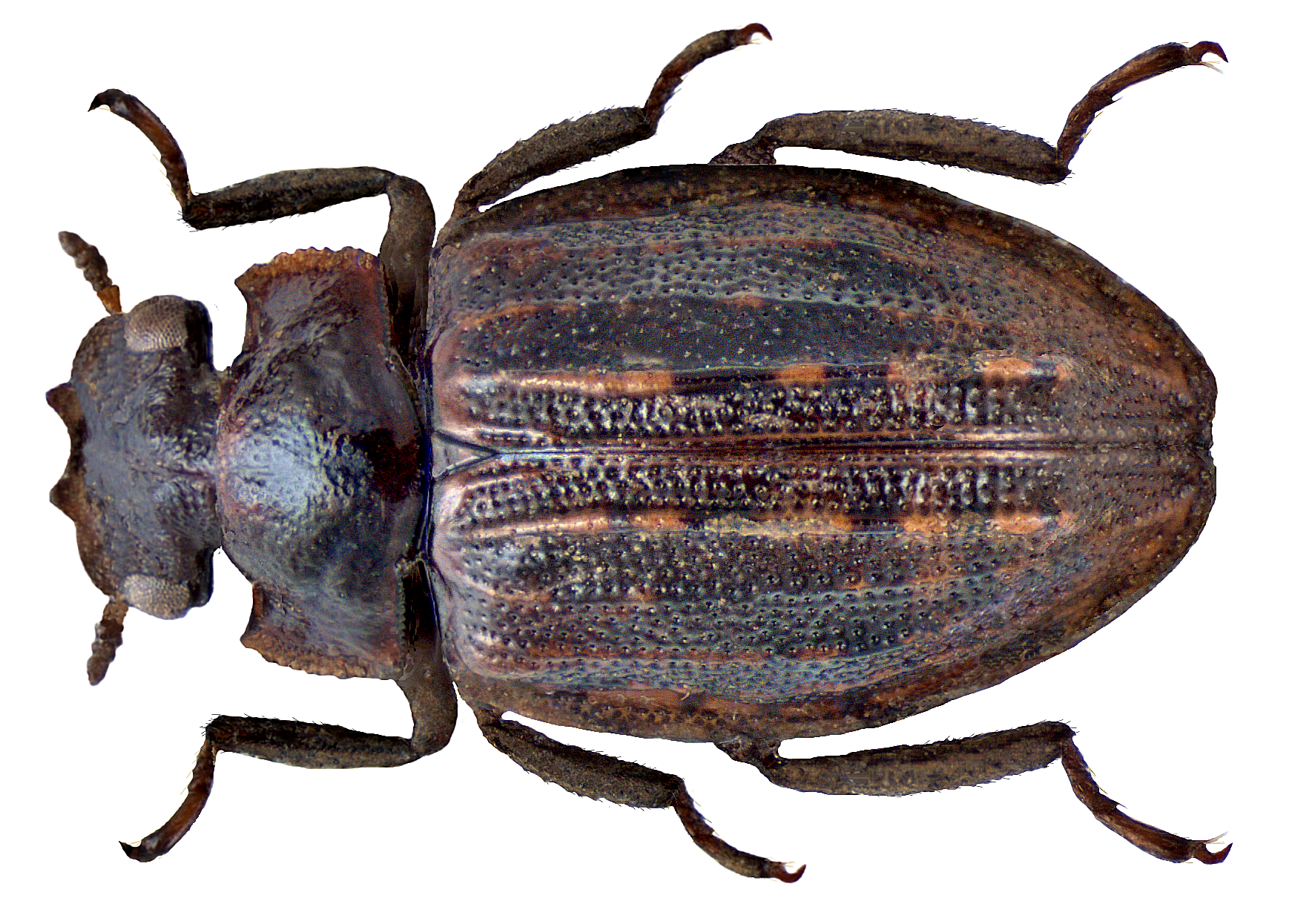
- Dorsal view of S. senegalensis
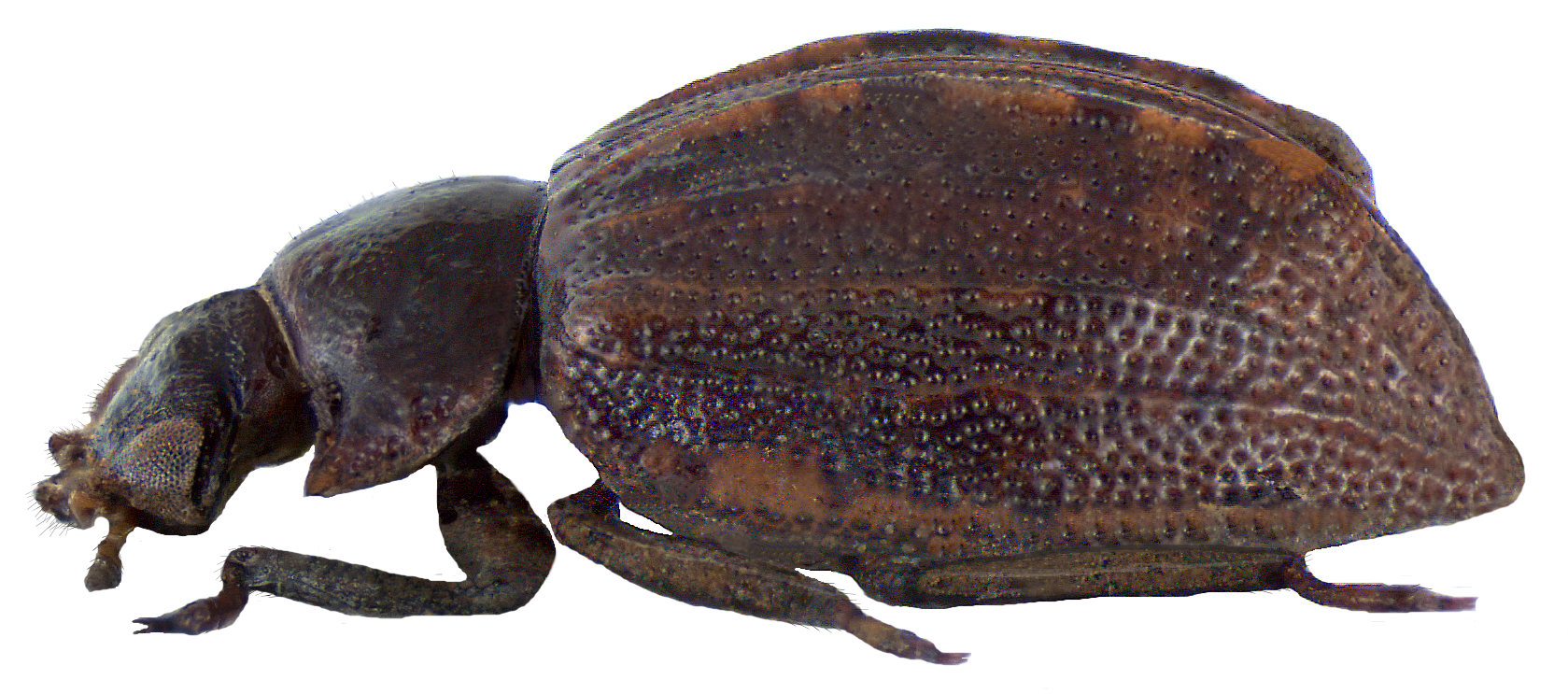
- Profile view of S. senegalensis

Scientific classification
- Kingdom: Animalia
- Phylum: Arthropoda
- Clade: Pancrustacea
- Class: Insecta
- Order: Coleoptera
- Suborder: Polyphaga
- Infraorder: Staphyliniformia
- Superfamily: Hydrophiloidea
- Family: Spercheidae; Erichson, 1837
- Genus: Spercheus; Kugelann, 1798

= Spercheus =

Genus of beetles

Spercheus is a genus of aquatic beetles which are placed in a family of their own, Spercheidae within the Hydrophiloidea. About 20 species are known from around the world except the Nearctic with the majority being from the Oriental and Afrotropical Realms.

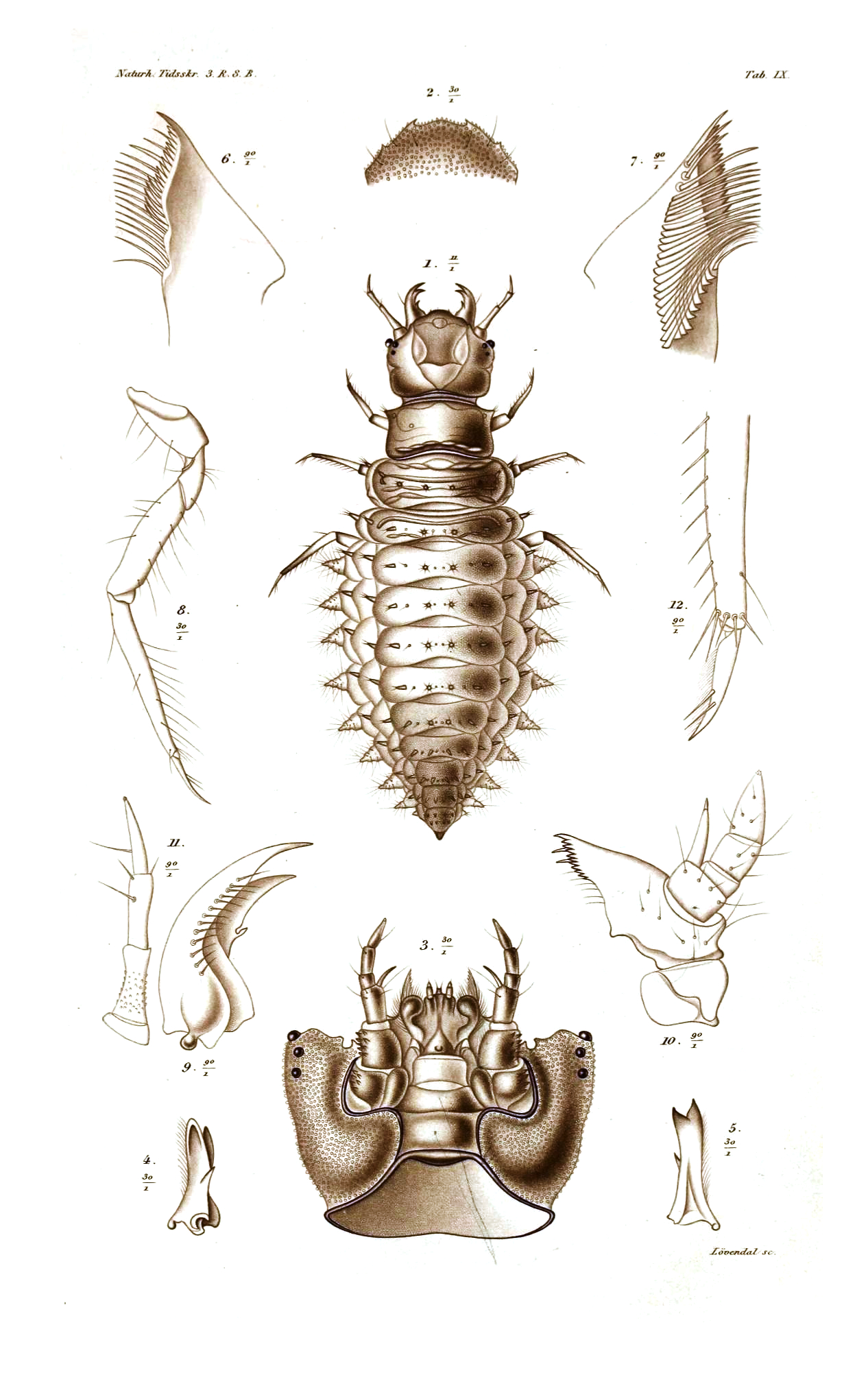
Larva of Spercheus emarginatus

All life stages are found in shallow still water with rich vegetation, which in some species includes temporary saline pools. Adults and larvae live attached to pieces of vegetation or debris, and also walk on the underside of the water surface. Air is held in a bubble on the underside of the body. The larvae feed on grazed detritus as well as drifting algae, dead organisms, and other organic refuse. The adults live as filter feeders on floating debris like decaying plant material and other decomposing organic remains. The adult females build a silken-egg case which they attach to their mid-tibiae and held by the hind legs, carried below the abdomen. These beetles were formerly placed in the family Hydrophilidae but are distinctive.

The front of the head is notched and the 7–9 segmented antenna has the terminal 3–4 segments club like and an enlarged fourth segment. The elytra are very convex and one or two abdominal segments may extend beyond the apex. They have 5 tarsal segments on all legs.

Possible fossils of Spercheus have been described from the Eocene aged Bembridge Marls of the Isle of Wight, England. The extinct genus Prospercheus from the Late Jurassic of Shar-Teg, Mongolia, has also been considered a close relative of Spercheus, and also placed in Spercheidae.

== Species ==
- Spercheus belli Champion, 1919
- Spercheus burgeoni Orchymont, 1929
- Spercheus cerisyi Guérin Méneville, 1842
- Spercheus crenulatus Fairmaire, 1893
- Spercheus emarginatus (Schaller, 1783)
- Spercheus fimbriicollis Bruch, 1915
- Spercheus gerardi Orchymont, 1929
- Spercheus halophilus Archangelsky, 2001
- Spercheus hanseni Hebauer, 1990
- Spercheus hovanus Fairmaire, 1903
- Spercheus humeralis Régimbart, 1906
- Spercheus platycephalus MacLeay, 1825
- Spercheus senegalensis Castelnau, 1832
- Spercheus siamensis Hebauer, 1990
- Spercheus spangleri Hebauer, 1990
- Spercheus stangli Schwarz & Barber, 1918
- Spercheus stasimus Orchymont, 1937
- Spercheus wattsi Hebauer, 1999
