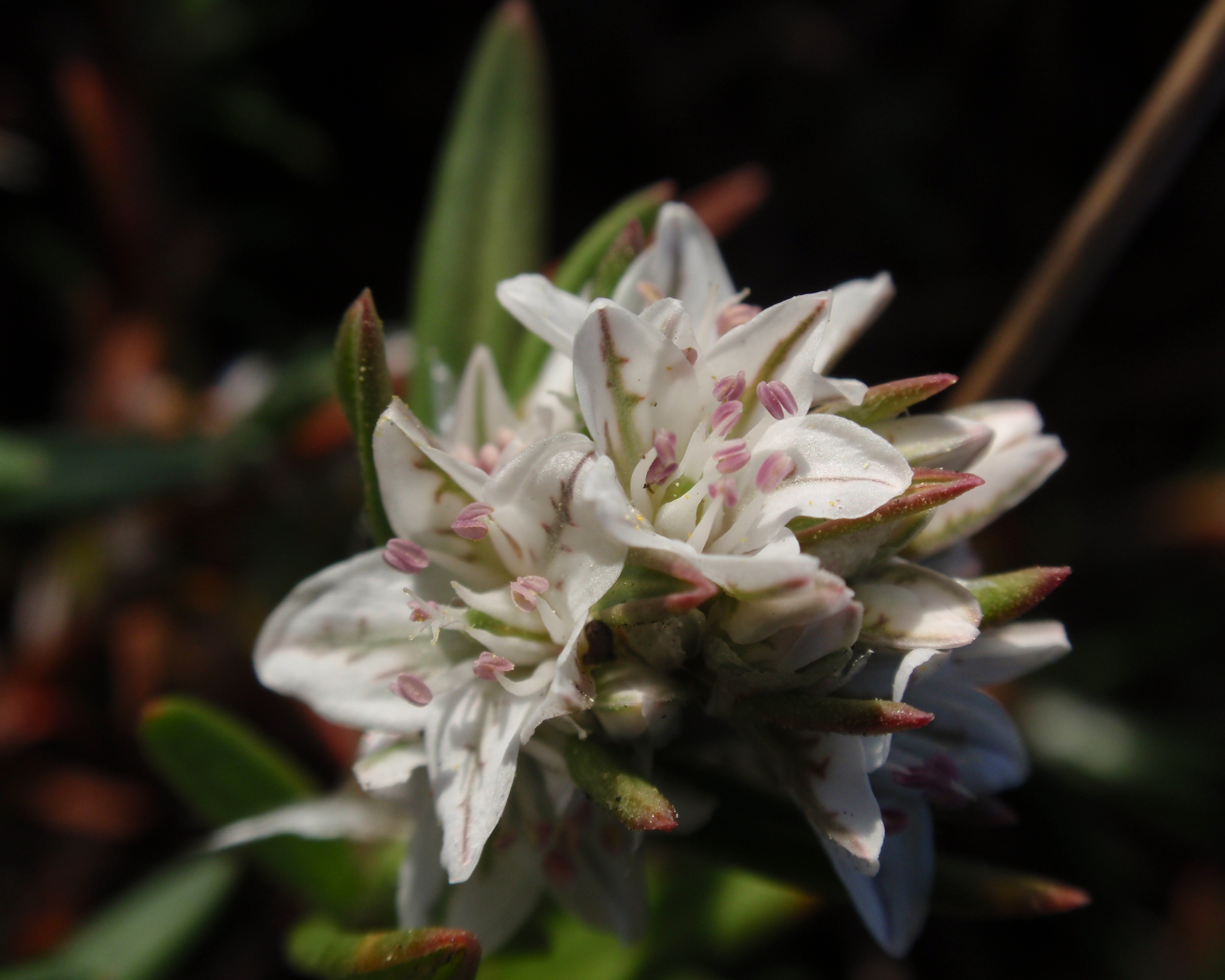

Scientific classification
- Kingdom: Plantae
- Clade: Tracheophytes
- Clade: Angiosperms
- Clade: Eudicots
- Order: Caryophyllales
- Family: Polygonaceae
- Genus: Polygonum
- Species: P. paronychia

Binomial name
- Polygonum paronychia Cham. & Schltdl. 1828

= Polygonum paronychia =

Species of flowering plant

Polygonum paronychia is a species of flowering plant in the knotweed family known by the common names dune knotweed, black knotweed, and beach knotweed. It is native to the coastline of western North America from British Columbia to California, where it grows in sandy coastal habitat such as beaches, dunes, and scrub.

== Description ==
Polygonum paronychia is a small prostrate or upright shrub producing multibranched brown stems up to a meter (40 inches) long. The stems may root at nodes that come in contact with moist substrate. The leaves are alternately arranged on the stems but are mostly located bunched around the tips of the stem branches. The leaves are linear to lance-shaped with rolled edges and bristly midribs on the undersides. Each leaf has a large stipule which forms a wide, membranous ochrea. The ochrea is up to 2 centimeters (0.8 inches) long and is persistent, fraying into fibrous, silvery shreds that remain on the plant through the seasons. Flowers occur in the leaf axils. Each is up to a centimeter (0.4 inches) wide with five narrow white or pinkish corolla lobes.

== Uses ==
The plant has been made into a poultice to treat whitlow infections.
