= List of Bembidion species =

This is a list of approximately 1400 species in Bembidion, a genus of ground beetles in the family Carabidae.

== Bembidion species ==
=== A ===
- Bembidion abbreviatum Solsky, 1874
- Bembidion abchasicum Müller-Motzfeld, 1989
- Bembidion abdelkrimi Netolitzky, 1926
- Bembidion abeillei Bedel, 1879
- Bembidion aberdarense Alluaud, 1939
- Bembidion abnormale Jedlicka, 1965
- Bembidion achipungi Moret & Toledano, 2002
- Bembidion acticola Casey, 1884
- Bembidion actuarium Broun, 1903
- Bembidion actuosum Casey, 1918
- Bembidion acutifrons LeConte, 1879
- Bembidion adductum Casey, 1918
- Bembidion adelaidae Lindroth, 1980
- Bembidion admirandum (Sharp, 1903)
- Bembidion adowanum Chaudoir, 1876
- Bembidion advena Sharp, 1903
- Bembidion adygorum Belousov & Sokolov, 1996
- Bembidion aegrum Erwin, 1982
- Bembidion aegyptiacum Dejean, 1831
- Bembidion aeneicolle (LeConte, 1847)
- Bembidion aeneipes Bates, 1883
- Bembidion aeneum Germar, 1823
- Bembidion aenulum Hayward, 1901
- Bembidion aeruginosum (Gebler, 1833)
- Bembidion aestuarii (Ueno & Habu, 1954)
- Bembidion aethiopicum Raffray, 1886
- Bembidion aetolicum Apfelbeck, 1901
- Bembidion affine Say, 1823
- Bembidion africanum Chaudoir, 1876
- Bembidion afroseptentrionale Neri & Gudenzi, 2013
- Bembidion agonoides Taglianti & Toledano, 2008
- Bembidion ahrensi Schmidt, 2018
- Bembidion ainu Habu & Baba, 1968
- Bembidion ajmonis Netolitzky, 1935
- Bembidion alacre (Broun, 1921)
- Bembidion alaf Britton, 1948
- Bembidion alaskense Lindroth, 1962
- Bembidion alatum Darlington, 1953
- Bembidion albertisi Putzeys, 1875
- Bembidion albescens (Bates, 1878)
- Bembidion albovirens (Sloane, 1903)
- Bembidion algidum Andrewes, 1935
- Bembidion aliense Habu, 1973
- Bembidion alikhelicum Kirschenhofer, 1989
- Bembidion allegroi Toledano, 2008
- Bembidion almum J.Sahlberg, 1900
- Bembidion alpineanum Casey, 1924
- Bembidion alsium Coquerel, 1866
- Bembidion altaicum (Gebler, 1833)
- Bembidion altestriatum Netolitzky, 1934
- Bembidion alticola A.Fiori, 1903
- Bembidion amamiense Morita, 2008
- Bembidion amaurum Bates, 1883
- Bembidion ambiguum Dejean, 1831
- Bembidion americanum Dejean, 1831
- Bembidion amnicola J.Sahlberg, 1900
- Bembidion amoenum R.F.Sahlberg, 1844
- Bembidion ampliatum Casey, 1918
- Bembidion ampliceps Casey, 1918
- Bembidion amurense (Motschulsky, 1860)
- Bembidion ancash Toledano, 2008
- Bembidion anchonoderus Bates, 1878
- Bembidion andersoni Toledano, 2008
- Bembidion andinum Bates, 1891
- Bembidion andreae (Fabricius, 1787)
- Bembidion andrewesi Jedlicka, 1932
- Bembidion angelieri (de Saludo, 1970)
- Bembidion angulicolle (Putzeys, 1878)
- Bembidion anguliferum (LeConte, 1852)
- Bembidion angustatum Baehr, 1995
- Bembidion antarcticum Fairmaire, 1889
- Bembidion antennarium (Morvan, 1972)
- Bembidion anthracinum Germain, 1906
- Bembidion antiquum Dejean, 1831
- Bembidion antoinei Puel, 1935
- Bembidion aparupa Schmidt, 2018
- Bembidion apicale Ménétriés, 1832
- Bembidion approximatum (LeConte, 1852)
- Bembidion aratum (LeConte, 1852)
- Bembidion arcticum Lindroth, 1963
- Bembidion arenobile Maddison, 2008
- Bembidion argaeicola Ganglbauer, 1905
- Bembidion argenteolum Ahrens, 1812
- Bembidion aricense (Jeannel, 1962)
- Bembidion armeniacum Chaudoir, 1846
- Bembidion armuelles Erwin, 1982
- Bembidion articulatoides Jedlicka, 1932
- Bembidion articulatum (Panzer, 1796)
- Bembidion ascendens K.Daniel, 1902
- Bembidion asiaeminoris Netolitzky, 1935
- Bembidion asiaticum Jedlicka, 1965
- Bembidion aspericolle (Germar, 1829)
- Bembidion assimile Gyllenhal, 1810
- Bembidion astrabadense (Mannerheim, 1844)
- Bembidion ateradustum Liebherr, 2008
- Bembidion atillense Toledano, 2008
- Bembidion atlanticum Wollaston, 1854
- Bembidion atomarium (Sharp, 1903)
- Bembidion atripes (Motschulsky, 1844)
- Bembidion atrocaeruleum (Stephens, 1828)
- Bembidion atrox Andrewes, 1935
- Bembidion atrum Germain, 1906
- Bembidion aubei Solier, 1849
- Bembidion augusti Neri & Toledano, 2021
- Bembidion augustovignai Toledano, Bonavita & Schmidt, 2021
- Bembidion auratum (Perkins, 1917)
- Bembidion aureofuscum Bates, 1883
- Bembidion australe (Bonavita & Taglianti, 2021)
- Bembidion auxiliator Casey, 1924
- Bembidion avaricum Belousov & Sokolov, 1988
- Bembidion avidum Casey, 1918
- Bembidion axillare (Motschulsky, 1844)
- Bembidion azuayi Moret & Toledano, 2002
- Bembidion azurescens Dalla Torre, 1877

=== B ===
- Bembidion babaulti Andrewes, 1924
- Bembidion bactrianum K.Daniel, 1902
- Bembidion badakshanicum Mikhailov, 1988
- Bembidion baehri Toledano, 2000
- Bembidion baghlanicum Kirschenhofer, 1989
- Bembidion baicalicum (Motschulsky, 1844)
- Bembidion bakeri Andrewes, 1924
- Bembidion balcanicum Apfelbeck, 1899
- Bembidion baleense Toledano, Bonavita & Schmidt, 2021
- Bembidion balli Lindroth, 1962
- Bembidion bamyanense Neri & Toledano, 2018
- Bembidion bandotaro Morita, 1991
- Bembidion barkamense Toledano, 1998
- Bembidion barrense Erwin, 1982
- Bembidion basicorne Notman, 1920
- Bembidion basilewskyi (Bonavita & Taglianti, 2021)
- Bembidion basiplagiatum (Putzeys, 1878)
- Bembidion basistriatum Fairmaire, 1893
- Bembidion bedelianum Netolitzky, 1918
- Bembidion beesoni Andrewes, 1933
- Bembidion bellorum Maddison, 2008
- Bembidion beloborodovi Belousov & Mikhailov, 1990
- Bembidion belousovi Toledano, 2000
- Bembidion beutelsbach Neri & Toledano, 2020
- Bembidion bibliani Moret & Toledano, 2002
- Bembidion bicikense (Bonavita & Taglianti, 2010)
- Bembidion bicolor (Bonniard de Saludo, 1970)
- Bembidion bifossulatum (LeConte, 1852)
- Bembidion biguttatum (Fabricius, 1779)
- Bembidion bimaculatum (Kirby, 1837)
- Bembidion birulai Poppius, 1910
- Bembidion bisulcatum (Chaudoir, 1844)
- Bembidion blackburni (Sharp, 1903)
- Bembidion blandulum Netolitzky, 1910
- Bembidion bodenheimeri Netolitzky, 1935
- Bembidion bolivari Moret & Toledano, 2002
- Bembidion bolsoni Toledano, 2002
- Bembidion bonariense Boheman, 1858
- Bembidion bonniardae Toledano, 2002
- Bembidion bordoni Toledano, 2008
- Bembidion botezati Netolitzky, 1922
- Bembidion bowditchii LeConte, 1878
- Bembidion boyaca Toledano, 2008
- Bembidion bracculatum Bates, 1889
- Bembidion brachythorax Lindroth, 1963
- Bembidion braminum Andrewes, 1923
- Bembidion brancuccii Toledano, 2000
- Bembidion breve (Motschulsky, 1845)
- Bembidion brevistriatum Hayward, 1897
- Bembidion brittoni Fassati, 1955
- Bembidion brullei Gemminger & Harold, 1868
- Bembidion brunnicorne Dejean, 1831
- Bembidion brunoi (Bonavita, 2001)
- Bembidion bruxellense Wesmael, 1835
- Bembidion bryanti Andrewes, 1921
- Bembidion bualei du Val, 1852
- Bembidion bucephalum Netolitzky, 1920
- Bembidion bugnioni K.Daniel, 1902
- Bembidion bulgani Jedlicka, 1968
- Bembidion bulirschianum Toledano & Schmidt, 2008
- Bembidion bullerense Larochelle & Larivière, 2015
- Bembidion buxtoni (Basilewsky, 1953)

=== C ===
- Bembidion californicum Hayward, 1897
- Bembidion caligatum Jeanne & Müller-Motzfeld, 1982
- Bembidion callacalla Toledano, 2008
- Bembidion callens Casey, 1918
- Bembidion callipeplum Bates, 1878
- Bembidion callosum Küster, 1847
- Bembidion calverti Germain, 1906
- Bembidion camposi Moret & Toledano, 2002
- Bembidion canadianum Casey, 1924
- Bembidion cantalicum Fauvel, 1885
- Bembidion caporiaccoi Netolitzky, 1935
- Bembidion captivorum Netolitzky, 1943
- Bembidion caricum J.Sahlberg, 1908
- Bembidion carinatum (LeConte, 1852)
- Bembidion carinula Chaudoir, 1868
- Bembidion carnifex Netolitzky, 1922
- Bembidion carolinense Casey, 1924
- Bembidion carreli Moret & Toledano, 2002
- Bembidion cassinense (Roig-Juñent & Gianuca, 2001)
- Bembidion cassolai (Bonavita & Taglianti, 1993)
- Bembidion castaneipenne du Val, 1852
- Bembidion castor Lindroth, 1963
- Bembidion catharinae Netolitzky, 1943
- Bembidion caucasicum (Motschulsky, 1844)
- Bembidion cavazzutii Toledano & Schmidt, 2008
- Bembidion cayambense Bates, 1891
- Bembidion cekalovici (Jeannel, 1962)
- Bembidion cekalovicianum Toledano, 2002
- Bembidion celisi (Basilewsky, 1955)
- Bembidion chaklaense Schmidt, 2018
- Bembidion chakrata Andrewes, 1935
- Bembidion chalceipes Bates, 1878
- Bembidion chalceum Dejean, 1831
- Bembidion chalcodes Andrewes, 1935
- Bembidion chalmeri (Broun, 1886)
- Bembidion championi Bates, 1882
- Bembidion charile Bates, 1867
- Bembidion charon Andrewes, 1926
- Bembidion chaudoirianum Csiki, 1928
- Bembidion chaudoirii Chaudoir, 1850
- Bembidion cheyennense Casey, 1918
- Bembidion chilense Solier, 1849
- Bembidion chilesi Moret & Toledano, 2002
- Bembidion chimborazonum Bates, 1891
- Bembidion chinense Csiki, 1901
- Bembidion chiriqui Erwin, 1982
- Bembidion chloreum Bates, 1873
- Bembidion chloropus Bates, 1883
- Bembidion chlorostictum Reed, 1874
- Bembidion christophi Schmidt, 2018
- Bembidion cilicicum De Monte, 1947
- Bembidion cillenoides Jensen-Haarup, 1910
- Bembidion cimmerium Andrewes, 1922
- Bembidion circassicum (Reitter, 1890)
- Bembidion cirtense Netolitzky, 1914
- Bembidion citulum Casey, 1918
- Bembidion ciudadense Bates, 1891
- Bembidion clarkei (Bonavita & Taglianti, 2021)
- Bembidion clarkii (Dawson, 1849)
- Bembidion clarum Andrewes, 1923
- Bembidion clemens Casey, 1918
- Bembidion cnemidotum Bates, 1883
- Bembidion cocuyanum Toledano, 2008
- Bembidion coecum (Sharp, 1903)
- Bembidion coelestinum (Motschulsky, 1844)
- Bembidion coeruleum Audinet-Serville, 1821
- Bembidion cognatum Dejean, 1831
- Bembidion collutum Bates, 1873
- Bembidion colombianum Toledano, 2008
- Bembidion coloradense Hayward, 1897
- Bembidion colvillense Lindroth, 1965
- Bembidion combustum Ménétriés, 1832
- Bembidion commissum Erichson, 1847
- Bembidion commotum Casey, 1918
- Bembidion compactum Andrewes, 1922
- Bembidion complanatum Heer, 1837
- Bembidion complanulum (Mannerheim, 1853)
- Bembidion compressum Lindroth, 1963
- Bembidion concoeruleum Netolitzky, 1943
- Bembidion concolor (Kirby, 1837)
- Bembidion concretum Casey, 1918
- Bembidion conforme Dejean, 1831
- Bembidion confusum Hayward, 1897
- Bembidion conicolle Motschulsky, 1844
- Bembidion connivens (LeConte, 1852)
- Bembidion consanguineum Hayward, 1897
- Bembidion consimile Hayward, 1897
- Bembidion conspersum Chaudoir, 1868
- Bembidion constricticolle Hayward, 1897
- Bembidion constrictum (LeConte, 1847)
- Bembidion consuetum Casey, 1918
- Bembidion consummatum Bates, 1873
- Bembidion contractum Say, 1823
- Bembidion convergens C.Berg, 1883
- Bembidion convexiusculum (Motschulsky, 1844)
- Bembidion convexulum Hayward, 1897
- Bembidion cooperi Maddison, 2014
- Bembidion cooteri Toledano & Schmidt, 2008
- Bembidion cordatum (LeConte, 1847)
- Bembidion cordicolle du Val, 1852
- Bembidion cordillerae Steinheil, 1869
- Bembidion coreanum Jedlicka, 1946
- Bembidion corgenoma Maddison, 2020
- Bembidion corsicum Csiki, 1928
- Bembidion cortes Erwin, 1982
- Bembidion corticarium (Sharp, 1903)
- Bembidion cosangaense Toledano, 2008
- Bembidion cotopaxi Moret & Toledano, 2002
- Bembidion coxendix Say, 1823
- Bembidion crassicorne Putzeys, 1872
- Bembidion crenulatum Sahlberg, 1844
- Bembidion crotchii Wollaston, 1864
- Bembidion cruciatum Dejean, 1831
- Bembidion csikii Jedlicka, 1932
- Bembidion cubanum Darlington, 1937
- Bembidion culminicola de la Brûlerie, 1876
- Bembidion cumanum Lutshnik, 1938
- Bembidion cupido Andrewes, 1935
- Bembidion cupreolum Solsky, 1874
- Bembidion cupreostriatum Germain, 1906
- Bembidion curtulatum Casey, 1918
- Bembidion curtulum du Val, 1851
- Bembidion cyaneum Chaudoir, 1846
- Bembidion cyclodes Bates, 1884
- Bembidion cymindulum Andrewes, 1930

=== D ===
- Bembidion dabashanicum Toledano & Schmidt, 2010
- Bembidion daccordii Toledano, 2005
- Bembidion dagestanum Jedlicka, 1962
- Bembidion daisetsuzanum Habu, 1958
- Bembidion daliangi Toledano, 2000
- Bembidion dalmatinum Dejean, 1831
- Bembidion dammermani Andrewes, 1933
- Bembidion damota Toledano; Bonavita & Schmidt, 2021
- Bembidion dannieae Perrault, 1982
- Bembidion darlingtoni Mutchler, 1934
- Bembidion darlingtonicum Jedlicka, 1951
- Bembidion darlingtonielum Cooper & Maddison, 2014
- Bembidion dauricum (Motschulsky, 1844)
- Bembidion davaai Jedlicka, 1968
- Bembidion davatchii (Morvan, 1971)
- Bembidion davidsoni Moret & Toledano, 2002
- Bembidion daxuense Toledano, 1998
- Bembidion debiliceps Casey, 1918
- Bembidion decolor Apfelbeck, 1911
- Bembidion decorum (Panzer, 1799)
- Bembidion degeense Toledano & Schmidt, 2008
- Bembidion dehiscens Broun, 1893
- Bembidion dejectum Casey, 1884
- Bembidion delamarei (Jeannel, 1962)
- Bembidion deletum Audinet-Serville, 1821
- Bembidion deliae (Morvan, 1973)
- Bembidion demartini Neri & Gudenzi, 2011
- Bembidion demeyeri Toledano & Bonavita, 2016
- Bembidion demidenkoae Dudko, 1999
- Bembidion dentelloides Netolitzky, 1943
- Bembidion dentellum (Thunberg, 1787)
- Bembidion deplanatum A.Morawitz, 1862
- Bembidion depressicolle Landin, 1955
- Bembidion depressiusculum (Motschulsky, 1850)
- Bembidion depressum Ménétriés, 1832
- Bembidion derbesi Solier, 1849
- Bembidion derelictum Alluaud, 1926
- Bembidion dhaulaghiricum Schmidt, 2018
- Bembidion diabola Erwin, 1982
- Bembidion dicksoniae Wollaston, 1877
- Bembidion dieckmanni Fassati, 1957
- Bembidion difficile (Motschulsky, 1844)
- Bembidion difforme (Motschulsky, 1844)
- Bembidion diligens Casey, 1918
- Bembidion dilutipenne Solsky, 1874
- Bembidion dimidiatum Ménétriés, 1832
- Bembidion discoideum Brullé, 1843
- Bembidion discordans Netolitzky, 1935
- Bembidion distinguendum du Val, 1852
- Bembidion dolorosum (Motschulsky, 1850)
- Bembidion doris (Panzer, 1796)
- Bembidion dormeyeri Reitter, 1897
- Bembidion dorsale Say, 1823
- Bembidion drago (Basilewsky, 1958)
- Bembidion dudichi Csiki, 1928
- Bembidion dufourii Perris, 1864
- Bembidion durangoense Bates, 1891
- Bembidion duvali Steinheil, 1869
- Bembidion dyscheres Netolitzky, 1943
- Bembidion dyschirinum LeConte, 1861

=== E ===
- Bembidion eburneonigrum Germain, 1906
- Bembidion echarouxi Toledano, 2000
- Bembidion echigonum Habu & Baba, 1957
- Bembidion edwardsi Erwin, 1982
- Bembidion egens Casey, 1918
- Bembidion ehikoense Habu, 1984
- Bembidion eichleri Marggi; Wrase & Huber, 2002
- Bembidion ejusmodi Landin, 1955
- Bembidion elatum Andrewes, 1930
- Bembidion elbursicum Netolitzky, 1939
- Bembidion eleonorae (Bonavita & Taglianti, 1993)
- Bembidion elevatum (Motschulsky, 1844)
- Bembidion elizabethae Hatch, 1950
- Bembidion ellipticocurtum Netolitzky, 1935
- Bembidion embersoni Lindroth, 1980
- Bembidion endymion Andrewes, 1935
- Bembidion engelhardti Jensen-Haarup, 1910
- Bembidion ephippigerum (LeConte, 1852)
- Bembidion ephippium (Marsham, 1802)
- Bembidion epistomale (Jeannel, 1962)
- Bembidion equatoriale Van Dyke, 1953
- Bembidion eques Sturm, 1825
- Bembidion eregliense Jedlicka, 1961
- Bembidion erosum (Motschulsky, 1850)
- Bembidion errans Blackburn, 1888
- Bembidion erwini Perrault, 1982
- Bembidion escherichi Ganglbauer, 1897
- Bembidion espejoense Perrault, 1991
- Bembidion eucheres Netolitzky, 1943
- Bembidion eurydice Andrewes, 1926
- Bembidion eurygonum Bates, 1883
- Bembidion eutherum Andrewes, 1923
- Bembidion evanescens Wollaston, 1877
- Bembidion evidens Casey, 1918
- Bembidion exornatum Andrewes, 1930
- Bembidion exquisitum Andrewes, 1923

=== F ===
- Bembidion facchinii Toledano, 1998
- Bembidion falsum Blaisdell, 1902
- Bembidion farkaci Toledano & Sciaky, 1998
- Bembidion farrarae Hatch, 1950
- Bembidion fasciolatum (Duftschmid, 1812)
- Bembidion fassatii Jedlicka, 1951
- Bembidion fellmanni (Mannerheim, 1823)
- Bembidion femoratum Sturm, 1825
- Bembidion ferghanicum Müller-Motzfeld & Kryzhanovskij, 1983
- Bembidion fischeri Solier, 1849
- Bembidion flavescens Baehr, 1995
- Bembidion flavoposticatum du Val, 1855
- Bembidion flohri Bates, 1878
- Bembidion fluviatile Dejean, 1831
- Bembidion fontinale Raffray, 1886
- Bembidion foochowense Lindroth, 1980
- Bembidion foraminosum Sturm, 1825
- Bembidion foraticolle (Jeanne, 1995)
- Bembidion formosanum (Dupuis, 1912)
- Bembidion fortestriatum (Motschulsky, 1845)
- Bembidion fortunatum Wollaston, 1871
- Bembidion fossor Wollaston, 1877
- Bembidion foveatum W.J.MacLeay, 1871
- Bembidion foveolatum Dejean, 1831
- Bembidion foveum Motschulsky, 1844
- Bembidion francisci Neri & Gudenzi, 2013
- Bembidion franiae Erwin, 1982
- Bembidion franzi Fassati, 1957
- Bembidion fraxator Ménétriés, 1832
- Bembidion friebi Netolitzky, 1914
- Bembidion frontale (LeConte, 1847)
- Bembidion fuchsii Blaisdell, 1902
- Bembidion fugax (LeConte, 1848)
- Bembidion fujiyamai Habu, 1958
- Bembidion fulgens (Sharp, 1903)
- Bembidion fuliginosum Netolitzky, 1914
- Bembidion fulvipenne (Schuler, 1959)
- Bembidion fulvipes Sturm, 1827
- Bembidion fulvocinctum Bates, 1891
- Bembidion fumatum (Motschulsky, 1850)
- Bembidion fumigatum (Duftschmid, 1812)
- Bembidion fusiforme Netolitzky, 1914

=== G ===
- Bembidion gabrielianum Neri & Gudenzi, 2013
- Bembidion gabrielum (Bonniard de Saludo, 1970)
- Bembidion gagates Andrewes, 1924
- Bembidion gagneorum Liebherr, 2008
- Bembidion galapagoense (G.R.Waterhouse, 1845)
- Bembidion gansuense Jedlicka, 1965
- Bembidion gassneri Netolitzky, 1922
- Bembidion gautieri Netolitzky, 1921
- Bembidion gazella Antoine, 1925
- Bembidion geberti Marggi, 2011
- Bembidion gebieni Netolitzky, 1928
- Bembidion gebleri (Gebler, 1833)
- Bembidion gemmulipenne Wollaston, 1877
- Bembidion genei Küster, 1847
- Bembidion geniculatum Heer, 1837
- Bembidion geopearlis Sproul & Maddison, 2018
- Bembidion georgeballi Toledano, 2008
- Bembidion georgettae Perrault, 1982
- Bembidion gerdi Mikhailov, 1995
- Bembidion gerdmuelleri Toledano & Schmidt, 2010
- Bembidion germainianum Toledano, 2002
- Bembidion gersdorfi Fassati, 1957
- Bembidion ghilarovi Mikhailov, 1988
- Bembidion giganteum J.Sahlberg, 1900
- Bembidion gilae Lindroth, 1963
- Bembidion gilgit Andrewes, 1935
- Bembidion gilvipes Sturm, 1825
- Bembidion giselae Moret & Toledano, 2002
- Bembidion glabripenne Schmidt, 2018
- Bembidion glabrum (Motschulsky, 1850)
- Bembidion glaciale Heer, 1837
- Bembidion glasunovi Mikhailov, 1988
- Bembidion gobiense Jedlicka, 1964
- Bembidion goetzi Jedlicka, 1965
- Bembidion golem Toledano & Schmidt, 2008
- Bembidion gordoni Lindroth, 1963
- Bembidion gorilla Bonavita, Toledano & Taglianti, 2016
- Bembidion gotoense Habu, 1973
- Bembidion gotschii Chaudoir, 1846
- Bembidion graciliforme Hayward, 1897
- Bembidion gracilipenne Schmidt, 2018
- Bembidion grandiceps Hayward, 1897
- Bembidion grandipenne Schaum, 1862
- Bembidion granuliferum Lindroth, 1976
- Bembidion graphicum Casey, 1918
- Bembidion grapii Gyllenhal, 1827
- Bembidion gratiosum Casey, 1918
- Bembidion grayanum Wollaston, 1877
- Bembidion gredosanum (Jeanne, 1974)
- Bembidion grisvardi (Dewailly, 1949)
- Bembidion grosclaudei Normand, 1940
- Bembidion grossepunctatum Germain, 1906
- Bembidion guadarramense des Cottes, 1866
- Bembidion guamani Moret & Toledano, 2002
- Bembidion guaramacal Toledano, 2008
- Bembidion gudenzii (Neri, 1981)
- Bembidion guttula (Fabricius, 1792)
- Bembidion guttulatum Chaudoir, 1850
- Bembidion guttuloides De Monte, 1953
- Bembidion guzzettii Toledano, 2008

=== H ===
- Bembidion habui Jedlicka, 1965
- Bembidion hagai Morita, 2019
- Bembidion hageni Hayward, 1897
- Bembidion hajeki Toledano & Schmidt, 2008
- Bembidion haleakalae Liebherr, 2008
- Bembidion hamanense Jedlicka, 1933
- Bembidion hammondianum Müller-Motzfeld, 1988
- Bembidion hansi Jedlicka, 1932
- Bembidion haruspex Casey, 1918
- Bembidion hastii C.R.Sahlberg, 1827
- Bembidion hasurada Andrewes, 1924
- Bembidion hauserianum Netolitzky, 1918
- Bembidion havelkai Fassati, 1955
- Bembidion hayachinense Nakane, 1979
- Bembidion hebeicum Toledano, 2008
- Bembidion hebridarum Lindroth, 1980
- Bembidion heineri Toledano, 2011
- Bembidion heinzi Korge, 1971
- Bembidion heishuianum Toledano, 2008
- Bembidion herbertfranzi Toledano, 1998
- Bembidion hesperidum Wollaston, 1867
- Bembidion hesperium Fall, 1910
- Bembidion hetzeli Toledano & Schmidt, 2008
- Bembidion heydeni Ganglbauer, 1891
- Bembidion heyrovskyi Jedlicka, 1932
- Bembidion hiekei Müller-Motzfeld, 1986
- Bembidion hikosanum (Habu & Ueno, 1955)
- Bembidion himalayanum Andrewes, 1924
- Bembidion hiogoense Bates, 1873
- Bembidion hiranoi (Morita, 1996)
- Bembidion hirmocaelum Chaudoir, 1850
- Bembidion hirtipalposum Landin, 1955
- Bembidion hirtipes (Jeannel, 1962)
- Bembidion hispanicum Dejean, 1831
- Bembidion hissaricum Netolitzky, 1943
- Bembidion hittita Neri & Gudenzi, 2013
- Bembidion hoberlandti Jedlicka, 1951
- Bembidion hoberlandtianum Fassati, 1959
- Bembidion hokitikense Bates, 1878
- Bembidion holconotum Andrewes, 1935
- Bembidion honestum Say, 1823
- Bembidion hoogstraali Darlington, 1959
- Bembidion horii Morita, 2009
- Bembidion hornense (Jeannel, 1962)
- Bembidion horni Hayward, 1897
- Bembidion hosodai Morita, 2012
- Bembidion huberi Marggi, 2008
- Bembidion humboldtense Blaisdell, 1902
- Bembidion humboldti Moret & Toledano, 2002
- Bembidion humerale Sturm, 1825
- Bembidion hummleri G.Müller, 1918
- Bembidion hustachei Antoine, 1923
- Bembidion hyperboraeorum Munster, 1923
- Bembidion hypocrita Dejean, 1831
- Bembidion hysteron Netolitzky, 1943

=== I ===
- Bembidion iacobi Neri, 2017
- Bembidion ibericum de la Brûlerie, 1868
- Bembidion icterodes Alluaud, 1933
- Bembidion idoneum Casey, 1918
- Bembidion idriae Meschnigg, 1934
- Bembidion ignicola Blackburn, 1879
- Bembidion igorot Darlington, 1959
- Bembidion iliense Iablokoff-Khnzorian, 1970
- Bembidion illuchi Moret & Toledano, 2002
- Bembidion imereticum Belousov & Sokolov, 1996
- Bembidion immaturum Lindroth, 1954
- Bembidion impotens Casey, 1918
- Bembidion improvidens Casey, 1924
- Bembidion inaense Habu, 1956
- Bembidion inaequale Say, 1823
- Bembidion incisum Andrewes, 1921
- Bembidion incognitum G.Müller, 1931
- Bembidion incommodum Netolitzky, 1926
- Bembidion inconspicuum Wollaston, 1864
- Bembidion inconstans Solier, 1849
- Bembidion incrematum LeConte, 1860
- Bembidion indistinctum Dejean, 1831
- Bembidion infans Andrewes, 1930
- Bembidion infuscatipenne Netolitzky, 1938
- Bembidion infuscatum Dejean, 1831
- Bembidion innocuum Casey, 1918
- Bembidion inoptatum Schaum, 1857
- Bembidion insidiosum Solsky, 1874
- Bembidion insularum Andrewes, 1938
- Bembidion insulatum (LeConte, 1852)
- Bembidion integrum Casey, 1918
- Bembidion intermedium (Kirby, 1837)
- Bembidion interventor Lindroth, 1963
- Bembidion inventor Schmidt, 2018
- Bembidion ioheli Neri & Toledano, 2017
- Bembidion iphigenia Netolitzky, 1931
- Bembidion iricolor Bedel, 1879
- Bembidion iridescens (LeConte, 1852)
- Bembidion iridipenne Bousquet & Webster, 2006
- Bembidion irregulare Netolitzky, 1935
- Bembidion irroratum Reitter, 1891
- Bembidion ispartanum Netolitzky, 1930
- Bembidion israelita Ravizza, 1971
- Bembidion italicum De Monte, 1943
- Bembidion ivanloebli Neri & Toledano, 2018
- Bembidion ixtatan Erwin, 1982

=== J ===
- Bembidion jacksoniense Guérin-Méneville, 1830
- Bembidion jacobianum Casey, 1918
- Bembidion jacobseni Jensen-Haarup, 1910
- Bembidion jacobsoni Mikhailov, 1988
- Bembidion jacqueti (Jeannel, 1941)
- Bembidion jaechi Toledano, 2000
- Bembidion jamaicense Darlington, 1934
- Bembidion janatai Toledano, 2008
- Bembidion janczyki Neri & Toledano, 2020
- Bembidion jani Toledano, 1998
- Bembidion japonicum Jedlicka, 1961
- Bembidion jaroslavi Toledano & Schmidt, 2008
- Bembidion jeanneli Alluaud, 1939
- Bembidion jeannelicum Toledano, 2002
- Bembidion jedlickai Fassati, 1945
- Bembidion jelineki Toledano, 2009
- Bembidion jimburae Moret & Toledano, 2002
- Bembidion jintangi Toledano & Schmidt, 2008
- Bembidion joachimschmidti Toledano, 2008
- Bembidion josephi (Bonavita, 2001)
- Bembidion jucundum G.Horn, 1895
- Bembidion judaicum J.Sahlberg, 1908
- Bembidion julianum De Monte, 1943
- Bembidion justinae Meschnigg, 1947

=== K ===
- Bembidion kabakovi Mikhailov, 1984
- Bembidion kafiristanum Neri & Toledano, 2020
- Bembidion kaloprosopon Toledano & Sciaky, 2004
- Bembidion kalumae Lindroth, 1963
- Bembidion kamakou Liebherr, 2008
- Bembidion kamikochii Jedlicka, 1965
- Bembidion kara Andrewes, 1921
- Bembidion kareli Toledano, 2008
- Bembidion karikari Larochelle & Larivière, 2015
- Bembidion karinae Schmidt, 2009
- Bembidion kartalinicum Lutshnik, 1938
- Bembidion kasaharai (Habu, 1978)
- Bembidion kaschmirense Netolitzky, 1920
- Bembidion kauaiensis (Sharp, 1903)
- Bembidion kazakhstanicum Kryzhanovskij, 1979
- Bembidion kempi Andrewes, 1922
- Bembidion kenyense Alluaud, 1917
- Bembidion kermanum (Bonavita & Rebl, 2013)
- Bembidion khanakense Mikhailov, 1984
- Bembidion khuchuchani Toledano, 2008
- Bembidion kilimanum Alluaud, 1908
- Bembidion kimurai Morita, 2008
- Bembidion kiritshenkoi Mikhailov, 1984
- Bembidion kirschenhoferi (Müller-Motzfeld, 1988)
- Bembidion kishimotoi (Morita, 1996)
- Bembidion kivuanum (Basilewsky, 1951)
- Bembidion klapperichi Jedlicka, 1953
- Bembidion klapperichianum Fassati, 1957
- Bembidion klausnitzeri Schmidt & Marggi, 2014
- Bembidion klimai Neri & Gudenzi, 2013
- Bembidion kmecoi Toledano & Nakladal, 2011
- Bembidion koebelei (Sharp, 1903)
- Bembidion koikei Habu & Baba, 1960
- Bembidion kokandicum Solsky, 1874
- Bembidion kolbei C.Bruch, 1808
- Bembidion komareki Fassati, 1955
- Bembidion kryzhanovskii Mikhailov, 1988
- Bembidion kucerai Toledano, 2008
- Bembidion kuesteri Schaum, 1845
- Bembidion kuhitangi Mikhailov & Belousov, 1991
- Bembidion kulzeri Netolitzky, 1935
- Bembidion kunarense Kirschenhofer, 1989
- Bembidion kuprianovii Mannerheim, 1843
- Bembidion kurdistanicum Netolitzky, 1920
- Bembidion kurram Andrewes, 1935
- Bembidion kuscheli (Jeannel, 1962)
- Bembidion kuznetsovi Lafer, 2002
- Bembidion kyros Netolitzky, 1931

=== L ===
- Bembidion lachnophoroides Darlington, 1926
- Bembidion lacrimans Netolitzky, 1935
- Bembidion lacunarium (Zimmermann, 1869)
- Bembidion ladas Andrewes, 1924
- Bembidion laetum Brullé, 1836
- Bembidion laevibase (Reitter, 1902)
- Bembidion laevipenne G.Müller, 1918
- Bembidion lafertei du Val, 1852
- Bembidion lais Bedel, 1900
- Bembidion lamproides Netolitzky, 1920
- Bembidion lampros (Herbst, 1784)
- Bembidion lapponicum Zetterstedt, 1828
- Bembidion lares Toledano, 2008
- Bembidion latebricola Casey, 1918
- Bembidion laterale (Samouelle, 1819)
- Bembidion laticeps (LeConte, 1858)
- Bembidion laticolle (Duftschmid, 1812)
- Bembidion latinum Netolitzky, 1911
- Bembidion latiplaga Chaudoir, 1850
- Bembidion laurentii Neri & Gudenzi, 2013
- Bembidion lavernae Erwin, 1982
- Bembidion laxatum Casey, 1918
- Bembidion lecontei Csiki, 1928
- Bembidion leleupi (Basilewsky, 1954)
- Bembidion lenae Csiki, 1928
- Bembidion leonense Jeanne & Müller-Motzfeld, 1982
- Bembidion leonhardi Netolitzky, 1909
- Bembidion leptaleum Andrewes, 1922
- Bembidion leucolenum Bates, 1873
- Bembidion leucoscelis Chaudoir, 1850
- Bembidion leve Andrewes, 1924
- Bembidion levettei Casey, 1918
- Bembidion leytense Baehr, 1995
- Bembidion lhai Schmidt, 2018
- Bembidion lhatseense Schmidt, 2018
- Bembidion liangi Toledano & Schmidt, 2008
- Bembidion liliputanum (J.Sahlberg, 1908)
- Bembidion limatum Andrewes, 1924
- Bembidion linauense Müller-Motzfeld, 1988
- Bembidion liparum Andrewes, 1936
- Bembidion lirykense Reitter, 1908
- Bembidion lissonotoides Kirschenhofer, 1989
- Bembidion lissonotum Bates, 1873
- Bembidion litorale (Olivier, 1790)
- Bembidion livens Andrewes, 1930
- Bembidion lividulum Casey, 1918
- Bembidion lobanovi Mikhailov, 1984
- Bembidion loebli Schmidt, 2014
- Bembidion loeffleri Jedlicka, 1963
- Bembidion lonae Jensen-Haarup, 1910
- Bembidion longipenne Putzeys, 1845
- Bembidion longipes K.Daniel, 1902
- Bembidion longriba Toledano & Schmidt, 2008
- Bembidion lorenzi Toledano, 2002
- Bembidion loricatum Andrewes, 1922
- Bembidion lorquinii Chaudoir, 1868
- Bembidion loscondesi Toledano, 2002
- Bembidion louisella Maddison, 2008
- Bembidion lucifugum (Neri & Pavesi, 1989)
- Bembidion lucillum Bates, 1883
- Bembidion luculentum Casey, 1918
- Bembidion lugubre LeConte, 1857
- Bembidion luhuoense Toledano, 1998
- Bembidion luisae Toledano, 2000
- Bembidion lulinense Habu, 1973
- Bembidion lunatum (Duftschmid, 1812)
- Bembidion lunepabomaguvi Schmidt, 2018
- Bembidion luniferum Andrewes, 1924
- Bembidion lunulatum (Geoffroy, 1785)
- Bembidion luridicorne Solsky, 1874
- Bembidion luristanicum Neri & Toledano, 2018
- Bembidion luteipes (Motschulsky, 1844)
- Bembidion lysander Andrewes, 1935

=== M ===
- Bembidion mackinderi Alluaud, 1917
- Bembidion macrogonum Bates, 1891
- Bembidion macropterum J.Sahlberg, 1880
- Bembidion maculatum Dejean, 1831
- Bembidion maculiferum Gemminger & Harold, 1868
- Bembidion madagascariense Chaudoir, 1876
- Bembidion maddisoni Toledano, 2000
- Bembidion magellense Schauberger, 1922
- Bembidion magrinii Toledano, 2011
- Bembidion mallmaense Toledano, 2008
- Bembidion mandarin Netolitzky, 1939
- Bembidion mandibulare Solier, 1849
- Bembidion manfredschmidi Kirschenhofer, 1985
- Bembidion mangamuka Larochelle & Larivière, 2015
- Bembidion manicatum Andrewes, 1935
- Bembidion mannerheimii C.R.Sahlberg, 1827
- Bembidion manningense Lindroth, 1969
- Bembidion maorinum Bates, 1867
- Bembidion marggii Schmidt, 2004
- Bembidion marginatum Solier, 1849
- Bembidion marginipenne Solsky, 1874
- Bembidion maritimum (Stephens, 1839)
- Bembidion maroccanum Antoine, 1923
- Bembidion martachemai (Toribio, 2002)
- Bembidion marthae Reitter, 1902
- Bembidion marussii De Monte, 1956
- Bembidion massaicum (Antoine, 1962)
- Bembidion mastersi Sloane, 1895
- Bembidion mathani Moret & Toledano, 2002
- Bembidion mauritii (Bonavita & Taglianti, 2010)
- Bembidion mckinleyi Fall, 1926
- Bembidion megalops (Wollaston, 1877)
- Bembidion melanoceroides Toledano, Bonavita & Schmidt, 2021
- Bembidion melanocerum Chaudoir, 1876
- Bembidion melanopodum Solier, 1849
- Bembidion mellissii Wollaston, 1869
- Bembidion menander Andrewes, 1935
- Bembidion mendocinum Jensen-Haarup, 1910
- Bembidion menetriesii (Kolenati, 1845)
- Bembidion meruanum (Basilewsky, 1962)
- Bembidion merum Jedlicka, 1933
- Bembidion mesasiaticum Mikhailov, 1988
- Bembidion meschniggi Netolitzky, 1943
- Bembidion mexicanum Dejean, 1831
- Bembidion mikitjukovi Mikhailov, 1997
- Bembidion mikyskai Toledano & Schmidt, 2008
- Bembidion milleri du Val, 1852
- Bembidion milosfassatii Schmidt, 2004
- Bembidion mimbres Maddison, 2020
- Bembidion mimekara Toledano & Schmidt, 2010
- Bembidion mimus Hayward, 1897
- Bembidion mingrelicum Belousov & Sokolov, 1994
- Bembidion minimum (Fabricius, 1792)
- Bembidion minoum C.Huber & Marggi, 1997
- Bembidion mirasoi Jensen-Haarup, 1910
- Bembidion mirzayani (Morvan, 1973)
- Bembidion misellum Harold, 1877
- Bembidion miwai Jedlicka, 1946
- Bembidion mixtum Schaum, 1863
- Bembidion modestum (Fabricius, 1801)
- Bembidion modocianum Casey, 1924
- Bembidion montanum Rambur, 1838
- Bembidion montei Fassati, 1959
- Bembidion monticola Sturm, 1825
- Bembidion morawitzi Csiki, 1928
- Bembidion moreti Toledano, 2008
- Bembidion moritai Toledano, 2000
- Bembidion mormon Hayward, 1897
- Bembidion morulum LeConte, 1863
- Bembidion morvanianum Müller-Motzfeld, 1986
- Bembidion motschulskyi Csiki, 1928
- Bembidion motzfeldi Belousov & Sokolov, 1994
- Bembidion m-signatum Jensen-Haarup, 1910
- Bembidion mucubaji Perrault, 1991
- Bembidion muellermotzfeldi Toledano, 2000
- Bembidion muemo Rebl & Toledano, 2014
- Bembidion muilwijki Neri & Toledano, 2017
- Bembidion multipunctatum (Motschulsky, 1850)
- Bembidion mundatum Netolitzky, 1920
- Bembidion mundum (LeConte, 1852)
- Bembidion munroi (Sharp, 1903)
- Bembidion murrilloense Toledano, 2008
- Bembidion mus Netolitzky, 1931
- Bembidion musae Broun, 1882
- Bembidion muscicola Hayward, 1897
- Bembidion mutatum Gemminger & Harold, 1868

=== N ===
- Bembidion nahuala Erwin, 1982
- Bembidion nakamurai (Morita, 2008)
- Bembidion namtso Schmidt, 2018
- Bembidion narzikulovi Kryzhanovskij, 1972
- Bembidion nebraskense LeConte, 1863
- Bembidion negreanum Toledano, 2002
- Bembidion negrei Habu, 1958
- Bembidion nemrutdagi Toledano & Rebl, 2006
- Bembidion neocoerulescens Bousquet, 1993
- Bembidion neodelamarei Toledano, 2008
- Bembidion neresheimeri G.Müller, 1929
- Bembidion nerii Toledano, 2008
- Bembidion netolitzkyanum Schatzmayr, 1940
- Bembidion netolitzkyi Krausse, 1910
- Bembidion nevadense Ulke, 1875
- Bembidion nigricorne Gyllenhal, 1827
- Bembidion nigripes (Kirby, 1837)
- Bembidion nigritum Solier, 1849
- Bembidion nigrivestis Bousquet, 2006
- Bembidion nigrocoeruleum Hayward, 1897
- Bembidion nigropiceum (Marsham, 1802)
- Bembidion nigrum Say, 1823
- Bembidion niloticum Dejean, 1831
- Bembidion nipponicum (Habu & Ueno, 1955)
- Bembidion nirasawai Morita, 2008
- Bembidion nisekoense Morita, 2019
- Bembidion nishidai Morita, 2009
- Bembidion nitidicolle Bousquet, 2006
- Bembidion nitidum (Kirby, 1837)
- Bembidion nivicola Andrewes, 1923
- Bembidion nobile Rottenberg, 1870
- Bembidion nogalesium Casey, 1924
- Bembidion nonaginta Toledano, 2008
- Bembidion normannum Dejean, 1831
- Bembidion notatum Andrewes, 1922
- Bembidion nubiculosum Chaudoir, 1868
- Bembidion nubigena Wollaston, 1877
- Bembidion nudipenne Lindroth, 1963
- Bembidion nuncaestimatum Netolitzky, 1939
- Bembidion nuristanum Neri & Toledano, 2020

=== O ===
- Bembidion obenbergeri Lutshnik, 1928
- Bembidion oberthueri Hayward, 1901
- Bembidion obliquulum LeConte, 1859
- Bembidion obliquum Sturm, 1825
- Bembidion obliteratum Solier, 1849
- Bembidion obscurellum (Motschulsky, 1845)
- Bembidion obscuripenne Blaisdell, 1902
- Bembidion obscuromaculatum (Motschulsky, 1859)
- Bembidion obtusangulum LeConte, 1863
- Bembidion obtusidens Fall, 1922
- Bembidion obtusum Audinet-Serville, 1821
- Bembidion occultator Notman, 1920
- Bembidion ochsi (Schuler, 1959)
- Bembidion octomaculatum (Goeze, 1777)
- Bembidion ocylum Jedlicka, 1933
- Bembidion ohkurai Morita, 1992
- Bembidion ohtsukai (Morita, 1996)
- Bembidion okavangum (Bonavita & Taglianti, 2021)
- Bembidion okinawanum (Morita, 2009)
- Bembidion olegleonidovici Fassati, 1990
- Bembidion olemartini Kirschenhofer, 1984
- Bembidion olympicum De Monte, 1946
- Bembidion onorei Moret & Toledano, 2002
- Bembidion onsen Morita, 2010
- Bembidion operosum Casey, 1918
- Bembidion oppressum Casey, 1918
- Bembidion opulentum Nietner, 1858
- Bembidion orbiferum Bates, 1878
- Bembidion oregonense Hatch, 1953
- Bembidion orinum Andrewes, 1922
- Bembidion orion Cooper & Maddison, 2014
- Bembidion oromaia Sproul & Maddison, 2018
- Bembidion orregoi Germain, 1906
- Bembidion ortsi Netolitzky, 1938
- Bembidion ovale (Motschulsky, 1844)
- Bembidion ovalipenne (Solsky, 1874)
- Bembidion ovoideum Marggi & C.Huber, 1999
- Bembidion ovulum Netolitzky, 1910
- Bembidion oxapampa Toledano, 2008
- Bembidion oxyglymma Bates, 1883
- Bembidion ozakii Morita, 2010
- Bembidion ozarkense Maddison & Hildebrandt, 2011

=== P ===
- Bembidion pacificum Blackburn, 1878
- Bembidion paediscum Bates, 1883
- Bembidion paganettii Netolitzky, 1914
- Bembidion pallideguttula Jensen-Haarup, 1910
- Bembidion pallidicorne G.Müller, 1921
- Bembidion pallidipenne (Illiger, 1802)
- Bembidion pallidiveste Carret, 1905
- Bembidion palosverdes Kavanaugh & Erwin, 1992
- Bembidion pamiricola Lutshnik, 1930
- Bembidion panda Toledano, 2000
- Bembidion paracomplanatum Nitzu, 1995
- Bembidion paraenulum Maddison, 2009
- Bembidion parallelipenne Chaudoir, 1850
- Bembidion paralongulum Toledano, 2002
- Bembidion paratomarium Liebherr, 2008
- Bembidion parconaturaviva Toledano & Schmidt, 2010
- Bembidion parepum Jedlicka, 1933
- Bembidion parsorum Netolitzky, 1934
- Bembidion parviceps Bates, 1878
- Bembidion parvum (Jeannel, 1962)
- Bembidion pascoense Toledano, 2008
- Bembidion patris Schmidt, 2010
- Bembidion patruele Dejean, 1831
- Bembidion paulinae Moret & Toledano, 2002
- Bembidion paulinoi Heyden, 1870
- Bembidion pavesii Toledano & Schmidt, 2008
- Bembidion pedestre (Motschulsky, 1844)
- Bembidion pedicellatum LeConte, 1857
- Bembidion peleum Jedlicka, 1933
- Bembidion peliopterum Chaudoir, 1850
- Bembidion penai Toledano, 2002
- Bembidion penninum Netolitzky, 1918
- Bembidion perbrevicolle Casey, 1924
- Bembidion perditum Netolitzky, 1920
- Bembidion perkinsi (Sharp, 1903)
- Bembidion pernotum Casey, 1918
- Bembidion perraulti Moret & Toledano, 2002
- Bembidion persephone Andrewes, 1926
- Bembidion persicum Ménétriés, 1832
- Bembidion persimile A.Morawitz, 1862
- Bembidion perspicuum (LeConte, 1848)
- Bembidion peruvianum Brèthes, 1920
- Bembidion peterseni Jensen-Haarup, 1910
- Bembidion petrimagni Netolitzky, 1920
- Bembidion petrosum Gebler, 1833
- Bembidion pfizenmayeri Netolitzky, 1943
- Bembidion phaedrum Andrewes, 1923
- Bembidion philippii Germain, 1906
- Bembidion phoeniceum C.Huber & Marggi, 1997
- Bembidion phryganobium Belousov & Sokolov, 1996
- Bembidion piceocyaneum Solsky, 1874
- Bembidion pichincha Toledano, 2008
- Bembidion picturatum Fairmaire, 1898
- Bembidion pieroi Toledano, 2000
- Bembidion pierrei Toledano, 2008
- Bembidion pilatei Chaudoir, 1868
- Bembidion pimanum Casey, 1918
- Bembidion pindicum Apfelbeck, 1901
- Bembidion pinkeri Netolitzky, 1935
- Bembidion pinnigerum Schmidt, 2018
- Bembidion placeranum Casey, 1924
- Bembidion placitum Bates, 1878
- Bembidion plagiatum (Zimmermann, 1869)
- Bembidion planatum (LeConte, 1847)
- Bembidion planiusculum Mannerheim, 1843
- Bembidion planum (Haldeman, 1843)
- Bembidion platyderoides (Wollaston, 1877)
- Bembidion platynoides Hayward, 1897
- Bembidion platypterum (Solsky, 1874)
- Bembidion pliculatum Bates, 1883
- Bembidion plutenkoi Toledano, 2008
- Bembidion pluto Andrewes, 1924
- Bembidion poculare Bates, 1884
- Bembidion pogonoides Bates, 1883
- Bembidion pogonopsis Alluaud, 1933
- Bembidion poli Toledano & Sciaky, 2004
- Bembidion politum (Motschulsky, 1845)
- Bembidion poppii Netolitzky, 1914
- Bembidion portoricense Darlington, 1939
- Bembidion posticale Germain, 1906
- Bembidion postremum Say, 1830
- Bembidion praeceptor Schmidt, 2018
- Bembidion praecinctum LeConte, 1879
- Bembidion praeustum Dejean, 1831
- Bembidion prasinum (Duftschmid, 1812)
- Bembidion praticola Lindroth, 1963
- Bembidion problematicum Schmidt, 2018
- Bembidion prokopenkoi Mikhailov, 1995
- Bembidion properans (Stephens, 1828)
- Bembidion proportionale Jensen-Haarup, 1910
- Bembidion proprium Blackburn, 1888
- Bembidion proteron Netolitzky, 1920
- Bembidion pseudascendens Manderbach & Müller-Motzfeld, 2004
- Bembidion pseudocautum Lindroth, 1963
- Bembidion pseudoclarum Schmidt, 2018
- Bembidion pseudocyaneum Belousov & Sokolov, 1994
- Bembidion pseudokara Toledano & Schmidt, 2010
- Bembidion pseudolucillum Netolitzky, 1938
- Bembidion pseudosiebkei Kirschenhofer, 1984
- Bembidion pseudovale Toledano, 2008
- Bembidion psilodorum Andrewes, 1933
- Bembidion psuchrum Andrewes, 1922
- Bembidion pulcherrimum (Motschulsky, 1850)
- Bembidion punctatellum (Motschulsky, 1844)
- Bembidion punctatostriatum Say, 1823
- Bembidion punctigerum Solier, 1849
- Bembidion punctulatum Drapiez, 1820
- Bembidion punctulipenne Bates, 1878
- Bembidion puponga Larochelle & Larivière, 2015
- Bembidion purkynei Jedlicka, 1932
- Bembidion purulha Erwin, 1982
- Bembidion putzeysi Csiki, 1928
- Bembidion pygmaeum (Fabricius, 1792)
- Bembidion pyrenaeum Dejean, 1831
- Bembidion pyxidum Moret & Toledano, 2002

=== Q ===
- Bembidion qinghaicum Toledano, 1998
- Bembidion quadratulum Notman, 1920
- Bembidion quadricolle (Motschulsky, 1844)
- Bembidion quadrifossulatum Schaum, 1862
- Bembidion quadrifoveolatum Mannerheim, 1843
- Bembidion quadriimpressum (Motschulsky, 1860)
- Bembidion quadrimaculatum (Linnaeus, 1760)
- Bembidion quadriplagiatum (Motschulsky, 1844)
- Bembidion quadripustulatum Audinet-Serville, 1821
- Bembidion quadrulum LeConte, 1861
- Bembidion quailaicum Kirschenhofer, 1984
- Bembidion quebrada Toledano, 2008
- Bembidion quetzal Erwin, 1982

=== R ===
- Bembidion radians Andrewes, 1922
- Bembidion rapidum (LeConte, 1847)
- Bembidion rapola Toledano, 2008
- Bembidion rawlinsi Moret & Toledano, 2002
- Bembidion rebeccae Toledano, 1998
- Bembidion rebeccanum Toledano, 2008
- Bembidion rebli Toledano, 2008
- Bembidion rectangulum du Val, 1852
- Bembidion recticolle LeConte, 1863
- Bembidion regale Andrewes, 1922
- Bembidion regismontium Netolitzky, 1943
- Bembidion reibnitzi Schmidt, 2018
- Bembidion reichardti Lutshnik, 1930
- Bembidion reiseri Apfelbeck, 1902
- Bembidion relictum K.Daniel, 1902
- Bembidion renei Toledano, 2002
- Bembidion rengense Morita, 2009
- Bembidion renoanum Casey, 1918
- Bembidion retingense Schmidt, 2018
- Bembidion retipenne G.Müller, 1918
- Bembidion reuteri Neri & Toledano, 2020
- Bembidion rhaeticum Heer, 1837
- Bembidion rhodopense Apfelbeck, 1902
- Bembidion ricei Maddison & Toledano, 2012
- Bembidion rickmersi Reitter, 1898
- Bembidion rilong Toledano & Schmidt, 2008
- Bembidion ringueleti (Jeannel, 1962)
- Bembidion rionicum Müller-Motzfeld, 1983
- Bembidion ripicola L.Dufour, 1820
- Bembidion roberti Toledano, 2000
- Bembidion roborowskii Mikhailov, 1988
- Bembidion robusticolle Hayward, 1897
- Bembidion rogersi Bates, 1878
- Bembidion rohanum Neri & Toledano, 2017
- Bembidion rolandi Fall, 1922
- Bembidion ronfelixi Neri & Toledano, 2017
- Bembidion roosevelti Pic, 1902
- Bembidion rosslandicum Lindroth, 1963
- Bembidion rothfelsi Maddison, 2008
- Bembidion rotundicolle Bates, 1874
- Bembidion rubiginosum LeConte, 1879
- Bembidion rucillum Darlington, 1939
- Bembidion rude (Sharp, 1903)
- Bembidion ruffoi Toledano & Schmidt, 2008
- Bembidion ruficolle (Panzer, 1796)
- Bembidion rufimacula G.Müller, 1918
- Bembidion rufinum Lindroth, 1963
- Bembidion rufoplagiatum Germain, 1906
- Bembidion rufosuffusum Wollaston, 1877
- Bembidion rufotibiellum Fairmaire, 1888
- Bembidion rufotinctum Chaudoir, 1868
- Bembidion rufum Mikhailov, 1996
- Bembidion rugicolle Reiche & Saulcy, 1855
- Bembidion rugosellum (Jeannel, 1962)
- Bembidion rupicola (Kirby, 1837)
- Bembidion ruruy Makarov & Sundukov, 2014
- Bembidion rusticum Casey, 1918
- Bembidion ruthenum Tschitscherine, 1895
- Bembidion ruwenzoricum Alluaud, 1933
- Bembidion ryei Jensen-Haarup, 1910

=== S ===
- Bembidion saitoi Morita, 2009
- Bembidion sajanum Shilenkov, 1995
- Bembidion salebratum (LeConte, 1847)
- Bembidion salinarium Casey, 1918
- Bembidion salweenum Schmidt, 2014
- Bembidion samai Neri & Toledano, 2017
- Bembidion sanandresi Toledano, 2002
- Bembidion sanatum Bates, 1883
- Bembidion sanctaemarthae Darlington, 1934
- Bembidion saragurense Moret & Toledano, 2002
- Bembidion sarpedon Casey, 1918
- Bembidion satanas Andrewes, 1924
- Bembidion satelles Casey, 1918
- Bembidion satellites Bates, 1884
- Bembidion satoi Morita, 1993
- Bembidion saturatum Casey, 1918
- Bembidion sauteri (Jedlicka, 1954)
- Bembidion saxatile Gyllenhal, 1827
- Bembidion scandens Landin, 1955
- Bembidion scapulare Dejean, 1831
- Bembidion scelio (Antoine, 1945)
- Bembidion scenicum Casey, 1918
- Bembidion schermanni Kirschenhofer, 1985
- Bembidion schillhammeri Toledano, 1998
- Bembidion schmidti Wollaston, 1854
- Bembidion schnitteri Neri & Toledano, 2017
- Bembidion schoedli Toledano, 2005
- Bembidion schoenmanni Toledano, 2000
- Bembidion schuelkei Toledano, 2000
- Bembidion schueppelii Dejean, 1831
- Bembidion sciakyi Toledano, 1999
- Bembidion scintillans Bates, 1882
- Bembidion scitulum Erichson, 1834
- Bembidion sclanoi (Magrini, 1996)
- Bembidion scopulinum (Kirby, 1837)
- Bembidion scotti Netolitzky, 1931
- Bembidion scottustulatum Netolitzky, 1937
- Bembidion scudderi LeConte, 1878
- Bembidion sculpturatum (Motschulsky, 1859)
- Bembidion scythicum K.Daniel, 1902
- Bembidion seijii Toledano, 2009
- Bembidion sejunctum Casey, 1918
- Bembidion semenovi Lindroth, 1965
- Bembidion semibraccatum Netolitzky, 1911
- Bembidion semicinctum Notman, 1919
- Bembidion semifasciatum Say, 1830
- Bembidion semilotum Netolitzky, 1911
- Bembidion semilunium Netolitzky, 1914
- Bembidion seminskiense Shilenkov, 1990
- Bembidion semiopacum Casey, 1924
- Bembidion semipunctatum (Donovan, 1806)
- Bembidion semistriatum (Haldeman, 1843)
- Bembidion sengleti Toledano & Marggi, 2007
- Bembidion seriatum (Motschulsky, 1844)
- Bembidion serpentinum Landin, 1955
- Bembidion servillei Solier, 1849
- Bembidion seticorne Lindroth, 1980
- Bembidion sexfoveatum Germain, 1906
- Bembidion shepherdae Maddison, 2020
- Bembidion shibatai Morita, 2008
- Bembidion shikokuense (Morita, 1996)
- Bembidion shilenkovi Morita, 1989
- Bembidion shimoyamai Habu, 1978
- Bembidion shugela Toledano, 2000
- Bembidion shunichii Habu, 1973
- Bembidion sibiricum Dejean, 1831
- Bembidion siculum Dejean, 1831
- Bembidion sierricola Casey, 1924
- Bembidion signatipenne du Val, 1852
- Bembidion sillemi Netolitzky, 1935
- Bembidion silvicola (Jeannel, 1962)
- Bembidion simplex Hayward, 1897
- Bembidion sinicum Andrewes, 1938
- Bembidion sinuosum Schmidt & Marggi, 2014
- Bembidion sirinae Moret & Toledano, 2002
- Bembidion siticum Casey, 1918
- Bembidion sjolanderi Jedlicka, 1965
- Bembidion sjostedti Alluaud, 1927
- Bembidion skoraszewskyi Korge, 1971
- Bembidion smaragdinum (Sharp, 1903)
- Bembidion smetanai Toledano & Schmidt, 2008
- Bembidion smirnovi Kryzhanovskij, 1979
- Bembidion soederbomi Jedlicka, 1965
- Bembidion sogdianum Belousov & Mikhailov, 1990
- Bembidion sokolowskii Fassati, 1957
- Bembidion solanum Jedlicka, 1965
- Bembidion solieri Gemminger & Harold, 1868
- Bembidion solitarium Lindroth, 1976
- Bembidion solskyi Netolitzky, 1934
- Bembidion sordidum (Kirby, 1837)
- Bembidion sparsum Bates, 1882
- Bembidion speciense Jedlicka, 1932
- Bembidion sphaeroderum Bates, 1882
- Bembidion sphaeruliferum Bates, 1891
- Bembidion spinolai Solier, 1849
- Bembidion splendens Andrewes, 1923
- Bembidion splendidum Sturm, 1825
- Bembidion spretum Dejean, 1831
- Bembidion spurcum Blackburn, 1881
- Bembidion staneki Maran, 1932
- Bembidion starkii Schaum, 1860
- Bembidion steinbuehleri Ganglbauer, 1891
- Bembidion steini Netolitzky, 1914
- Bembidion stenoderum Bates, 1873
- Bembidion stephensii Crotch, 1866
- Bembidion sterbai Jedlicka, 1965
- Bembidion stewartense Lindroth, 1976
- Bembidion stillaguamish Hatch, 1950
- Bembidion stolfai G.Müller, 1943
- Bembidion storkianum Müller-Motzfeld, 1988
- Bembidion straussi Netolitzky, 1910
- Bembidion striaticeps Andrewes, 1935
- Bembidion striatum (Fabricius, 1792)
- Bembidion stricticolle Germain, 1906
- Bembidion strictum (Schuler, 1962)
- Bembidion striola (LeConte, 1852)
- Bembidion subaerarium Casey, 1924
- Bembidion subangustatum Hayward, 1897
- Bembidion subapterum Darlington, 1934
- Bembidion subcostatum (Motschulsky, 1850)
- Bembidion subcylindricum Reitter, 1892
- Bembidion subfasciatum Chaudoir, 1850
- Bembidion subflavescens (Antoine, 1945)
- Bembidion subfusum Darlington, 1959
- Bembidion subimpressum Kirschenhofer, 1989
- Bembidion sublimbatum Wollaston, 1877
- Bembidion submaculatum Bates, 1878
- Bembidion submutatum Netolitzky, 1911
- Bembidion suensoni Kirschenhofer, 1984
- Bembidion sulcicolle J.Sahlberg, 1880
- Bembidion sulcipenne J.Sahlberg, 1880
- Bembidion sulfurarium Moret & Toledano, 2002
- Bembidion sumaoi Morita, 1981
- Bembidion suturale Motschulsky, 1850
- Bembidion syropalaestinum (Bonavita & Taglianti, 2010)

=== T ===
- Bembidion tabellatum Wollaston, 1854
- Bembidion taguense Toledano, 2000
- Bembidion tahitiense Liebherr & Maddison, 2013
- Bembidion tairuense Bates, 1878
- Bembidion taiwanum Netolitzky, 1939
- Bembidion taiyuanense Kirschenhofer, 1984
- Bembidion takasagonis Habu, 1973
- Bembidion tambra Andrewes, 1923
- Bembidion tauricum G.Müller, 1918
- Bembidion tekapoense Broun, 1886
- Bembidion tencenti Hatch, 1951
- Bembidion tenellum Erichson, 1837
- Bembidion tepaki Larochelle & Larivière, 2015
- Bembidion teradai Toledano, 2009
- Bembidion teres Blackburn, 1881
- Bembidion tergluense Netolitzky, 1918
- Bembidion terminale Heer, 1841
- Bembidion terryerwini Neri & Toledano, 2021
- Bembidion tesselatum Brullé, 1843
- Bembidion testaceum (Duftschmid, 1812)
- Bembidion testatum Casey, 1918
- Bembidion tethys Netolitzky, 1926
- Bembidion tetracolum Say, 1823
- Bembidion tetragrammum Chaudoir, 1846
- Bembidion tetrapholeon Maddison, 2014
- Bembidion tetraporum Bates, 1883
- Bembidion tetrasemum Chaudoir, 1846
- Bembidion texanum Chaudoir, 1868
- Bembidion tibiale (Duftschmid, 1812)
- Bembidion tigrinum LeConte, 1879
- Bembidion tillyardi (Brookes, 1927)
- Bembidion timidum (LeConte, 1847)
- Bembidion tinctum Zetterstedt, 1828
- Bembidion tokunoshimanum (Nakane, 1956)
- Bembidion tolbonuri Müller-Motzfeld, 1984
- Bembidion toledanoi Schmidt, 2004
- Bembidion toledanoianum Echaroux, 2008
- Bembidion topali (Nègre, 1973)
- Bembidion torosum Marggi & C.Huber, 1999
- Bembidion toubkalense Bonavita & Taglianti, 2018
- Bembidion townsendi Lindroth, 1976
- Bembidion toyodai Morita, 2009
- Bembidion trabzonicum Belousov & Sokolov, 1994
- Bembidion transcaucasicum Lutshnik, 1938
- Bembidion transhimalayanum Schmidt, 2018
- Bembidion transparens (Gebler, 1830)
- Bembidion transsylvanicum Bielz, 1852
- Bembidion transversale Dejean, 1831
- Bembidion transversum G.Müller, 1918
- Bembidion trebinjense Apfelbeck, 1899
- Bembidion trechiforme (LeConte, 1852)
- Bembidion trechoides Wollaston, 1877
- Bembidion tricuspis Neri & Toledano, 2018
- Bembidion triviale Casey, 1918
- Bembidion tropicale (Bruneau de Miré, 1952)
- Bembidion tropicum Chaudoir, 1876
- Bembidion tsutsuii (Ueno, 1954)
- Bembidion tucumanum (Jeannel, 1962)
- Bembidion tunuyanense Jensen-Haarup, 1910
- Bembidion turcicum Gemminger & Harold, 1868
- Bembidion turnai Toledano, 1998
- Bembidion turquinum Darlington, 1937

=== U ===
- Bembidion uenoianum (Morita, 1996)
- Bembidion ugartei Toledano, 2002
- Bembidion uhligi Toledano & Maddison, 2016
- Bembidion ulkei Lindroth, 1963
- Bembidion umbratum (LeConte, 1847)
- Bembidion umeyai Habu, 1959
- Bembidion umi Sasakawa, 2007
- Bembidion umiatense Lindroth, 1963
- Bembidion unifasciatum (de Saludo, 1970)
- Bembidion uniforme Csiki, 1928
- Bembidion urarteum Neri & Toledano, 2017
- Bembidion urewerense Lindroth, 1976
- Bembidion uruguayense Csiki, 1928
- Bembidion ustum (Quensel, 1806)

=== V ===
- Bembidion vaillanti (Schuler, 1956)
- Bembidion validum Netolitzky, 1920
- Bembidion vandykei Blaisdell, 1902
- Bembidion varicolor (Fabricius, 1803)
- Bembidion variegatum Say, 1823
- Bembidion variola Netolitzky, 1910
- Bembidion variolatum Mikhailov, 1983
- Bembidion varium (Olivier, 1795)
- Bembidion velox (Linnaeus, 1760)
- Bembidion veneriatum (Normand, 1946)
- Bembidion vernale Bates, 1882
- Bembidion versicolor (LeConte, 1847)
- Bembidion versutum LeConte, 1878
- Bembidion vespertinum Casey, 1918
- Bembidion viator Casey, 1918
- Bembidion vicinum Lucas, 1846
- Bembidion viduum Netolitzky, 1910
- Bembidion vignai Moret & Toledano, 2002
- Bembidion vile (LeConte, 1852)
- Bembidion villagomesi Moret & Toledano, 2002
- Bembidion virens Gyllenhal, 1827
- Bembidion viridicolle (LaFerté-Sénectère, 1841)
- Bembidion vitalisi Andrewes, 1921
- Bembidion vitiosum Gemminger & Harold, 1868
- Bembidion vividum Casey, 1884
- Bembidion vodozi Sainte-Claire Deville, 1906
- Bembidion vseteckai Maran, 1936
- Bembidion vulcanium Darlington, 1934
- Bembidion vulcanix Sproul & Maddison, 2018
- Bembidion vulpecula Casey, 1918

=== W ===
- Bembidion waialeale Liebherr, 2008
- Bembidion waiho Larochelle & Larivière, 2015
- Bembidion waimarama Larochelle & Larivière, 2015
- Bembidion walterrossii Toledano, 2008
- Bembidion wanakense Lindroth, 1976
- Bembidion wardii Toledano, 2008
- Bembidion watanabei Morita, 2003
- Bembidion waziristanum Andrewes, 1932
- Bembidion weiratherianum Netolitzky, 1932
- Bembidion whymperi Moret & Toledano, 2002
- Bembidion wickhami Hayward, 1897
- Bembidion wittmeri (Basilewsky, 1979)
- Bembidion wolfgangi Toledano, 2008
- Bembidion wraseanum Toledano, 1998
- Bembidion wrzecionkoi Toledano & Schmidt, 2008
- Bembidion wui Toledano & Terada, 2014
- Bembidion wutaishanense Kirschenhofer, 1984

=== X Y Z ===
- Bembidion xanthacrum Chaudoir, 1850
- Bembidion xanthocerum Bates, 1883
- Bembidion xanthochiton Andrewes, 1922
- Bembidion xanthoxanthum Netolitzky, 1939
- Bembidion xestum Andrewes, 1923
- Bembidion yakushimanum Sasakawa, 2007
- Bembidion yamtso Schmidt, 2018
- Bembidion yasudai Morita, 2019
- Bembidion yatsuense Morita, 2009
- Bembidion yehi Toledano & Terada, 2014
- Bembidion yokohamae (Bates, 1883)
- Bembidion yoshidai Morita, 2009
- Bembidion yoshikawai (Morita, 1996)
- Bembidion youngi Moret & Toledano, 2002
- Bembidion yuae Toledano, 2008
- Bembidion yukonum Fall, 1926
- Bembidion yunnanum Andrewes, 1923
- Bembidion zagrosense (Morvan, 1972)
- Bembidion zaitzevi Lutshnik, 1938
- Bembidion zanettii Toledano, 2008
- Bembidion zephyrum Fall, 1910
- Bembidion zierisi Toledano, 2008
- Bembidion zlotini Mikhailov, 1996
- Bembidion zolotarewi Reitter, 1910
- Bembidion zugmayeri Schmidt, 2018

=== Extinct ===
- † Bembidion absolutum Giebel, 1856
- † Bembidion alekseevi Schmidt & Michalik, 2015
- † Bembidion bipunctatum Lomnicki, 1894
- † Bembidion boryslavicum Lomnicki, 1894
- † Bembidion bukejsi Schmidt & Michalik, 2015
- † Bembidion christelae Ortuño & Arillo, 2010
- † Bembidion cyaneomicans Piton, 1940
- † Bembidion damnosum Scudder, 1900
- † Bembidion davidae Pierce, 1944
- † Bembidion everestae Pierce, 1944
- † Bembidion exoletum Scudder, 1876
- † Bembidion expletum Scudder, 1900
- † Bembidion festivum Zhang; Sun & Zhang, 1994
- † Bembidion florissantense Wickham, 1913
- † Bembidion fragmentum Scudder, 1890
- † Bembidion glaciatum Scudder, 1890
- † Bembidion haywardi Scudder, 1900
- † Bembidion inferum Heer, 1856
- † Bembidion levigatum Forster, 1891
- † Bembidion obductum Scudder, 1900
- † Bembidion praeteritum Scudder, 1900
- † Bembidion saportanum Oustalet, 1874
- † Bembidion strenum Zhang; Liu & Shangguan, 2010
- † Bembidion subcontaminatum Lomnicki, 1894
- † Bembidion succini Giebel, 1856
- † Bembidion tumulorum Scudder, 1900
- † Bembidion vanum Scudder, 1900
- † Bembidion vestigium Scudder, 1900
