= Bembidion salebratum =

Scientific classification
- Kingdom: Animalia
- Phylum: Arthropoda
- Class: Insecta
- Order: Coleoptera
- Suborder: Adephaga
- Family: Carabidae
- Genus: Bembidion
- Species: B. salebratum

Binomial name
- Bembidion salebratum (LeConte, 1847)

Synonyms
- Ochthedromus purpurascens LeConte, 1847; Ochthedromus salebratus LeConte, 1847; Bembidion consessor Casey, 1918; Bembidion inopinum Casey, 1918; Bembidion mackinacensis Hatch, 1929

Species of beetle

Bembidion salebratum is a species of beetle in the family Carabidae. It is found in Canada and the United States.
