= Bembidion cheyennense =

Scientific classification
- Kingdom: Animalia
- Phylum: Arthropoda
- Class: Insecta
- Order: Coleoptera
- Suborder: Adephaga
- Family: Carabidae
- Genus: Bembidion
- Species: B. cheyennense

Binomial name
- Bembidion cheyennense Casey, 1918

Synonyms
- Bembidion sufflatum Casey, 1918; Bembidion nuperum Casey, 1918

Species of beetle

Bembidion cheyennense is a species of beetle in the family Carabidae. It is found in North America.
