= Bembidion sphaeroderum =

Scientific classification
- Kingdom: Animalia
- Phylum: Arthropoda
- Class: Insecta
- Order: Coleoptera
- Suborder: Adephaga
- Family: Carabidae
- Genus: Bembidion
- Species: B. sphaeroderum

Binomial name
- Bembidion sphaeroderum Bates, 1882

Synonyms
- Bembidion minax Casey, 1918; Bembidion occultum Casey, 1918

Species of beetle

Bembidion sphaeroderum is a species of ground beetle in the family Carabidae. It is found in North America.
