= Bembidion obscurellum =

Scientific classification
- Kingdom: Animalia
- Phylum: Arthropoda
- Class: Insecta
- Order: Coleoptera
- Suborder: Adephaga
- Family: Carabidae
- Genus: Bembidion
- Species: B. obscurellum

Binomial name
- Bembidion obscurellum (Motschulsky, 1845)

Species of beetle

Bembidion obscurellum is a species of ground beetle in the family Carabidae. It is found in Europe and Northern Asia (excluding China) and North America.

== Subspecies ==
These seven subspecies belong to the species Bembidion obscurellum:

- Bembidion obscurellum corporaali Netolitzky, 1935
- Bembidion obscurellum fumipenne Fassati, 1957
- Bembidion obscurellum insperatum Lutshnik, 1938
- Bembidion obscurellum obscurellum (Motschulsky, 1845)
- Bembidion obscurellum thibeticum Fassati, 1957
- Bembidion obscurellum turanicum Csiki, 1928
- Ocydromus obscurellus obscurellus (Motschulsky, 1844)
