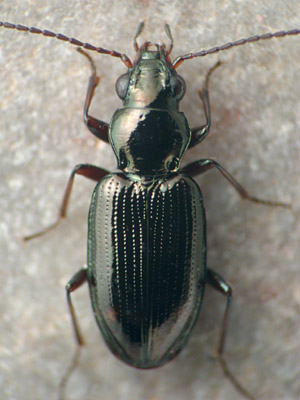

Scientific classification
- Kingdom: Animalia
- Phylum: Arthropoda
- Class: Insecta
- Order: Coleoptera
- Suborder: Adephaga
- Family: Carabidae
- Genus: Bembidion
- Species: B. aratum

Binomial name
- Bembidion aratum (LeConte, 1852)

Synonyms
- Bembidion definitum Casey, 1918; Bembidion vinnulum Casey, 1884

= Bembidion aratum =

Species of beetle

Bembidion aratum is a species of ground beetle in the family Carabidae. It is found in North America.
