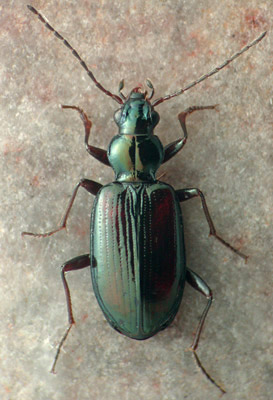

Scientific classification
- Kingdom: Animalia
- Phylum: Arthropoda
- Class: Insecta
- Order: Coleoptera
- Suborder: Adephaga
- Family: Carabidae
- Genus: Bembidion
- Species: B. mckinleyi

Binomial name
- Bembidion mckinleyi Fall, 1926

= Bembidion mckinleyi =

Species of beetle

Bembidion mckinleyi is a species of ground beetle in the family Carabidae. It is found in North America and Europe.

== Subspecies ==
These three subspecies belong to the species Bembidion mckinleyi:

- Bembidion mckinleyi carneum Lindroth, 1963
- Bembidion mckinleyi mckinleyi Fall, 1926
- Bembidion mckinleyi scandicum Lindroth, 1943
