= Bembidion compressum =

Scientific classification
- Kingdom: Animalia
- Phylum: Arthropoda
- Class: Insecta
- Order: Coleoptera
- Suborder: Adephaga
- Family: Carabidae
- Genus: Bembidion
- Species: B. compressum

Binomial name
- Bembidion compressum Lindroth, 1963

Species of beetle

Bembidion compressum is a species of ground beetle in the family Carabidae. It is found in Europe and Northern Asia (excluding China) and North America.
