= Bembidion pedicellatum =

Scientific classification
- Kingdom: Animalia
- Phylum: Arthropoda
- Clade: Pancrustacea
- Class: Insecta
- Order: Coleoptera
- Suborder: Adephaga
- Family: Carabidae
- Genus: Bembidion
- Species: B. pedicellatum

Binomial name
- Bembidion pedicellatum LeConte, 1857

Species of beetle

Bembidion pedicellatum is a species of ground beetle in the family Carabidae. It is found in North America. It is 2.7‒3.4 mm long. Its range is Pennsylvania, Minnesota, South Dakota, Tennessee and Texas.
