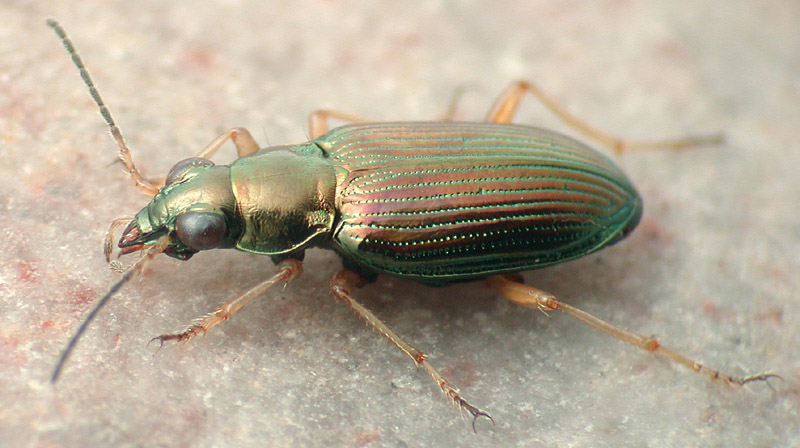

Scientific classification
- Kingdom: Animalia
- Phylum: Arthropoda
- Class: Insecta
- Order: Coleoptera
- Suborder: Adephaga
- Family: Carabidae
- Genus: Bembidion
- Species: B. confusum

Binomial name
- Bembidion confusum Hayward, 1897

= Bembidion confusum =

Species of beetle

Bembidion confusum is a species of ground beetle in the family Carabidae. It is found in North America.

== Subspecies ==
These three subspecies belong to the species Bembidion confusum:

- Bembidion confusum aeneorubrum Casey
- Bembidion confusum confusum
- Bembidion confusum marquettense Casey
