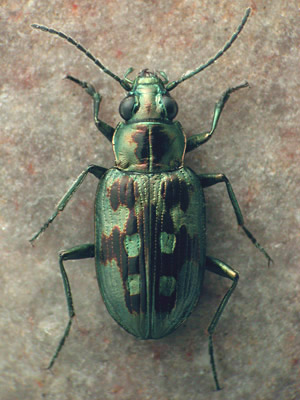

Scientific classification
- Kingdom: Animalia
- Phylum: Arthropoda
- Class: Insecta
- Order: Coleoptera
- Suborder: Adephaga
- Family: Carabidae
- Genus: Bembidion
- Species: B. zephyrum

Binomial name
- Bembidion zephyrum Fall, 1910

Synonyms
- Bembidion marginosum Casey, 1924

= Bembidion zephyrum =

Species of beetle

Bembidion zephyrum is a species of ground beetle found in British Columbia, Canada and California, Oregon and Washington of the United States.
