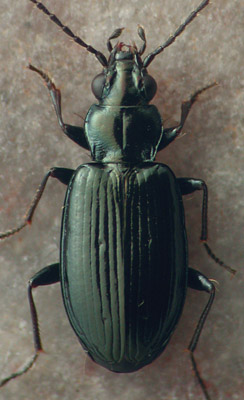

Scientific classification
- Kingdom: Animalia
- Phylum: Arthropoda
- Class: Insecta
- Order: Coleoptera
- Suborder: Adephaga
- Family: Carabidae
- Genus: Bembidion
- Species: B. carolinense

Binomial name
- Bembidion carolinense Casey, 1924

= Bembidion carolinense =

Species of beetle

Bembidion carolinense is a species of ground beetle in the family Carabidae. It is found in North America.
