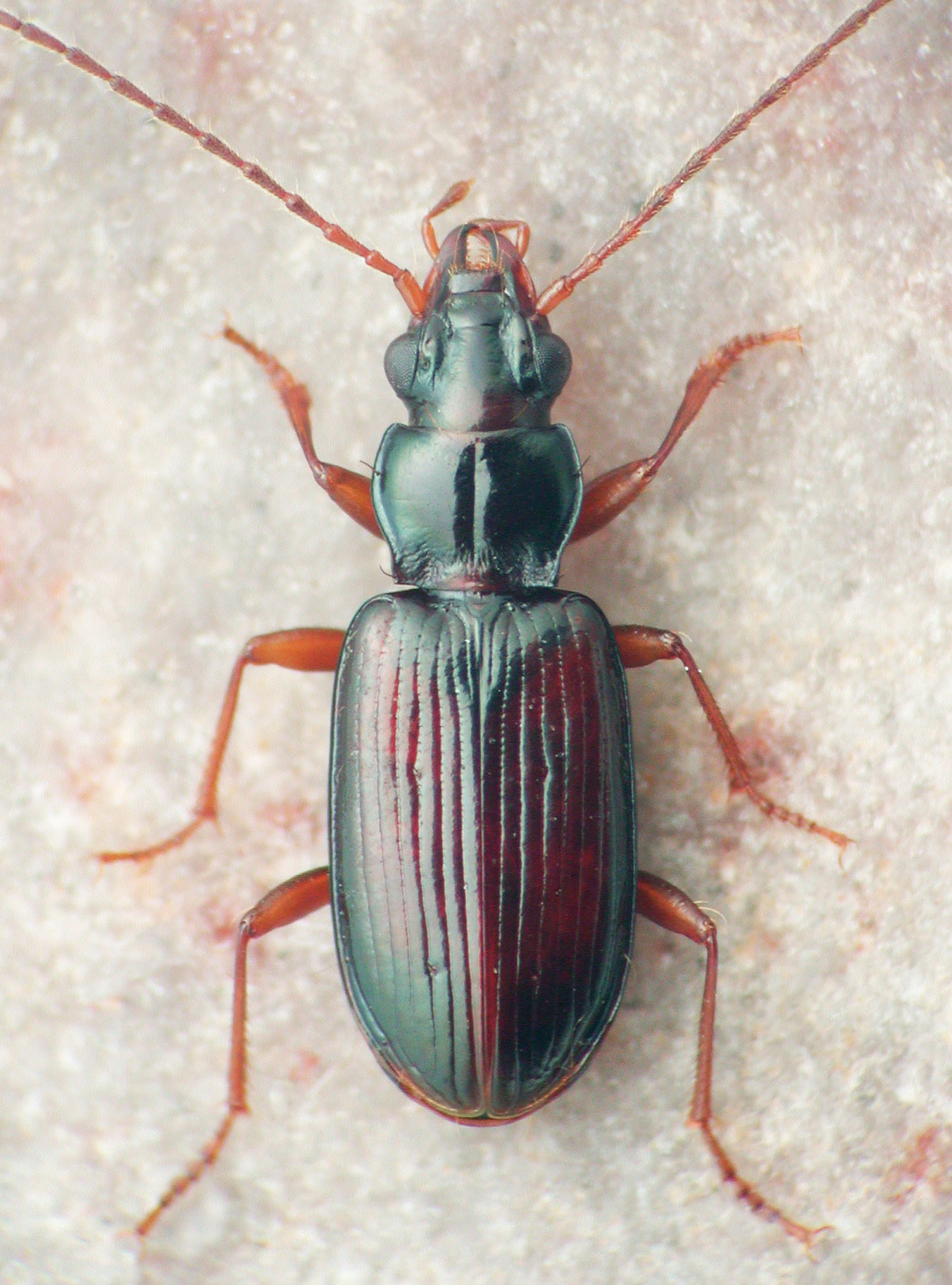

Scientific classification
- Kingdom: Animalia
- Phylum: Arthropoda
- Class: Insecta
- Order: Coleoptera
- Suborder: Adephaga
- Family: Carabidae
- Genus: Bembidion
- Species: B. rolandi

Binomial name
- Bembidion rolandi Fall, 1922

= Bembidion rolandi =

Species of beetle

Bembidion rolandi is a species of ground beetle in the subfamily Trechinae. It is found in Canada and the United States.
