= Bembidion sejunctum =

Scientific classification
- Kingdom: Animalia
- Phylum: Arthropoda
- Class: Insecta
- Order: Coleoptera
- Suborder: Adephaga
- Family: Carabidae
- Genus: Bembidion
- Species: B. sejunctum

Binomial name
- Bembidion sejunctum Casey, 1918

Species of beetle

Bembidion sejunctum is a species of beetle in the family Carabidae. It is found on Saint Pierre and Miquelon and Magdalen Islands as well as in Canada and the United States.

== Subspecies ==
These two subspecies belong to the species Bembidion sejunctum.

- Bembidion sejunctum sejunctum Casey, 1918
- Bembidion sejunctum semiaureum Fall, 1922
