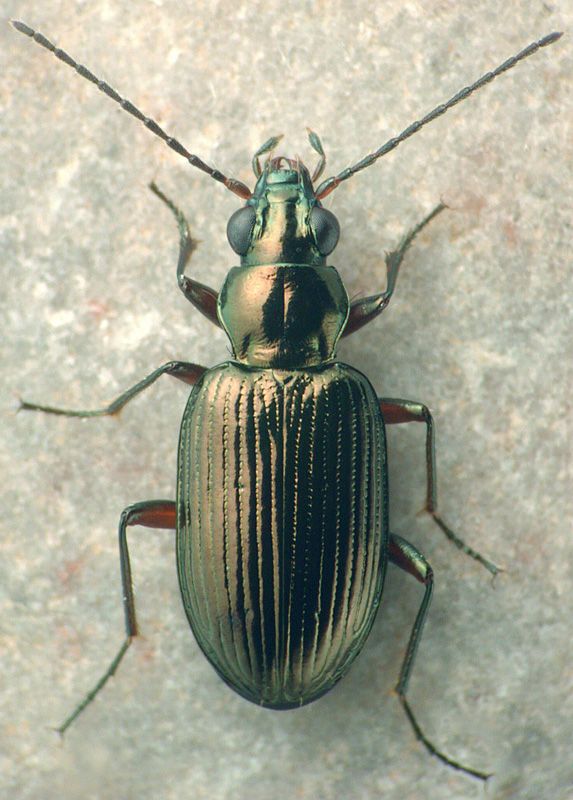

Scientific classification
- Kingdom: Animalia
- Phylum: Arthropoda
- Class: Insecta
- Order: Coleoptera
- Suborder: Adephaga
- Family: Carabidae
- Genus: Bembidion
- Species: B. chalceum

Binomial name
- Bembidion chalceum Dejean, 1831

= Bembidion chalceum =

Species of beetle

Bembidion chalceum is a species of ground beetle in the family Carabidae. It is found in North America.
