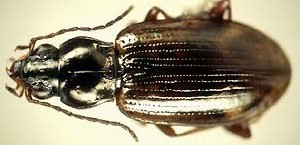

Scientific classification
- Kingdom: Animalia
- Phylum: Arthropoda
- Class: Insecta
- Order: Coleoptera
- Suborder: Adephaga
- Family: Carabidae
- Genus: Bembidion
- Species: B. incrematum

Binomial name
- Bembidion incrematum LeConte, 1860

= Bembidion incrematum =

Species of beetle

Bembidion incrematum is a species of ground beetle in the family Carabidae. It is found in North America.
