= Bembidion quadrulum =

Scientific classification
- Kingdom: Animalia
- Phylum: Arthropoda
- Class: Insecta
- Order: Coleoptera
- Suborder: Adephaga
- Family: Carabidae
- Genus: Bembidion
- Species: B. quadrulum

Binomial name
- Bembidion quadrulum Leconte, 1861

Synonyms
- Bembidion aegrotum Casey, 1918; Bembidion callidum Casey, 1918; Bembidion tritum Casey, 1918

Species of beetle

Bembidion quadrulum is a species of ground beetle in the family Carabidae. It is found in North America.
