= Bembidion connivens =

Scientific classification
- Kingdom: Animalia
- Phylum: Arthropoda
- Class: Insecta
- Order: Coleoptera
- Suborder: Adephaga
- Family: Carabidae
- Genus: Bembidion
- Species: B. connivens

Binomial name
- Bembidion connivens (LeConte, 1852)

Species of beetle

Bembidion connivens is a species of ground beetle in the family Carabidae. It is found in North America.
