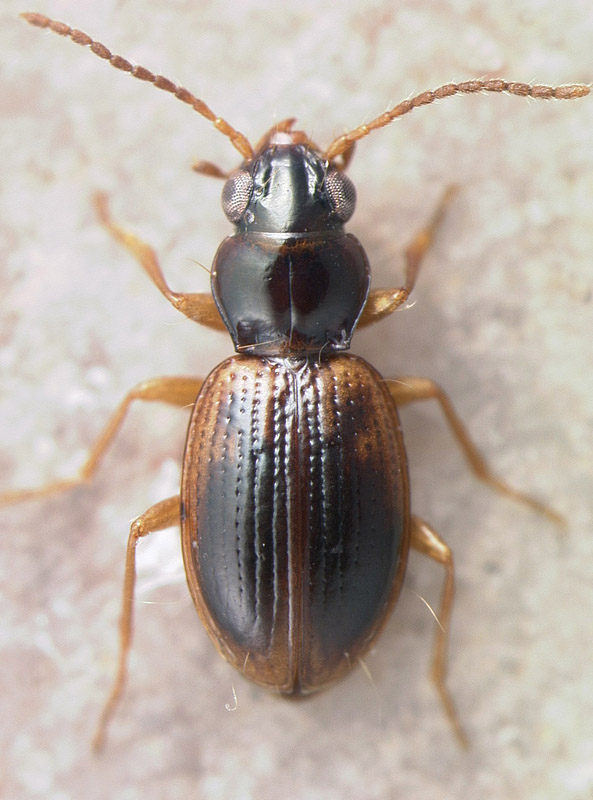

Scientific classification
- Domain: Eukaryota
- Kingdom: Animalia
- Phylum: Arthropoda
- Class: Insecta
- Order: Coleoptera
- Suborder: Adephaga
- Family: Carabidae
- Genus: Bembidion
- Species: B. semicinctum

Binomial name
- Bembidion semicinctum Notman, 1919

= Bembidion semicinctum =

Species of beetle

Bembidion semicinctum is a species of ground beetle in the family Carabidae ("ground beetles"), in the suborder Adephaga ("ground and water beetles"). It was described by American entomologist Howard Notman in 1919.

It is found in northeastern North America.

Bembidion semicinctum is distinguished from other similar species by its elytra coloring, with an "ill-defined pale reddish area" at the base and along the shoulders.
