= Bembidion debiliceps =

Scientific classification
- Kingdom: Animalia
- Phylum: Arthropoda
- Class: Insecta
- Order: Coleoptera
- Suborder: Adephaga
- Family: Carabidae
- Genus: Bembidion
- Species: B. debiliceps

Binomial name
- Bembidion debiliceps Casey, 1918

Species of beetle

Bembidion debiliceps is a species of beetle in the family Carabidae. It is found in British Columbia, Canada and in both Oregon and Washington states.
