= Bembidion paraenulum =

Scientific classification
- Kingdom: Animalia
- Phylum: Arthropoda
- Class: Insecta
- Order: Coleoptera
- Suborder: Adephaga
- Family: Carabidae
- Genus: Bembidion
- Species: B. paraenulum

Binomial name
- Bembidion paraenulum Maddison, 2009

Species of beetle

Bembidion paraenulum is a species of ground beetle in the family Carabidae. It is found in North America.
