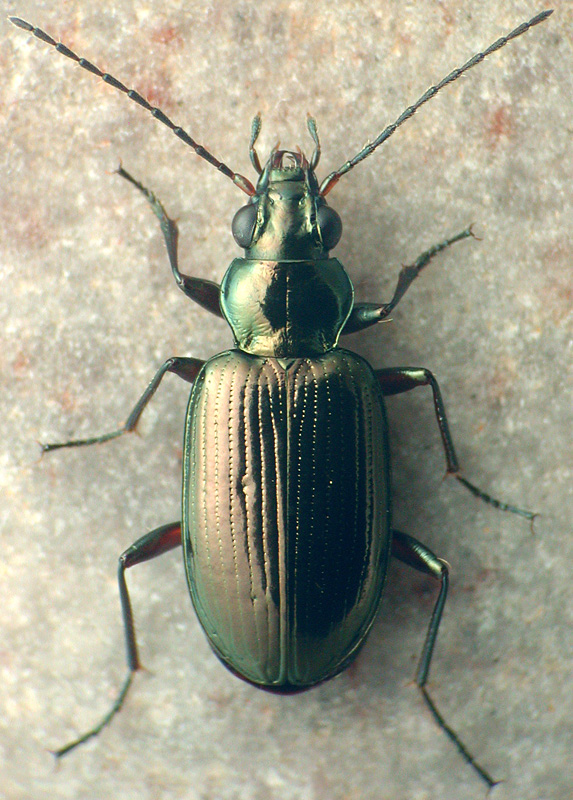

Scientific classification
- Kingdom: Animalia
- Phylum: Arthropoda
- Class: Insecta
- Order: Coleoptera
- Suborder: Adephaga
- Family: Carabidae
- Genus: Bembidion
- Species: B. louisella

Binomial name
- Bembidion louisella Maddison, 2008

= Bembidion louisella =

Species of beetle

Bembidion louisella is a species of ground beetle in the family Carabidae. It is found in North America.
