= Bembidion yukonum =

Scientific classification
- Kingdom: Animalia
- Phylum: Arthropoda
- Class: Insecta
- Order: Coleoptera
- Suborder: Adephaga
- Family: Carabidae
- Genus: Bembidion
- Species: B. yukonum

Binomial name
- Bembidion yukonum Fall, 1926

Species of beetle

Bembidion yukonum is a species of ground beetle in the subfamily Trechinae. It is found in Finland, Norway, Russia, Sweden, Canada and the U.S. state of Alaska. Its habitat includes cracks, river banks and clayish soils. It feeds on birch trees.
