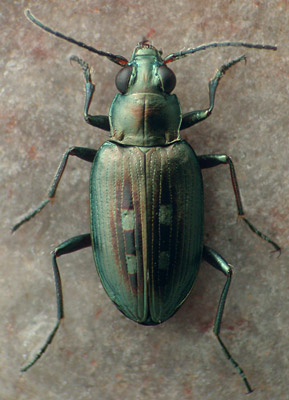

Scientific classification
- Kingdom: Animalia
- Phylum: Arthropoda
- Class: Insecta
- Order: Coleoptera
- Suborder: Adephaga
- Family: Carabidae
- Genus: Bembidion
- Species: B. lapponicum

Binomial name
- Bembidion lapponicum Zetterstedt, 1828

= Bembidion lapponicum =

Species of beetle

Bembidion lapponicum is a species of ground beetle in the family Carabidae. It is found in Europe and Northern Asia (excluding China) and North America.
