= Bembidion lugubre =

Scientific classification
- Kingdom: Animalia
- Phylum: Arthropoda
- Class: Insecta
- Order: Coleoptera
- Suborder: Adephaga
- Family: Carabidae
- Genus: Bembidion
- Species: B. lugubre

Binomial name
- Bembidion lugubre LeConte, 1857

Synonyms
- Bembidion retectum Casey, 1918

Species of beetle

Bembidion lugubre is a species of ground beetle in the family Carabidae.
