= Bembidion contractum =

Scientific classification
- Kingdom: Animalia
- Phylum: Arthropoda
- Clade: Pancrustacea
- Class: Insecta
- Order: Coleoptera
- Suborder: Adephaga
- Family: Carabidae
- Genus: Bembidion
- Species: B. contractum

Binomial name
- Bembidion contractum Say, 1823

Species of beetle

Bembidion contractum is a species of ground beetle in the family Carabidae. It is found along the Atlantic coast of North America, from Newfoundland (Canada) to southern Florida (USA). Inland records require confirmation.
