= Bembidion mexicanum =

Scientific classification
- Kingdom: Animalia
- Phylum: Arthropoda
- Class: Insecta
- Order: Coleoptera
- Suborder: Adephaga
- Family: Carabidae
- Genus: Bembidion
- Species: B. mexicanum

Binomial name
- Bembidion mexicanum Dejean, 1831

Synonyms
- Bembidion badipenne Casey, 1918; Bembidion canonicum Casey, 1918

Species of beetle

Bembidion mexicanum is a species of ground beetle in the family Carabidae. It is found in North America.
