= Bembidion adygorum =

Scientific classification
- Domain: Eukaryota
- Kingdom: Animalia
- Phylum: Arthropoda
- Class: Insecta
- Order: Coleoptera
- Suborder: Adephaga
- Family: Carabidae
- Genus: Bembidion
- Species: B. adygorum

Binomial name
- Bembidion adygorum Belousov & Sokolov, 1996

Species of beetle

Bembidion adygorum is a species of ground beetle from the Trechinae subfamily that can be found in Armenia, Georgia and Caucasus.
