= Bembidion graphicum =

Scientific classification
- Kingdom: Animalia
- Phylum: Arthropoda
- Class: Insecta
- Order: Coleoptera
- Suborder: Adephaga
- Family: Carabidae
- Genus: Bembidion
- Species: B. graphicum

Binomial name
- Bembidion graphicum Casey, 1918

Synonyms
- Bembidion lassulum Casey, 1918; Bembidion scrutatum Casey, 1918

Species of beetle

Bembidion graphicum is a species of ground beetle in the family Carabidae. It is found in North America.
