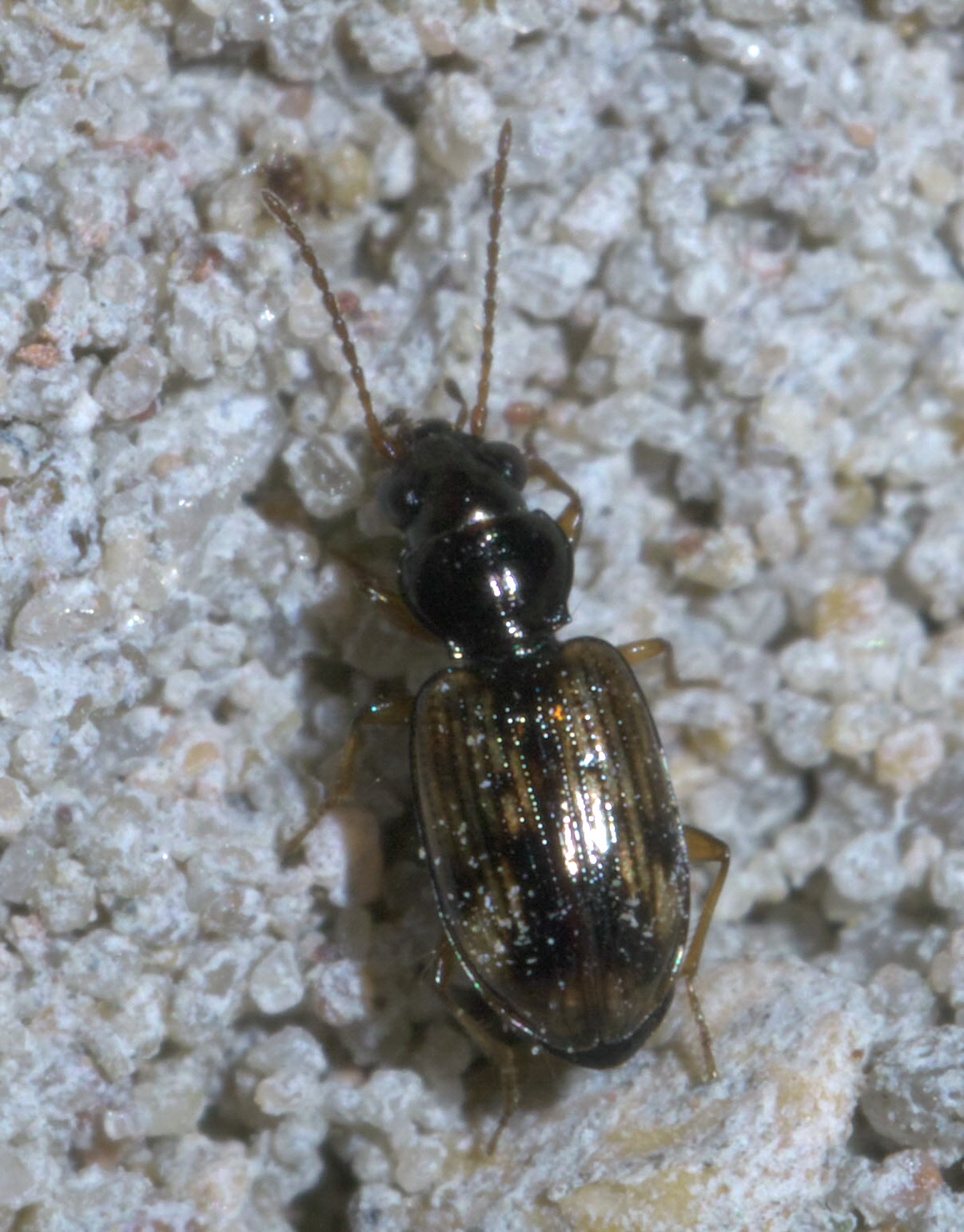

Scientific classification
- Kingdom: Animalia
- Phylum: Arthropoda
- Class: Insecta
- Order: Coleoptera
- Suborder: Adephaga
- Family: Carabidae
- Genus: Bembidion
- Species: B. impotens

Binomial name
- Bembidion impotens Casey, 1918

Synonyms
- Bembidion frugale Casey, 1918; Bembidion gratuitum Casey, 1918; Bembidion imbelle Casey, 1918; Bembidion virgatulum Casey, 1918

= Bembidion impotens =

Species of beetle

Bembidion impotens is a species of ground beetle in the family Carabidae. It is found in North America.

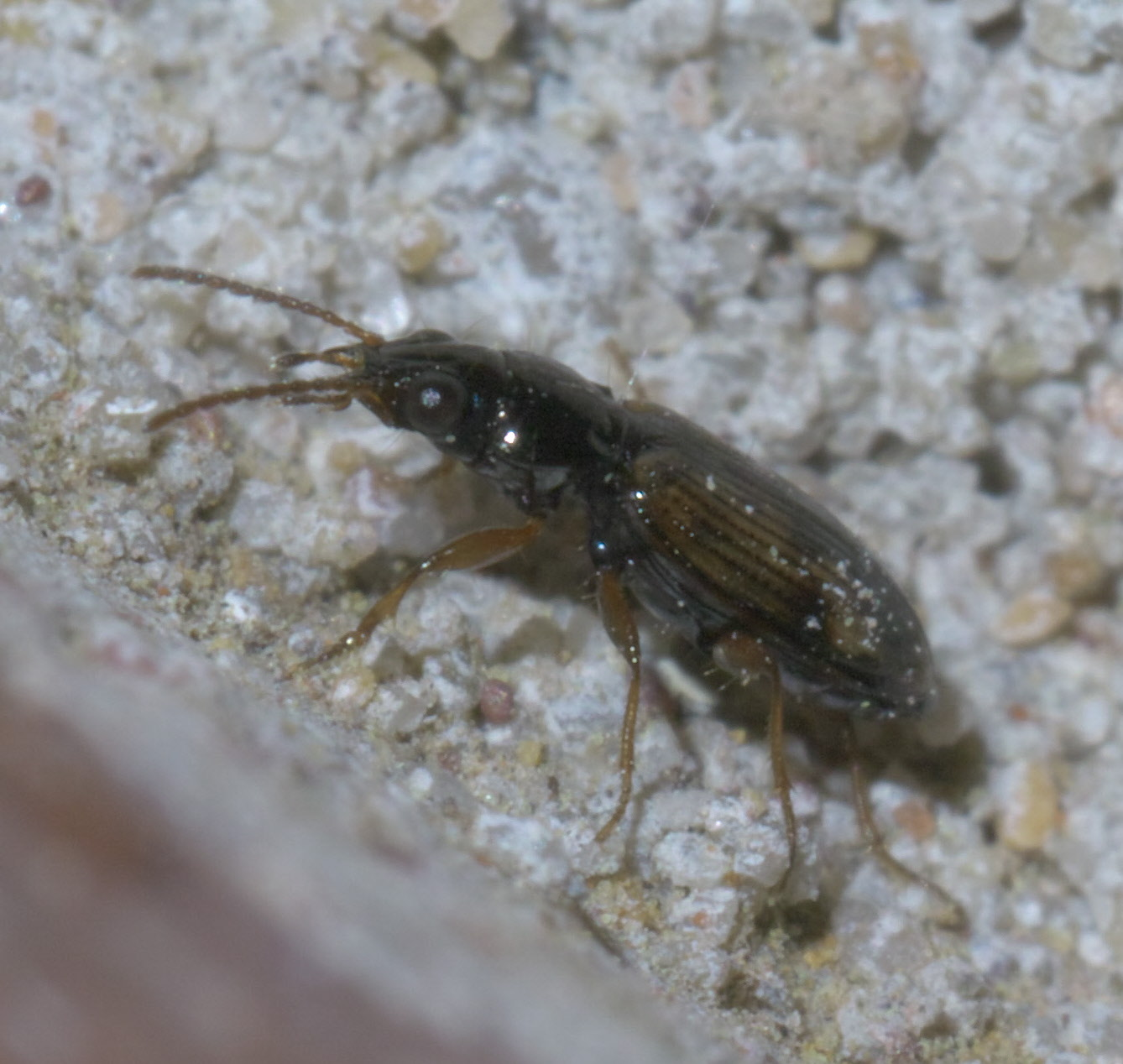
