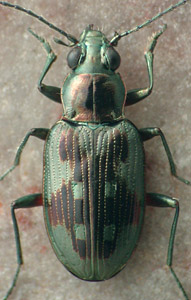

Scientific classification
- Kingdom: Animalia
- Phylum: Arthropoda
- Class: Insecta
- Order: Coleoptera
- Suborder: Adephaga
- Family: Carabidae
- Genus: Bembidion
- Species: B. levettei

Binomial name
- Bembidion levettei Casey, 1918

= Bembidion levettei =

Species of beetle

Bembidion levettei is a species of ground beetle in the family Carabidae. It is found in North America.

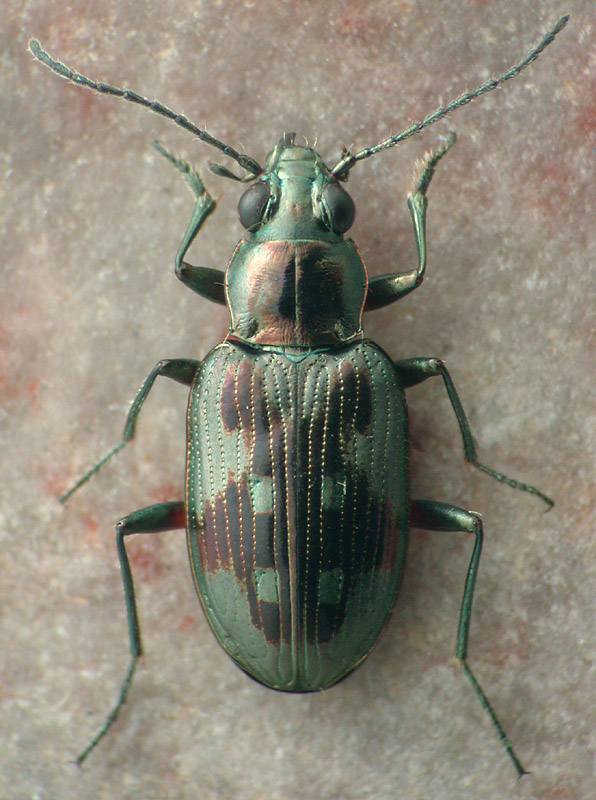

== Subspecies ==
These two subspecies belong to the species Bembidion levettei:

- Bembidion levettei carrianum Casey, 1924
- Bembidion levettei levettei Casey, 1918
