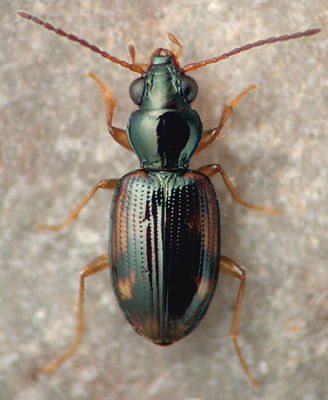

Scientific classification
- Kingdom: Animalia
- Phylum: Arthropoda
- Class: Insecta
- Order: Coleoptera
- Suborder: Adephaga
- Family: Carabidae
- Genus: Bembidion
- Species: B. affine

Binomial name
- Bembidion affine Say, 1823

= Bembidion affine =

Species of beetle

Bembidion affine is a species of ground beetle in the subfamily Trechinae. It is found in North America, from Ontario and southwestern Quebec in Canada to the Florida Panhandle and Texas in the United States. It also occurs in Cuba.

Bembidion affine measure 2.9–3.5 mm (0.11–0.14 in).
