= Bembidion dyschirinum =

Scientific classification
- Kingdom: Animalia
- Phylum: Arthropoda
- Class: Insecta
- Order: Coleoptera
- Suborder: Adephaga
- Family: Carabidae
- Genus: Bembidion
- Species: B. dyschirinum

Binomial name
- Bembidion dyschirinum Leconte, 1861

Species of beetle

Bembidion dyschirinum is a species of ground beetle in the family Carabidae, found in North America.
