= Haliplus furcatus =

Scientific classification
- Kingdom: Animalia
- Phylum: Arthropoda
- Clade: Pancrustacea
- Class: Insecta
- Order: Coleoptera
- Suborder: Adephaga
- Family: Haliplidae
- Genus: Haliplus
- Species: H. furcatus

Binomial name
- Haliplus furcatus Seidlitz, 1887

Species of beetle

Haliplus furcatus is a species of water beetle from Haliplidae, family that can be found in Central Europe (except Switzerland) and Northwestern Europe (except for Faroe Islands, Iceland, and Ireland).
