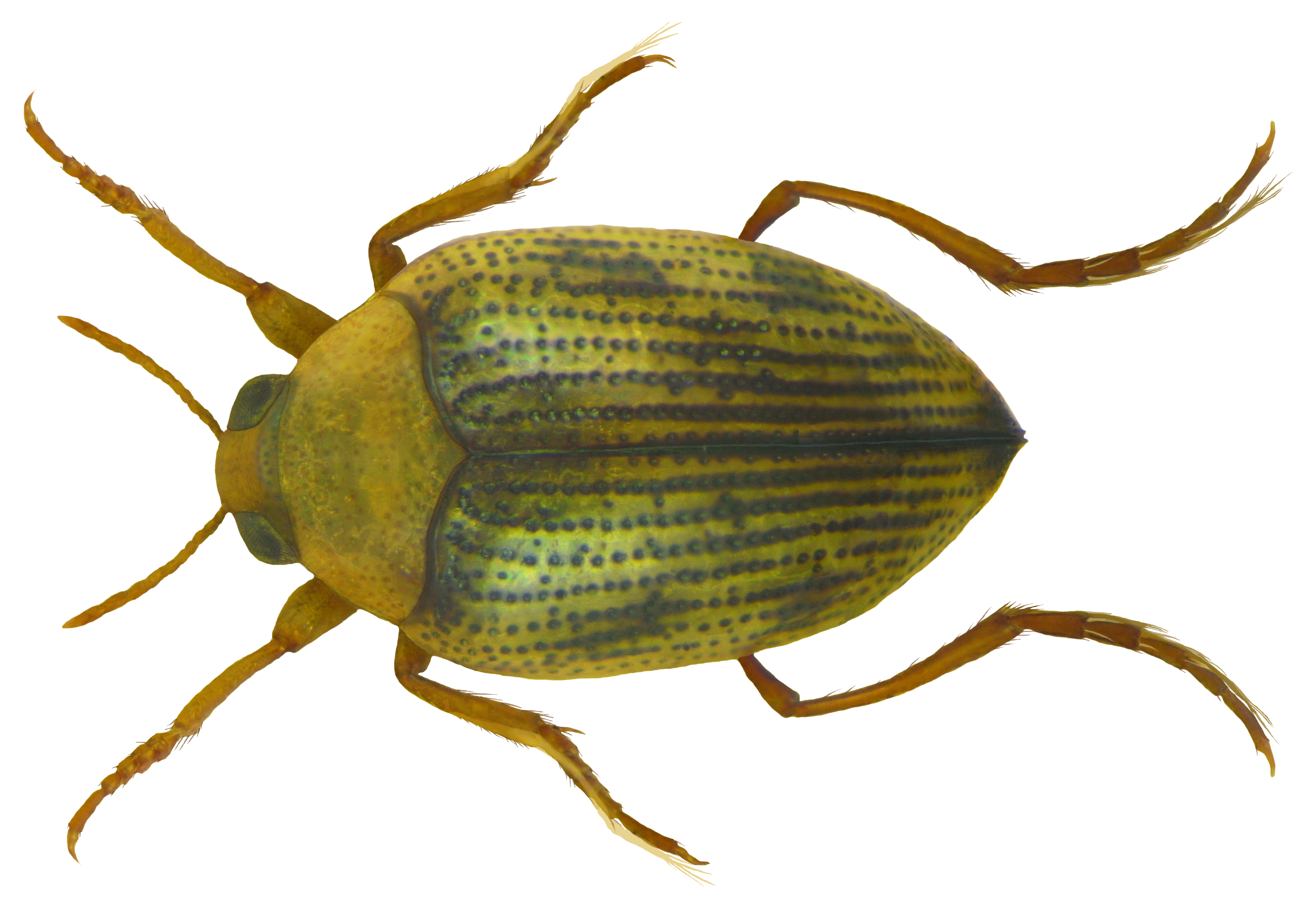

Scientific classification
- Kingdom: Animalia
- Phylum: Arthropoda
- Clade: Pancrustacea
- Class: Insecta
- Order: Coleoptera
- Suborder: Adephaga
- Family: Haliplidae
- Genus: Haliplus
- Species: H. ruficollis

Binomial name
- Haliplus ruficollis (De Geer, 1774)

Synonyms
- Dytiscus ruficollis De Geer, 1774

= Haliplus ruficollis =

Species of beetle

Haliplus ruficollis is a species of water beetle from the Haliplidae family that can be found everywhere in Europe, the Near East and the East Palaearctic, but is absent in Albania and all European islands except for Corsica.
