= Haliplus aliae =

Scientific classification
- Kingdom: Animalia
- Phylum: Arthropoda
- Clade: Pancrustacea
- Class: Insecta
- Order: Coleoptera
- Suborder: Adephaga
- Family: Haliplidae
- Genus: Haliplus
- Species: H. aliae

Binomial name
- Haliplus aliae Vondel, 2003

Species of beetle

Haliplus aliae is a species of water beetle in the genus Haliplus. It can be found in the Palearctic.
