= Haliplus sibiricus =

Scientific classification
- Kingdom: Animalia
- Phylum: Arthropoda
- Clade: Pancrustacea
- Class: Insecta
- Order: Coleoptera
- Suborder: Adephaga
- Family: Haliplidae
- Genus: Haliplus
- Species: H. sibiricus

Binomial name
- Haliplus sibiricus Motschulsky, 1860

Synonyms
- Haliplus lindbergi Falkenstrom, 1939; Haliplus sahlbergi Falkenstrom, 1939

Species of beetle

Haliplus sibiricus is a species of water beetle from Haliplidae family that can be found in Finland, Norway, Sweden, Latvia, and northern Russia.
