= Bembidion nigropiceum =

Scientific classification
- Domain: Eukaryota
- Kingdom: Animalia
- Phylum: Arthropoda
- Class: Insecta
- Order: Coleoptera
- Suborder: Adephaga
- Family: Carabidae
- Genus: Bembidion
- Species: B. nigropiceum

Binomial name
- Bembidion nigropiceum Marsham, 1802

Synonyms
- Bembidion puritanum

Species of beetle

Bembidion nigropiceum is a small, fast-moving water beetle in the Trechinae subfamily.

== Description ==
The species is black coloured and have a length of 7.5 millimetres (0.30 in). The distinctive feature of this kind of species is that it doesn't have metallic sheen. They are closely related to Bembidion laticeps.

== Distribution ==
The species can be found in Kent, Pembrokeshire and from Cornwall to the northern part of Suffolk in England and Wales. It can also be found in Mediterranean coast and near the English Channel. The species were introduced to Massachusetts in the late 1800s by ships that were coming to the New World.

== Ecology ==
The species emerge in spring, following by larval stage in summer, and hibernation in winter. They can be seen from March to June. Both larva and adults are considered to be predators, because they hunt for small insects.

== Habitat ==
They can be found on shingle and sand beaches, or in a rubble between the cracks of the coastal cliffs.

== Threat status ==
The species is considered to be Nationally Scarce in Great Britain.

== Conservation ==
Due to its decline in Great Britain the species therefore are protected by UK Biodiversity Action Plan. The decline happen to be from habitat loss which is due to the invasion of Himalayan Balsam and floods.
