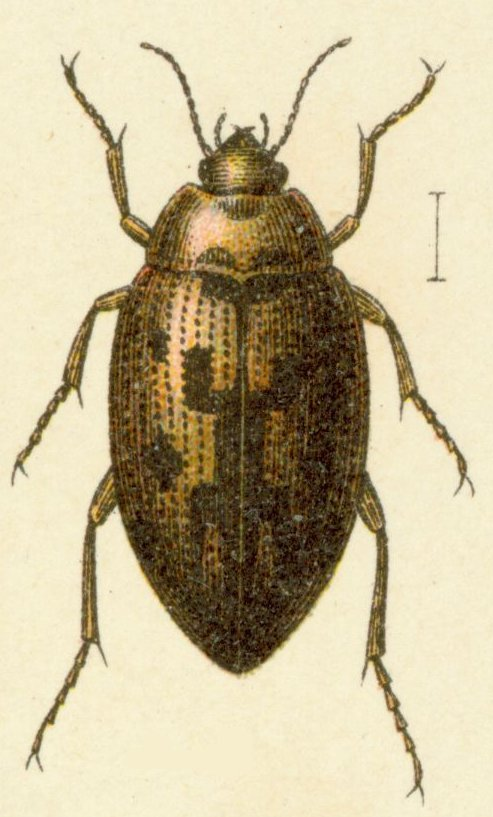

Scientific classification
- Kingdom: Animalia
- Phylum: Arthropoda
- Clade: Pancrustacea
- Class: Insecta
- Order: Coleoptera
- Suborder: Adephaga
- Family: Haliplidae
- Genus: Haliplus
- Species: H. variegatus

Binomial name
- Haliplus variegatus Sturm, 1834

= Haliplus variegatus =

Species of beetle

Haliplus variegatus is a Palearctic species of water beetle in the Haliplidae family. It has been found in Belgium and England.
