= Haliplus africanus =

Scientific classification
- Kingdom: Animalia
- Phylum: Arthropoda
- Clade: Pancrustacea
- Class: Insecta
- Order: Coleoptera
- Suborder: Adephaga
- Family: Haliplidae
- Genus: Haliplus
- Species: H. africanus

Binomial name
- Haliplus africanus Aubé, 1838

Species of beetle

Haliplus africanus is a species of water beetle in the Haliplidae family. It was discovered by Charles Nicholas Aubé in 1838.
