= Haliplus apicalis =

Scientific classification
- Kingdom: Animalia
- Phylum: Arthropoda
- Clade: Pancrustacea
- Class: Insecta
- Order: Coleoptera
- Suborder: Adephaga
- Family: Haliplidae
- Genus: Haliplus
- Species: H. apicalis

Binomial name
- Haliplus apicalis (Thomson, 1868)

Species of beetle

Haliplus apicalis is a species of water beetle in the genus Haliplus. It can be found on British Isles and in North-West Europe.
