= Haliplus salmo =

Scientific classification
- Kingdom: Animalia
- Phylum: Arthropoda
- Clade: Pancrustacea
- Class: Insecta
- Order: Coleoptera
- Suborder: Adephaga
- Family: Haliplidae
- Genus: Haliplus
- Species: H. salmo

Binomial name
- Haliplus salmo Wallis, 1933

Species of beetle

Haliplus salmo is a species of crawling water beetle in the family Haliplidae.
