= Madaglymbus unguicularis =

Scientific classification
- Kingdom: Animalia
- Phylum: Arthropoda
- Class: Insecta
- Order: Coleoptera
- Suborder: Adephaga
- Family: Dytiscidae
- Genus: Madaglymbus
- Species: M. unguicularis

Binomial name
- Madaglymbus unguicularis (Régimbart, 1903)

Species of beetle

Madaglymbus unguicularis is a species of diving beetle. It is part of the subfamily Copelatinae of the family Dytiscidae. It was described by Régimbart in 1903.
