= Brychius glabratus =

Scientific classification
- Kingdom: Animalia
- Phylum: Arthropoda
- Class: Insecta
- Order: Coleoptera
- Suborder: Adephaga
- Family: Haliplidae
- Genus: Brychius
- Species: B. glabratus

Binomial name
- Brychius glabratus Villa & Villa, 1835

Species of beetle

Brychius glabratus is a species of beetle in the genus Brychius, discovered by two Villa siblings in 1835.
