= Haliplus canadensis =

Scientific classification
- Kingdom: Animalia
- Phylum: Arthropoda
- Clade: Pancrustacea
- Class: Insecta
- Order: Coleoptera
- Suborder: Adephaga
- Family: Haliplidae
- Genus: Haliplus
- Species: H. canadensis

Binomial name
- Haliplus canadensis Wallis, 1933

Species of beetle

Haliplus canadensis is a species of water beetle in the genus Haliplus. The species was described by Wallis in 1933.
