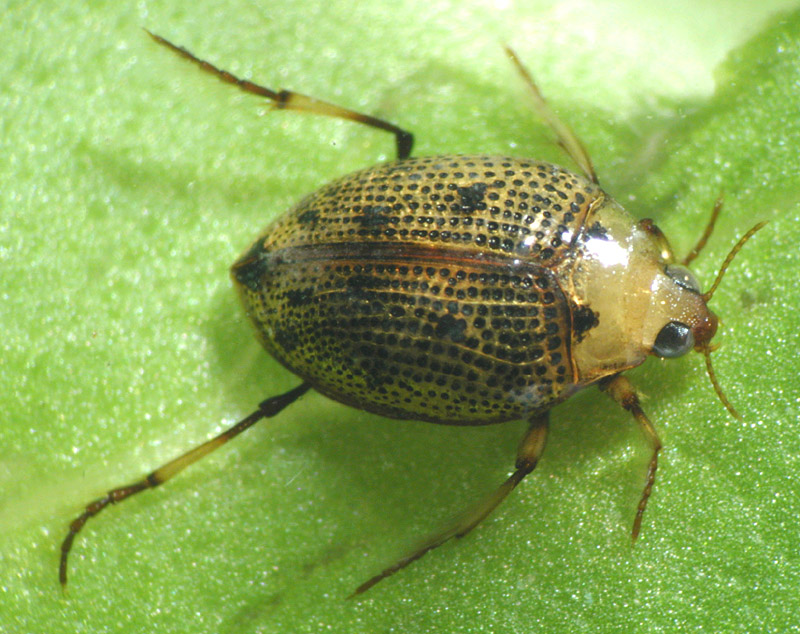
- Peltodytes dispersus

Scientific classification
- Kingdom: Animalia
- Phylum: Arthropoda
- Class: Insecta
- Order: Coleoptera
- Suborder: Adephaga
- Family: Haliplidae
- Genus: Peltodytes; Régimbart, 1878

= Peltodytes =

Genus of beetles

Peltodytes is a genus of water beetle which is native to the Nearctic, Europe, the Near East, and North Africa. Peltodytes can generally be differentiated from the similar Haliplus by the presence of a pair of spots on the posterior margin of the pronotum. The genus Peltodytes contains the following species:

- Peltodytes alluaudi Guignot, 1936
- Peltodytes bradleyi Young, 1961
- Peltodytes caesus (Duftschmid, 1805)
- Peltodytes callosus (LeConte, 1852)
- Peltodytes congoensis Zimmermann, 1924
- Peltodytes coomani Peschet, 1923
- Peltodytes darlingtoni Young, 1961
- Peltodytes dauricus Zimmermann, 1924
- Peltodytes dietrichi Young, 1961
- Peltodytes dispersus Roberts, 1913
- Peltodytes dunavani Young, 1961
- Peltodytes duodecimpunctatus (Say, 1823)
- Peltodytes edentulus (LeConte, 1863)
- Peltodytes festivus (Wehncke, 1876)
- Peltodytes floridensis Matheson, 1912
- Peltodytes intermedius (Sharp, 1873)
- Peltodytes lengi Roberts, 1913
- Peltodytes litoralis Matheson, 1912
- Peltodytes mexicanus (Wehncke, 1883)
- Peltodytes muticus (LeConte, 1863)
- Peltodytes nodieri Guignot, 1936
- Peltodytes oppositus Roberts, 1913
- Peltodytes ovalis Zimmermann, 1924
- Peltodytes pedunculatus (Blatchley, 1910)
- Peltodytes pekinensis Vondel, 1992
- Peltodytes quadratus Régimbart, 1895
- Peltodytes rotundatus (Aubé, 1836)
- Peltodytes sexmaculatus Roberts, 1913
- Peltodytes shermani Roberts, 1913
- Peltodytes simplex (LeConte, 1852)
- Peltodytes sinensis (Hope, 1845)
- Peltodytes speratus Régimbart, 1906
- Peltodytes sumatrensis Régimbart, 1885
- Peltodytes tamaulipensis Young, 1964
- Peltodytes tortulosus Roberts, 1913
