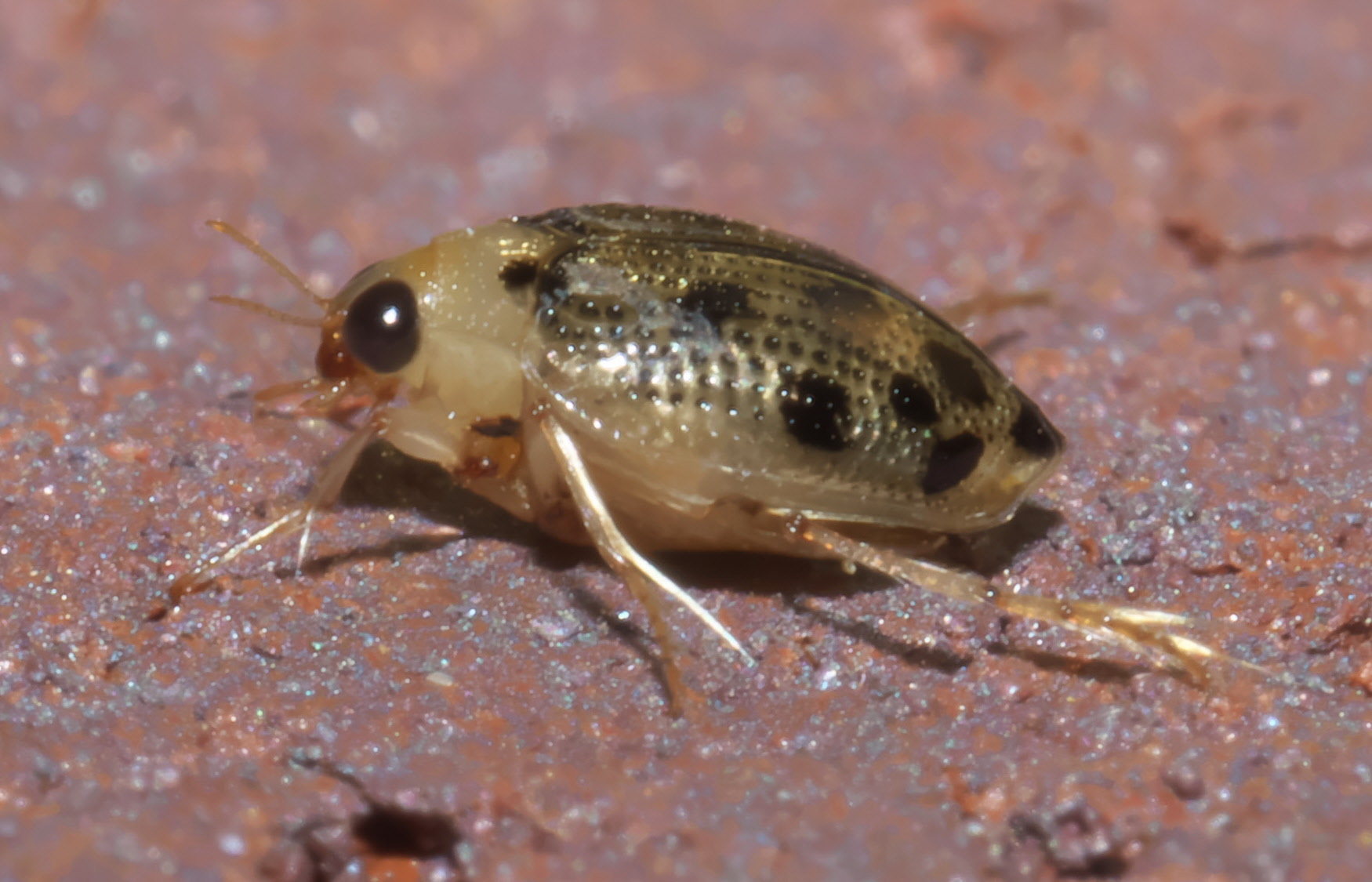

Scientific classification
- Domain: Eukaryota
- Kingdom: Animalia
- Phylum: Arthropoda
- Class: Insecta
- Order: Coleoptera
- Suborder: Adephaga
- Family: Haliplidae
- Genus: Peltodytes
- Species: P. litoralis

Binomial name
- Peltodytes litoralis Matheson, 1912

= Peltodytes litoralis =

Species of beetle

Peltodytes litoralis is a species of beetle in the genus Peltodytes described in 1912.
