= Haliplus leopardus =

Scientific classification
- Kingdom: Animalia
- Phylum: Arthropoda
- Clade: Pancrustacea
- Class: Insecta
- Order: Coleoptera
- Suborder: Adephaga
- Family: Haliplidae
- Genus: Haliplus
- Species: H. leopardus

Binomial name
- Haliplus leopardus Roberts, 1913

Species of beetle

Haliplus leopardus is a species of crawling water beetle in the family Haliplidae. It is found in North America.
