= Liopterus atriceps =

Scientific classification
- Kingdom: Animalia
- Phylum: Arthropoda
- Class: Insecta
- Order: Coleoptera
- Suborder: Adephaga
- Family: Dytiscidae
- Genus: Liopterus
- Species: L. atriceps

Binomial name
- Liopterus atriceps (Sharp, 1882)

Species of beetle

Liopterus atriceps is a species of water beetle in the genus Liopterus.
