= Haliplus alluaudi =

Scientific classification
- Kingdom: Animalia
- Phylum: Arthropoda
- Clade: Pancrustacea
- Class: Insecta
- Order: Coleoptera
- Suborder: Adephaga
- Family: Haliplidae
- Genus: Haliplus
- Species: H. alluaudi

Binomial name
- Haliplus alluaudi Régimbart, 1903

Species of beetle

Haliplus alluaudi is a species of Haliplidae in the genus Haliplus. It was discovered in 1903. The species lives in the Afro-tropical region.
