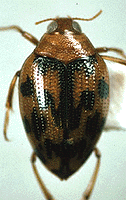

Scientific classification
- Kingdom: Animalia
- Phylum: Arthropoda
- Clade: Pancrustacea
- Class: Insecta
- Order: Coleoptera
- Suborder: Adephaga
- Family: Haliplidae
- Genus: Haliplus
- Species: H. fasciatus

Binomial name
- Haliplus fasciatus Aubé, 1838

= Haliplus fasciatus =

Species of beetle

Haliplus fasciatus is a species of crawling water beetle in the family Haliplidae. It is found in North America.
