= Brychius hornii =

Scientific classification
- Kingdom: Animalia
- Phylum: Arthropoda
- Class: Insecta
- Order: Coleoptera
- Suborder: Adephaga
- Family: Haliplidae
- Genus: Brychius
- Species: B. hornii

Binomial name
- Brychius hornii Crotch, 1873

Species of beetle

Brychius hornii is a species of beetle in the genus Brychius that was first described by George Robert Crotch in 1873.

It is native to western North America and is found in small streams and irrigation ditches, with adults primarily found on gravel substrate.
