= Haliplus concolor =

Scientific classification
- Kingdom: Animalia
- Phylum: Arthropoda
- Clade: Pancrustacea
- Class: Insecta
- Order: Coleoptera
- Suborder: Adephaga
- Family: Haliplidae
- Genus: Haliplus
- Species: H. concolor

Binomial name
- Haliplus concolor LeConte, 1852

Species of beetle

Haliplus concolor is a species of beetle in the genus Haliplus. It was first described by John Lawrence LeConte in 1852.
