= Haliplus camposi =

Scientific classification
- Kingdom: Animalia
- Phylum: Arthropoda
- Clade: Pancrustacea
- Class: Insecta
- Order: Coleoptera
- Suborder: Adephaga
- Family: Haliplidae
- Genus: Haliplus
- Species: H. camposi

Binomial name
- Haliplus camposi Guignot, 1948

Species of water beetle

Haliplus camposi is a species of Haliplidae in the genus Haliplus. It was discovered in 1948.
