= Haliplus carinatus =

Scientific classification
- Kingdom: Animalia
- Phylum: Arthropoda
- Clade: Pancrustacea
- Class: Insecta
- Order: Coleoptera
- Suborder: Adephaga
- Family: Haliplidae
- Genus: Haliplus
- Species: H. carinatus

Binomial name
- Haliplus carinatus Guignot, 1936

Species of beetle

Haliplus carinatus is a species of adephagan beetle in the genus Haliplus. It was described in 1936.
