= Madaglymbus apicalis =

Scientific classification
- Kingdom: Animalia
- Phylum: Arthropoda
- Class: Insecta
- Order: Coleoptera
- Suborder: Adephaga
- Family: Dytiscidae
- Genus: Madaglymbus
- Species: M. apicalis

Binomial name
- Madaglymbus apicalis (Fairmaire, 1898)

Species of beetle

Madaglymbus apicalis is a species of diving beetle. It is part of the genus Madaglymbus in the subfamily Copelatinae of the family Dytiscidae. It was described by Fairmaire in 1898. Madaglymbus apicalis is distributed along the coastlines of much of Africa.
