= Brychius pacificus =

Scientific classification
- Kingdom: Animalia
- Phylum: Arthropoda
- Class: Insecta
- Order: Coleoptera
- Suborder: Adephaga
- Family: Haliplidae
- Genus: Brychius
- Species: B. pacificus

Binomial name
- Brychius pacificus Carr, 1928

Species of beetle

Brychius pacificus is a species of beetle in the genus Brychius that was discovered in 1928.
