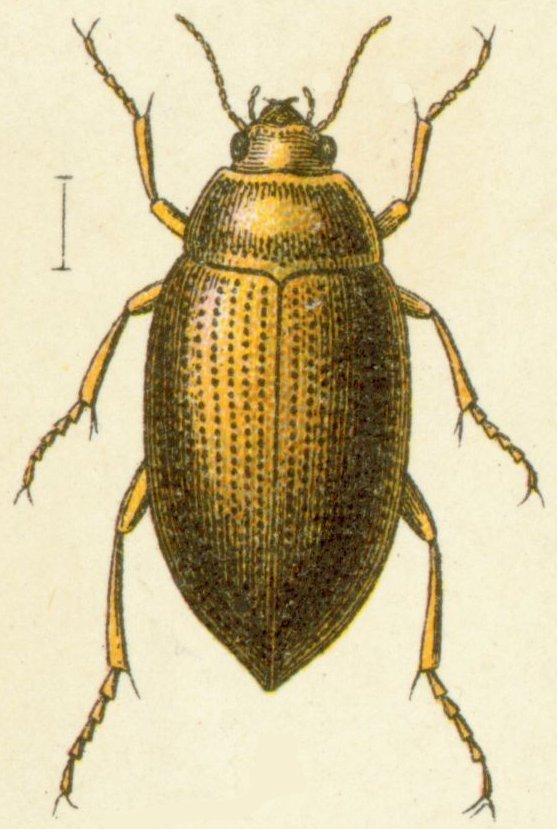
- Haliplus mucronatus

Scientific classification
- Kingdom: Animalia
- Phylum: Arthropoda
- Clade: Pancrustacea
- Class: Insecta
- Order: Coleoptera
- Suborder: Adephaga
- Family: Haliplidae
- Genus: Haliplus
- Species: H. mucronatus

Binomial name
- Haliplus mucronatus Stephens, 1821

= Haliplus mucronatus =

Species of beetle

Haliplus mucronatus is a species of Haliplidae in the genus Haliplus. It was discovered by Stephens in 1828.
