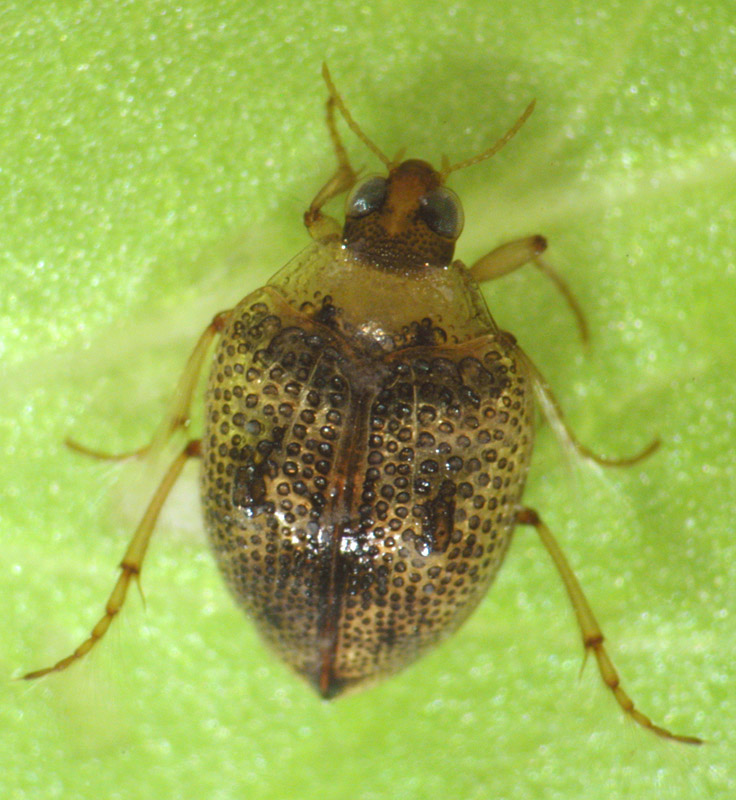

Scientific classification
- Domain: Eukaryota
- Kingdom: Animalia
- Phylum: Arthropoda
- Class: Insecta
- Order: Coleoptera
- Suborder: Adephaga
- Family: Haliplidae
- Genus: Peltodytes
- Species: P. callosus

Binomial name
- Peltodytes callosus (Leconte, 1852)

= Peltodytes callosus =

Species of beetle

Peltodytes callosus is a species of crawling water beetle in the family Haliplidae. It is found in North America.
