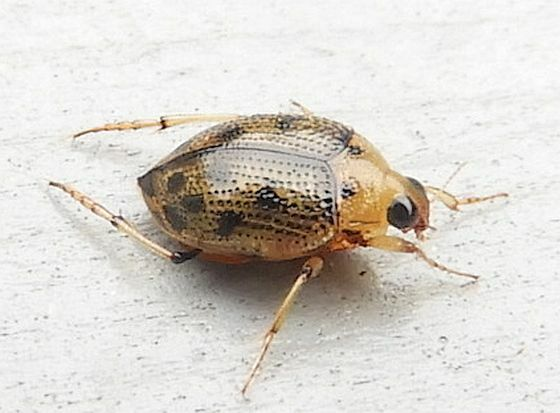

Scientific classification
- Domain: Eukaryota
- Kingdom: Animalia
- Phylum: Arthropoda
- Class: Insecta
- Order: Coleoptera
- Suborder: Adephaga
- Family: Haliplidae
- Genus: Peltodytes
- Species: P. sexmaculatus

Binomial name
- Peltodytes sexmaculatus Roberts, 1913

= Peltodytes sexmaculatus =

Species of beetle

Peltodytes sexmaculatus is a species of crawling water beetle in the family Haliplidae.
