= Exocelina subjecta =

Scientific classification
- Kingdom: Animalia
- Phylum: Arthropoda
- Class: Insecta
- Order: Coleoptera
- Suborder: Adephaga
- Family: Dytiscidae
- Genus: Exocelina
- Species: E. subjecta

Binomial name
- Exocelina subjecta Sharp, 1882

Synonyms
- Copelatus bilunatus Guignot, 1955

Species of beetle

Exocelina subjecta is a species of diving beetle in the genus Exocelina of the subfamily Copelatinae in the family Dytiscidae, described by David Sharp in 1882.
