= Exocelina cheesmanae =

Scientific classification
- Domain: Eukaryota
- Kingdom: Animalia
- Phylum: Arthropoda
- Class: Insecta
- Order: Coleoptera
- Suborder: Adephaga
- Family: Dytiscidae
- Genus: Exocelina
- Species: E. cheesmanae

Binomial name
- Exocelina cheesmanae (J. Balfour-Browne, 1939)

Synonyms
- Copelatus cheesmanae J.Balfour-Browne, 1939

Species of beetle

Exocelina cheesmanae is a species of diving beetle. It is part of the genus Exocelina in the subfamily Copelatinae of the family Dytiscidae. It was described by J. Balfour-Browne in 1939.
