= Peltodytes shermani =

Scientific classification
- Domain: Eukaryota
- Kingdom: Animalia
- Phylum: Arthropoda
- Class: Insecta
- Order: Coleoptera
- Suborder: Adephaga
- Family: Haliplidae
- Genus: Peltodytes
- Species: P. shermani

Binomial name
- Peltodytes shermani Roberts, 1913

Species of beetle

Peltodytes shermani is a species of crawling water beetle in the family Haliplidae.
