= Haliplus crassus =

Scientific classification
- Kingdom: Animalia
- Phylum: Arthropoda
- Clade: Pancrustacea
- Class: Insecta
- Order: Coleoptera
- Suborder: Adephaga
- Family: Haliplidae
- Genus: Haliplus
- Species: H. crassus

Binomial name
- Haliplus crassus Chapin, 1930

Species of beetle

Haliplus crassus is a species of beetle in the Haliplidae family that can be found in Brazil, Panama, Paraguay, and Venezuela. It flies from May to October. Adults are as long as 3.7–4.2 millimetres (0.15–0.17 in) while its larvae are 2.1–2.5 millimetres (0.083–0.098 in) long.
