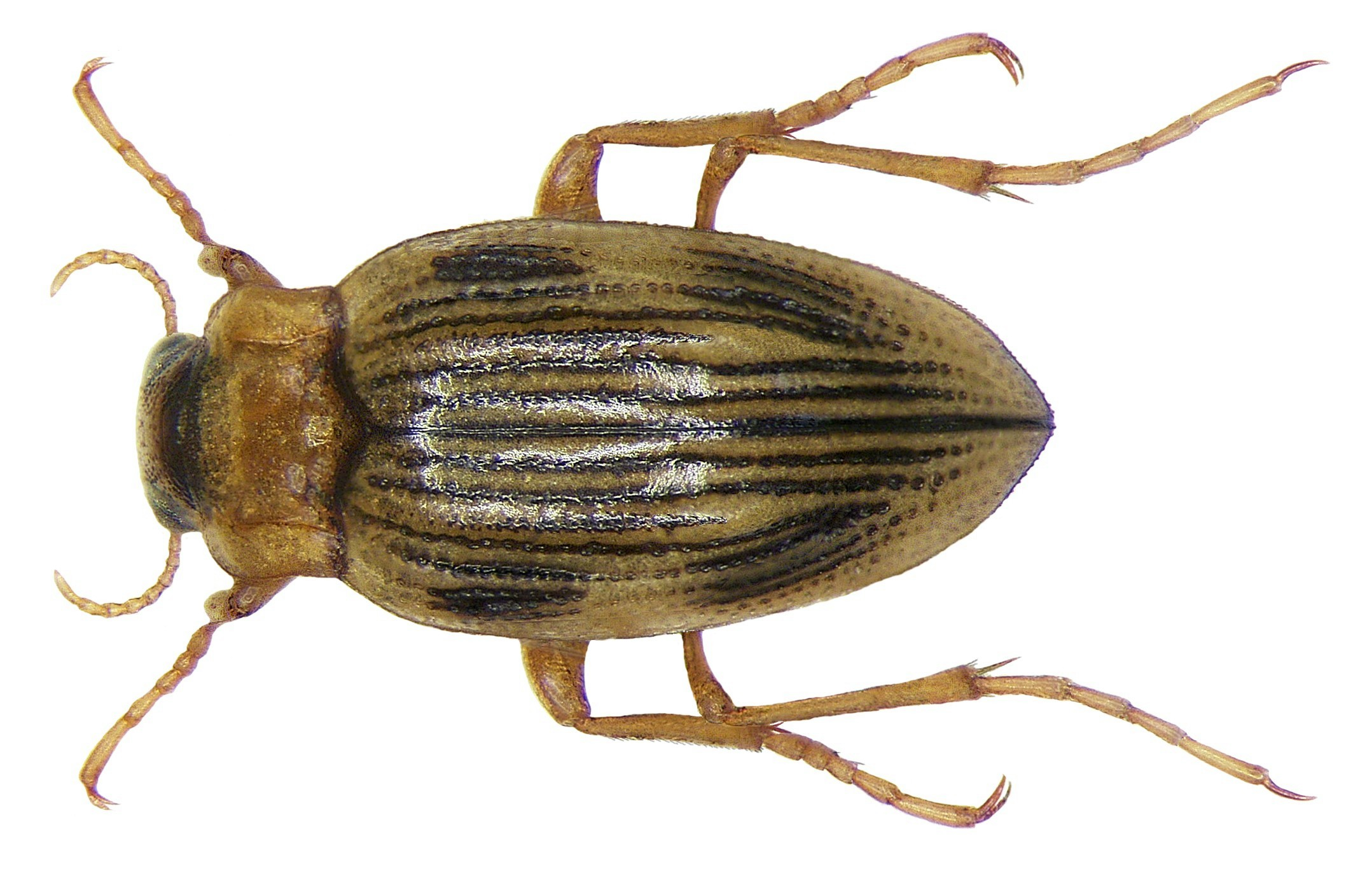

Scientific classification
- Kingdom: Animalia
- Phylum: Arthropoda
- Clade: Pancrustacea
- Class: Insecta
- Order: Coleoptera
- Suborder: Adephaga
- Family: Haliplidae
- Genus: Brychius
- Species: B. elevatus

Binomial name
- Brychius elevatus Panzer, 1793

= Brychius elevatus =

Species of beetle

Brychius elevatus is a species of beetle in the genus Brychius that was first described by Panzer in 1793.
