= Haliplus cribrarius =

Scientific classification
- Kingdom: Animalia
- Phylum: Arthropoda
- Clade: Pancrustacea
- Class: Insecta
- Order: Coleoptera
- Suborder: Adephaga
- Family: Haliplidae
- Genus: Haliplus
- Species: H. cribrarius

Binomial name
- Haliplus cribrarius LeConte, 1850

Species of beetle

Haliplus cribrarius is a species of beetle in the family Haliplidae.
