= Haliplus angusi =

Scientific classification
- Kingdom: Animalia
- Phylum: Arthropoda
- Clade: Pancrustacea
- Class: Insecta
- Order: Coleoptera
- Suborder: Adephaga
- Family: Haliplidae
- Genus: Haliplus
- Species: H. angusi

Binomial name
- Haliplus angusi Vondel, 1991

Species of beetle

Haliplus angusi is a species of Haliplidae in the genus Haliplus.
