= Madaglymbus =

Scientific classification
- Kingdom: Animalia
- Phylum: Arthropoda
- Class: Insecta
- Order: Coleoptera
- Suborder: Adephaga
- Family: Dytiscidae
- Subfamily: Copelatinae
- Tribe: Copelatini
- Genus: Madaglymbus; Shaverdo & Balke, 2008

Genus of beetles

Madaglymbus is a genus of predaceous diving beetles in the family Dytiscidae. There are about 15 described species in Madaglymbus. They are found in Africa.

== Species ==
These 15 species belong to the genus Madaglymbus:

- Madaglymbus alutaceus (Régimbart, 1900)
- Madaglymbus apicalis (Fairmaire, 1898)
- Madaglymbus elongatus (H.J. Kolbe, 1883)
- Madaglymbus fairmairei (Zimmermann, 1919)
- Madaglymbus formosulus (Guignot, 1956)
- Madaglymbus johannis (Wewalka, 1982)
- Madaglymbus kelimaso Ranarilalatiana & Bergsten, 2019
- Madaglymbus mathaei (Wewalka, 1982)
- Madaglymbus menalamba Ranarilalatiana & Bergsten, 2019
- Madaglymbus milloti (Guignot, 1959)
- Madaglymbus ruthwildae Shaverdo & Balke, 2008
- Madaglymbus semifactus Ranarilalatiana & Bergsten, 2019
- Madaglymbus strigulifer (Régimbart, 1903)
- Madaglymbus unguicularis (Régimbart, 1903)
- Madaglymbus xanthogrammus (Régimbart, 1900)
