= Lacconectus simoni =

Scientific classification
- Kingdom: Animalia
- Phylum: Arthropoda
- Class: Insecta
- Order: Coleoptera
- Suborder: Adephaga
- Family: Dytiscidae
- Genus: Lacconectus
- Species: L. simoni

Binomial name
- Lacconectus simoni Régimbart, 1893

Species of beetle

Lacconectus simoni, is a species of predaceous diving beetle found in India and Sri Lanka.
