= Agaporomorphus colberti =

Scientific classification
- Kingdom: Animalia
- Phylum: Arthropoda
- Clade: Pancrustacea
- Class: Insecta
- Order: Coleoptera
- Suborder: Adephaga
- Family: Dytiscidae
- Genus: Agaporomorphus; Mello-Leitão, 1923
- Species: A. colberti

Binomial name
- Agaporomorphus colberti Miller & Wheeler, 2008

Species of diving beetle

Agaporomorphus colberti is a species of diving beetle from the family Dytiscidae. It is one of the eight species under the genus Agaporomorphus.

== Taxonomy ==
The species as first formally described by Miller and Wheeler in 2008. The species was named after American comedian and television host Stephen Colbert, who satirically asked to have a species named after himself in May 2008. After the spider Aptostichus stephencolberti was named in August, Colbert jokingly asked the scientific community to name something "cooler than a spider" to honour him. Miller and Wheeler, the entomologists who discovered and named the species, stated it as being "way cooler" than a spider in response.

== Description ==
All Agaporomorphus species appear similar in size, shape, and colouration. However, A. colberti may be distinguished from the other species in the genus (except A. knischi) through the differences in its antennomeres and abdominal sternites. It differs from A. knischi (among other features) in the shape of the male median lobe of its aedeagus, which is broader.

A total of 11 specimens were found by the discoverers, who made measurements of several physical parameters for each specimen, the ranges of which are tabulated below.

Parameter	Abbreviation	Value
Total length	TL	2.93–3.18 mm
Greatest width across elytra	GW	1.39–1.57 mm
Greatest width of pronotum	PW	1.24–1.38 mm
Greatest width of head	HW	0.78–0.87 mm
Distance between eyes	EW	0.49–0.58 mm

Additionally, the lengths and widths of the metafemurs of each specimen were also measured. These measurements yield the following three ratios:

Parameter	Abbreviation	Value
Total length-to-greatest width across elytra ratio	TL/GW	1.97–2.18
Greatest head width-to-eye width ratio	HW/EW	1.50–1.64
Greatest metafemur width-to-greatest metafemur length ratio	FW/FL	2.59–3.22

A. colberti is coloured reddish brown on its dorsal surfaces and yellowish brown on its ventral surfaces (except the abdominal sternites, which are reddish yellow). The species exhibits notable sexual dimorphism.

== Habitat and distribution ==
The species was discovered in the Amazonas state in southern Venezuela, close to the country's border with Brazil. It is the only Agaporomorphus species known from Venezuela, and only one of two from northern South America, with A. pereirai known from Suriname. They are believed to live in very cryptic habitats, as the only manner in which they have been collected is through the usage of lights at night.

== See also ==
- Aptostichus stephencolberti#Naming, species of spider named after Stephen Colbert
