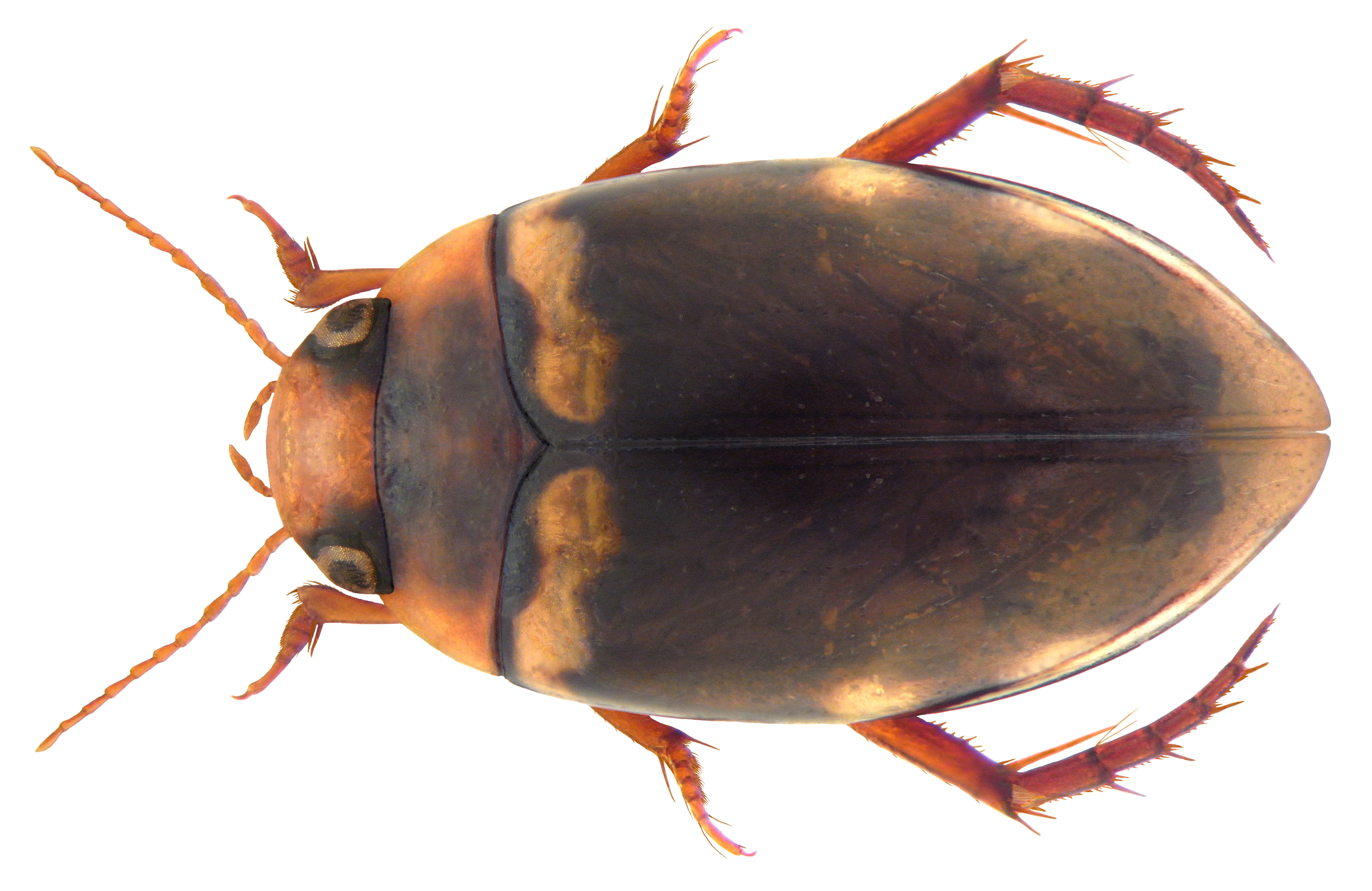
- Lacconectus basalis

Scientific classification
- Kingdom: Animalia
- Phylum: Arthropoda
- Class: Insecta
- Order: Coleoptera
- Suborder: Adephaga
- Family: Dytiscidae
- Subfamily: Copelatinae
- Genus: Lacconectus; Motschulsky, 1855

= Lacconectus =

Genus of beetles

Lacconectus is a genus of beetles in the family Dytiscidae, containing the following species:

- Lacconectus andrewesi Guignot, 1952
- Lacconectus arunachal Brancucci, 2006
- Lacconectus balkei Brancucci & Hendrich, 2005
- Lacconectus baolocensis Brancucci, 2004
- Lacconectus basalis Sharp, 1882
- Lacconectus birmanicus Brancucci, 1986
- Lacconectus biswasi Brancucci, 1986
- Lacconectus blandulus Brancucci, 2003
- Lacconectus corayi Brancucci, 1986
- Lacconectus fallaciosus Brancucci, 1986
- Lacconectus formosanus (Kamiya, 1938)
- Lacconectus freyi Guéorguiev, 1968
- Lacconectus fulvescens Motschulsky, 1855
- Lacconectus geiseri Brancucci, 2006
- Lacconectus gusenleitneri Brancucci, 1986
- Lacconectus hainanensis Hendrich, 1998
- Lacconectus heinertzi Brancucci, 1986
- Lacconectus heubergeri Brancucci & Hendrich, 2005
- Lacconectus holzschuhi Brancucci, 1986
- Lacconectus jaechi Brancucci, 2002
- Lacconectus javanicus Brancucci, 1986
- Lacconectus kelantanensis Brancucci & Hendrich, 2005
- Lacconectus khaosokensis Brancucci & Gusich, 2004
- Lacconectus klausnitzeri Brancucci, 2006
- Lacconectus krikkeni Brancucci, 1986
- Lacconectus kubani Brancucci, 2003
- Lacconectus laccophiloides Zimmermann, 1928
- Lacconectus lambai Vazirani, 1977
- Lacconectus loeiensis Brancucci, 1987
- Lacconectus maoyangensis Brancucci, 2003
- Lacconectus menglunensis Brancucci, 2003
- Lacconectus merguiensis Brancucci, 1986
- Lacconectus meyeri Brancucci, 2003
- Lacconectus minutus Brancucci, 1986
- Lacconectus muluensis Brancucci, 1986
- Lacconectus munnarensis Brancucci, 2003
- Lacconectus nepalensis Brancucci, 1989
- Lacconectus nicolasi Brancucci, 1986
- Lacconectus nigrita Brancucci, 2003
- Lacconectus oceanicus Régimbart, 1899
- Lacconectus ovalis Gschwendtner, 1936
- Lacconectus pacholatkoi Brancucci, 2003
- Lacconectus pederzanii Brancucci, 1986
- Lacconectus peguensis Brancucci, 1986
- Lacconectus ponti Brancucci, 1986
- Lacconectus pseudonicolasi Brancucci, 2003
- Lacconectus pseudosimilis Brancucci, 2003
- Lacconectus pulcher Brancucci, 1986
- Lacconectus punctatus Brancucci, 1986
- Lacconectus punctipennis Zimmermann, 1928
- Lacconectus regimbarti Brancucci, 1986
- Lacconectus ritsemae Régimbart, 1883
- Lacconectus rossi Brancucci, 1986
- Lacconectus rutilans Brancucci & Hendrich, 2005
- Lacconectus sabahensis Brancucci, 1986
- Lacconectus satoi Brancucci, 2003
- Lacconectus schawalleri Brancucci & Gusich, 2004
- Lacconectus schillhammeri Brancucci, 2003
- Lacconectus schoedli Brancucci, 2002
- Lacconectus schoenmanni Brancucci, 2002
- Lacconectus scholzi Gschwendtner, 1922
- Lacconectus shaverdoae Brancucci, 2005
- Lacconectus sikkimensis Brancucci, 1989
- Lacconectus similis Brancucci, 1986
- Lacconectus simoni Régimbart, 1893
- Lacconectus spangleri Brancucci, 1986
- Lacconectus splendidus Brancucci, 2003
- Lacconectus stastnyi Brancucci & Hendrich, 2005
- Lacconectus strigulifer Zimmermann, 1928
- Lacconectus tonkinensis Guignot, 1957
- Lacconectus tonkinoides Brancucci, 1986
- Lacconectus valeriae Brancucci, 2004
