= Bembidion laticeps =

Scientific classification
- Domain: Eukaryota
- Kingdom: Animalia
- Phylum: Arthropoda
- Class: Insecta
- Order: Coleoptera
- Suborder: Adephaga
- Family: Carabidae
- Genus: Bembidion
- Species: B. laticeps

Binomial name
- Bembidion laticeps (LeConte, 1858)

Synonyms
- Bembidion angusticeps Casey, 1918

Species of beetle

Bembidion laticeps is a small, fast-moving water beetle in the Trechinae subfamily.
