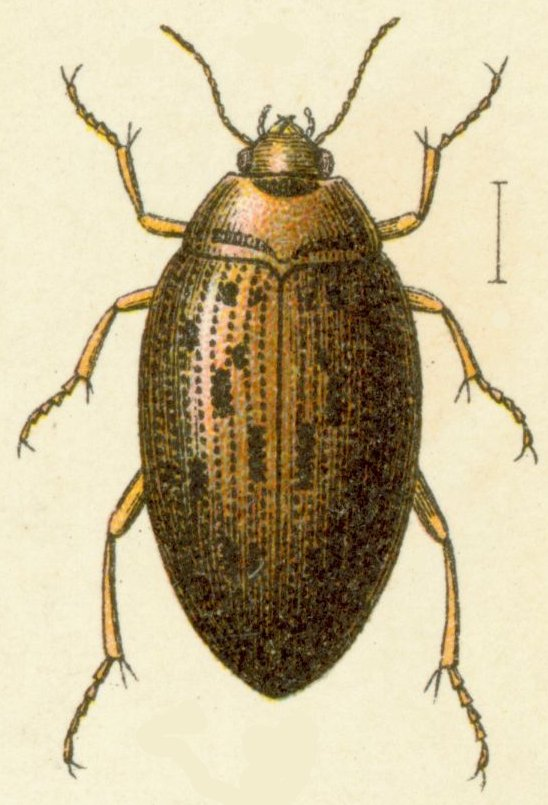
- Adult

Scientific classification
- Kingdom: Animalia
- Phylum: Arthropoda
- Clade: Pancrustacea
- Class: Insecta
- Order: Coleoptera
- Suborder: Adephaga
- Family: Haliplidae
- Genus: Haliplus
- Species: H. fulvus

Binomial name
- Haliplus fulvus (Fabricius, 1801)

Synonyms
- Dytiscus fulvus Fabricius, 1801; Haliplus salinarius Wallis, 1933; Haliplus subguttatus Roberts, 1913

= Haliplus fulvus =

Species of beetle

Haliplus fulvus is a species of crawling water beetle in the family Haliplidae. It is widely distributed in Europe and North America.

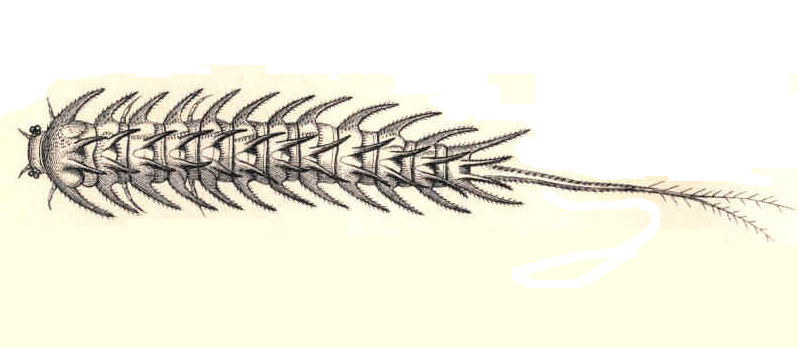
Larva

Adults measure 3.8–4.2 mm (0.15–0.17 in).
