= Lacconectus spangleri =

Scientific classification
- Kingdom: Animalia
- Phylum: Arthropoda
- Class: Insecta
- Order: Coleoptera
- Suborder: Adephaga
- Family: Dytiscidae
- Genus: Lacconectus
- Species: L. spangleri

Binomial name
- Lacconectus spangleri Brancucci, 1986

Species of beetle

Lacconectus spangleri, is a species of predaceous diving beetle widespread in India, Bangladesh, Bhutan, Myanmar, Nepal, Pakistan, and Sri Lanka.
