= John Braithwaite Wallis =

John Braithwaite Wallis (1876–1962) was a Canadian entomologist, a graduate of the University of Manitoba. The J.B. Wallis Museum of Entomology at the university was named in his honour. He was also a coleopterologist, having described many beetle species including Haliplus leechi.

== Sources ==
- Headrick, David; George Gordh (2003). A Dictionary of Entomology. Wallingford, United Kingdom: CABI Publishing. p. 979. ISBN 978-0-85199-655-4.
