= Capelatus =

Scientific classification
- Kingdom: Animalia
- Phylum: Arthropoda
- Class: Insecta
- Order: Coleoptera
- Suborder: Adephaga
- Family: Dytiscidae
- Tribe: Copelatini
- Genus: Capelatus
- Species: C. prykei

Binomial name
- Capelatus prykei Turner & Bilton, 2015

Monotypic genus of beetle

Capelatus is a monotypic genus of diving beetle found on the Cape Peninsula, close to Cape Town, South Africa.

The beetle's sole accepted species, Capelatus prykei, has no close relatives in Africa south of the Sahara, instead being related to beetles found in the Palaearctic and Australasia.
