= Agaporomorphus =

Scientific classification
- Kingdom: Animalia
- Phylum: Arthropoda
- Class: Insecta
- Order: Coleoptera
- Suborder: Adephaga
- Family: Dytiscidae
- Subfamily: Copelatinae
- Genus: Agaporomorphus; Zimmermann, 1921

Species
- See text

Genus of beetles

Agaporomorphus is a genus of beetles in the family Dytiscidae.

== Species ==
The genus contains the following species:

- Agaporomorphus colberti Miller & Wheeler, 2008
- Agaporomorphus dolichodactylus K.B.Miller, 2001
- Agaporomorphus grandisinuatus K.B.Miller, 2001
- Agaporomorphus knischi Zimmermann, 1921
- Agaporomorphus mecolobus K.B.Miller, 2001
- Agaporomorphus pereirai Guignot, 1957
- Agaporomorphus silvaticus K.B.Miller, 2005
- Agaporomorphus tambopatensis K.B.Miller, 2005
