= Algophilus =

Algophilus lathridioides

Scientific classification
- Kingdom: Animalia
- Phylum: Arthropoda
- Clade: Pancrustacea
- Class: Insecta
- Order: Coleoptera
- Suborder: Adephaga
- Family: Haliplidae
- Genus: Algophilus; Zimmermann, 1924
- Species: A. lathridioides

Binomial name
- Algophilus lathridioides Zimmermann, 1924

Genus of beetles

Algophilus lathridioides is a species of beetle in the family Haliplidae, the only species in the genus Algophilus. Its range includes parts of South Africa.
