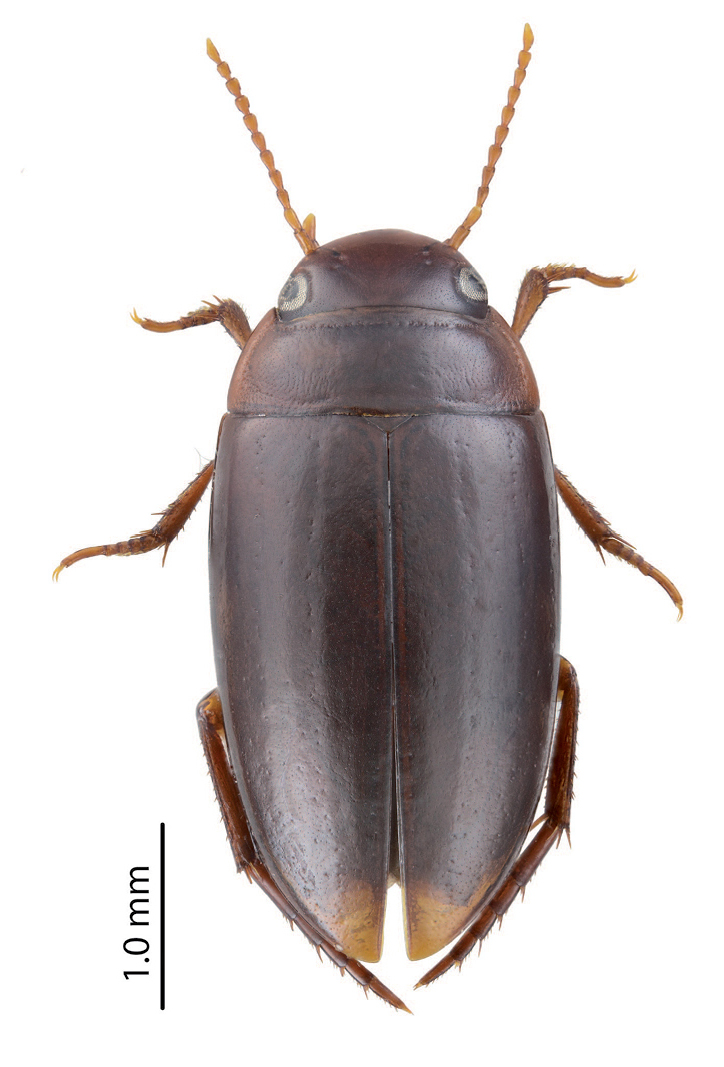

Scientific classification
- Kingdom: Animalia
- Phylum: Arthropoda
- Class: Insecta
- Order: Coleoptera
- Suborder: Adephaga
- Superfamily: Dytiscoidea
- Family: Dytiscidae
- Genus: Exocelina
- Species: E. fume

Binomial name
- Exocelina fume (Balke, 1998)

Synonyms
- Copelatus fume Balke, 1998; Papuadytes fume (Balke, 1998)

= Exocelina fume =

Species of beetle

Exocelina fume is a species of predaceous diving beetle in the family Dytiscidae. It is endemic to Papua New Guinea.
