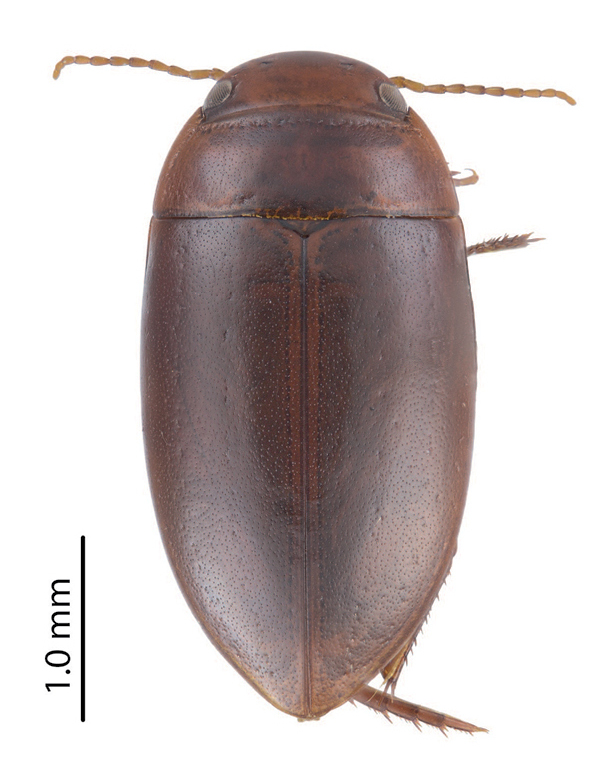

Scientific classification
- Kingdom: Animalia
- Phylum: Arthropoda
- Class: Insecta
- Order: Coleoptera
- Suborder: Adephaga
- Superfamily: Dytiscoidea
- Family: Dytiscidae
- Genus: Exocelina
- Species: E. desii

Binomial name
- Exocelina desii (Balke, 1999)

Synonyms
- Copelatus desii Balke, 1999; Papuadytes desii (Balke, 1999)

= Exocelina desii =

Species of beetle

Exocelina desii is a species of predaceous diving beetle in the family Dytiscidae. It is endemic to Papua New Guinea.
