= Cretihaliplus =

Scientific classification
- Kingdom: Animalia
- Phylum: Arthropoda
- Class: Insecta
- Order: Coleoptera
- Suborder: Adephaga
- Family: Haliplidae
- Genus: Cretihaliplus; Ren, Zhu & Lu, 1995

Genus of beetles

Cretihaliplus is a genus of beetles in the family Haliplidae, containing the following species:

- Cretihaliplus chifengensis Ren, Zhu & Lu, 1995
- Cretihaliplus sidaojingensis Ren, Zhu & Lu, 1995
