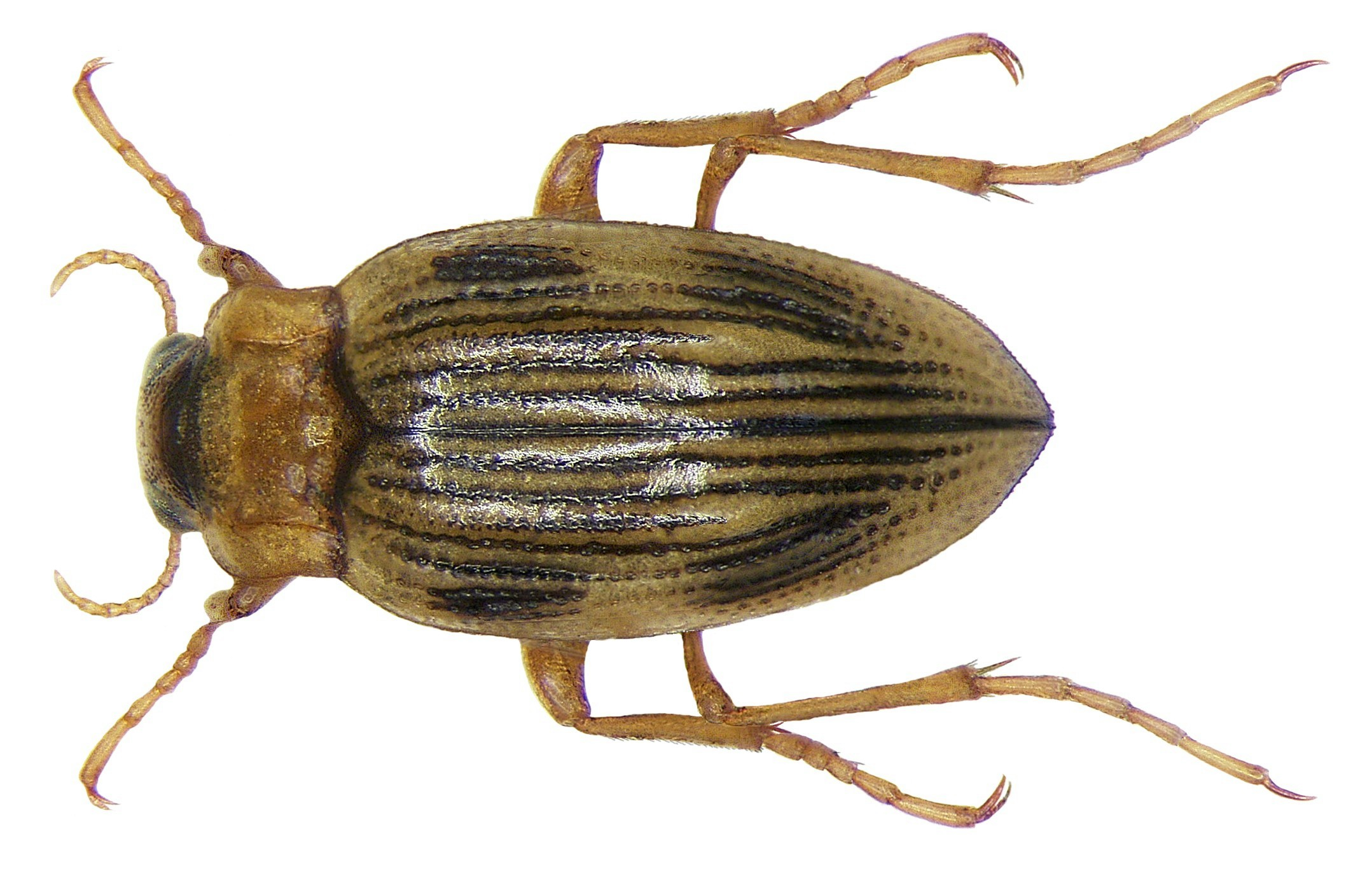
- Brychius elevatus

Scientific classification
- Kingdom: Animalia
- Phylum: Arthropoda
- Class: Insecta
- Order: Coleoptera
- Suborder: Adephaga
- Family: Haliplidae
- Genus: Brychius; Thomson, 1859

= Brychius =

Genus of beetles

Brychius is a genus of beetles in the family Haliplidae, containing the following species:

- Brychius elevatus (Panzer, 1793)
- Brychius glabratus (Villa & Villa, 1835)
- Brychius hornii Crotch, 1873
- Brychius hungerfordi Spangler, 1954
- Brychius pacificus Carr, 1928
