= Apteraliplus =

Scientific classification
- Domain: Eukaryota
- Kingdom: Animalia
- Phylum: Arthropoda
- Class: Insecta
- Order: Coleoptera
- Suborder: Adephaga
- Family: Haliplidae
- Genus: Apteraliplus; Chandler, 1943

Genus of beetles

Apteraliplus is a genus of crawling water beetles in the family Haliplidae. There is at least one described species in Apteraliplus, A. parvulus (Roberts, 1913), the flightless haliplid beetle.
