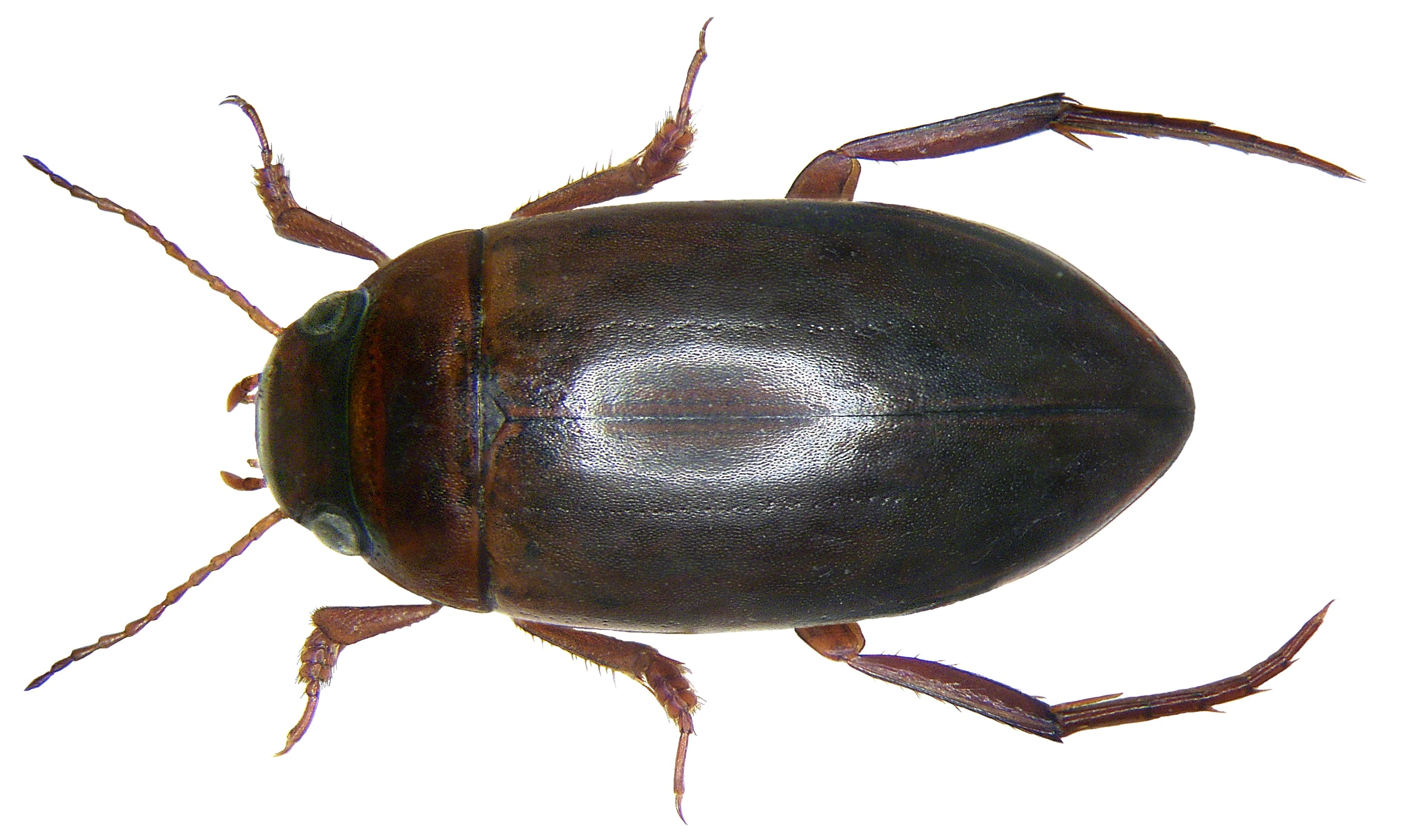
- Liopterus haemorrhoidalis (Fabricius, 1787)

Scientific classification
- Kingdom: Animalia
- Phylum: Arthropoda
- Class: Insecta
- Order: Coleoptera
- Suborder: Adephaga
- Family: Dytiscidae
- Subfamily: Copelatinae
- Genus: Liopterus; Dejean, 1833

= Liopterus =

Genus of beetles

Liopterus is a genus of beetles in the family Dytiscidae, containing the following species:

- Liopterus atriceps (Sharp, 1882)
- Liopterus haemorrhoidalis (Fabricius, 1787)
