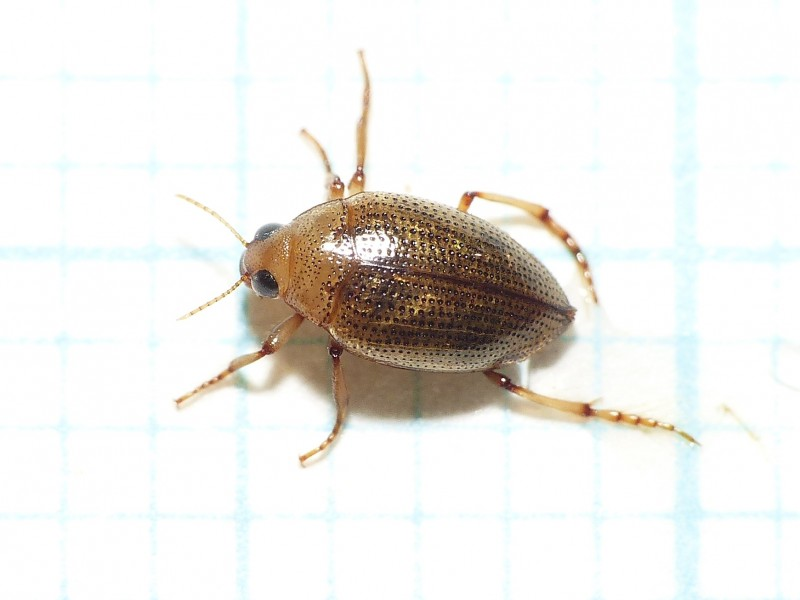
- Haliplus flavicollis

Scientific classification
- Kingdom: Animalia
- Phylum: Arthropoda
- Clade: Pancrustacea
- Class: Insecta
- Order: Coleoptera
- Suborder: Adephaga
- Family: Haliplidae
- Genus: Haliplus; Latreille, 1802

= Haliplus =

Genus of beetles

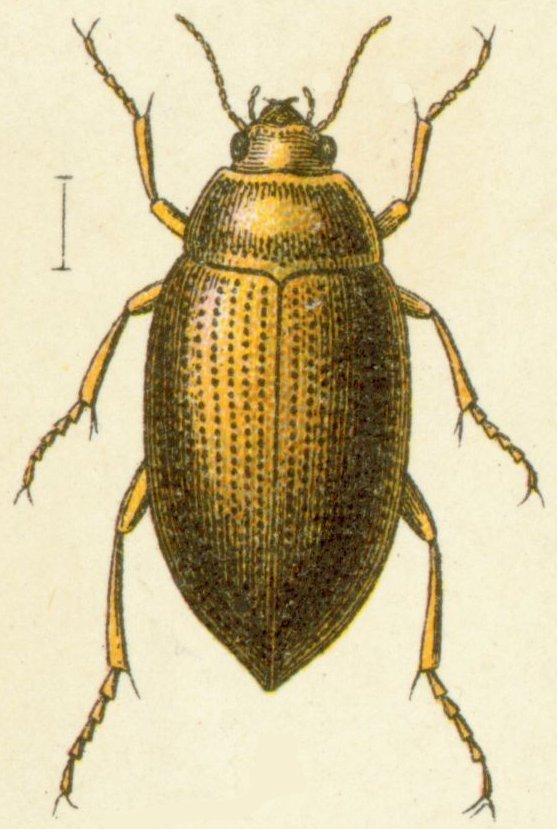
Haliplus mucronatus

Haliplus is a genus of crawling water beetles in the family Haliplidae. There are at least 180 described species in Haliplus. They are found worldwide, except for Antarctica, living among algae and aquatic vegetation at edges of ponds, lakes, and streams. They range in size from 1.75 to 5 mm.

== Species ==
These species are members of the genus Haliplus.

- Haliplus abbreviatus Wehncke, 1880^{g}
- Haliplus africanus Aubé, 1838
- Haliplus alastairi Watts, 1988
- Haliplus aliae Vondel, 2003^{g}
- Haliplus allisonae Brigham^{i c g}
- Haliplus alluaudi Régimbart, 1903
- Haliplus andalusicus Wehncke, 1872^{g}
- Haliplus angusi Vondel, 1991
- Haliplus angustifrons Regimbart, 1892^{g}
- Haliplus annulatus Roberts, 1913^{i c g}
- Haliplus apicalis (Thomson)^{g b} (saltmarsh crawler)
- Haliplus apostolicus Wallis, 1933^{i c g}
- Haliplus arrowi Guignot, 1936
- Haliplus aspilus Guignot, 1957
- Haliplus astrakhanus Vondel, 1991^{g}
- Haliplus australis Clark, 1862
- Haliplus bachmanni Vidal, Sarmiento & Grosso, 1970
- Haliplus basinotatus Zimmermann, 1924^{g}
- Haliplus bierigi Guignot, 1936^{i c g}
- Haliplus bistriatus Wehncke, 1883^{g}
- Haliplus blanchardi Roberts, 1913^{i c g}
- Haliplus bonariensis Steinheil, 1869
- Haliplus borealis LeConte, 1850^{i c g}
- Haliplus brandeni Wehncke, 1888^{i c g}
- Haliplus brasiliensis Zimmermann, 1924
- Haliplus camposi Guignot, 1948
- Haliplus canadensis Wallis, 1933^{i c g b}
- Haliplus carinatus Guignot, 1936^{i c g}
- Haliplus chinensis Falkenstroem, 1932^{g}
- Haliplus columbiensis Wallis, 1933^{i c g}
- Haliplus concolor Leconte, 1852^{i c g b}
- Haliplus confinis Stephens, 1828^{g}
- Haliplus confluentus Roberts, 1913^{i c g}
- Haliplus connexus Matheson, 1912^{i c g b}
- Haliplus crassus Chapin, 1930^{i c g}
- Haliplus cribrarius Leconte, 1950^{i c g b}
- Haliplus cubensis Chapin, 1930^{i c g}
- Haliplus curtulus Sharp, 1887^{i c g}
- Haliplus cylindricus Roberts, 1913^{i c g}
- Haliplus dalmatinus Muller, 1900^{g}
- Haliplus davidi Vondel, 1991^{g}
- Haliplus deceptus Matheson, 1912^{i c g}
- Haliplus diopus Guignot, 1955
- Haliplus diruptus J.Balfour-Browne, 1947^{g}
- Haliplus discessus Guignot, 1936
- Haliplus distinctus Wallis, 1933^{i c g}
- Haliplus dorsomaculatus Zimmermann, 1924^{i c g b}
- Haliplus ebolovensis Guignot, 1955
- Haliplus eremicus Wells, 1989
- Haliplus excoffieri Vondel, 1991^{g}
- Haliplus eximius Clark, 1863^{g}
- Haliplus exsecratus Guignot, 1936
- Haliplus falli Mank, 1940^{i c g}
- Haliplus fasciatus Aubé, 1838^{i c g b}
- Haliplus ferruginipes Régimbart, 1892
- Haliplus figuratus J.Sahlberg, 1908
- Haliplus fiorentini Benetti and Hamada, 2017^{g}
- Haliplus flavicollis Sturm, 1834^{g}
- Haliplus fluviatilis Aubé, 1836^{g}
- Haliplus fulvicollis Erichson, 1837^{g}
- Haliplus fulvus (Fabricius, 1801)^{g b}
- Haliplus furcatus Seidlitz, 1887^{g}
- Haliplus fuscatus Clark, 1862
- Haliplus fuscicornis Holmen, Vondel & Petrov, 2006
- Haliplus fuscipennis Germain, 1855
- Haliplus gafnyi Vondel, 1991^{g}
- Haliplus garambanus Guignot, 1958
- Haliplus gibbus Clark, 1862
- Haliplus gracilis Roberts, 1913^{i c g b}
- Haliplus gravidoides Vondel & Spangler, 2008^{g}
- Haliplus gravidus Aube, 1836^{i c g}
- Haliplus guttatus Aubé, 1836^{g}
- Haliplus harminae Vondel, 1990
- Haliplus havaniensis Wehncke, 1880^{i c g}
- Haliplus heydeni Wehncke, 1875^{g}
- Haliplus holmeni Vondel, 1991^{g}
- Haliplus hoppingi Wallis, 1933^{i c g}
- Haliplus hydei Vondel, 1995
- Haliplus immaculatus Gerhardt, 1877^{g}
- Haliplus immaculicollis Harris, 1828^{i c g b}
- Haliplus incrassatus Régimbart, 1899
- Haliplus indicus Régimbart, 1899
- Haliplus indistinctus Zimmermann, 1928
- Haliplus insularis Guignot, 1960
- Haliplus interjectus Lindberg, 1937^{g}
- Haliplus japonicus Sharp, 1873^{g}
- Haliplus javanicus Vondel, 1993
- Haliplus kamiyai Nakane, 1963
- Haliplus kapuri Vazirani, 1975
- Haliplus kirgisiensis Holmen & Vondel, 2006
- Haliplus kotoshonis Kano & Kamiya, 1932^{g}
- Haliplus kulleri Vondel, 1988^{g}
- Haliplus laminatus (Schaller, 1783)^{g}
- Haliplus lamottei Legros, 1954
- Haliplus latiusculus Nakane, 1985
- Haliplus leechi Wallis, 1933^{i c g b}
- Haliplus leopardus Roberts, 1913^{i c g b}
- Haliplus lewisii Crotch, 1873^{b}
- Haliplus lineatocollis (Marsham, 1802)^{g}
- Haliplus lineolatus Mannerheim, 1844^{g}
- Haliplus longulus Leconte, 1950^{i c g b}
- Haliplus maculatus Motschulsky, 1860^{g}
- Haliplus maculicollis Zimmermann, 1924
- Haliplus maculipennis Schaum, 1864
- Haliplus manipurensis Vazirani, 1966
- Haliplus methneri Zimmermann, 1926
- Haliplus mimeticus Matheson, 1912^{i c g}
- Haliplus mimulus Guignot, 1956
- Haliplus minor Zimmermann, 1924^{i c g}
- Haliplus mucronatus Stephens, 1828^{g}
- Haliplus mutchleri Wallis^{i c g}
- Haliplus nanus Guignot, 1936^{i c g}
- Haliplus napolovi Vondel, 2003
- Haliplus natalensis Wehncke, 1880^{g}
- Haliplus nedungaduensis Vondel, 1993
- Haliplus nitens LeConte, 1850^{i c g}
- Haliplus oberthuri Guignot, 1935^{g}
- Haliplus obliquus (Fabricius, 1787)^{g}
- Haliplus oblongus Zimmermann, 1921
- Haliplus ohioensis Wallis, 1933^{i c g}
- Haliplus oklahomensis Wallis, 1933^{i c g}
- Haliplus ornatipennis Zimmermann, 1921
- Haliplus ovalis Sharp, 1884
- Haliplus panamanus Chapin, 1930^{i c g}
- Haliplus pantherinus Aube, 1938^{i c g b}
- Haliplus perroti Guignot, 1950
- Haliplus peruanus Zimmermann, 1924
- Haliplus philippinus Chapin, 1930
- Haliplus pruthii Vazirani, 1966
- Haliplus pseudofasciatus Wallis, 1933^{i c g}
- Haliplus pulchellus Clark, 1863^{g}
- Haliplus punctatus Aube, 1838^{i c g}
- Haliplus regili Benetti and Hamada, 2017^{g}
- Haliplus regimbarti Zaitzev, 1907^{g}
- Haliplus rejseki Stastny & Boukal, 2003^{g}
- Haliplus robertsi Zimmermann, 1924^{i c g b}
- Haliplus rubidus Perris, 1857^{g}
- Haliplus rufescens Régimbart, 1894
- Haliplus ruficeps Chevrolat, 1861^{g}
- Haliplus ruficollis (De Geer, 1774)^{g}
- Haliplus rugosus Roberts, 1913^{i c g}
- Haliplus salinarius Wallis, 1933^{i c g}
- Haliplus salmo Wallis, 1933^{i c g b}
- Haliplus samojedorum J.Sahlberg, 1880
- Haliplus samosirensis Vondel, 1993
- Haliplus sharpi Wehncke, 1880^{g}
- Haliplus sibiricus Motschulsky, 1860^{g}
- Haliplus signatipennis Régimbart, 1892
- Haliplus signatus Sharp, 1882
- Haliplus simplex Clark, 1863^{g}
- Haliplus sindus Watts, 1988
- Haliplus solitarius Sharp, 1882^{i c g}
- Haliplus srilankanus Vondel, 1993
- Haliplus stagninus Leech, 1948^{i c g b}
- Haliplus stepheni Watts, 1988
- Haliplus steppensis Guignot, 1954^{g}
- Haliplus storeyi Vondel, 1995
- Haliplus strigatus Roberts, 1913^{i c g}
- Haliplus subguttatus Roberts, 1913^{i c g b}
- Haliplus subseriatus Zimmermann, 1921
- Haliplus testaceus Zimmermann, 1924
- Haliplus testudo Clark, 1862
- Haliplus thoracicus Zimmermann, 1923
- Haliplus timmsi Vondel, 1995
- Haliplus tortilipennis Brigham & Sanderson, 1972^{i c g}
- Haliplus triopsis Say, 1825^{i c g b}
- Haliplus tumidus Leconte, 1880^{i c g b}
- Haliplus turkmenicus Vondel, 2006
- Haliplus ungularis Wallis, 1933^{i c g}
- Haliplus uniformis Zimmermann, 1920
- Haliplus valdiviensis Moroni, 1980
- Haliplus vancouverensis Matheson, 1912^{i c g}
- Haliplus varicator Guignot, 1954
- Haliplus variegatus Sturm, 1834^{g}
- Haliplus variomaculatus Brigham and Sanderson^{i c g}
- Haliplus varius Nicolai, 1822^{g}
- Haliplus venustus Régimbart, 1894
- Haliplus wallisi Hatch^{i c g}
- Haliplus wattsi Vondel, 1995
- Haliplus zacharenkoi Gramma & Prisny, 1973^{g}

Data sources: i = ITIS, c = Catalogue of Life, g = GBIF, b = Bugguide.net
