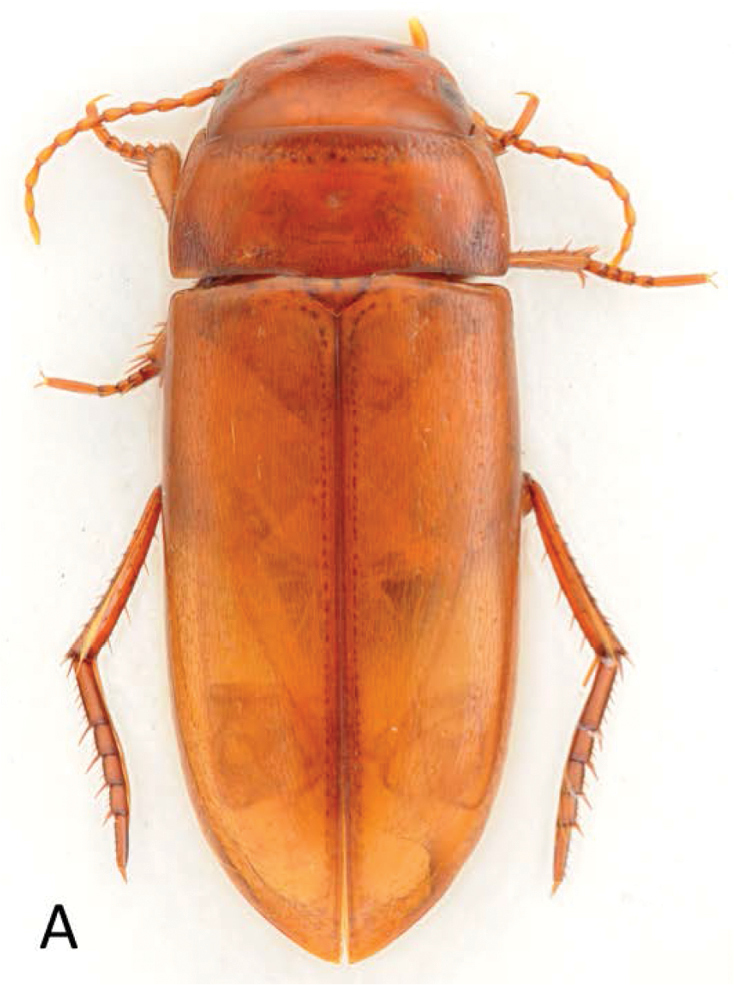
- Exocelina australis, Australia

Scientific classification
- Kingdom: Animalia
- Phylum: Arthropoda
- Class: Insecta
- Order: Coleoptera
- Suborder: Adephaga
- Superfamily: Dytiscoidea
- Family: Dytiscidae
- Genus: Exocelina; Broun, 1886

Synonyms
- Papuadytes Balke, 1998

= Exocelina =

Genus of beetles

Exocelina is a genus of diving beetles in the family Dytiscidae. There are more than 200 described species in Exocelina, found mainly in Oceania, including Australia and New Zealand. 145 of these species have been described from New Guinea.

== Species ==
These 208 species belong to the genus Exocelina:

- Exocelina abdita (Balke, Watts, Cooper, Humphreys & Vogler, 2004)
- Exocelina adelbertensis Shaverdo & Balke, 2018
- Exocelina aipo (Balke, 1998)
- Exocelina aipomek (Balke, 1998)
- Exocelina akameku Shaverdo & Balke, 2019
- Exocelina alexanderi Shaverdo, Hendrich & Balke, 2012
- Exocelina allerbergeri Wewalka, Balke & Hendrich, 2010
- Exocelina amabilis Shaverdo & Balke, 2020
- Exocelina ambua Shaverdo & Balke, 2018
- Exocelina andakombensis Shaverdo & Balke, 2016
- Exocelina anggiensis Shaverdo, Hendrich & Balke, 2012
- Exocelina apistefti Shaverdo, Surbakti & Balke 2021
- Exocelina arfakensis Shaverdo, Hendrich & Balke, 2012
- Exocelina ascendens (Balke, 1998)
- Exocelina aseki Shaverdo & Balke, 2019
- Exocelina astrophallus (Balke, 1998)
- Exocelina athesphati Shaverdo, Surbakti, Sumoked & Balke, 2020
- Exocelina atowaso (Shaverdo, Sagata & Balke, 2005)
- Exocelina atra (Sharp, 1882)
- Exocelina atrata (J. Balfour-Browne, 1939)
- Exocelina atripennis (J. Balfour-Browne, 1939)
- Exocelina aubei (Montrouzier, 1860)
- Exocelina australiae (Clark, 1863)
- Exocelina australis (Clark, 1863)
- Exocelina bacchus Balke, 2021
- Exocelina bagus (Balke & Hendrich)
- Exocelina baliem Shaverdo, Hendrich & Balke, 2013
- Exocelina barbarae Wewalka, Balke & Hendrich, 2010
- Exocelina bewani Shaverdo & Balke, 2018
- Exocelina bewaniensis Shaverdo, Menufandu & Balke, 2014
- Exocelina bifida Shaverdo, Hendrich & Balke, 2012
- Exocelina bimaculata (Perroud & Montrouzier, 1864)
- Exocelina bismarckensis Shaverdo & Balke, 2014
- Exocelina boulevardi (Watts, 1978)
- Exocelina brahminensis Shaverdo, Hendrich & Balke, 2012
- Exocelina brazza Shaverdo & Balke, 2020
- Exocelina broschii (Balke, 1998)
- Exocelina brownei (Guignot, 1942)
- Exocelina brunoi Wewalka, Balke & Hendrich, 2010
- Exocelina bundiensis Shaverdo, Hendrich & Balke, 2012
- Exocelina burwelli Wewalka, Balke & Hendrich, 2010
- Exocelina casuarina (Balke & Hendrich, 1998)
- Exocelina charlottae Wewalka, Balke & Hendrich, 2010
- Exocelina cheesmanae (J. Balfour-Browne, 1939)
- Exocelina commatifera (Heller, 1916)
- Exocelina craterensis Shaverdo & Balke, 2014
- Exocelina creuxorum Wewalka, Balke & Hendrich, 2010
- Exocelina cyclops Shaverdo & Balke, 2018
- Exocelina damantiensis (Balke, 1998)
- Exocelina danae (Balke, 1998)
- Exocelina desii (Balke, 1999)
- Exocelina edeltraudae Shaverdo, Hendrich & Balke, 2012
- Exocelina ekari Shaverdo, Hendrich & Balke, 2012
- Exocelina ekpliktiki Shaverdo, Surbakti & Balke, 2021
- Exocelina elongatula (W. J. MacLeay, 1871)
- Exocelina eme Shaverdo, Hendrich & Balke, 2012
- Exocelina erteldi (Balke, 1998)
- Exocelina evelyncheesmanae Shaverdo, Hendrich & Balke, 2012
- Exocelina ferruginea (Sharp, 1882)
- Exocelina feryi Wewalka, Balke & Hendrich, 2010
- Exocelina flammi Wewalka, Balke & Hendrich, 2010
- Exocelina foja Shaverdo, Surbakti & Balke, 2021
- Exocelina fume (Balke, 1998)
- Exocelina gapa (Watts, 1978)
- Exocelina garana Shaverdo & Balke, 2016
- Exocelina gaulorum Wewalka, Balke & Hendrich, 2010
- Exocelina gelima Wewalka, Balke & Hendrich, 2010
- Exocelina glypta (Guignot, 1955)
- Exocelina gorokaensis Shaverdo & Balke, 2014
- Exocelina gracilis (Sharp, 1882)
- Exocelina haia Shaverdo & Balke, 2019
- Exocelina hansferyi Shaverdo, Hendrich & Balke, 2012
- Exocelina heidiae (Balke, 1998)
- Exocelina herowana Shaverdo & Balke, 2014
- Exocelina hintelmannae (Shaverdo, Sagata & Balke, 2005)
- Exocelina hudsoni Shaverdo, Surbakti & Balke, 2021
- Exocelina ibalimi Shaverdo & Balke, 2018
- Exocelina inexspectata Wewalka, Balke & Hendrich, 2010
- Exocelina injiensis Shaverdo & Balke, 2016
- Exocelina interrupta (Perroud & Montrouzier, 1864)
- Exocelina iratoi Shaverdo, Wild, Sumoked & Balke, 2017
- Exocelina irianensis Shaverdo, Hendrich & Balke, 2012
- Exocelina jaseminae (Balke, 1998)
- Exocelina jeannae Wewalka, Balke & Hendrich, 2010
- Exocelina jimiensis Shaverdo & Balke, 2014
- Exocelina kabwumensis Shaverdo & Balke, 2016
- Exocelina kailaki Shaverdo & Balke, 2019
- Exocelina kainantuensis (Balke, 2001)
- Exocelina kakapupu Shaverdo, Hendrich & Balke, 2012
- Exocelina karmurensis (Balke, 1998)
- Exocelina keki Shaverdo & Balke, 2018
- Exocelina ketembang (Balke, 1998)
- Exocelina kinibeli Shaverdo & Balke, 2014
- Exocelina kisli Shaverdo & Balke, 2014
- Exocelina knoepfchen Shaverdo, Hendrich & Balke, 2012
- Exocelina kobau Shaverdo & Balke, 2019
- Exocelina koghis Wewalka, Balke & Hendrich, 2010
- Exocelina kolleri Wewalka, Balke & Hendrich, 2010
- Exocelina koroba Shaverdo & Balke, 2019
- Exocelina kowalskii Shaverdo & Balke, 2019
- Exocelina ksionseki Shaverdo & Balke, 2014
- Exocelina kumulensis Shaverdo & Balke, 2018
- Exocelina larsoni (Balke, 1998)
- Exocelina leae Wewalka, Balke & Hendrich, 2010
- Exocelina lembena Shaverdo & Balke, 2014
- Exocelina likui Shaverdo, Wild, Sumoked & Balke, 2017
- Exocelina lilianae Wewalka, Balke & Hendrich, 2010
- Exocelina maculata (Sharp, 1882)
- Exocelina manfredi (Balke, 1998)
- Exocelina manokwariensis Shaverdo, Panjaitan & Balke, 2016
- Exocelina mantembu Shaverdo & Balke, 2014
- Exocelina marawaka Shaverdo & Balke, 2016
- Exocelina marinae (Shaverdo, Sagata & Balke, 2005)
- Exocelina me (Balke, 1998)
- Exocelina mekilensis Shaverdo & Balke, 2019
- Exocelina melanaria (Sharp, 1882)
- Exocelina mendiensis Shaverdo & Balke, 2018
- Exocelina menyamya Shaverdo & Balke, 2018
- Exocelina messeri (Balke, 1999)
- Exocelina mianminensis Shaverdo & Balke, 2019
- Exocelina michaelensis Shaverdo & Balke, 2014
- Exocelina mimika Shaverdo & Balke, 2020
- Exocelina miriae (Balke, 1998)
- Exocelina monae (Balke, 1998)
- Exocelina mondmillensis Shaverdo, Sagata & Balke, 2016
- Exocelina monteithi Wewalka, Balke & Hendrich, 2010
- Exocelina morobensis Shaverdo & Balke, 2019
- Exocelina munaso (Shaverdo, Sagata & Balke, 2005)
- Exocelina nehoue Balke, Hájek, Hendrich & Wewalka, 2014
- Exocelina nielsi Wewalka, Balke & Hendrich, 2010
- Exocelina niklasi Wewalka, Balke & Hendrich, 2010
- Exocelina nomax (J. Balfour-Browne, 1939)
- Exocelina novaecaledoniae (J. Balfour-Browne, 1939)
- Exocelina oceai Shaverdo, Hendrich & Balke, 2012
- Exocelina oiwa Shaverdo & Balke, 2019
- Exocelina okapa Shaverdo & Balke, 2018
- Exocelina okbapensis Shaverdo & Balke, 2017
- Exocelina oksibilensis Shaverdo, Surbakti, Warikar & Balke, 2019
- Exocelina oraia Shaverdo, Surbakti & Balke, 2021
- Exocelina ouin Wewalka, Balke & Hendrich, 2010
- Exocelina parvula (Boisduval, 1835)
- Exocelina perfecta (Sharp, 1882)
- Exocelina pinocchi Shaverdo & Balke, 2014
- Exocelina piusi Shaverdo & Balke, 2018
- Exocelina poellabauerae Wewalka, Balke & Hendrich, 2010
- Exocelina polita (Sharp, 1882)
- Exocelina posmani Shaverdo & Balke, 2016
- Exocelina pseudoastrophallus Shaverdo & Balke, 2014
- Exocelina pseudobifida Shaverdo & Balke, 2014
- Exocelina pseudoedeltraudae Shaverdo & Balke, 2014
- Exocelina pseudoeme Shaverdo & Balke, 2014
- Exocelina pseudofume Shaverdo & Balke, 2018
- Exocelina pseudojaseminae Shaverdo & Balke, 2019
- Exocelina pseudomarinae Shaverdo, Sagata & Balke, 2016
- Exocelina pseudopusilla Shaverdo & Balke, 2018
- Exocelina pseudosoppi Shaverdo, Hendrich & Balke, 2012
- Exocelina pui Shaverdo, Wild, Sumoked & Balke, 2017
- Exocelina pulchella Shaverdo & Balke, 2019
- Exocelina pulukensis Shaverdo, Wild, Sumoked & Balke, 2017
- Exocelina punctipennis (Lea, 1899)
- Exocelina pusilla Shaverdo & Balke, 2018
- Exocelina ransikiensis Shaverdo, Panjaitan & Balke, 2016
- Exocelina rasilis (Lea, 1899)
- Exocelina rasjadi Watts & Humphreys, 2009
- Exocelina remyi Wewalka, Balke & Hendrich, 2010
- Exocelina riberai Shaverdo, Surbakti & Balke, 2021
- Exocelina rotteri Wewalka, Balke & Hendrich, 2010
- Exocelina rufa (Balke, 1998)
- Exocelina saltusholmesensis Watts, Hendrich & Balke, 2016
- Exocelina saudaunensis Shaverdo & Balke, 2014
- Exocelina schoelleri Wewalka, Balke & Hendrich, 2010
- Exocelina shizong (Balke & Bergsten, 2003)
- Exocelina sima Shaverdo & Balke, 2018
- Exocelina simbaiarea Shaverdo & Balke, 2014
- Exocelina simbaiensis Shaverdo & Balke, 2018
- Exocelina simbaijimi Shaverdo & Balke, 2018
- Exocelina simoni Wewalka, Balke & Hendrich, 2010
- Exocelina simplex (Clark, 1863)
- Exocelina skalei Shaverdo & Balke, 2014
- Exocelina soppi Shaverdo, Hendrich & Balke, 2012
- Exocelina staneki Wewalka, Balke & Hendrich, 2010
- Exocelina subjecta (Sharp, 1882)
- Exocelina sugayai Balke & Ribera, 2020
- Exocelina sumokedi Shaverdo & Balke, 2018
- Exocelina tabubilensis Shaverdo & Balke, 2014
- Exocelina takime (Balke, 1998)
- Exocelina talaki (Balke, 1998)
- Exocelina tariensis Shaverdo & Balke, 2014
- Exocelina tekadu Shaverdo & Balke, 2016
- Exocelina tomhansi Shaverdo, Wild, Sumoked & Balke, 2017
- Exocelina tsinga Shaverdo, Surbakti, Sumoked & Balke, 2020
- Exocelina ullrichi (Balke, 1998)
- Exocelina unipo Shaverdo, Hendrich & Balke, 2012
- Exocelina utowaensis Shaverdo, Hendrich & Balke, 2012
- Exocelina varirata Shaverdo & Balke, 2016
- Exocelina vladimiri (Shaverdo, Sagata & Balke, 2005)
- Exocelina vovai Shaverdo & Balke, 2014
- Exocelina waaf Shaverdo, Surbakti & Balke, 2021
- Exocelina waigeoensis Shaverdo, Hendrich & Balke, 2012
- Exocelina wannangensis Shaverdo & Balke, 2014
- Exocelina warahulenensis Shaverdo & Balke, 2019
- Exocelina warasera Shaverdo & Balke, 2019
- Exocelina wareaga Shaverdo & Balke, 2016
- Exocelina weylandensis Shaverdo, Hendrich & Balke, 2012
- Exocelina wigodukensis Shaverdo, Wild, Sumoked & Balke, 2017
- Exocelina woitapensis Shaverdo & Balke, 2016
- Exocelina wondiwoiensis Shaverdo, Hendrich & Balke, 2012
- Exocelina yoginofi Shaverdo & Balke, 2018
