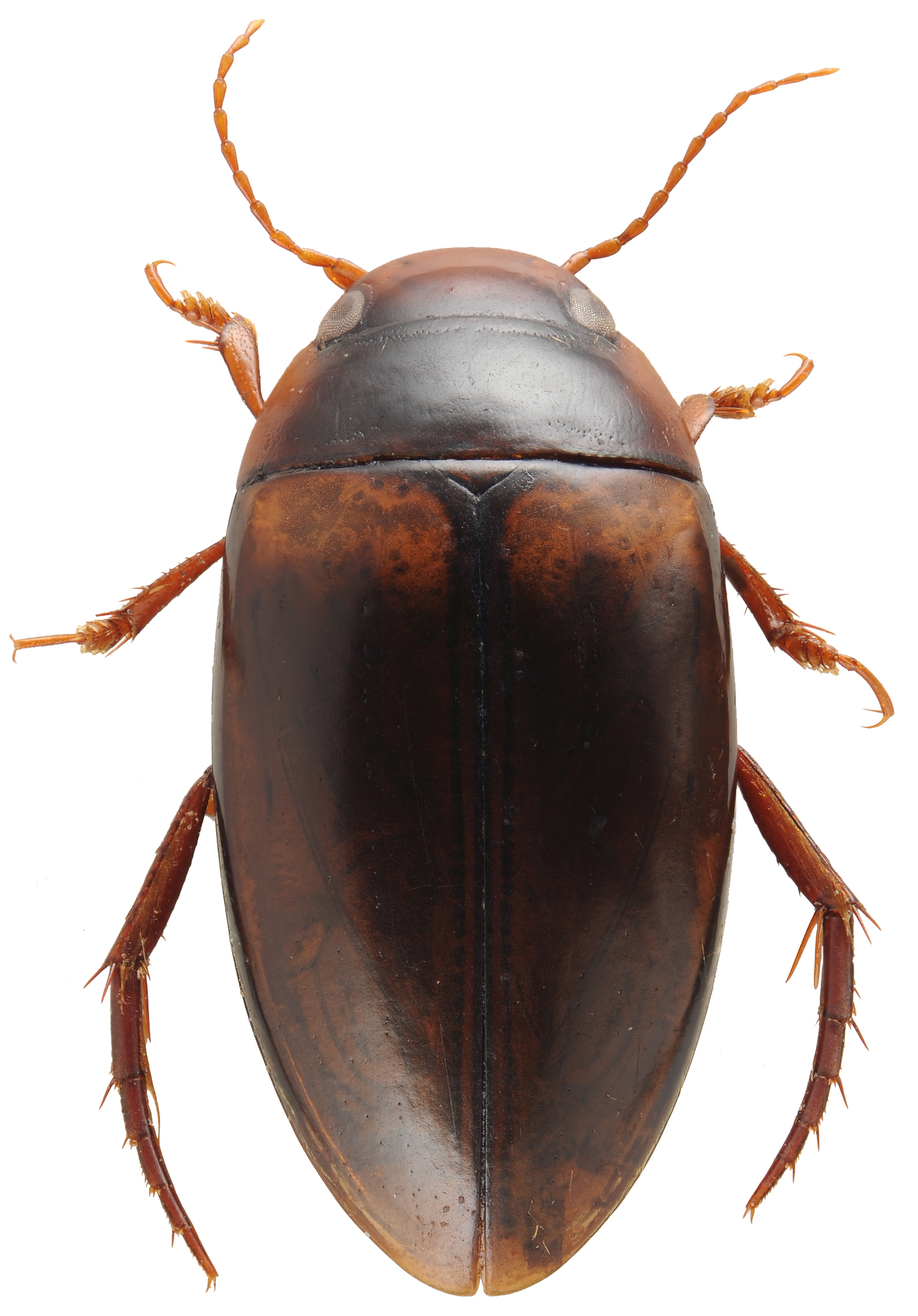
- Copelatus sibelaemontis

Scientific classification
- Kingdom: Animalia
- Phylum: Arthropoda
- Clade: Pancrustacea
- Class: Insecta
- Order: Coleoptera
- Suborder: Adephaga
- Family: Dytiscidae
- Subfamily: Copelatinae
- Tribe: Copelatini; Branden, 1885

= Copelatini =

Subfamily of beetles

Copelatini is a tribe of diving beetles in the family Dytiscidae. It is the sole tribe in the subfamily Copelatinae. The largest genus within the tribe is Copelatus, which has about 470 described species found worldwide, but most diverse in tropical South America, Africa and South-East Asia.

Genera accepted within the tribe:

- Agaporomorphus
- Aglymbus
- Capelatus
- Copelatus
- Exocelina
- Lacconectus
- Liopterus
- Madaglymbus
