= Water beetle =

Common name for any beetle living in water

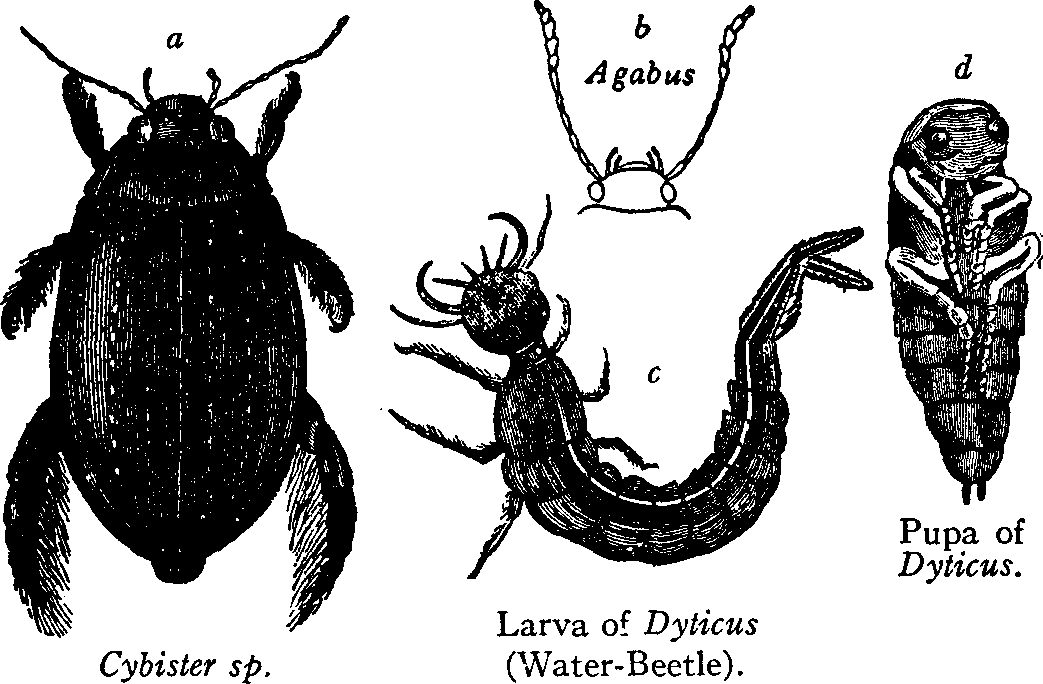
Water Beetles (Dytiscidae). a, Beetle (Cybister sp.); b, head of beetle with feelers and palps (Agabus); c, larva (Larva of Dytiscus, Water Beetle); d, pupa (Pupa of Dytiscus).

A water beetle is a generalized name for any beetle that is adapted to living in water at any point in its life cycle. Most water beetles can only live in fresh water, with a few marine species that live in the intertidal zone or littoral zone. There are approximately 2000 species of true water beetles native to lands throughout the world.

Many water beetles carry an air bubble, called the elytra cavity, underneath their abdomens, which provides an air supply, and prevents water from getting into the spiracles. Others have the surface of their exoskeleton modified to form a plastron, or "physical gill", which permits direct gas exchange with the water. Some families of water beetles have fringed hind legs adapted for swimming, but most do not. Most families of water beetles have larvae that are also aquatic; many have aquatic larvae and terrestrial adults.

== Diet ==
Water beetles can be either herbivores, predators, or scavengers. Herbivorous beetles eat only aquatic vegetation, such as algae or leaves. They might also suck juices out the stem of a plant nearby. Scavenger beetles will feed on decomposing organic material that has been deposited. The scavenged material can come from aquatic vegetation, feces, or other small organisms that have died. The great diving beetle, a predator, feeds on things like worms, tadpoles, and even sometimes small fish.

== Species ==
Families in which all species are aquatic in all life stages include:

- Dytiscidae
- Gyrinidae (Whirligig beetles)
- Haliplidae
- Noteridae
- Amphizoidae
- Hygrobiidae (Squeak beetles)
- Meruidae
- Hydroscaphidae (Skiff beetles).

Families in which the adults are not necessarily aquatic include:

- Hydrophilidae
- Lutrochidae (Travertine beetles)
- Dryopidae
- Elmidae
- Eulichadidae
- Heteroceridae
- Limnichidae
- Psephenidae (Water-penny beetles)
- Ptilodactylidae
- Torridincolidae
- Sphaeriusidae

== See also ==
- Aquatic insects
