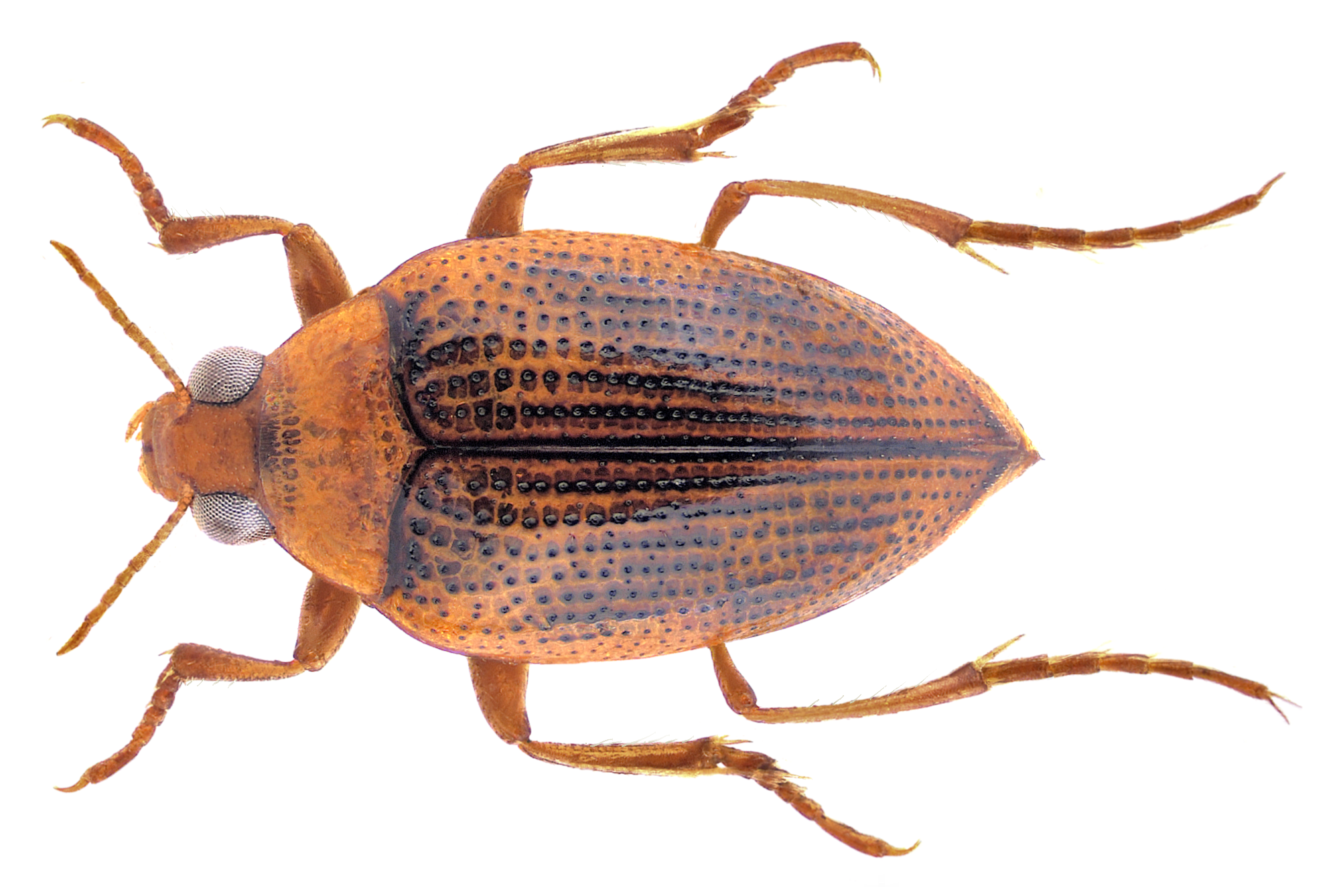
- Haliplus fluviatilis
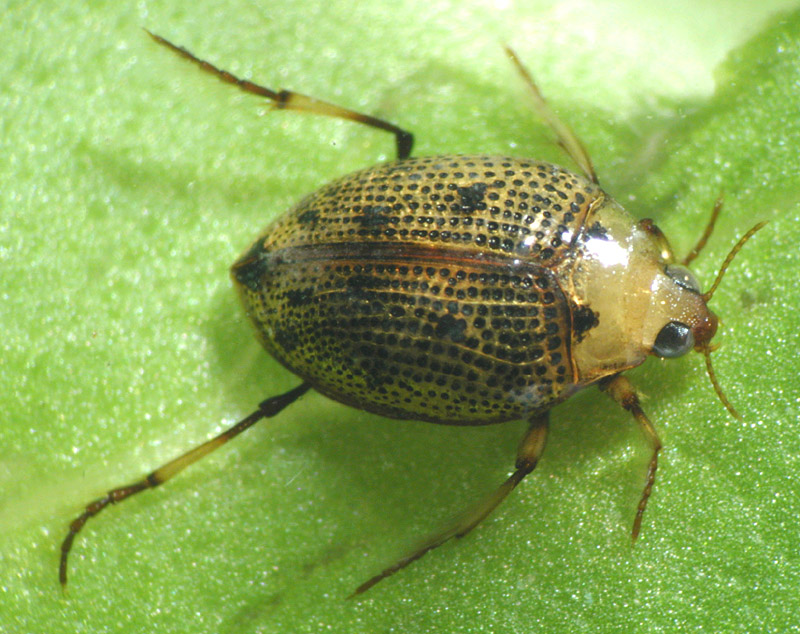
- Peltodytes dispersus

Scientific classification
- Kingdom: Animalia
- Phylum: Arthropoda
- Clade: Pancrustacea
- Class: Insecta
- Order: Coleoptera
- Suborder: Adephaga
- Superfamily: Haliploidea; Aubé, 1836
- Family: Haliplidae; Aubé, 1836

Genera
- Algophilus Zimmerman, 1924; Apteraliplus Chandler, 1943; Brychius Thomson, 1859; Cretihaliplus Ren, Zhu & Lu, 1995; Haliplus Latreille, 1802; Peltodytes Regimbart, 1878

= Haliplidae =

Crawling water beetles

Family of beetles

The Haliplidae are a family of water beetles that swim using an alternating motion of the legs. They are therefore clumsy in water (compared e.g. with the Dytiscidae or Hydrophilidae), and prefer to get around by crawling. The family consists of about 200 species in five genera, distributed wherever there is freshwater habitat; it is the only extant member of superfamily Haliploidea. They are also known as crawling water beetles or haliplids.

== Description ==
The adults of these beetles are generally oval in shape, with a very convex upperside, and are generally 1.5–5.0 mm (0.059–0.197 in) long. They are generally yellowish to light brown in color, frequently with light and dark patterns dotted with 10 or more rows of punctures on the elytra. The family's most distinctive characteristic is the large coxal plates of the hindlegs, which are immobile (though not fused in the centerline) and extend back along the underside to cover most of the abdomen base and the hindleg trochanters and femora. They are used as air storage supplementing the air carried under the elytra.

The compound eyes are markedly protruding from a smallish head, which bears antennae with 11 segments set upon an antennophore with a conspicuously short base (scapus). The extension of the prosternum is broad, with a truncated tip, ending adjacent to the metasternal process. The metasternum has a complete transverse ridge. The slender legs have long swimming hairs on tibiae and tarsi, but are not flattened into "flippers". The foreleg tibiae lack the apparatus for antenna cleaning present in many other beetles. Unlike in other Adephaga, the hindwings are not folded under the elytra, but rolled together apically.

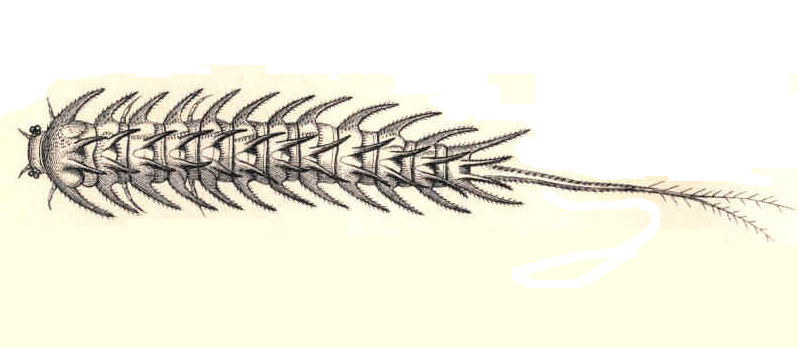
Larva of Haliplus fulvus

Haliplidae larvae have a long and slender body with a tough exoskeleton. They can be recognized by their specialized mouthparts, carried on a small head. The maxillae and labium are adapted to manipulating the algae the larvae feed on, while the mandibles contain a channel through which fluids are sucked out of the food. The larval legs are short and carry a single claw each, but the forelegs have various adaptations for climbing among water plants. Respiration is via gills which are either long and filamentous, or (as in Peltodytes) short microtracheal extensions; they are carried on the tergites of each thoracic segment and all but the ninth or tenth abdominal segment, whichever is terminal. The latter may be absent, but in the larvae of some Haliplidae it is tapering and ends in two prongs (which are not urogomphi though). The last (third) instar has functional spiracles on the mesothorax and the first to seventh abdominal segments.

== Ecology ==
Haliplids live in the aquatic vegetation around the edges of small ponds, lakes, and quiet streams. Adults are omnivorous, eating insect eggs, small crustaceans, hydrozoan polyps, and algae, while the larvae eat only algae. The species of Peltodytes deposit eggs on the surface of aquatic plants, while Haliplus chews out a cavity in the plants for their eggs. There are three instars, and pupation takes place on land in a chamber constructed by the larva.

Crawling water beetles are not extensively studied because their interaction with humans is minimal. Hungerford's crawling water beetle (Brychius hungerfordi) is an endangered species found only in Michigan and Ontario.

== Systematics ==
The classification of haliplids as a separate group of Adephaga is unquestioned, and most entomologists believe they developed from terrestrial beetles separately from other types of water beetles. For many decades, the family was in need of revision, the last general catalog being published by A. Zimmermann in 1920. B. J. van Vondel produced an updated catalogue of the known Haliplidae taxa.

Like predaceous diving beetles (Dytiscidae), the crawling water beetles form an early offshoot of the Adephaga. They still have grooved maxillae and their tentoriolacinial muscle does not attach to the mesal stipial base. Their larvae, like those of predaceous diving beetles, do not possess eggshell-bursters on the head. It is not yet resolved whether Haliplidae and Dytiscidae are closest relatives, or whether they originated independently from the basal Adephaga.

=== Genera ===
The family is not very diverse, with only five genera accepted. Of these, Peltodytes is probably the most ancestral, though it has a number of autapomorphies. The others have more synapomorphies in common; Haliplus is the more diverse and appears to include some minor lineages formerly considered independent genera.
