= Jakob Nikolayevich Popov =

Russian architect

Jakob Nikolayevich Popov (1802 (1798?) - after 1852 (1859?)) was a Russian architect. His most noted work is the Demidovsky Pillar.

He was the son of a chief officer. He studied at the Barnaul Mining School. In April 1816 he began serving at the Kolyvano-Voskresensky factories as a surveyor's apprentice.

In 1820 he was sent to St. Petersburg to study in the architectural class of the Imperial Academy of Arts and was a student of K. I. Rossi. In St Petersburg he participated in the construction of the Mikhailovsky Palace.

In March 1828 he was promoted to master of charge.

In August 1829, Popov returned to Barnaul where he received the position of factory architect. He is credited with creating the ensemble of Demidov Square, transforming Petropavlovskaya Street (now Polzunov) in the forms of classicism, and other works.
