= Nebria schrenkii =

Scientific classification
- Domain: Eukaryota
- Kingdom: Animalia
- Phylum: Arthropoda
- Class: Insecta
- Order: Coleoptera
- Suborder: Adephaga
- Family: Carabidae
- Subfamily: Nebriinae
- Tribe: Nebriini
- Genus: Nebria
- Species: N. schrenkii

Binomial name
- Nebria schrenkii Gebler, 1843

Synonyms
- Nebria schrenckii

Species of beetle

Nebria schrenkii is a species in the beetle family Carabidae. It is found in Kazakhstan and China.
