= Oberea depressa =

Scientific classification
- Domain: Eukaryota
- Kingdom: Animalia
- Phylum: Arthropoda
- Class: Insecta
- Order: Coleoptera
- Suborder: Polyphaga
- Infraorder: Cucujiformia
- Family: Cerambycidae
- Genus: Oberea
- Species: O. depressa

Binomial name
- Oberea depressa Gebler, 1825

Synonyms
- Oberea transbaicalica Suvorov, 1913; Oberea inclusa var. amurica (Suvorov) Breuning, 1962; Oberea amurica Suvorov, 1913; Oberea vittata var. amurica (Suvorov) Plavilstshikov, 1926

Species of beetle

Oberea depressa is a species of beetle in the family Cerambycidae. It was described by Gebler in 1825. It is known from China, Russia and Mongolia.
