= Harpalus rufiscapus =

Scientific classification
- Kingdom: Animalia
- Phylum: Arthropoda
- Class: Insecta
- Order: Coleoptera
- Suborder: Adephaga
- Family: Carabidae
- Genus: Harpalus
- Species: H. rufiscapus

Binomial name
- Harpalus rufiscapus Gebler, 1833

Species of beetle

Harpalus rufiscapus is a species of ground beetle in the subfamily Harpalinae. It was described by Gebler in 1833.
