= Bembidion transparens =

Scientific classification
- Kingdom: Animalia
- Phylum: Arthropoda
- Class: Insecta
- Order: Coleoptera
- Suborder: Adephaga
- Family: Carabidae
- Genus: Bembidion
- Species: B. transparens

Binomial name
- Bembidion transparens (Gebler, 1830)

Species of beetle

Bembidion transparens is a species of ground beetle in the family Carabidae. It is found in North America and Europe.

== Subspecies ==
These three subspecies belong to the species Bembidion transparens:

- Bembidion transparens prostratum (Motschulsky, 1844)
- Bembidion transparens transparens (Gebler, 1830)
- Trepanes transparens transparens (Gebler, 1829)
