= Demidovsky Pillar, Barnaul =

Obelisk in Barnaul, Russia

Coordinates: 53°19′44″N 83°47′04″E

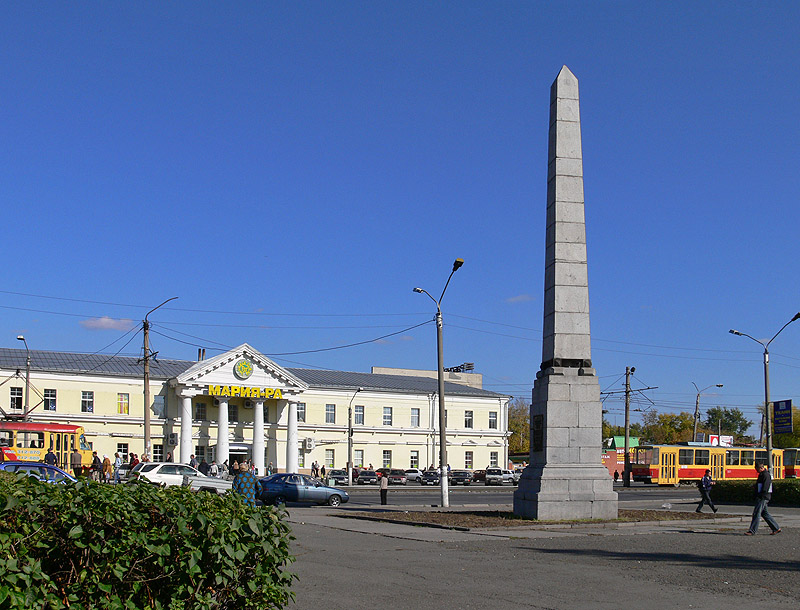
The Demidovsky Pillar

The Demidovsky Pillar is a modern obelisk on Demidov Square in the Central District of Barnaul, Russia. It is a memorial to 100 years of mining in the Altai Krai. It was begun on the initiative of Pyotr Kozmitch Frolov, with the first stone being laid on 18 June 1825 and completed in 1839.

The prototype for the Demidov Pillar was the Rumyantsev Obelisk in honour of the victories of Count PA Rumyantsev, established at the end of the 18th century on Vasilevsky Island in Saint Petersburg. Initial designs for the Demidovsky Pillar were for it to be 21m high (close to the height of the Rumyantsev Obelisk), but during construction under architect Jakob Nikolayevich Popov the height was significantly reduced, to 14m. It is made of 12 grey granite blocks, cut and processed in the Kolyvanskoy township and floated down the Tcharych and Ob to Barnaul on rafts. The base rests on four iron pillars underpinning the granite pedestal, and on that pedestal is a cast bronze plaque reading:

centenary of the Kolyvano Bockreseskex plants, in the reign of Alexander I, the summer of 1825. Entered the property of Her Imperial Majesty in the reign of Empress Elizabeth in 1747.

Also on the pedestal was a cast-iron oval bas-relief with a portrait of Akinfiy Demidov produced at the Guriev plant.

In 1918 it was decided to dismantle and re-locate the obelisk as a monument to those who had died for the Revolution. Molten lead was poured between the granite slabs and there were attempts to scratch out the inscription, but it proved impossible to move it and it remains on its original site, though in the 1920s the authorities were able to remove the original memorial plaques. The bas-relief of Demidov passed to the Regional Museum as a model of artistic casting. The inscription plaque was replaced in 1949 with one reading:

Monument to a century of mining production in the Altai (1725–1825). Erected on the proposal of PK Frolov in the years 1831–1939. Protected by the state.
