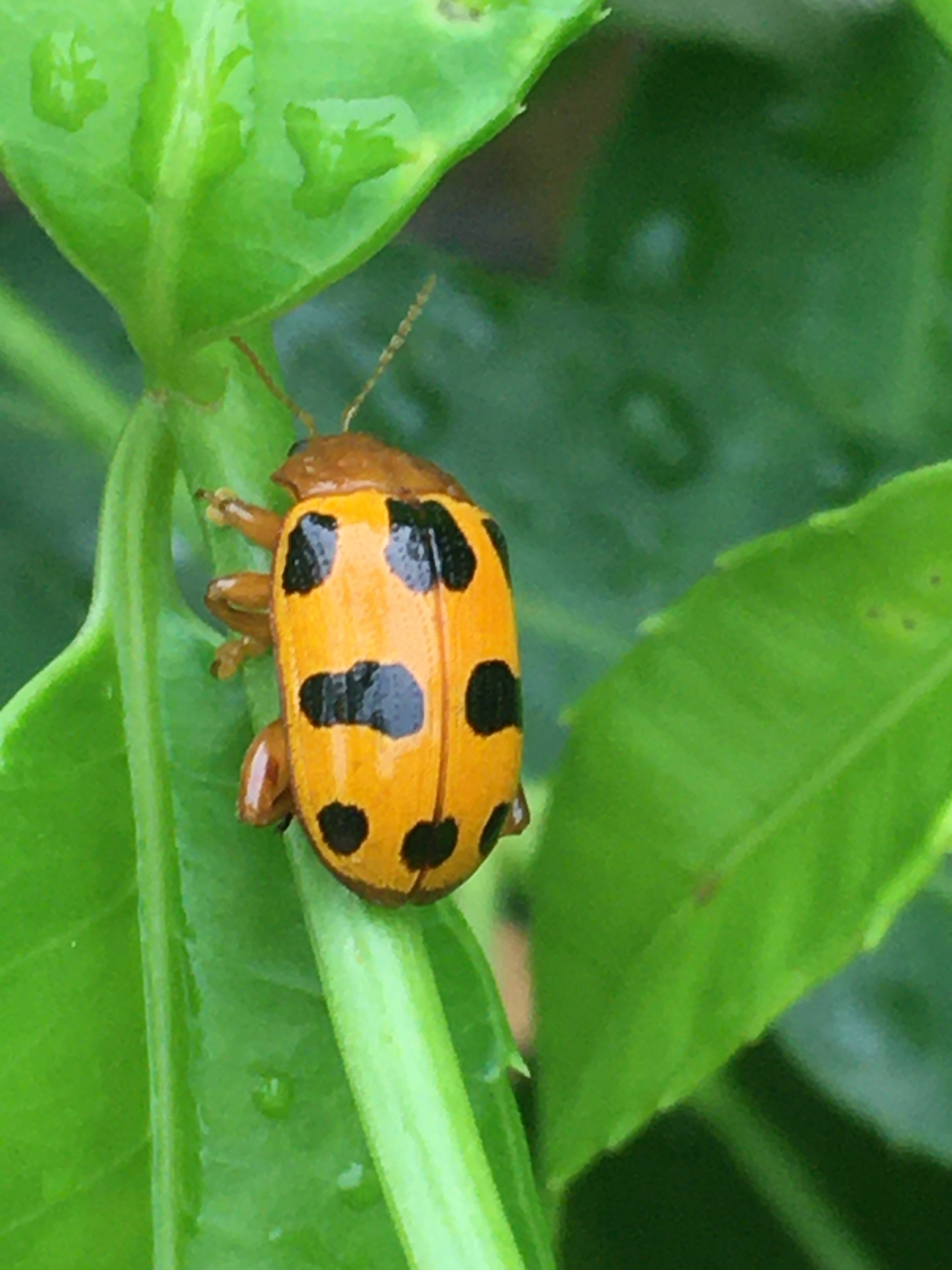
- Podontia affinis indosinensis

Scientific classification
- Kingdom: Animalia
- Phylum: Arthropoda
- Clade: Pancrustacea
- Class: Insecta
- Order: Coleoptera
- Suborder: Polyphaga
- Infraorder: Cucujiformia
- Family: Chrysomelidae
- Tribe: Alticini
- Genus: Podontia; Dalman, 1824

Type species
- Galleruca grandis (= Chrysomela lutea Olivier, 1790) Gröndal, 1808

Synonyms
- Paramerista Lopatin, 2011; Pododontia Agassiz, 1846

= Podontia =

Genus of flea beetles

Podontia is a genus of flea beetles in the family Chrysomelidae. They belong in the Blepharida-group of flea beetles.

== Description ==
They are one of the largest representatives of flea beetles and with Podontia lutea adults being around 2 centimeters long, it is reputed that it is the largest flea beetle species in the world. They are distinguished from other genera in the Blepharida-group by their bifurcate prosternum, saddle-shaped mesosternum and strongly inwardly curved bifid tarsal claws.

== Larval defense ==
In Podontia (along with some other related genera) larvae retain their feces directly on the dorsum (upside). This coating acts as a deterrent from predators such as ants. The fecal coat may also possibly serve to moderate body temperature or to reduce water loss although it has not been proven yet.

== Species ==
Species include:

- Podontia affinis (Gröndal, 1808)
- Podontia congregata Baly, 1865
- Podontia dalmani Baly, 1865
- Podontia flava Baly, 1865
- Podontia jalur Mohamedsaid, 1989
- Podontia laosensis Scherer, 1969
- Podontia lutea (Olivier, 1790)
- Podontia quatuordecimpunctata (Linnaeus, 1767)
- Podontia rufocastanea Baly, 1865

Former species:

- Podontia basalis Baly, 1862: moved to Neoblepharella (formerly Blepharella)
- Podontia evanida Baly, 1865 moved to Calotheca
- Podontia marmorata Baly, 1865 moved to Calotheca
- Podontia nigrotessellata Baly, 1865 moved to Calotheca
- Podontia pitalohita (Maulik, 1926): synonym of Podontia rufocastanea Baly, 1865
- Podontia reticulata Baly, 1865 moved to Calotheca
- Podontia sacra Baly, 1865 moved to Calotheca
- Podontia soriculata (Swartz, 1808): moved to Paropsides
- Podontia vittata Baly, 1862: moved to Calotheca

== See also ==
- List of flea beetle genera
