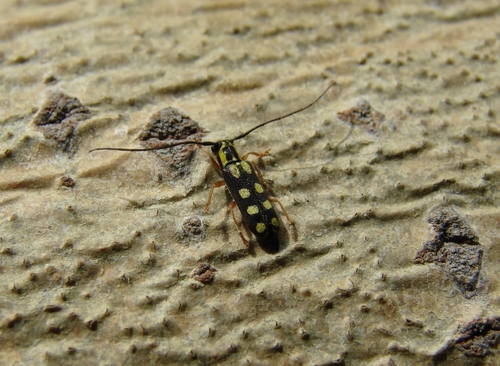

Scientific classification
- Domain: Eukaryota
- Kingdom: Animalia
- Phylum: Arthropoda
- Class: Insecta
- Order: Coleoptera
- Suborder: Polyphaga
- Infraorder: Cucujiformia
- Family: Cerambycidae
- Genus: Menesia
- Species: M. sulphurata

Binomial name
- Menesia sulphurata (Gebler, 1825)

Synonyms
- Tetrops sulphurata (Gebler) Kraatz, 1879; Praolia yuasai Gressitt, 1935; Menesia yuasai (Gressitt); Saperda sulphurata Gebler, 1825

= Menesia sulphurata =

Species of beetle

Menesia sulphurata is a species of beetle in the family Cerambycidae. It was described by Gebler in 1825, originally under the genus Saperda. It is known from Mongolia, Kazakhstan, Japan, China, and Russia.

== Varietas ==
- Menesia sulphurata var. gifuensis Breuning, 1954
- Menesia sulphurata var. bipustulata Plavilstshikov, 1927
- Menesia sulphurata var. flavotecta Heyden, 1886
- Menesia sulphurata var. semivittata Pic, 1915
- Menesia sulphurata var. nigrocincta Pic, 1915
