= Timeline of Barnaul =

The following is a timeline of the history of the city of Barnaul, Russia.

== 18th–19th centuries ==
- 1730 – Akinfiy Demidov brought 200 peasants to build the plant (accepted date for the foundation of Barnaul).
- 1746 – the first mention of the first street of the future city (Ryapasovskaya or Ryaposovskaya).
- 1839 – Demidovsky Pillar was installed.

== 20th century ==
- 12 August 1917 – The first issue of the Bolshevik newspaper Golos Truda, the predecessor of the regional newspaper Altayskaya Pravda (renamed in 1937), is published in Barnaul.
- 1933 – Barnaul Teachers Institute founded.
- November 1941 – Polish diplomatic post established.
- 1942
  - Altai State Technical University established.
  - 13 July – Staff of the Polish diplomatic post arrested by the Russians; post shut down and its documents and seals seized by the Russians.
- 1954 – Altai State Medical Institute founded.
- 1956 – Barnaul Music School established.
- 1958 – Siberian Research Institute of Cheesemaking founded.
- 1973 – Altai State University established.
- 1987 – Institute for Water and Environmental Problems AS USSR formed.
- 13 January 1993 – Vecherny Barnaul newspaper begins publication.

== 21st century ==
- 2010 – Barnaul Zoo opens.
- 2020 – Barnaul basketball club founded.
