= Bembidion petrosum =

Scientific classification
- Kingdom: Animalia
- Phylum: Arthropoda
- Class: Insecta
- Order: Coleoptera
- Suborder: Adephaga
- Family: Carabidae
- Genus: Bembidion
- Species: B. petrosum

Binomial name
- Bembidion petrosum Gebler, 1833

Species of beetle

Bembidion petrosum is a species of ground beetle in the family Carabidae. It is found in North America, Europe, and temperate Asia. The species breeds in the summer and hibernates as an overwintering strategy. They are often found in riparian habitats, aggregating beneath stones.

== Subspecies ==
These four subspecies belong to the species Bembidion petrosum:

- Bembidion petrosum attuense Lindroth, 1963
- Bembidion petrosum carlhlindrothi Kangas, 1980
- Bembidion petrosum petrosum Gebler, 1833
- Bembidion petrosum siebkei Sparre-Schneider, 1910
