= Menesia transversenotata =

Scientific classification
- Domain: Eukaryota
- Kingdom: Animalia
- Phylum: Arthropoda
- Class: Insecta
- Order: Coleoptera
- Suborder: Polyphaga
- Infraorder: Cucujiformia
- Family: Cerambycidae
- Genus: Menesia
- Species: M. transversenotata

Binomial name
- Menesia transversenotata (Heller, 1924)

Synonyms
- Daphisia leopoldi Fisher, 1934

Species of beetle

Menesia transversenotata is a species of beetle in the family Cerambycidae. It was described by Heller in 1924. It is known from the Philippines.
