= Menesia calliope =

Scientific classification
- Kingdom: Animalia
- Phylum: Arthropoda
- Clade: Pancrustacea
- Class: Insecta
- Order: Coleoptera
- Suborder: Polyphaga
- Infraorder: Cucujiformia
- Family: Cerambycidae
- Genus: Menesia
- Species: M. calliope

Binomial name
- Menesia calliope (Thomson, 1879)

Synonyms
- Glenea calliope Thomson, 1879

Species of beetle

Menesia calliope is a species of beetle in the family Cerambycidae. It was described by James Thomson in 1879. It is known from Malaysia.
