= Menesia bicoloricornis =

Scientific classification
- Kingdom: Animalia
- Phylum: Arthropoda
- Class: Insecta
- Order: Coleoptera
- Suborder: Polyphaga
- Infraorder: Cucujiformia
- Family: Cerambycidae
- Genus: Menesia
- Species: M. bicoloricornis

Binomial name
- Menesia bicoloricornis Breuning, 1963

Species of beetle

Menesia bicoloricornis is a species of beetle in the family Cerambycidae. It was described by Stephan von Breuning in 1963. It is known from Sumatra.
