= Menesia albifrons =

Scientific classification
- Domain: Eukaryota
- Kingdom: Animalia
- Phylum: Arthropoda
- Class: Insecta
- Order: Coleoptera
- Suborder: Polyphaga
- Infraorder: Cucujiformia
- Family: Cerambycidae
- Genus: Menesia
- Species: M. albifrons

Binomial name
- Menesia albifrons Heyden, 1886

Species of beetle

Menesia albifrons is a species of beetle in the family Cerambycidae. It was described by Heyden in 1886. It is known from Russia.
