= Menesia immaculipennis =

Scientific classification
- Kingdom: Animalia
- Phylum: Arthropoda
- Class: Insecta
- Order: Coleoptera
- Suborder: Polyphaga
- Infraorder: Cucujiformia
- Family: Cerambycidae
- Genus: Menesia
- Species: M. immaculipennis

Binomial name
- Menesia immaculipennis Breuning, 1954

Synonyms
- Menesia immaculata Gressitt, 1945 nec Aurivillius, 1926

Species of beetle

Menesia immaculipennis is a species of beetle in the family Cerambycidae. It was described by Stephan von Breuning in 1954.
