= Menesia vittata =

Scientific classification
- Kingdom: Animalia
- Phylum: Arthropoda
- Class: Insecta
- Order: Coleoptera
- Suborder: Polyphaga
- Infraorder: Cucujiformia
- Family: Cerambycidae
- Genus: Menesia
- Species: M. vittata

Binomial name
- Menesia vittata (Aurivillius, 1920)

Synonyms
- Daphisia vittata Aurivillius, 1920

Species of beetle

Menesia vittata is a species of beetle in the family Cerambycidae. It was described by Per Olof Christopher Aurivillius in 1920. It is known from Borneo.
