= Menesia discimaculata =

Scientific classification
- Domain: Eukaryota
- Kingdom: Animalia
- Phylum: Arthropoda
- Class: Insecta
- Order: Coleoptera
- Suborder: Polyphaga
- Infraorder: Cucujiformia
- Family: Cerambycidae
- Genus: Menesia
- Species: M. discimaculata

Binomial name
- Menesia discimaculata (Aurivillius, 1923)

Synonyms
- Daphisia discimaculata Aurivillius, 1923

Species of beetle

Menesia discimaculata is a species of beetle in the family Cerambycidae. It was described by Per Olof Christopher Aurivillius in 1923, originally under the genus Daphisia.
