= Nagorny Park =

Park in Barnaul, Altai Krai, Russia

Coordinates: 53°18′50″N 83°47′20″E

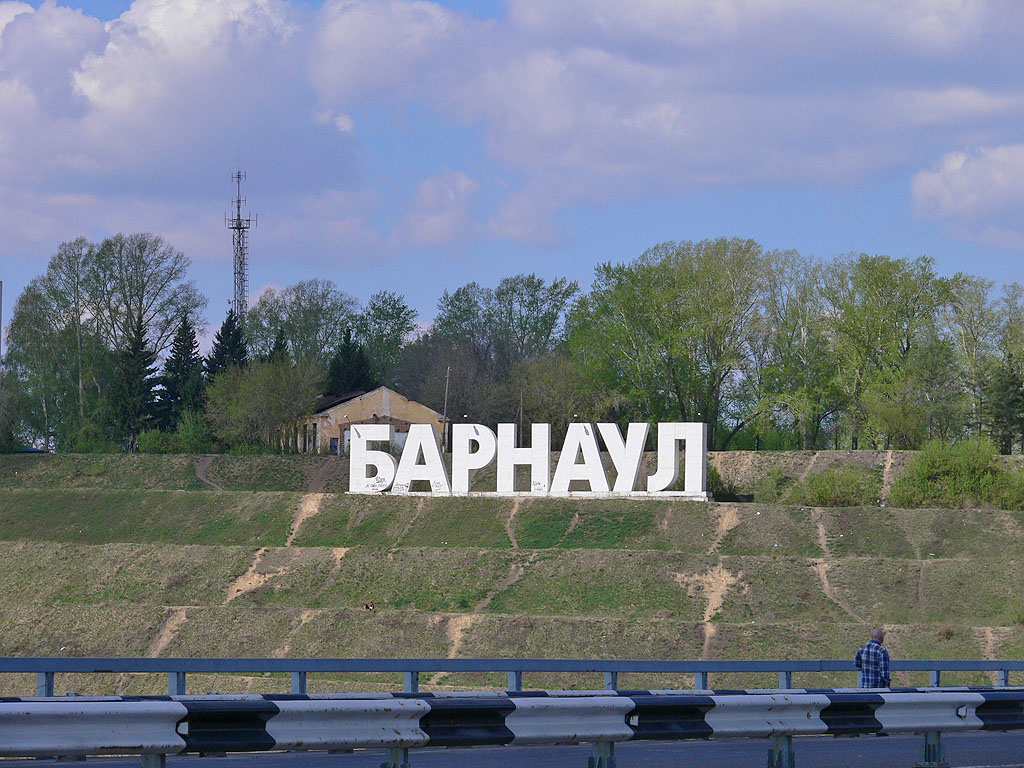
Letters "Barnaul" at Nagorny Park

Nagorny Park (Russian: Нагорный парк) — is the oldest park in Barnaul, Altai Krai, Russia.

The park opened in 1993 and is located at Central District of Barnaul. The park was created by the memorial zone of the Barnaul history.

== History ==
The park was founded by A. Demidov in 1772 as Nagorny cemetery, where famous people of Barnaul were buried.

From 1956 to 1993, the Altai VDNH was located here.
