= Menesia shelfordi =

Scientific classification
- Kingdom: Animalia
- Phylum: Arthropoda
- Clade: Pancrustacea
- Class: Insecta
- Order: Coleoptera
- Suborder: Polyphaga
- Infraorder: Cucujiformia
- Family: Cerambycidae
- Genus: Menesia
- Species: M. shelfordi

Binomial name
- Menesia shelfordi (Aurivillius, 1923)

Synonyms
- Daphisia shelfordi Aurivillius, 1923

Species of beetle

Menesia shelfordi is a species of longhorn beetle in the family Cerambycidae. It was described by Per Olof Christopher Aurivillius in 1923. It is known from Borneo.
