= Valery Kopytov =

Russian serial killer (born 1971)

- Валерий Копытов
- Born: Valery Kopytov; 1971 (age 54–55)
- Other name: "Barnaul Chikatilo"
- Convictions: Murder (19 counts); Robbery
- Penalty: 25 years imprisonment

Details
- Victims: 19
- Span of crimes: 2000–2004
- Country: Russia
- State: Altai
- Date apprehended: 2005

Valery Kopytov (Russian: Валерий Копытов; born 1971), nicknamed the Barnaul Chikatilo (Russian: Барнаульский Чикатило), is a Russian serial killer who murdered 19 homeless people in Altai Krai between 2000 and 2004.

== Early life ==
In 1998, 27-year-old Kopytov was released from prison after serving a sentence for mercenary crimes. After his release, he moved in with his father in Barnaul and failed to find friends or employment. Dissatisfied with his life, he left home and built a dugout beneath the New Bridge beside the Ob River.

== Crimes ==
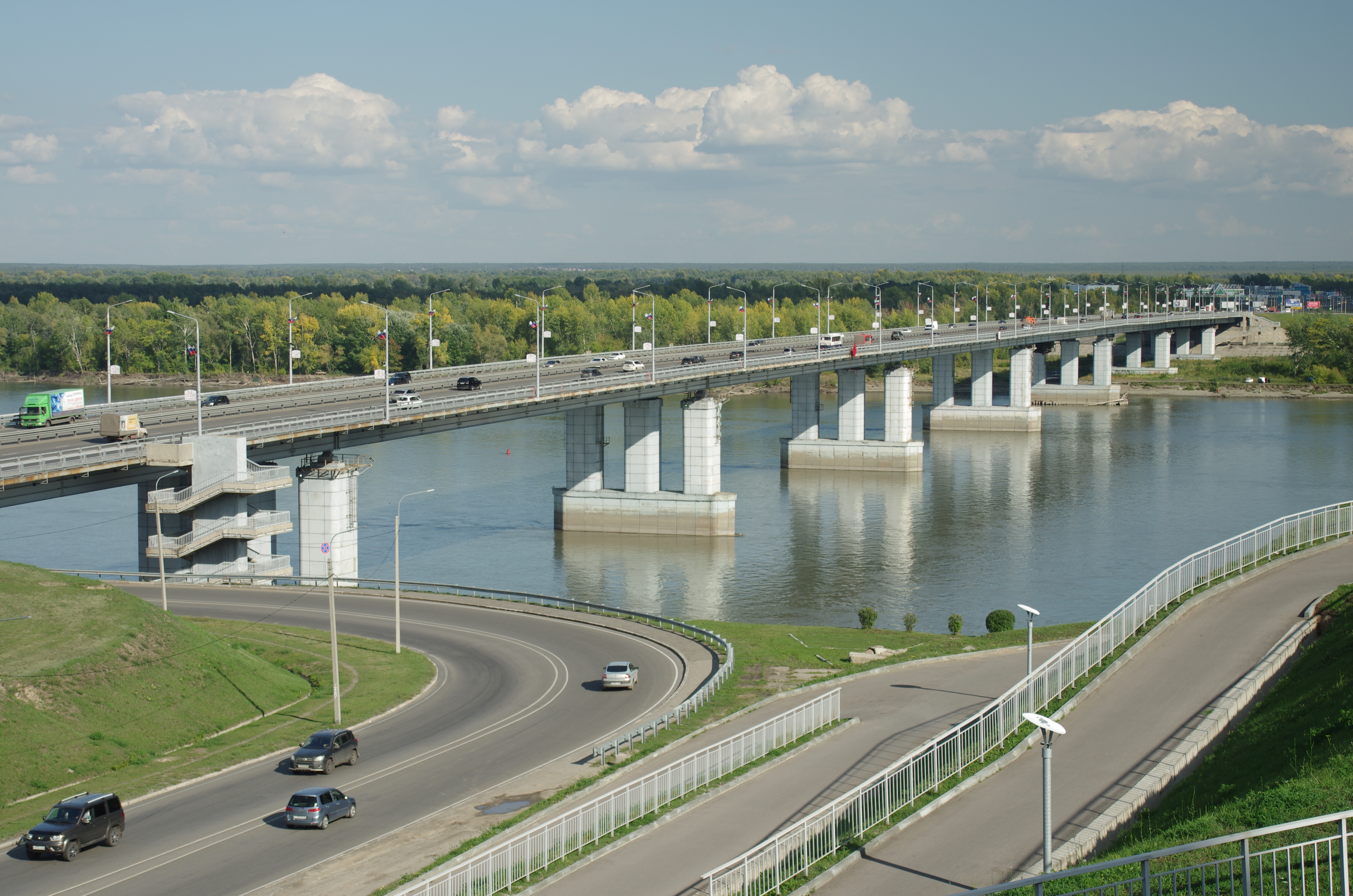
The New Bridge in Barnaul, where Kopytov lived and thirteen of his victims were found buried

In 2004 or 2005, investigators discovered 13 corpses buried in the vicinity of the New Bridge. Later, they were led to Valery Kopytov, after a friend reported him to the police after he told him of his crimes. Kopytov was arrested and led investigators to an additional six bodies buried around the cities of Novoaltaysk, Zarinsk, and Biysk. His victims were stabbed or beaten to death with heavy objects.

Kopytov told investigators that most of the victims were fellow homeless people with whom he got into quarrels, while some others he killed to steal their belongings. Due to his cooperation with law enforcement, he avoided a life sentence, instead receiving 25 years in prison—10 to be spent in prison and 15 in a special regime colony. An accomplice in one of the murders, Yuri Malygin, was sentenced to 11 years in a maximum-security prison.

== See also ==
- List of Russian serial killers
- List of serial killers by number of victims
