= Demidov Square =

Square in Barnaul, Russia

Coordinates: 53.3287°N 83.7841°E

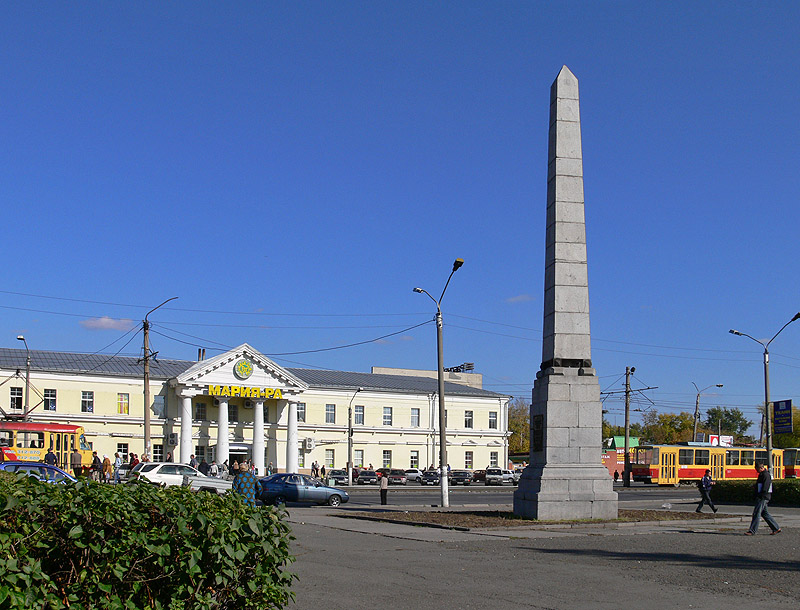
The Demidovsky Pillar in Demidov Square

Demidov Square (Russian - Демидовская площадь) is a square in the Tsentralny City District of Barnaul in Russia, named after the Demidov dynasty. It is the site of the Demidovsky Pillar.
