= Menesia walshae =

Scientific classification
- Kingdom: Animalia
- Phylum: Arthropoda
- Clade: Pancrustacea
- Class: Insecta
- Order: Coleoptera
- Suborder: Polyphaga
- Infraorder: Cucujiformia
- Family: Cerambycidae
- Genus: Menesia
- Species: M. walshae

Binomial name
- Menesia walshae Breuning, 1960

Synonyms
- Menesia walshae m. fuscipes Breuning, 1960

Species of beetle

Menesia walshae is a species of beetle in the family Cerambycidae. It was described by Stephan von Breuning in 1960. It is known from Java.
