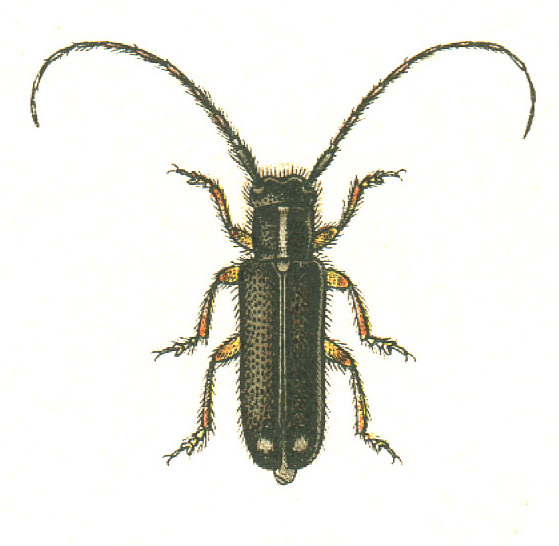

Scientific classification
- Domain: Eukaryota
- Kingdom: Animalia
- Phylum: Arthropoda
- Class: Insecta
- Order: Coleoptera
- Suborder: Polyphaga
- Infraorder: Cucujiformia
- Family: Cerambycidae
- Genus: Menesia
- Species: M. bipunctata

Binomial name
- Menesia bipunctata (Zoubkov, 1829)

Synonyms
- Saperda bipunctata Zoubkoff, 1829 nec Creuzer, 1796; Saperda biguttata Redtenbacher, 1842; Saperda trimaculata Kugelann, 1857; Polyopsis bipunctata (Zoubkoff) Germar, 1844

= Menesia bipunctata =

Species of beetle

Menesia bipunctata is a species of beetle in the family Cerambycidae. It was described by Zoubkov in 1829, originally under the genus Saperda. It has a wide distribution in Europe and Asia. It measures between 6 and 9 mm (0.24 and 0.35 in). It feeds on Juglans regia and Frangula alnus.

== Varietas ==
- Menesia bipunctata var. quadripustulata Mulsant, 1863
- Menesia bipunctata var. perrisi Mulsant, 1856
