= Menesia sexvittata =

Scientific classification
- Kingdom: Animalia
- Phylum: Arthropoda
- Clade: Pancrustacea
- Class: Insecta
- Order: Coleoptera
- Suborder: Polyphaga
- Infraorder: Cucujiformia
- Family: Cerambycidae
- Genus: Menesia
- Species: M. sexvittata

Binomial name
- Menesia sexvittata Breuning, 1962

Species of beetle

Menesia sexvittata is a species of beetle in the family Cerambycidae. It was described by Stephan von Breuning in 1962. It is known from Java.
