= Menesia bimaculata =

Scientific classification
- Kingdom: Animalia
- Phylum: Arthropoda
- Class: Insecta
- Order: Coleoptera
- Suborder: Polyphaga
- Infraorder: Cucujiformia
- Family: Cerambycidae
- Genus: Menesia
- Species: M. bimaculata

Binomial name
- Menesia bimaculata Breuning, 1954

Synonyms
- Daphisia biguttata Aurivillius, 1925; Menesia latevitticollis Breuning, 1954; Menesia prolongatevittata Breuning, 1954

Species of beetle

Menesia bimaculata is a species of beetle in the family Cerambycidae. It was described by Stephan von Breuning in 1954. It is known from Borneo.
