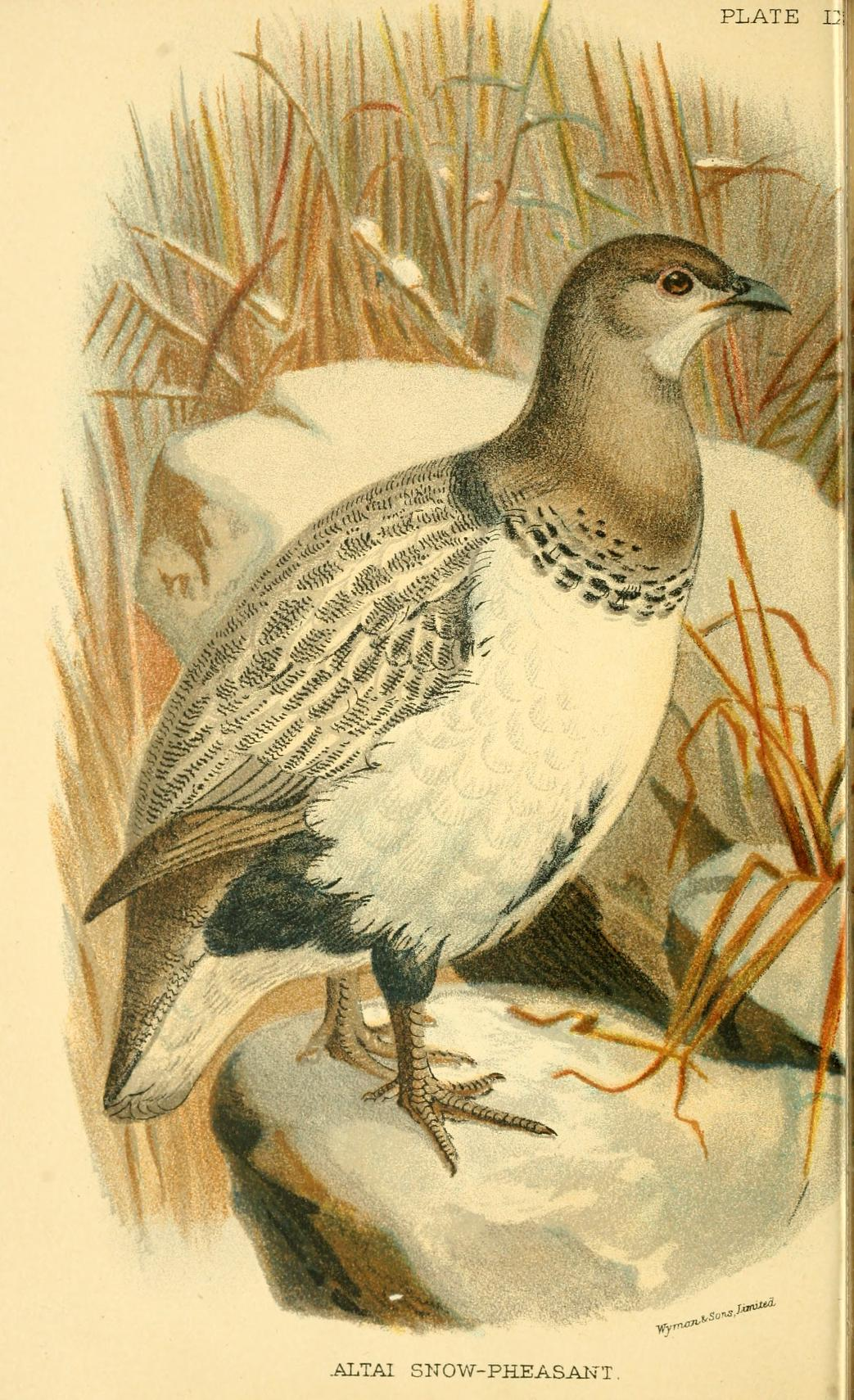

Conservation status
- Least Concern (IUCN 3.1)

Scientific classification
- Kingdom: Animalia
- Phylum: Chordata
- Class: Aves
- Order: Galliformes
- Family: Phasianidae
- Genus: Tetraogallus
- Species: T. altaicus

Binomial name
- Tetraogallus altaicus (Gebler, 1836)

Synonyms
- Perdix altaica Gebler,1836

= Altai snowcock =

Species of bird

The Altai snowcock (Tetraogallus altaicus) is a species of bird in the family Phasianidae. It is found in western Mongolia and adjacent areas of China, Kazakhstan and Russia. Its natural habitat is boreal forests.

== Taxonomy ==
The Altai snowcock was first described by Frederic Gebler in 1836. He was a doctor and naturalist who lived in the Altai region for forty years and named many previously unknown species. There are two subspecies, Tetraogallus altaicus altaicus and Tetraogallus altaicus orientalis.

== Description ==
The Altai snowcock is a plump, partridge-like bird. While most snowcocks are similar in size, the Altai might be the largest species with a length of around 57 to 61 cm (22 to 24 in) and a mean body mass of approximately 2.54 kg (5.6 lb) in females and 3 kg (6.6 lb) in males. The head and neck are slatey-grey and there is a partial dark collar at the base of the neck. The upperparts are grey with white spots and the tail is black. The chin, breast and belly are white. The throat has a breastband of grey with patches of black. The primary and secondary feathers are black, the former having white bases which show as a white flash in flight. The beak is yellowish brown and the legs and feet reddish brown.

== Distribution ==
The Altai snowcock is native to the mountain ranges of western Mongolia and southwestern Siberia. Its range includes in Russia the mountainous regions near Abakan, Sayan Mountains and the Tannu-Ola Mountains; and in Mongolia, the Mongolian Altai, the Govi-Altai, the Khangai Mountains, and the mountains east of Lake Khuvsgul. The habitat is open mountainside above the tree line at altitudes usually ranging between 2,000 and 3,600 metres (6,600 and 11,800 ft).

== Behaviour ==
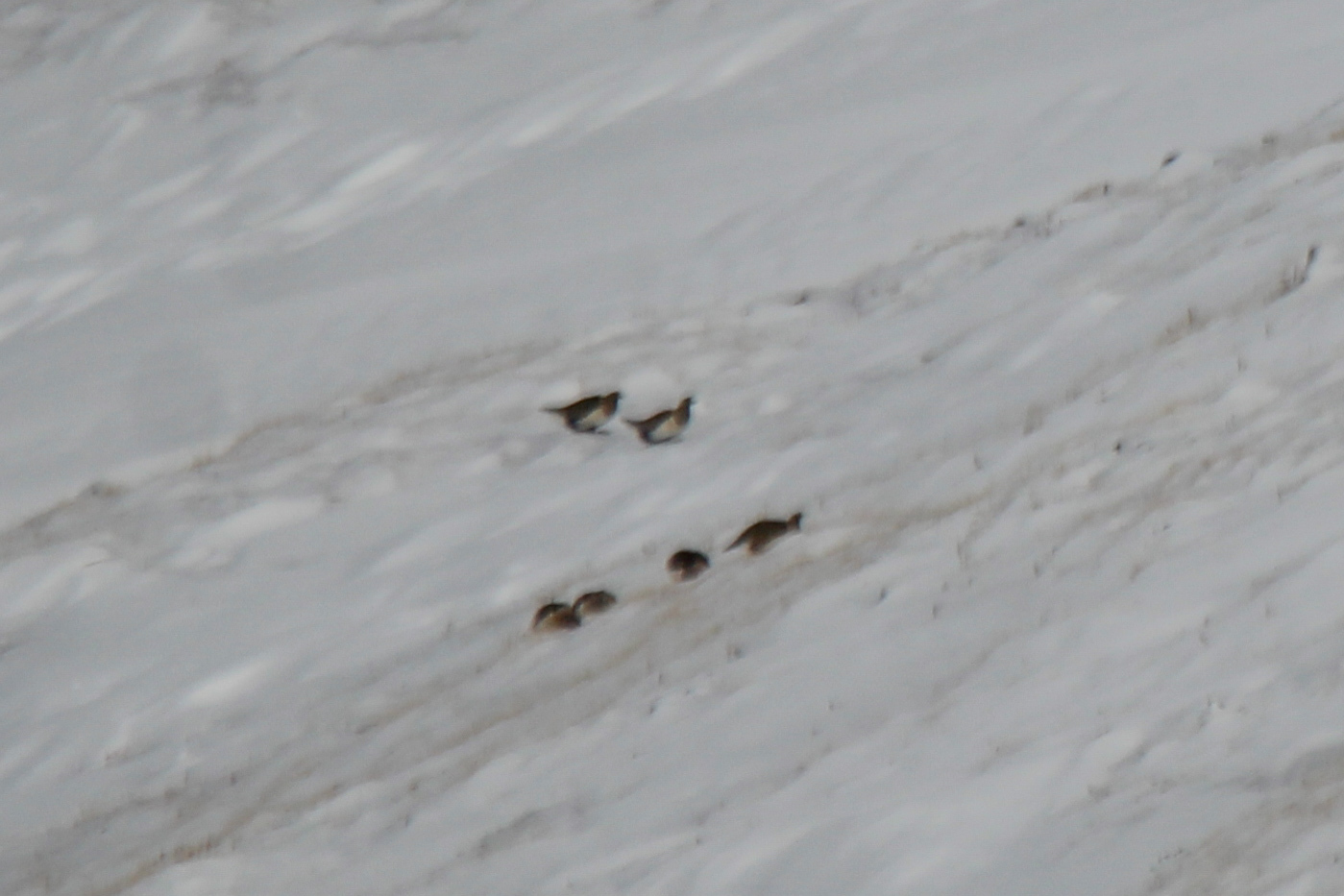
Foraging

The Altai snowcock feeds on buds, shoots, roots, berries and insects and it also occasionally eats small rodents. About forty different species of plants have been recorded to be part of the diet.

== Conservation ==
Populations of Altai snowcock are believed to be decreasing as a result of over-hunting and degradation of their habitat. However, in its Red List of Threatened Species, the IUCN lists this species as being of "Least Concern" because it has a wide distribution over an estimated 819,000 square kilometres (316,000 sq mi) and the number of mature birds is over 10,000 and not decreasing at such a rate as would justify their inclusion in a more vulnerable category.
