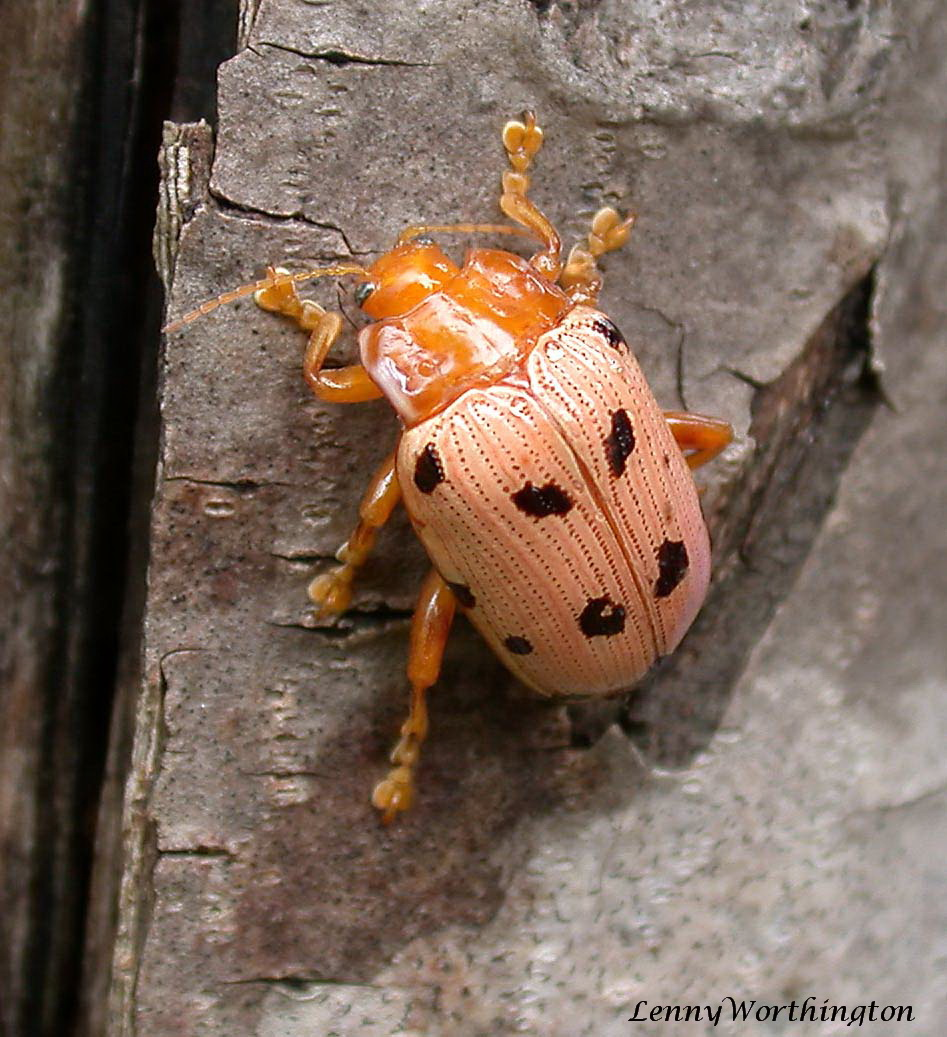

Scientific classification
- Kingdom: Animalia
- Phylum: Arthropoda
- Clade: Pancrustacea
- Class: Insecta
- Order: Coleoptera
- Suborder: Polyphaga
- Infraorder: Cucujiformia
- Family: Chrysomelidae
- Genus: Podontia
- Species: P. quatuordecimpunctata

Binomial name
- Podontia quatuordecimpunctata (Linnaeus, 1767)

= Podontia quatuordecimpunctata =

Species of beetle

Podontia quatuordecimpunctata is a species of leaf-beetle found in tropical Asia. It feeds on a range of plants in the family Anacardiaceae, making holes in their leaves, both as larvae and as adults. The larvae form dark black faecal shields to camouflage and protect themselves. The larvae have an elongated telescoping anus that can twist and deposit feces onto protrusions on the terminal abdominal segments. The moulted exuviae may also be carried on the larvae. In the Philippines, they are known to defoliate Spondias purpurea. In India they have been noted on Spondias pinnata. In Malaysia they have been recorded on Spondias dulcis. The eggs are laid on the plant stems mainly on the underside in a cluster of a layer of about 20 eggs with a small number laid atop this layer. The eggs hatch after about a week and the larvae go through 4 instars in 14 to 16 days and pupate for about 2 to 3 days.
