= Menesia transversevittata =

Scientific classification
- Kingdom: Animalia
- Phylum: Arthropoda
- Class: Insecta
- Order: Coleoptera
- Suborder: Polyphaga
- Infraorder: Cucujiformia
- Family: Cerambycidae
- Genus: Menesia
- Species: M. transversevittata

Binomial name
- Menesia transversevittata Breuning, 1954

Species of beetle

Menesia transversevittata is a species of beetle in the family Cerambycidae. It was described by Stephan von Breuning in 1954. It is known from Malaysia.
