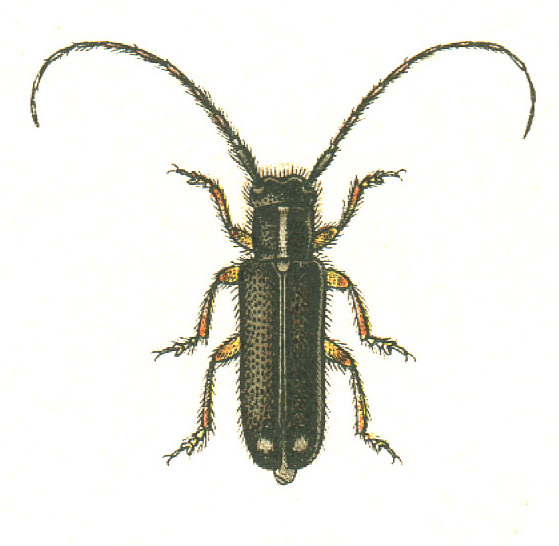
- Menesia bipunctata

Scientific classification
- Kingdom: Animalia
- Phylum: Arthropoda
- Class: Insecta
- Order: Coleoptera
- Suborder: Polyphaga
- Infraorder: Cucujiformia
- Family: Cerambycidae
- Subfamily: Lamiinae
- Tribe: Saperdini
- Genus: Menesia; Mulsant, 1856

= Menesia =

Genus of beetles

Menesia is a genus of longhorn beetles of the subfamily Lamiinae, containing the following species:

subgenus Menesia

- Menesia akemiae Makihara, 1992
- Menesia albifrons Heyden, 1886
- Menesia bicoloricornis Breuning, 1963
- Menesia bimaculata Breuning, 1954
- Menesia bipunctata (Zoubkov, 1829)
- Menesia burmanensis Breuning, 1954
- Menesia calliope (Thomson, 1879)
- Menesia cana (Aurivillius, 1925)
- Menesia clytoides (Gahan, 1912)
- Menesia dallieri Pic, 1926
- Menesia discimaculata (Aurivillius, 1923)
- Menesia eclectica (Pascoe, 1867)
- Menesia fasciolata (Aurivillius, 1922)
- Menesia flavoantennata Breuning, 1954
- Menesia flavotecta Heyden, 1886
- Menesia gleneoides Breuning, 1965
- Menesia guttata (Aurivillius, 1920)
- Menesia immaculipennis Breuning, 1954
- Menesia javanica Breuning, 1954
- Menesia kalshoveni Breuning, 1957
- Menesia laosensis Breuning, 1963
- Menesia latevittata Breuning, 1954
- Menesia longipes Breuning, 1954
- Menesia longitarsis Breuning, 1954
- Menesia makilingi (Heller, 1924)
- Menesia nigra (Aurivillius, 1922)
- Menesia nigriceps (Aurivillius, 1903)
- Menesia nigricornis (Aurivillius, 1913)
- Menesia niveoguttata (Aurivillius, 1925)
- Menesia ochreicollis Breuning, 1954
- Menesia octoguttata Breuning, 1954
- Menesia palliata (Pascoe, 1867)
- Menesia pulchella (Pascoe, 1867)
- Menesia sexvittata Breuning, 1962
- Menesia shelfordi (Aurivillius, 1923)
- Menesia subguttata Breuning, 1954
- Menesia sulphurata (Gebler, 1825)
- Menesia transversenotata (Heller, 1924)
- Menesia transversevittata Breuning, 1954
- Menesia vitiphaga Holzschuh, 2003
- Menesia vittata (Aurivillius, 1920)
- Menesia walshae Breuning, 1960

subgenus Tephrocoma

- Menesia livia (Pascoe, 1867)
