= Menesia vitiphaga =

Scientific classification
- Domain: Eukaryota
- Kingdom: Animalia
- Phylum: Arthropoda
- Class: Insecta
- Order: Coleoptera
- Suborder: Polyphaga
- Infraorder: Cucujiformia
- Family: Cerambycidae
- Genus: Menesia
- Species: M. vitiphaga

Binomial name
- Menesia vitiphaga Holzschuh, 2003

Species of beetle

Menesia vitiphaga is a species of beetle in the family Cerambycidae. It was described by Holzschuh in 2003. It is known from China.
