= Menesia nigra =

Scientific classification
- Kingdom: Animalia
- Phylum: Arthropoda
- Class: Insecta
- Order: Coleoptera
- Suborder: Polyphaga
- Infraorder: Cucujiformia
- Family: Cerambycidae
- Genus: Menesia
- Species: M. nigra

Binomial name
- Menesia nigra (Aurivillius, 1922)

Synonyms
- Daphisia nigra Aurivillius, 1922

Species of beetle

Menesia nigra is a species of beetle in the family Cerambycidae. It was described by Per Olof Christopher Aurivillius in 1922. It is known from Borneo.
