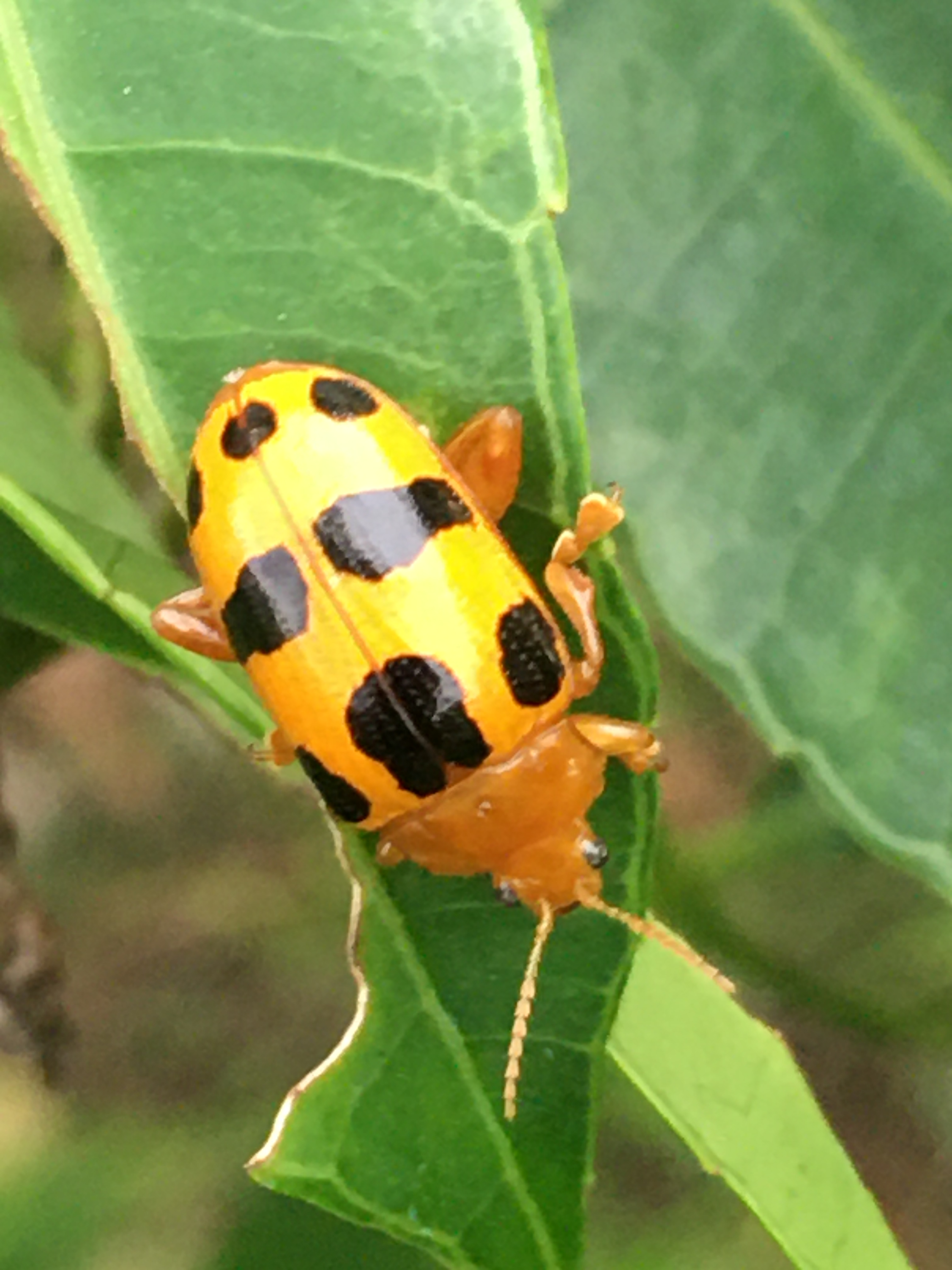
- Podontia affinis indosinensis

Scientific classification
- Kingdom: Animalia
- Phylum: Arthropoda
- Clade: Pancrustacea
- Class: Insecta
- Order: Coleoptera
- Suborder: Polyphaga
- Infraorder: Cucujiformia
- Family: Chrysomelidae
- Tribe: Alticini
- Genus: Podontia
- Species: P. affinis

Binomial name
- Podontia affinis (Gröndal, 1808)

Synonyms
- Galleruca affinis Gröndal, 1808; Podontia impressicollis Sturm, 1826

= Podontia affinis =

Species of flea beetle

Podontia affinis is a species of flea beetle in the family Chrysomelidae. It is native to Indo-China, Indonesia, India, Malaysia and Yunnan.

== Description ==
The elytra of Podontia affinis can vary from yellow, red to white. It has ten black spots, often the two spots found in the middle of the elytrons fuse to make a transverse band. There is also a pear shaped spot behind the scutellum. On average they are 10 to 12 mm long and 5.5 to 6 mm wide.

== Host plants ==
Both the larva and adult primarily eat the leaves of Spondias species, but can feed on other types of plants in the family Anacardiaceae and rarely plants in the family Burseraceae.

== Subspecies ==
There are two described subspecies:

- Podontia affinis affinis Gröndal, 1808 (Java)
- Podontia affinis indosinensis Scherer, 1978 (Indo-China, Malaysia)

There is one undescribed subspecies from Uttar Pradesh.
