= Menesia clytoides =

Scientific classification
- Kingdom: Animalia
- Phylum: Arthropoda
- Class: Insecta
- Order: Coleoptera
- Suborder: Polyphaga
- Infraorder: Cucujiformia
- Family: Cerambycidae
- Genus: Menesia
- Species: M. clytoides

Binomial name
- Menesia clytoides (Gahan, 1912)

Synonyms
- Daphicia clytoides Gahan, 1912

Species of beetle

Menesia clytoides is a species of beetle in the family Cerambycidae. It was described by Charles Joseph Gahan in 1912. It is known from Borneo.
