= Menesia octoguttata =

Scientific classification
- Kingdom: Animalia
- Phylum: Arthropoda
- Class: Insecta
- Order: Coleoptera
- Suborder: Polyphaga
- Infraorder: Cucujiformia
- Family: Cerambycidae
- Genus: Menesia
- Species: M. octoguttata

Binomial name
- Menesia octoguttata Breuning, 1954

Species of beetle

Menesia octoguttata is a species of beetle in the family Cerambycidae. It was described by Stephan von Breuning in 1954. It is known from China.
