= Menesia dallieri =

Scientific classification
- Kingdom: Animalia
- Phylum: Arthropoda
- Class: Insecta
- Order: Coleoptera
- Suborder: Polyphaga
- Infraorder: Cucujiformia
- Family: Cerambycidae
- Genus: Menesia
- Species: M. dallieri

Binomial name
- Menesia dallieri Pic, 1926

Species of beetle

Menesia dallieri is a species of beetle in the family Cerambycidae. It was described by Maurice Pic in 1926. It is known from Vietnam.
