= Menesia akemiae =

Scientific classification
- Domain: Eukaryota
- Kingdom: Animalia
- Phylum: Arthropoda
- Class: Insecta
- Order: Coleoptera
- Suborder: Polyphaga
- Infraorder: Cucujiformia
- Family: Cerambycidae
- Genus: Menesia
- Species: M. akemiae

Binomial name
- Menesia akemiae Makihara, 1992

Species of beetle

Menesia akemiae is a species of beetle in the family Cerambycidae. It was described by Hiroshi Makihara in 1992. It is known from Japan.
