= Menesia nigriceps =

Scientific classification
- Domain: Eukaryota
- Kingdom: Animalia
- Phylum: Arthropoda
- Class: Insecta
- Order: Coleoptera
- Suborder: Polyphaga
- Infraorder: Cucujiformia
- Family: Cerambycidae
- Genus: Menesia
- Species: M. nigriceps

Binomial name
- Menesia nigriceps (Aurivillius, 1903)

Synonyms
- Glenea nigriceps Aurivillius, 1903

Species of beetle

Menesia nigriceps is a species of beetle in the family Cerambycidae. It was described by Per Olof Christopher Aurivillius in 1903. It contains the varietas Menesia nigriceps var. inhumeralis.
