= Paropsides calypso =

Scientific classification
- Kingdom: Animalia
- Phylum: Arthropoda
- Clade: Pancrustacea
- Class: Insecta
- Order: Coleoptera
- Suborder: Polyphaga
- Infraorder: Cucujiformia
- Family: Chrysomelidae
- Genus: Paropsides
- Species: P. calypso

Binomial name
- Paropsides calypso (Blackburn, 1898)

Species of leaf beetle

Paropsides calypso is a species of leaf beetle, in the family Chrysomelidae. It is commonly known as the lilly pilly (leaf) beetle or lilli pilli (leaf) beetle.

== Distribution ==
P. calypso is native to the subtropical rainforest of the eastern coast of Australia. It has been introduced to the southwest region of Australia, as well as New Zealand. P. calypso has been recorded in New Zealand since 2020.
