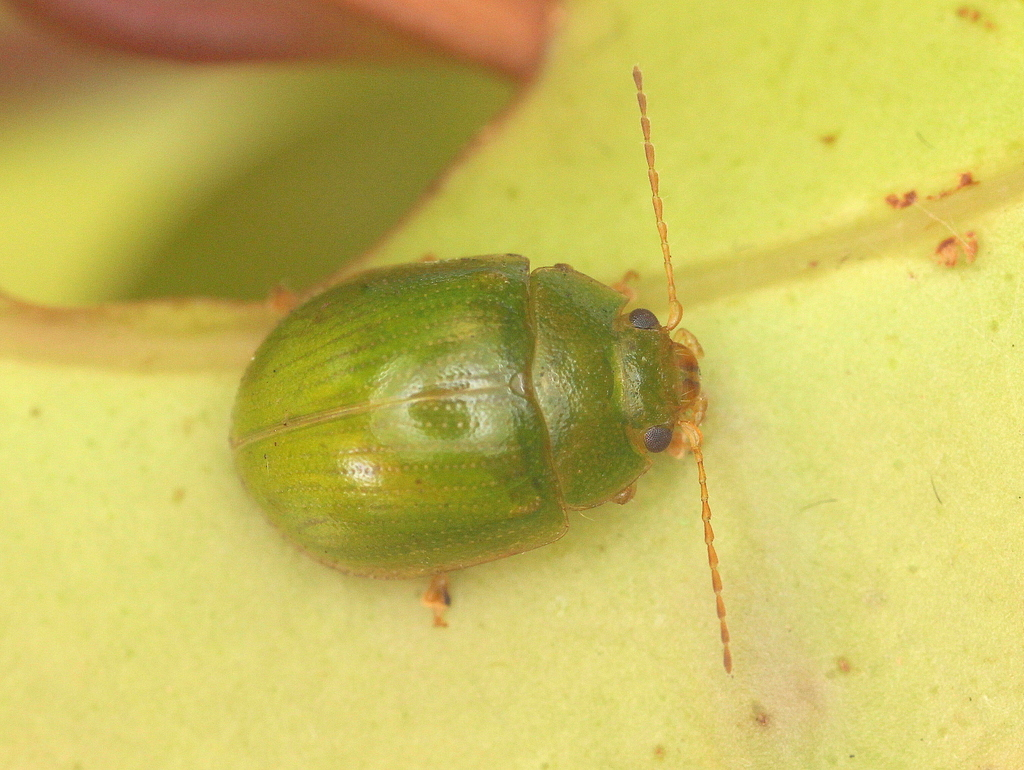
- Paropsides calypso Lillipilli beetle

Scientific classification
- Domain: Eukaryota
- Kingdom: Animalia
- Phylum: Arthropoda
- Class: Insecta
- Order: Coleoptera
- Suborder: Polyphaga
- Infraorder: Cucujiformia
- Family: Chrysomelidae
- Subfamily: Chrysomelinae
- Genus: Paropsides; Motschulsky, 1860

Type species
- Paropsis duodecempustulata (= Chrysomela soriculata Swartz, 1808) Gebler, 1825

Species
- Paropsides allyna; Paropsides apicalis; Paropsides bouvieri; Paropsides calliope; Paropsides calypso; Paropsides catherinae; Paropsides elegans; Paropsides erudita; Paropsides flavomarginata; Paropsides gracilipes; Paropsides hebe; Paropsides monicae; Paropsides nigrofasciata; Paropsides nigrolineata; Paropsides nitidissima; Paropsides opposita; Paropsides pellex; Paropsides polita; Paropsides rufimana; Paropsides s-notata; Paropsides sinuata; Paropsides soriculata; Paropsides tenuicornis; Paropsides umbrosa

= Paropsides =

Genus of leaf beetles

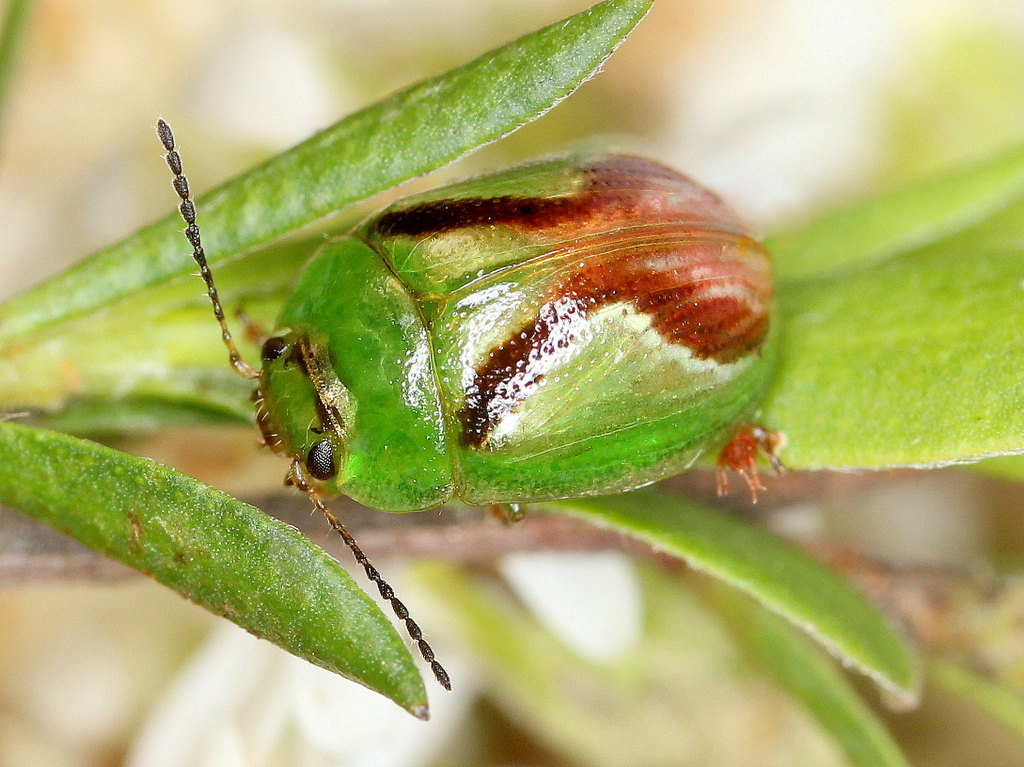
Paropsides opposita

Paropsides is a genus of beetles commonly called leaf beetles and in the subfamily Chrysomelinae. They are distributed from eastern Asia to eastern Australia. Paropsides are small and specialist feeders on native Australian plants. There are 21 species in Australia and they occur mainly on the south-eastern states. The green Paropsides calypso is a native species which commonly attacks the lillipilli genus Syzygium. Paropsides opposita feeds on Tea tree Melaleuca sp.

Paropsides belongs to the Paropsis-group of genera, with similar head, appendages, prosternum, elytra, tarsi and larva. Among these genera it is defined by possession of a single attribute, a full complement of pronotal (thoracic) trichobothria (bristles), which is almost certainly a plesiomorphy. Paropsides is therefore unlikely to be monophyletic.
