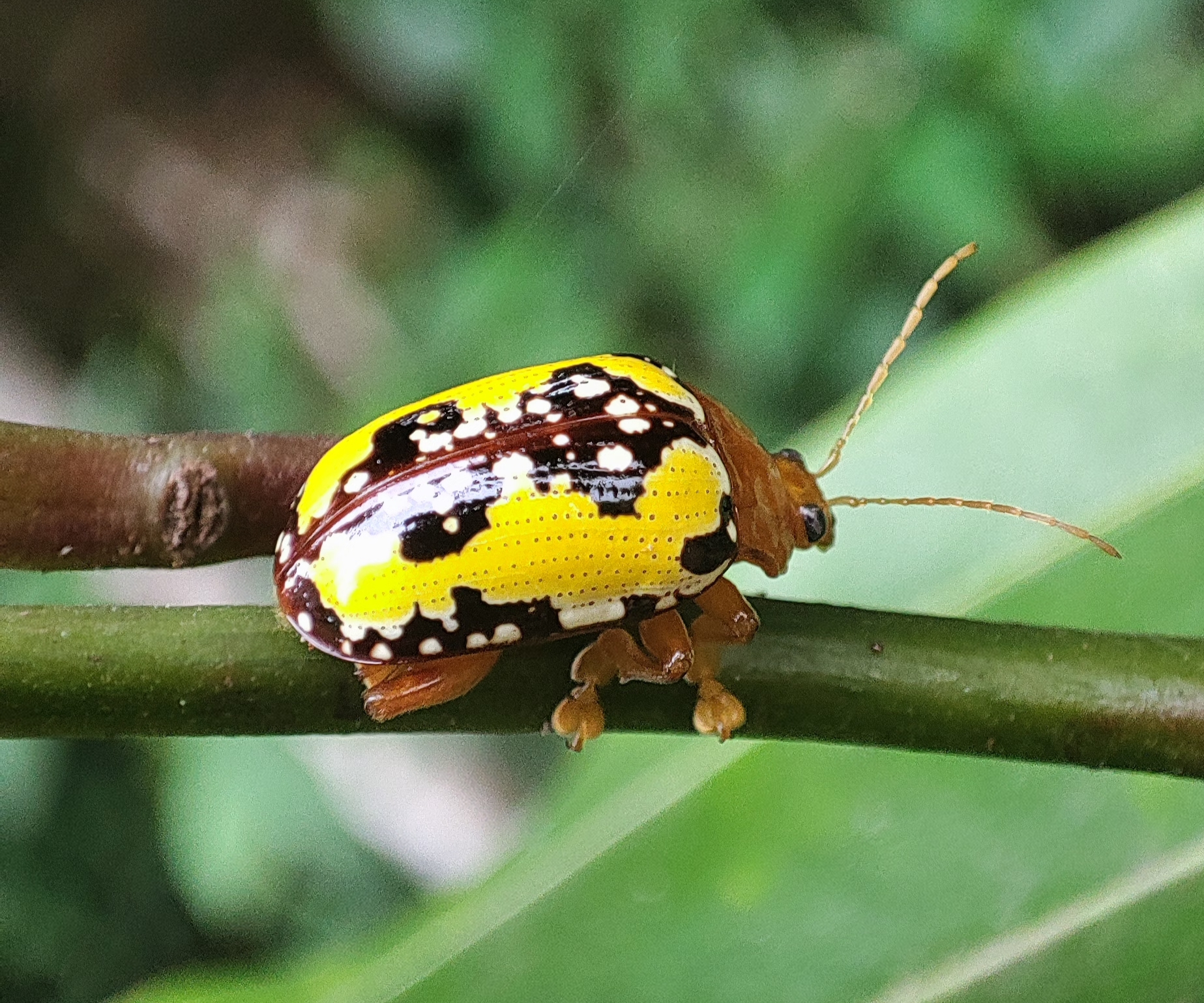

Scientific classification
- Kingdom: Animalia
- Phylum: Arthropoda
- Clade: Pancrustacea
- Class: Insecta
- Order: Coleoptera
- Suborder: Polyphaga
- Infraorder: Cucujiformia
- Family: Chrysomelidae
- Genus: Podontia
- Species: P. congregata

Binomial name
- Podontia congregata Baly, 1865

= Podontia congregata =

Species of beetle

Podontia congregata is a species of flea beetle that is endemic to the Western Ghats. Adults have yellow elytra with black and white markings and the pronotum is orange.

The species was described and given the binomial name by the English entomologist J. S. Baly in 1865 based on a specimen of unknown provenance. Podontia congregata is known to feed on the leaves of Garcinia gummi-gatta. They lay masses of orange eggs on the leaves of the host tree, mostly on the underside of leaves. A species of encyrtid, Ooencyrtus keralensis, is known to parasitize the eggs. The larvae hatch in about a week and feed by scraping the leaf surface initially while later instars cut and feed on the leaf. The larvae cover themselves in their excreta and look like bird dropping. They pupate on the surface of soft soil in about three weeks. The form a mud cocoon around them. The adults emerge after another three weeks, with the entire life span being completed in 49 to 53 days. The adults live for about 3 to 4 months in laboratory conditions. Adults feed on the leaf surface. When disturbed they fall off the leaf and sometimes leap.
