= Tsentralny City District, Barnaul =

District of Barnaul city, Altai Krai, Russia

Coordinates: 53.3333°N 83.7833°E

Tsentralny City District (Russian: Центра́льный райо́н, lit. Central District) is a district of the city of Barnaul, Altai Krai, Russia. Its area is ca. 145 square kilometers (56 sq mi). Population: 91,445 (2010 Census); 86,816 (2002 Census); 86,842 (1989 Soviet census).

== Overview ==
Established on February 7, 1938, it is one of the oldest city districts. It serves as an economic, historical, and transportation core of Barnaul. It borders the Ob River in the southeast and several districts in the north.

== Population ==
After 2002, the following inhabited localities were merged into the city district: Yuzhny, Lebyazhye, Tsentralny, Belmesevo, Konyukhi, Mokhnatushka, Chernitsk, Yagodnoye, Borzovaya Zaimka, Sadovodov, Plodopitomnik, Polzunovo, and Zaton, which led to the significant increase of the population.

== Sights ==
Places of interest include Demidov Square, Red Department Store, Nagorny Park, Tsentralny Park, Pokrovsky Cathedral, Polyakov's House, and more.

=== Gallery ===
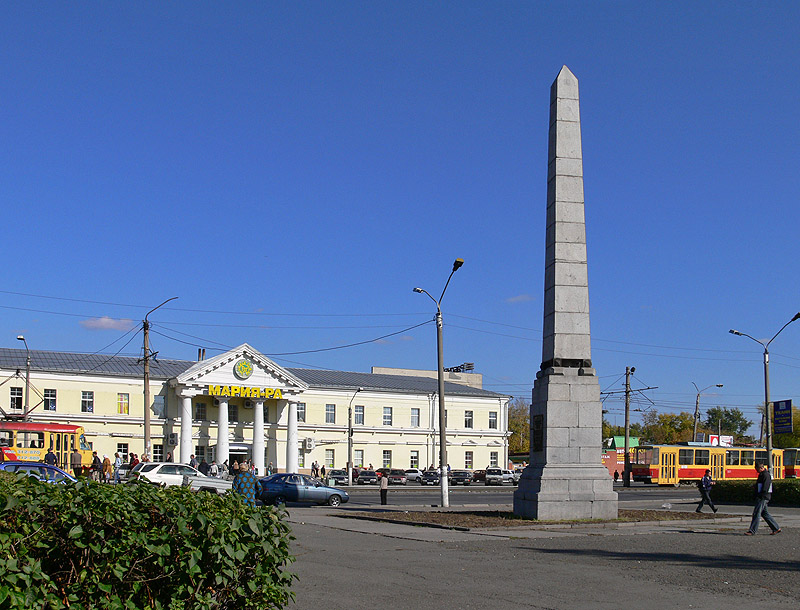
Demidov Square (Krasnoarmeysky Avenue)

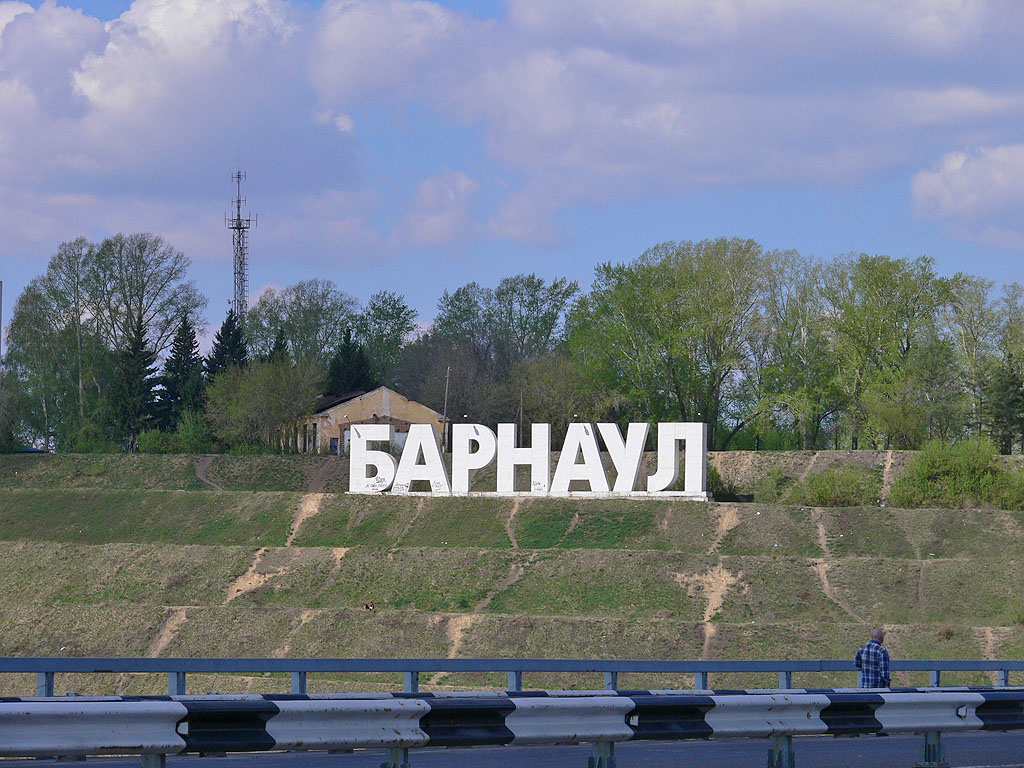
"Barnaul" sign in Nagorny Park

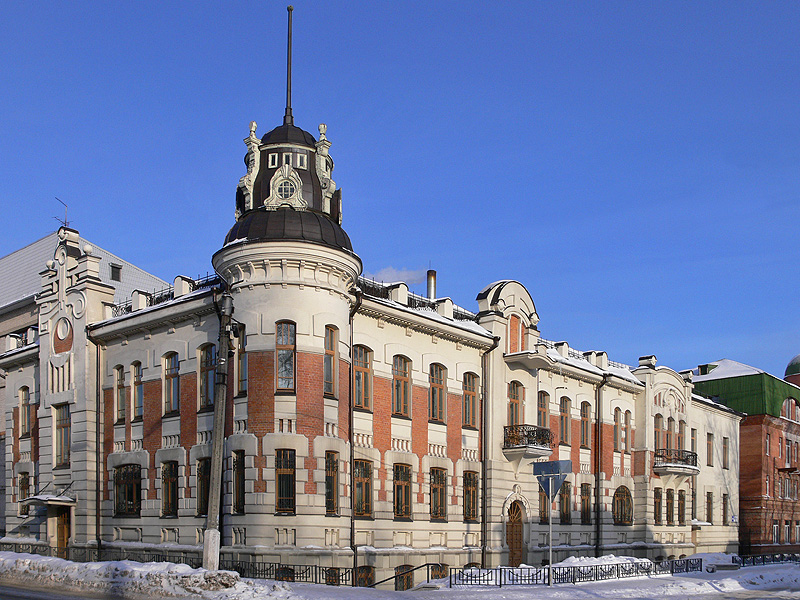
Polyakov House

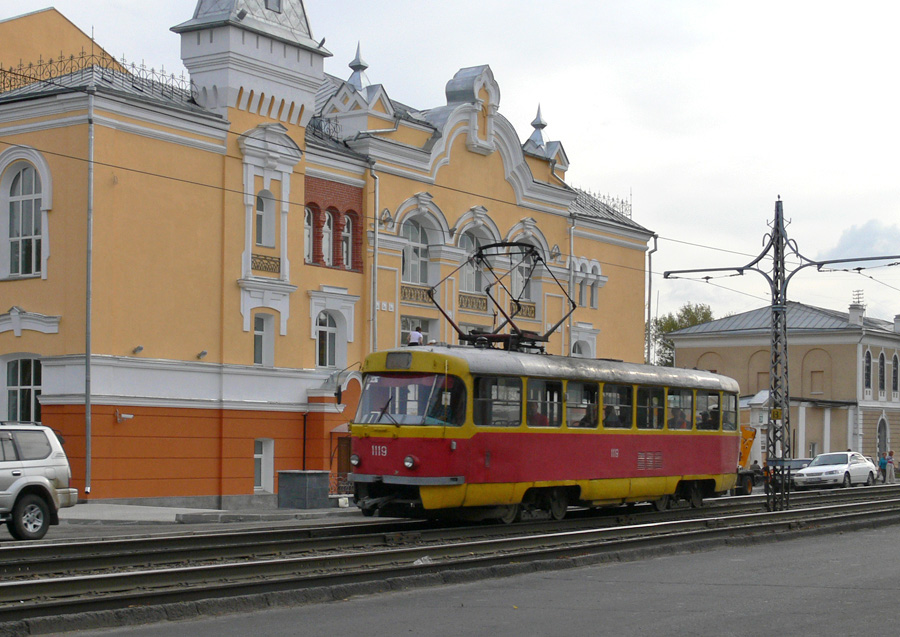
Tram on Polzunova Street

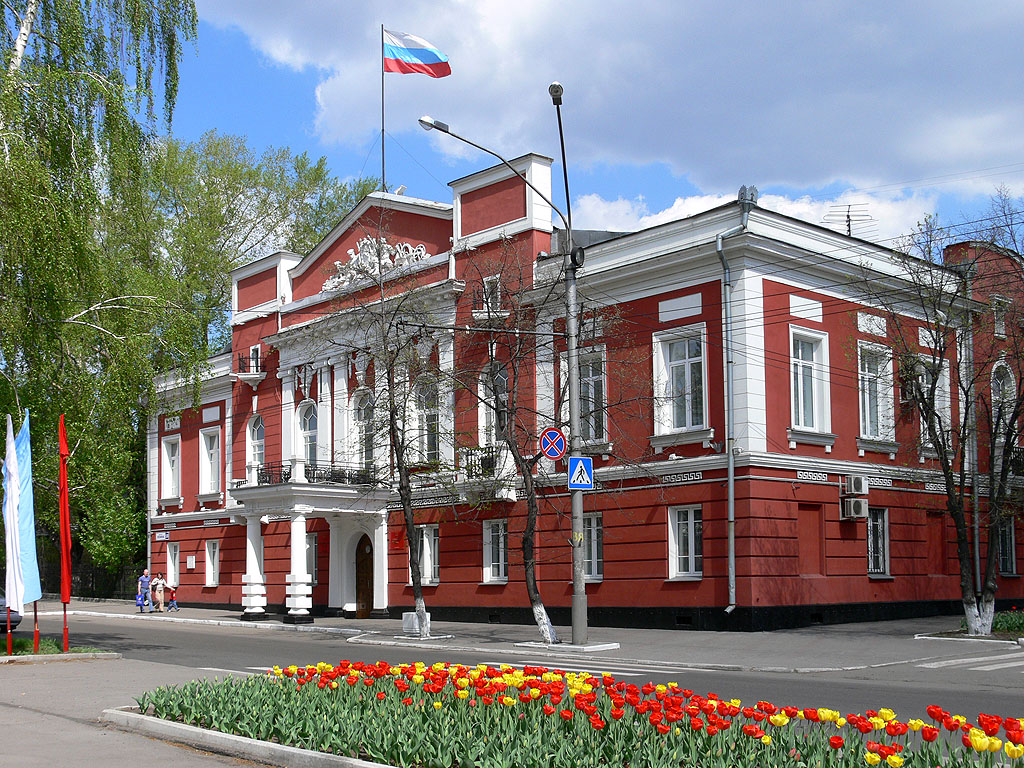
Barnaul City Duma

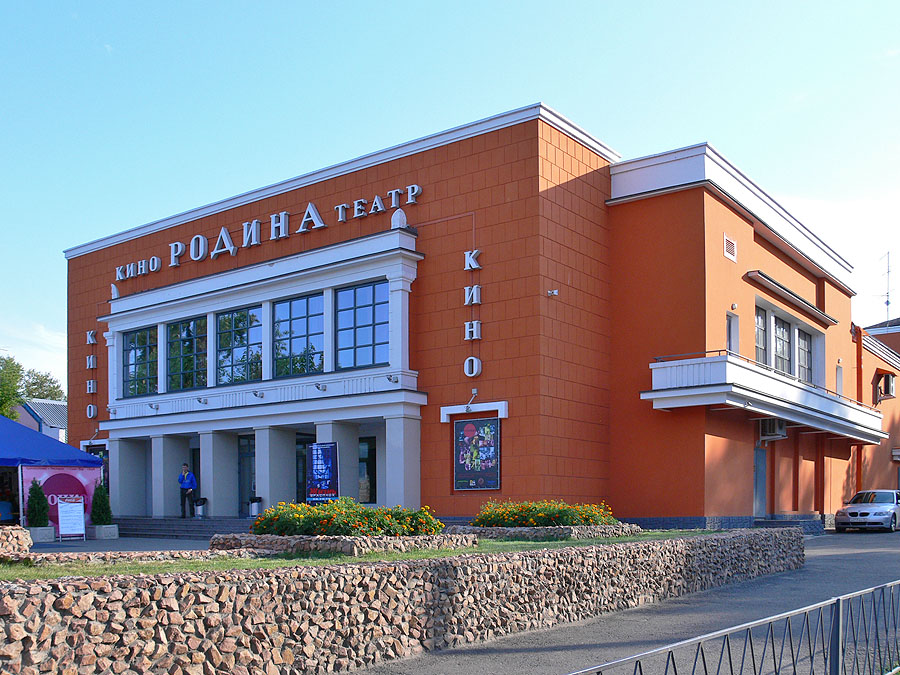
Rodina Cinema
