= Menesia nigricornis =

Scientific classification
- Kingdom: Animalia
- Phylum: Arthropoda
- Class: Insecta
- Order: Coleoptera
- Suborder: Polyphaga
- Infraorder: Cucujiformia
- Family: Cerambycidae
- Genus: Menesia
- Species: M. nigricornis

Binomial name
- Menesia nigricornis (Aurivillius, 1913)

Synonyms
- Glenea nigricornis Aurivillius, 1913

Species of beetle

Menesia nigricornis is a species of beetle in the family Cerambycidae. It was described by Per Olof Christopher Aurivillius in 1913. It is known from Borneo.
