= Menesia niveoguttata =

Scientific classification
- Kingdom: Animalia
- Phylum: Arthropoda
- Class: Insecta
- Order: Coleoptera
- Suborder: Polyphaga
- Infraorder: Cucujiformia
- Family: Cerambycidae
- Genus: Menesia
- Species: M. niveoguttata

Binomial name
- Menesia niveoguttata (Aurivillius, 1925)

Synonyms
- Daphisia niveoguttata Aurivillius, 1925

Species of beetle

Menesia niveoguttata is a species of beetle in the family Cerambycidae. It was described by Per Olof Christopher Aurivillius in 1925. It is known from Borneo.
