= Barnaul =

City in Altai Krai, Russia

Barnaul Барнаул
- City
- City Post and Telegraph Station "Parus" Business Center "Aquamarine" Residential Complex Regional Committee of the CPSU City Duma View of the city from Nagorny Park

- Flag Coat of arms
- Interactive map of Barnaul
- Location of Barnaul Barnaul (Altai Krai)
- Coordinates: 53°20′55″N 83°46′35″E
- Country: Russia
- Federal subject: Altai Krai
- Established: 1730
- City status since: 1771

Government
  - Body: City Duma
  - Head: Vyacheslav Frank

Area
  - Total: 940 km^{2} (360 sq mi)
- Elevation: 180 m (590 ft)

Population (2010 Census)
  - Total: 612,401
  - Estimate (2025): 700,326 (+14.4%)
  - Rank: 21st in 2010
  - Density: 650/km^{2} (1,700/sq mi)

Administrative status
  - Subordinated to: City of krai significance of Barnaul
  - Capital of: Altai Krai, City of krai significance of Barnaul

Municipal status
  - Urban okrug: Barnaul Urban Okrug
  - Capital of: Barnaul Urban Okrug
- Time zone: UTC+7 (MSK+4)
- Postal codes: 656000, 656002–656004, 656006, 656008, 656010–656012, 656015, 656016, 656018, 656019, 656021, 656023–656025, 656031, 656033, 656035–656039, 656043–656045, 656048–656050, 656052–656060, 656062–656068, 656700, 656880, 656890, 656899, 656905, 656960, 656961, 656963–656966, 656998, 656999, 901024, 901213
- Dialing code: +7 3852
- OKTMO ID: 01701000001
- City Day: One of the weekend days in August or September
- Website: barnaul.org

Barnaul (Russian: Барнау́л, IPA: [bərnɐˈul]) is the largest city and administrative centre of Altai Krai, Russia, located at the confluence of the Barnaulka and Ob rivers in the West Siberian Plain. As of the 2021 census, its population was 630,877, making it the 20th-largest city in Russia and the fourth-largest in the Siberian Federal District.

Located in the south of western Siberia on the left bank of the Ob River, Barnaul is a major transport, industrial, cultural, medical and educational hub of Siberia. Barnaul was founded by the wealthy Demidov family, who intended to develop the production of copper and silver, which continued after the factories were taken over by the Crown. Barnaul became a major centre of silver production in Russia. Barnaul was granted city status in 1771.

== Administrative and municipal status ==
Barnaul is the administrative centre of the krai. Within the framework of administrative divisions, it is, together with the work settlement of Yuzhny and twenty-four rural localities, incorporated as the city of krai significance of Barnaul – an administrative unit with the status equal to that of the districts. As a municipal division, the city of krai significance of Barnaul is incorporated as Barnaul Urban Okrug.

== Geography ==
Barnaul is located in the forest steppe zone of the West Siberian Plain, on the left bank of the Ob River, at its confluence with the Barnaulka.

The border with Kazakhstan is 345 km (210 mi) to the south, which makes Barnaul the closest major city to the Altai Mountains. The city is also situated relatively close to the Russian border with Mongolia and the border with China.

== History ==
=== Ancient history ===
The area around the city has been inhabited by modern humans, Neanderthals and Denisovans, for hundreds of thousands of years. They settled here to take advantage of the confluence of the rivers, used for transportation and fishing. In the late BC millennia, the locality was a centre of activity for Scythian and various Turkic peoples.

=== Russian Empire ===
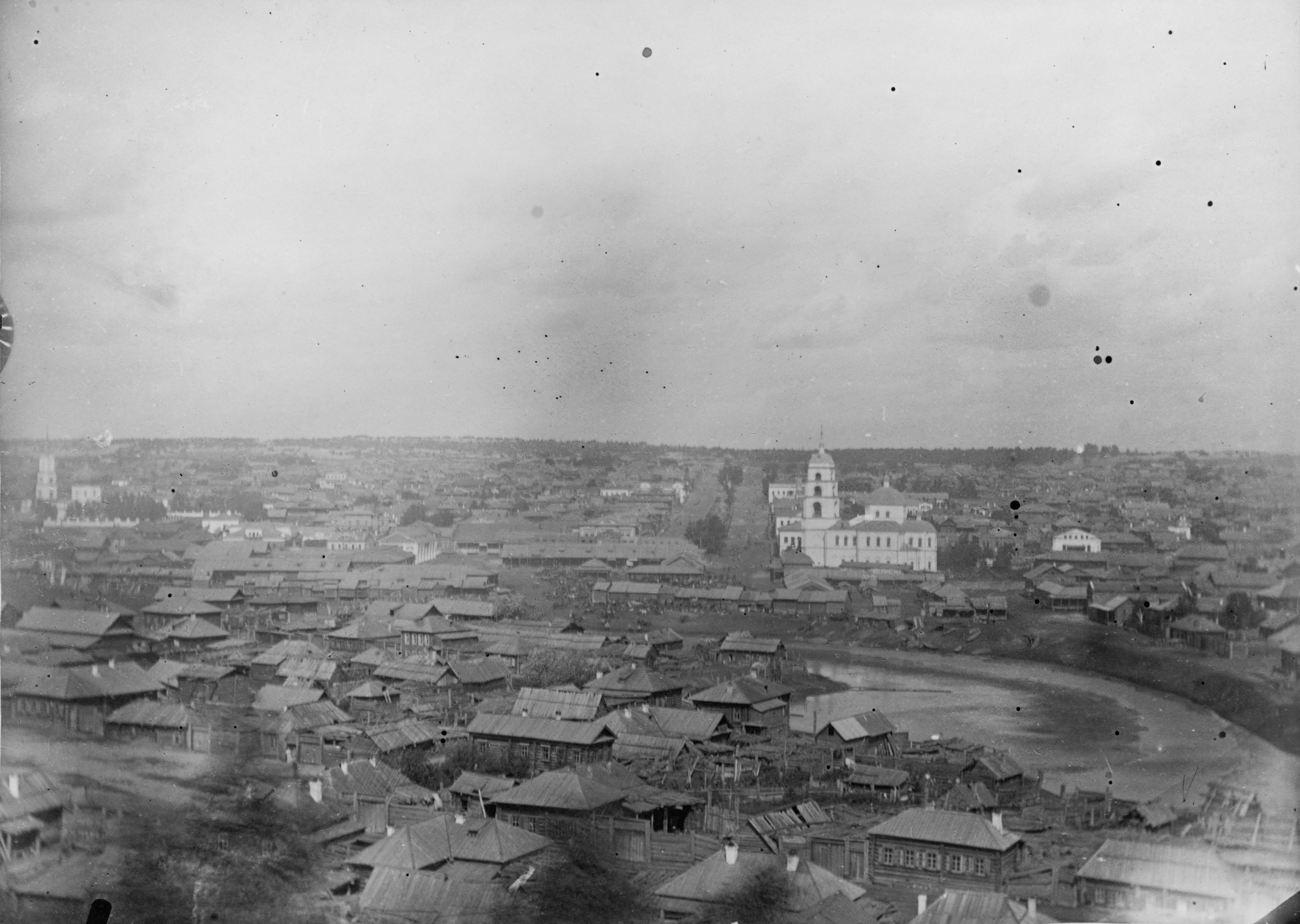
Barnaul in the 1880s

While 1730 is considered Barnaul's official establishment date, its first mention dates back to 1724. It was granted city status in 1771. Chosen for its proximity to the mineral-rich Altai Mountains and its location on a major river, it was founded by the wealthy Demidov family. The Demidovs wanted to develop the copper in the mountains, and soon found substantial deposits of silver as well. In 1747, the Demidovs' factories were taken over by the Crown. Barnaul became the centre of silver production of the Russian Empire.

In 1914, Barnaul was the site of the largest conscription riot in Russia during World War I. There were more than 100 casualties from the fighting.

Mary 'Marie' 'Maria' Stepanovna Zudilova Tatuloff Zacharenko Gurdin (1908–1998) was reputedly born in this city. She later became the mother of American actresses Natalie and Lana Wood. Her father Stepan was reputedly killed in the 1918 street fighting between the Whites and Reds following the Revolution. Afterward her mother took Mary and her siblings as refugees to Harbin, China. Mary married Alexander Tatuloff there in 1925, and they had a daughter Olga together. Mary eventually immigrated to the United States, where she divorced Alexander in 1936 and later married Nicholas Zacharenko, from Ussuriysk, and had two daughters with him.

=== World War II ===
Over half of the light ammunition used by the Soviet Union in World War II is estimated to have been manufactured in Barnaul. In connection with the formation of the Polish Anders' Army, a Polish diplomatic post was located in the city from November 1941 to July 1942.

=== Recent history ===
In 2012, when residents of Barnaul were denied a permit for a street protest, they ingeniously circumvented the restriction by staging a demonstration with toys such as teddy bears, Lego figures, and toy soldiers holding signs denouncing electoral corruption. The photos of these rebellious figurines quickly spread across Russia, prompting others to replicate the protest. Faced with an awkward dilemma, Putin's government decided to ban the toy protests, asserting that toys, not being Russian citizens, were ineligible to participate in public gatherings, as explained by a government official.

== Demographics ==
Historical population

Year	Pop.	±%
1897	21,073	—
1926	73,206	+247.4%
1939	148,162	+102.4%
1959	305,046	+105.9%
1970	439,134	+44.0%

Year	Pop.	±%
1979	533,263	+21.4%
1989	601,811	+12.9%
2002	600,749	−0.2%
2010	612,401	+1.9%
2021	630,877	+3.0%

Source: Russian Census

As of 2021, the ethnic composition of Barnaul was:

Ethnicity	Population	Percentage
Russians	492,285	95.9%
Tajiks	2,701	0.5%
Germans	2,644	0.5%
Ukrainians	1,759	0.3%
Armenians	1,668	0.3%
Other Ethnicities	12,398	2.4%

== Economy ==
Barnaul is an important industrial centre of Western Siberia. There are more than 100 industrial enterprises in the city, employing approximately 120,000 people. Leading industries include diesel and carbon processing; as well as production of heavy machinery, tyres, furniture and footwear. The Barnaul Cartridge Plant, a major manufacturer of small-arms ammunition, is located in the city.

== Transportation ==
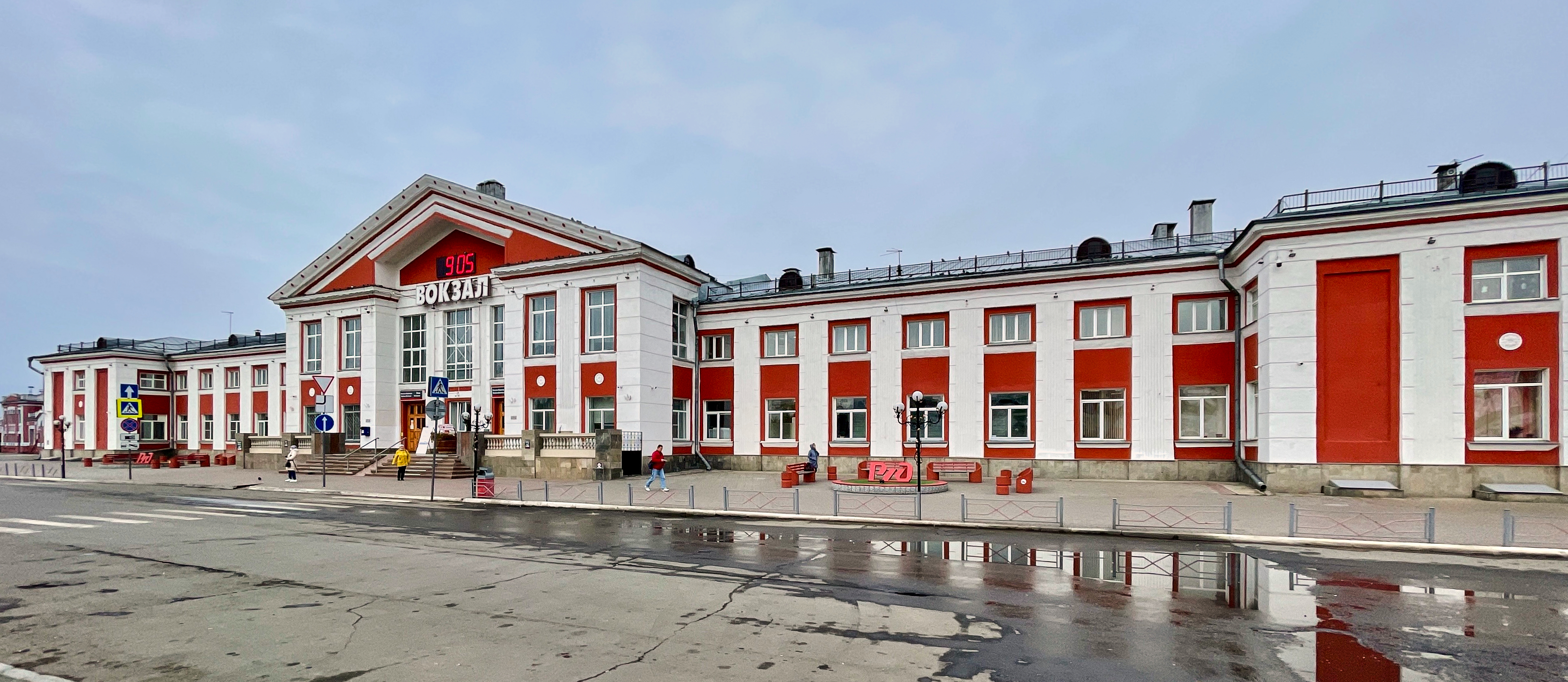
Barnaul railway station

Barnaul is located on the South Siberian, Turk–Sib and Omsk–Barnaul railway lines.

Barnaul has public transport of buses, minibuses, trolleybuses, trams and taxies. Intercity bus routes are operate to Novosibirsk, Tomsk, Krasnoyarsk, Biysk, Rubtsovsk and other cities. Also there are bus routes to Kazakhstan cities Oskemen, Pavlodar.

Barnaul International Airport is located 16 kilometres west of the city center. It is served by airlines such as Aeroflot, S7, Nordwind, Iraero and Ural Airlines. It has regular flights to Moscow, Novosibirsk, St. Petersburg, Surgut etc.

== Climate ==
The humid continental climate of Barnaul (Köppen Dfb) is defined by its geographical position at the southern end of the Siberian forest steppe: it is subject to long winters, with an average of −15.5 °C (4.1 °F) in January, but also enjoys a short warm season in the summer with an average temperature of 19.9 °C (67.8 °F) in July. Temperatures can vary in the extreme, from below −45 °C (−49 °F) in the winter to above 35 °C (95 °F) in the summer.

The climate is relatively dry. The average precipitation in the area is 433 mm (17.0 in) per year, 75% of which occurs during the region's warmer season. This means snow packs can be quite moderate in spite of the cold temperatures.

Climate data for Barnaul (1991–2020, extremes 1838–present)
Month	Jan	Feb	Mar	Apr	May	Jun	Jul	Aug	Sep	Oct	Nov	Dec	Year
Record high °C (°F)	5.3 (41.5)	7.4 (45.3)	16.4 (61.5)	32.3 (90.1)	37.4 (99.3)	38.5 (101.3)	37.9 (100.2)	38.3 (100.9)	34.4 (93.9)	27.4 (81.3)	16.6 (61.9)	7.2 (45.0)	38.5 (101.3)
Mean daily maximum °C (°F)	−11.4 (11.5)	−7.8 (18.0)	0.2 (32.4)	11.5 (52.7)	20.2 (68.4)	24.8 (76.6)	26.3 (79.3)	24.5 (76.1)	17.6 (63.7)	9.6 (49.3)	−2.2 (28.0)	−8.8 (16.2)	8.7 (47.7)
Daily mean °C (°F)	−16.2 (2.8)	−13.6 (7.5)	−5.7 (21.7)	5.0 (41.0)	12.9 (55.2)	18.2 (64.8)	19.9 (67.8)	17.6 (63.7)	11.0 (51.8)	4.0 (39.2)	−6.2 (20.8)	−13.1 (8.4)	2.8 (37.0)
Mean daily minimum °C (°F)	−20.7 (−5.3)	−18.7 (−1.7)	−10.9 (12.4)	−0.3 (31.5)	6.4 (43.5)	12.0 (53.6)	14.2 (57.6)	11.8 (53.2)	5.6 (42.1)	−0.2 (31.6)	−9.9 (14.2)	−17.6 (0.3)	−2.4 (27.7)
Record low °C (°F)	−48.2 (−54.8)	−46.1 (−51.0)	−38.9 (−38.0)	−27.6 (−17.7)	−8.8 (16.2)	−1.2 (29.8)	2.9 (37.2)	0.0 (32.0)	−7.8 (18.0)	−27.0 (−16.6)	−42.8 (−45.0)	−43.9 (−47.0)	−48.2 (−54.8)
Average precipitation mm (inches)	23 (0.9)	18 (0.7)	19 (0.7)	28 (1.1)	41 (1.6)	54 (2.1)	72 (2.8)	45 (1.8)	36 (1.4)	35 (1.4)	40 (1.6)	32 (1.3)	443 (17.4)
Average extreme snow depth cm (inches)	38 (15)	47 (19)	45 (18)	6 (2.4)	0 (0)	0 (0)	0 (0)	0 (0)	0 (0)	1 (0.4)	8 (3.1)	23 (9.1)	47 (19)
Average rainy days	0.4	1	3	12	17	16	17	15	16	14	6	1	118
Average snowy days	22	20	16	9	2	0.1	0	0	1	10	18	24	122
Average relative humidity (%)	78	76	74	63	55	64	70	70	69	73	79	79	71
Mean monthly sunshine hours	77	112	178	218	272	315	320	265	199	109	75	64	2,204
Source 1: Pogoda.ru.net
Source 2: NOAA (sun only, 1961–1990)

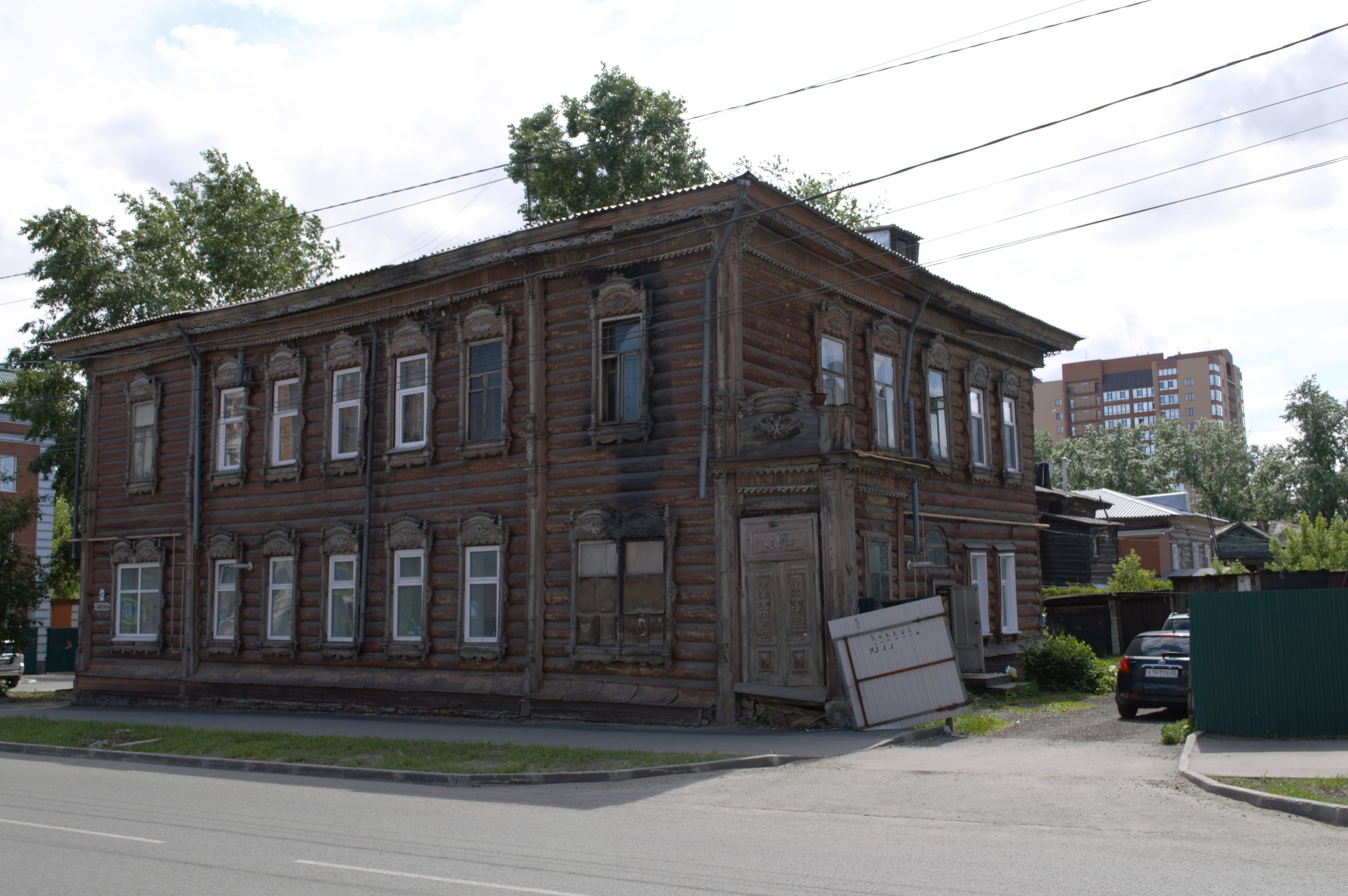
A historical wooden house in Barnaul on the Socialisticheskiy Prospect

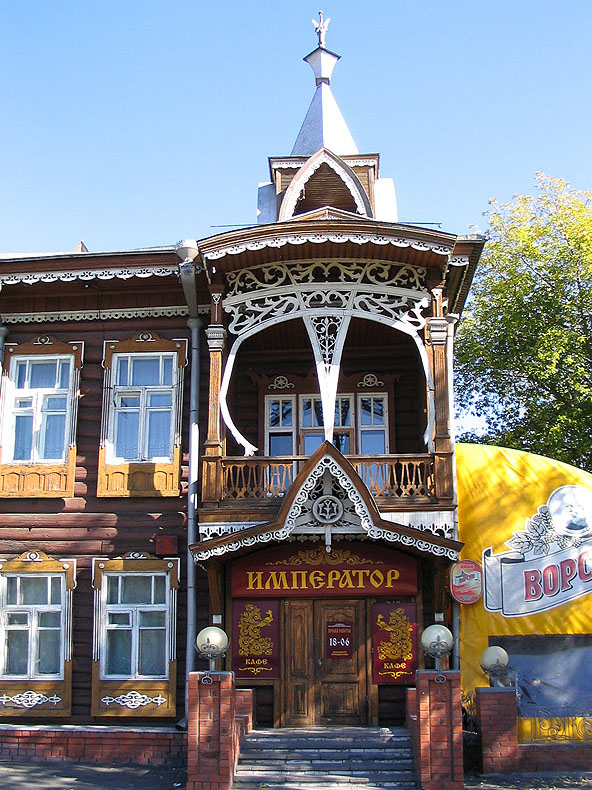
A historical wooden house used to be as the Imperator Restaurant (former Russian Tea Restaurant), now under reconstruction

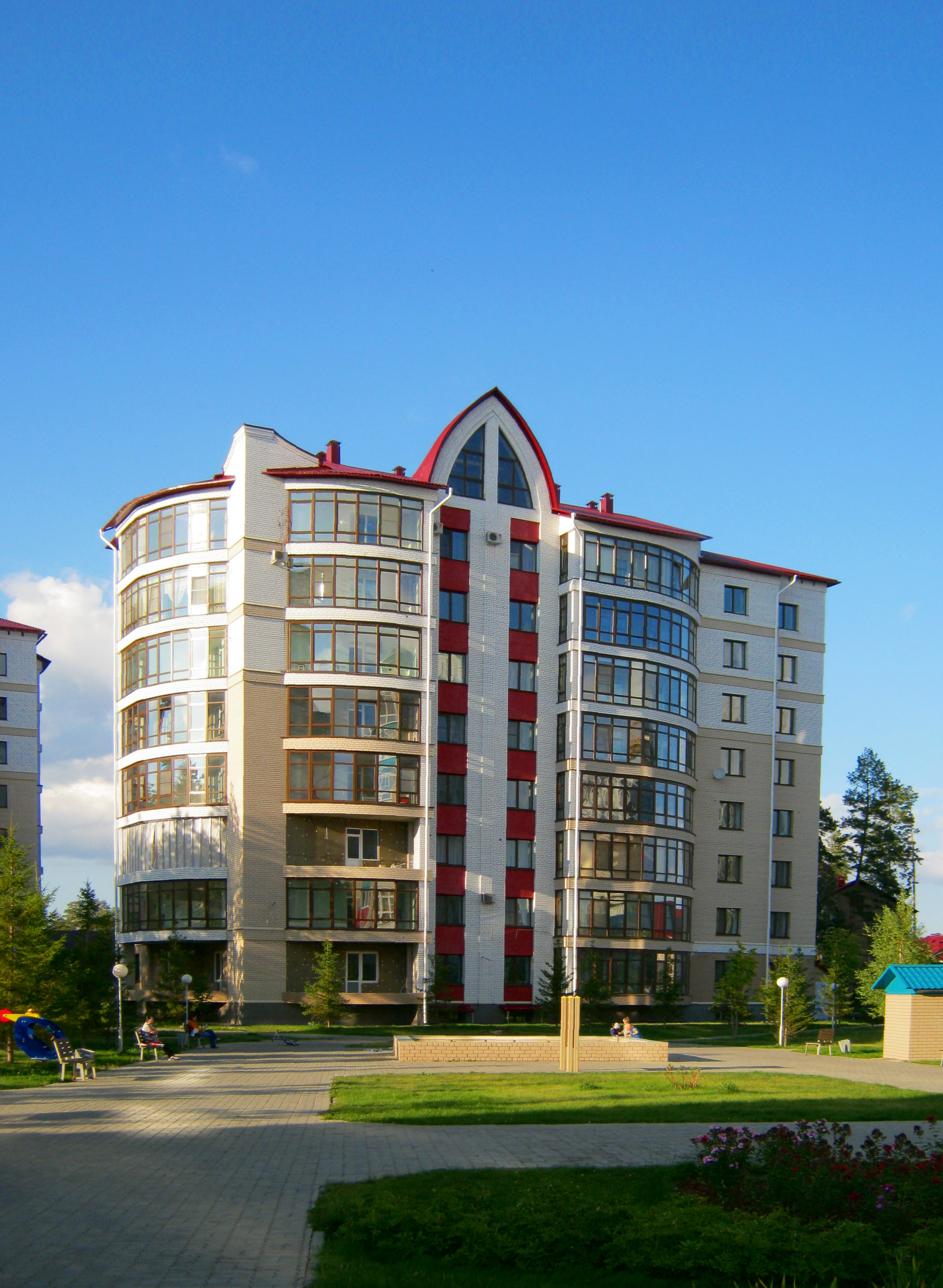
Modern apartment building, built in 2010

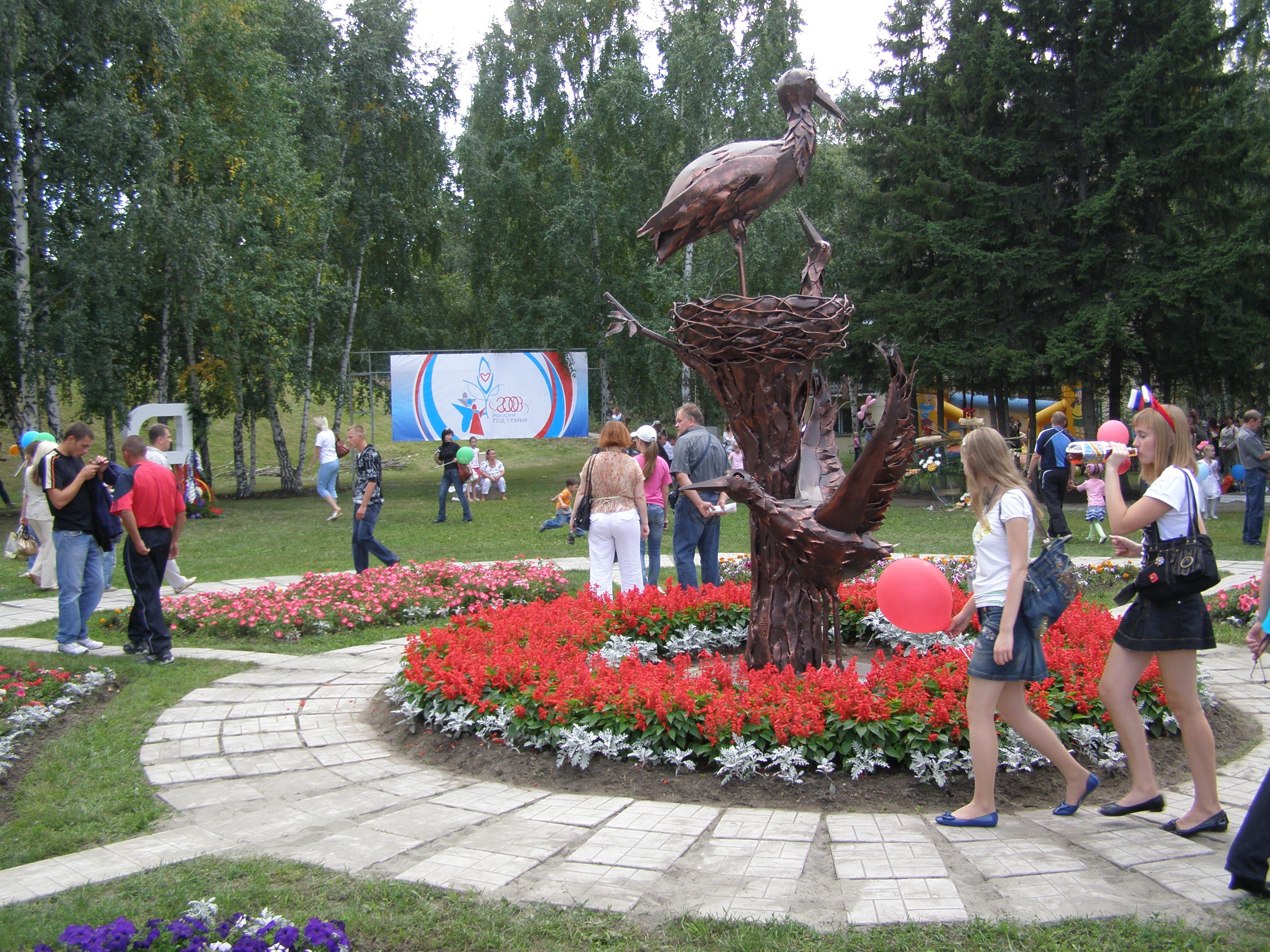
Park in Barnaul

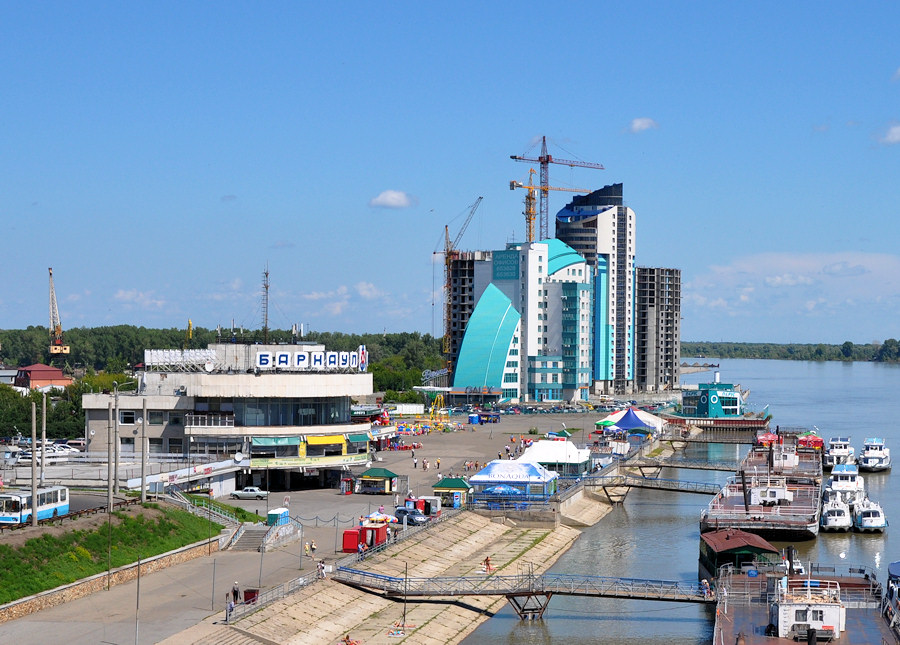
The Ob River in Barnaul

== Notable people ==
- Alexander von Bunge, botanist, worked in Barnaul
- Maria Butina, alleged agent of Russia, and member of the State Duma
- Aleksey Chuklin, racing driver
- Yakov Erlikh, Russian professional football player
- Pyotr Kozmitch Frolov, scientist and inventor
- Valery Kopytov, serial killer
- Tatyana Kotova, Olympic champion in long jump
- Ignatiy Lapkin, controversial preacher and sect founder and leader; went to technical college in Barnaul
- Kirill Marchenko, NHL professional ice hockey player
- Julia Neigel, singer, songwriter
- Ivan Nifontov, World champion and Olympic medalist in Judo
- Alexey Novikov-Priboy, writer
- Ivan Polzunov, inventor, creator of the first two-cylinder engine in the world
- Anastasiia Salos, European and world medalist rhythmic gymnast
- Konstantin Scherbakov, pianist
- Sergey Shubenkov, track and field athlete, 2015 world champion
- Nadezhda Shuvayeva-Olkhova, Olympic champion in basketball
- Alexey Smertin, former captain of the Russia national football team
- Rita Streich, coloratura soprano
- Andrei Svechnikov, professional NHL ice hockey player
- Evgeny Svechnikov, professional NHL and KHL ice hockey player
- Nikolai Yadrintsev, explorer and archeologist, discoveries include the Orkhon script, Genghis Khan's capital, Karakorum
- Mikhail Yakubov, NHL and KHL professional ice hockey player
- Mikhail Yevdokimov, comedian and former governor of Altai Krai
- Maxim Zimin, racing driver
- Maria Zudilova, mother of Natalie Wood

== Twin towns – sister cities ==
Barnaul is twinned with:

- Baicheng, China
- Changji, China
- Flagstaff, United States
- Öskemen, Kazakhstan
- Shumen, Bulgaria

== See also ==
- Nagorny Park
- Tsentralny City District, Barnaul
- Timeline of Barnaul
