= Pyotr Frolov =

Pyotr Kozmich Frolov
- Пётр Козьмич Фролов
- Born: 27 January [O.S. 16 January] 1775
- Died: 22 December [O.S. 10 December] 1839 (aged 64); Saint Petersburg, Russian Empire
- Occupations: Engineer, inventor
- Father: Kozma Dmitrievich Frolov

Pyotr Kozmich Frolov (Russian: Пётр Козьми́ч Фроло́в; 27 January [O.S. 16 January] 1775 – 22 December [O.S. 10 December] 1839) was a Russian mining engineer and inventor who built the first horse-railway in the Russian Empire in 1809. He elaborated on various canal projects and other artificial water constructions. Frolov also contributed to the development of scientific research and to the culture of the Altay region. His activities as a head of the Kolyvano-Voskresensk factories promoted a great advance of Russian technology in the beginning of the 20th century. He was appointed a senator in 1831.
