= Friedrich August von Gebler =

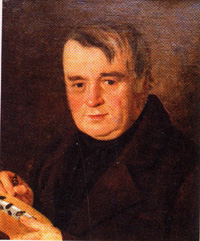

Friedrich August von Gebler or Fedor Vasilievich Gebler (Russian: Федор Васильевич Геблер; 15 December 1781 – 9 March 1850) was a Prussian medical doctor, explorer, and naturalist who worked in the Russian Empire and was a corresponding member of the Imperial Academy of Sciences of Russia. He described several species of beetle and the Altai snowcock.

== Biography ==
Gebler was born in Zeulenroda to a Prussian-Austrian civil servant Georg Wilhelm Gebler and his wife Ernestine Frederika, née von Fickweiler. He was tutored at home followed by studies at the Lyceum in Greiz and went to study medicine and natural science at the University of Jena. He was also keenly interested in minerals but failing to find a position in that field he chose to study medicine. He received his degree in medicine in 1802 and practiced in Zeulenroda, Greiz, and then Dresden. He moved to St. Petersburg in 1808 and joined the Russian government service in 1809 working at a hospital in Barnaul, Altai, south Siberia. He married Alexandra Zoubareva and they had five children. He became a Russian citizen in 1836. While located in the Altai region, he explored, collected and described specimens of fauna and flora. Along with Pyotr Kozmitch Frolov he founded the Barnaul Natural History Museum in 1823. He was visited by Carl Friedrich von Ledebour in 1826 and Alexander von Humboldt in 1829.

Gebler died in Barnaul and was buried in the Nagorny cemetery which was destroyed in the mid-1930s and has since been restored. The Gebler glacier near Belukha is named after him. A street and a square in the municipality of Zeulenroda-Triebes are named after Gebler. A mollusc Limnaeus gebleri is named after him.
