= Bembidion (Eurytrachelus) =

Scientific classification
- Kingdom: Animalia
- Phylum: Arthropoda
- Clade: Pancrustacea
- Class: Insecta
- Order: Coleoptera
- Suborder: Adephaga
- Family: Carabidae
- Genus: Bembidion
- Subgenus: Bembidion (Eurytrachelus); Motschulsky, 1850

Synonyms
- Eudromus Kirby, 1837 (non Klug 1835: preoccupied); Eurytrachelus Motschulsky, 1850; Platytrachelus Motschulsky, 1844 (non Schönherr 1843: preoccupied); Pogonidium Ganglbauer, 1892; Trachypachis (lapsus); Trachypachys Lacordaire, 1854 (unjustified emendation); Trachypachus Motschulsky, 1844; Trachyplatys (lapsus)

Subgenus of beetles

Eurytrachelus is a subgenus of the ground beetle genus Bembidion. Sometimes included in Bembidion (Odontium), it is endemic to Europe.

Species include:

- Bembidion laticolle
