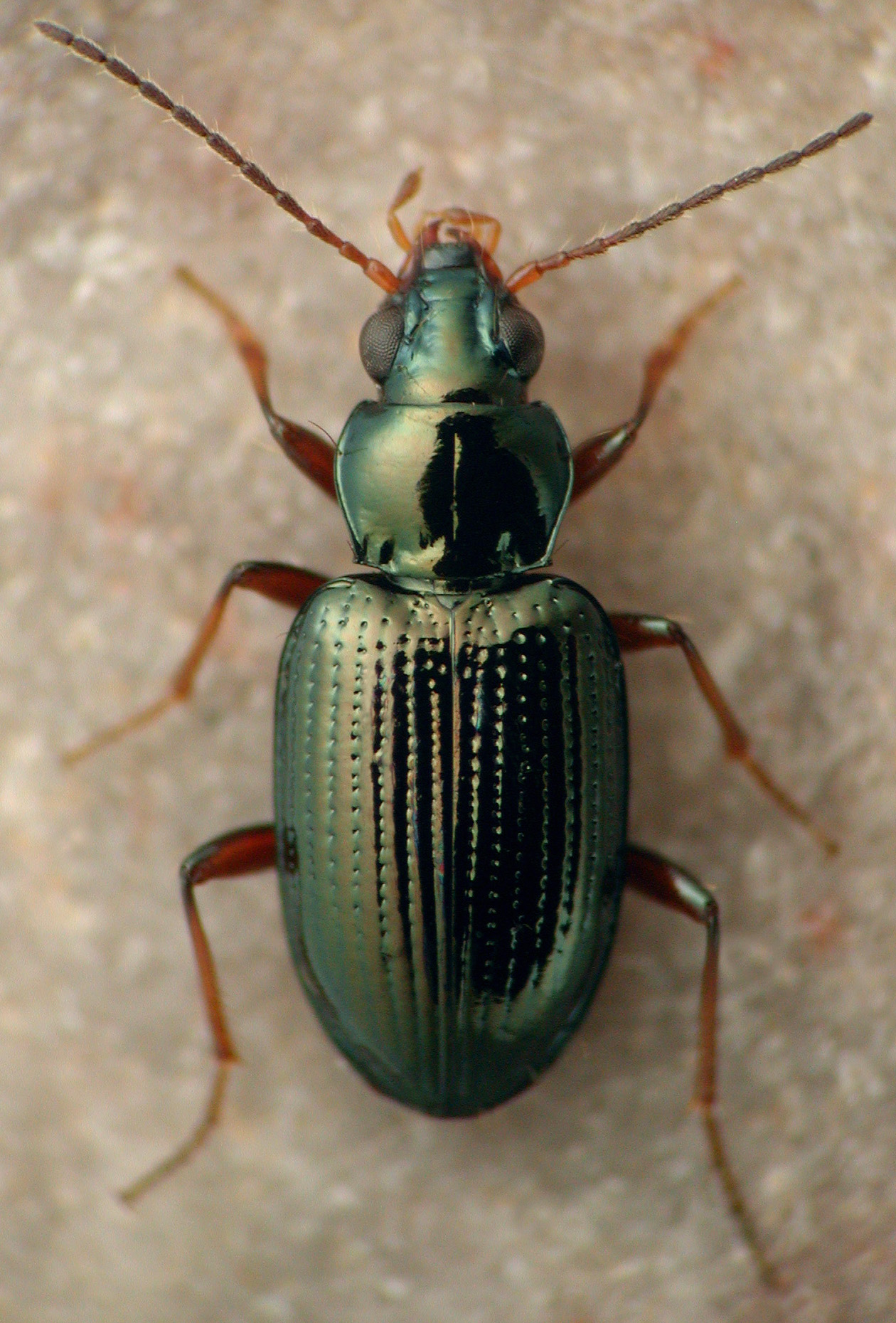

Scientific classification
- Kingdom: Animalia
- Phylum: Arthropoda
- Class: Insecta
- Order: Coleoptera
- Suborder: Adephaga
- Family: Carabidae
- Genus: Bembidion
- Species: B. nigrum

Binomial name
- Bembidion nigrum Say, 1823

= Bembidion nigrum =

Species of beetle

Bembidion nigrum is a species of ground beetle in the family Carabidae. It is found in North America.

== Subspecies ==
These two subspecies belong to the species Bembidion nigrum:

- Bembidion nigrum facile Casey
- Bembidion nigrum nigrum
