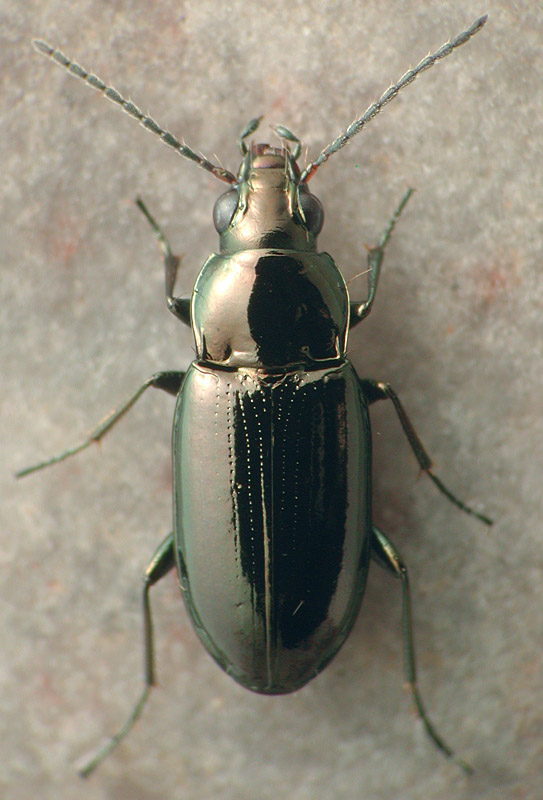

Scientific classification
- Kingdom: Animalia
- Phylum: Arthropoda
- Class: Insecta
- Order: Coleoptera
- Suborder: Adephaga
- Family: Carabidae
- Genus: Bembidion
- Species: B. nitidum

Binomial name
- Bembidion nitidum (Kirby, 1837)

Synonyms
- Paryphus nitidus Kirby, 1837; Bembidion edolatum Casey, 1924

= Bembidion nitidum =

Species of beetle

Bembidion nitidum is a species of beetle in the family Carabidae. It is found in Canada and the United States.
