= Bembidion caucasicum =

Scientific classification
- Domain: Eukaryota
- Kingdom: Animalia
- Phylum: Arthropoda
- Class: Insecta
- Order: Coleoptera
- Suborder: Adephaga
- Family: Carabidae
- Genus: Bembidion
- Species: B. caucasicum

Binomial name
- Bembidion caucasicum (Motschulsky, 1844)

Species of beetle

Bembidion caucasicum is a species of ground beetle from the Trechinae subfamily that can be found in Armenia, Bosnia and Herzegovina, Bulgaria, Georgia, Greece, Lebanon, North Macedonia, Russia, Serbia and Turkey.
