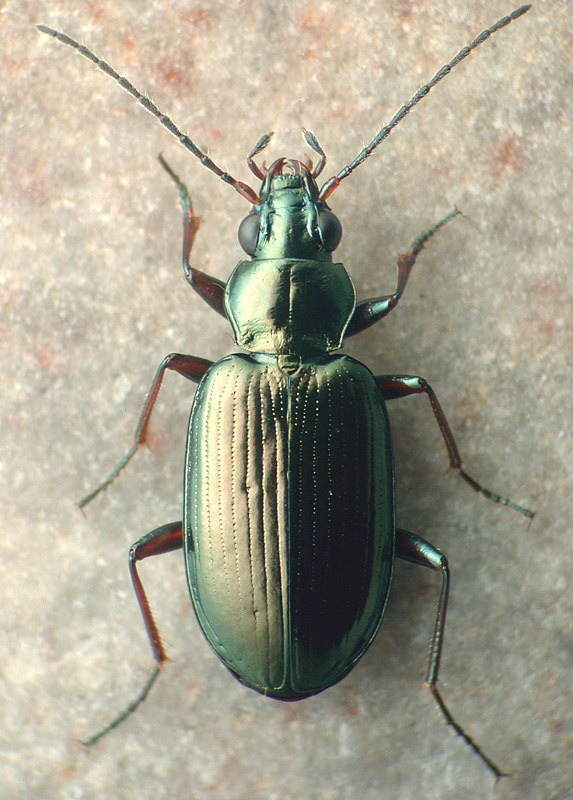

Scientific classification
- Kingdom: Animalia
- Phylum: Arthropoda
- Class: Insecta
- Order: Coleoptera
- Suborder: Adephaga
- Family: Carabidae
- Genus: Bembidion
- Species: B. antiquum

Binomial name
- Bembidion antiquum Dejean, 1831

= Bembidion antiquum =

Species of beetle

Bembidion antiquum is a species of ground beetle in the subfamily Trechinae. It is found in Canada and the United States.
