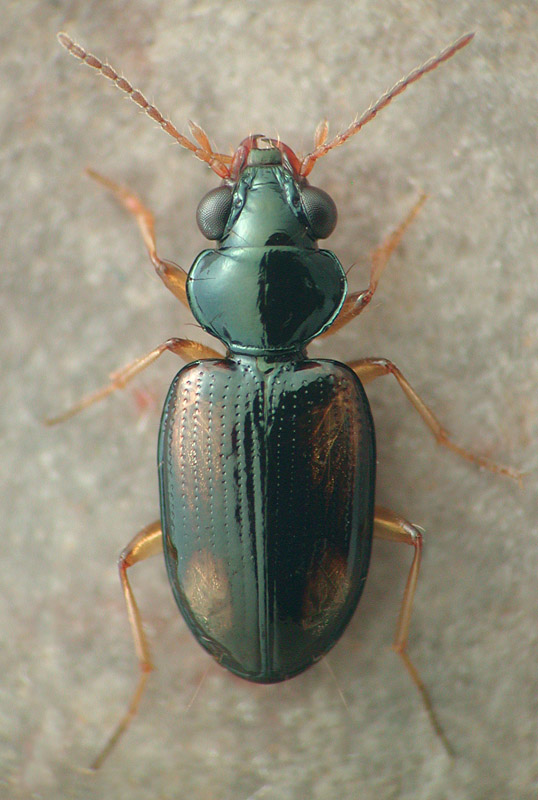

Scientific classification
- Kingdom: Animalia
- Phylum: Arthropoda
- Class: Insecta
- Order: Coleoptera
- Suborder: Adephaga
- Family: Carabidae
- Genus: Bembidion
- Species: B. poculare

Binomial name
- Bembidion poculare Bates, 1884

Synonyms
- Bembidion dilaticolle Notman, 1919

= Bembidion poculare =

Species of beetle

Bembidion poculare is a species of ground beetle in the family Carabidae. It is found in North America.
