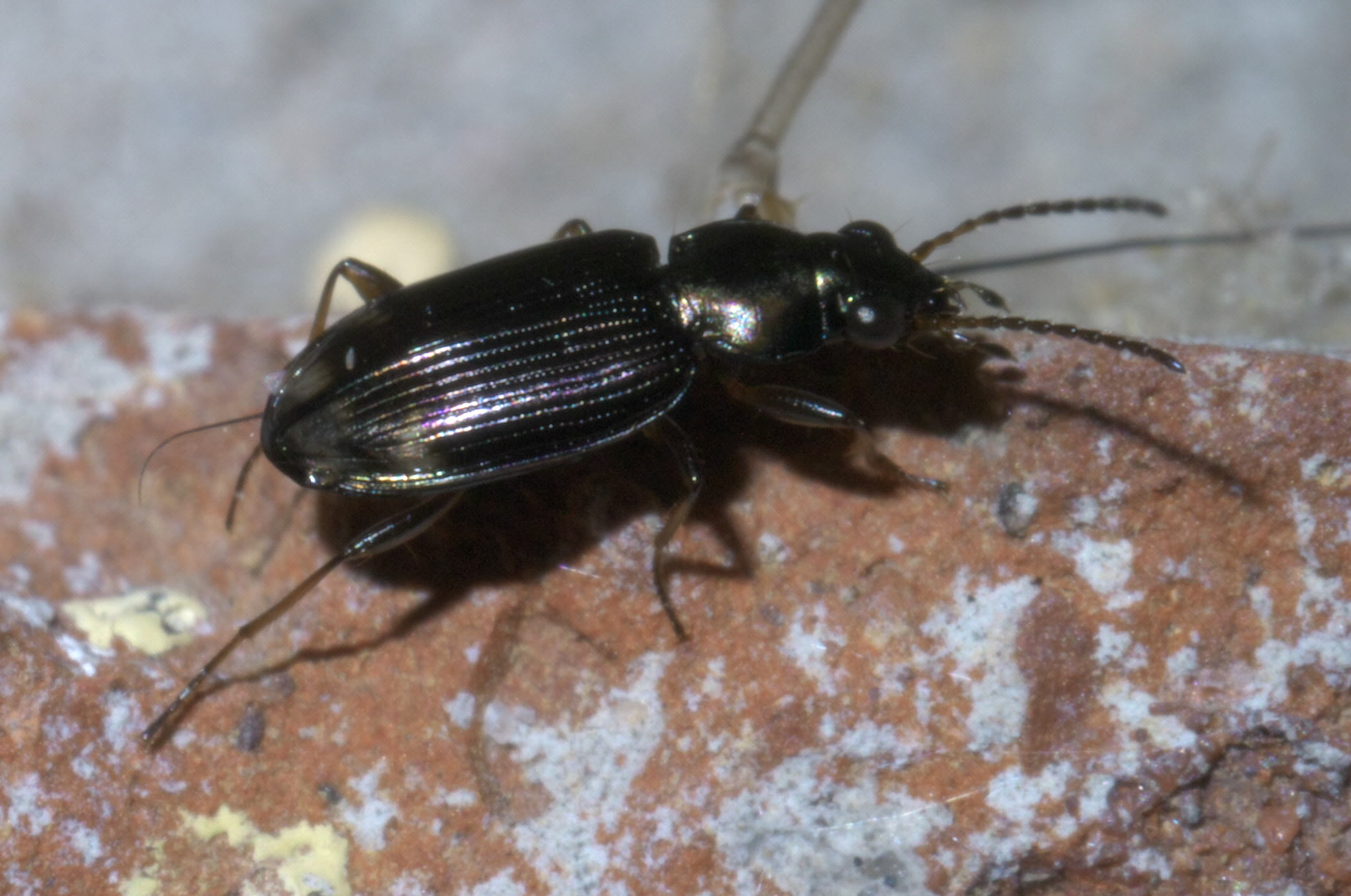

Scientific classification
- Kingdom: Animalia
- Phylum: Arthropoda
- Class: Insecta
- Order: Coleoptera
- Suborder: Adephaga
- Family: Carabidae
- Genus: Bembidion
- Species: B. rapidum

Binomial name
- Bembidion rapidum (LeConte, 1847)

Synonyms
- Ochthedromus rapidus LeConte, 1847; Bembidion docile Casey, 1918; Bembidion fugitans Casey, 1918; Bembidion negligens Casey, 1918; Bembidion sociale Casey, 1918

= Bembidion rapidum =

Species of beetle

Bembidion rapidum is a species of ground beetle in the subfamily Trechinae. It is found in Canada and the United States. It is 3.8–4.4 mm (0.15–0.17 in) long and black with brassy reflections.

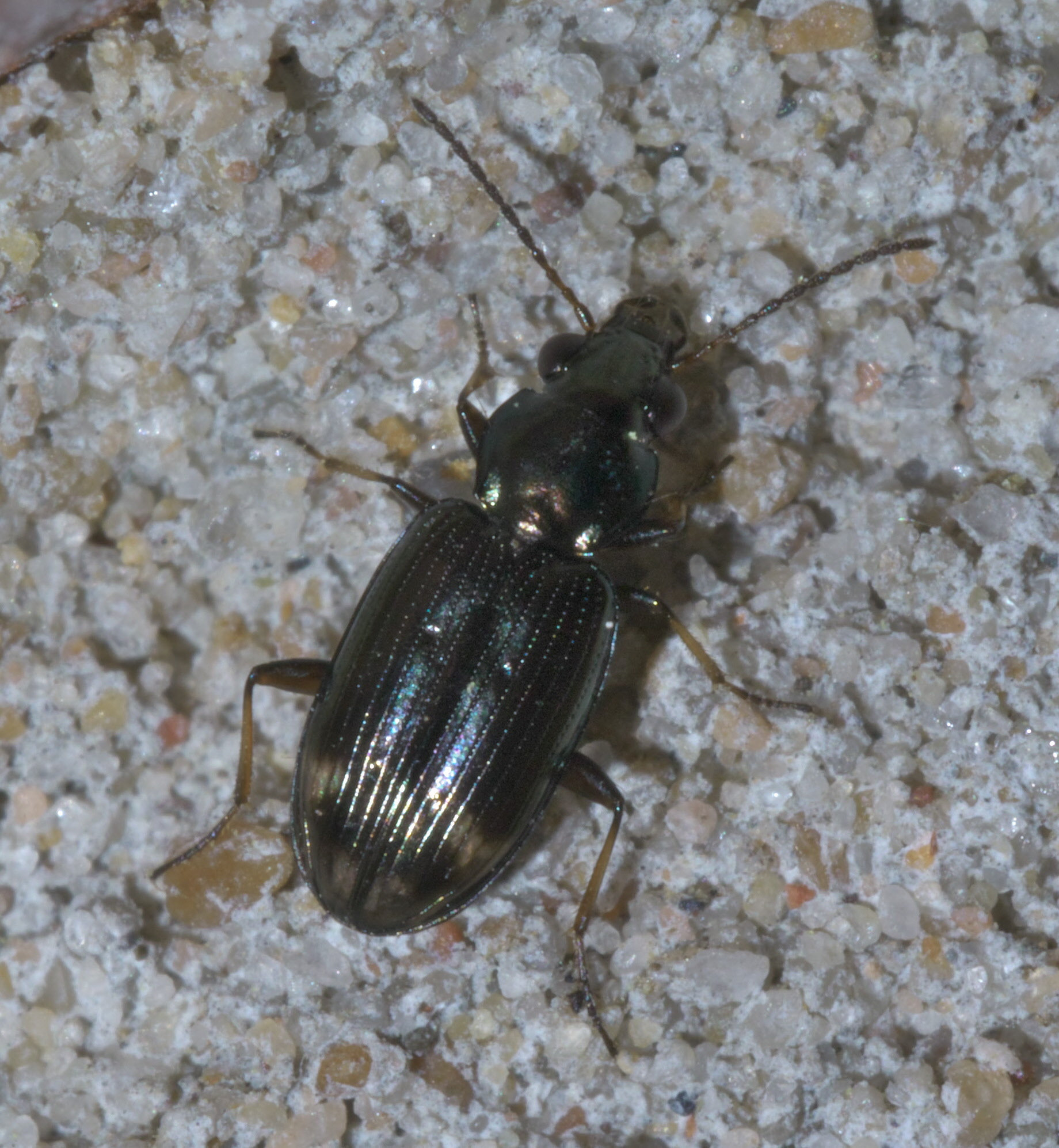

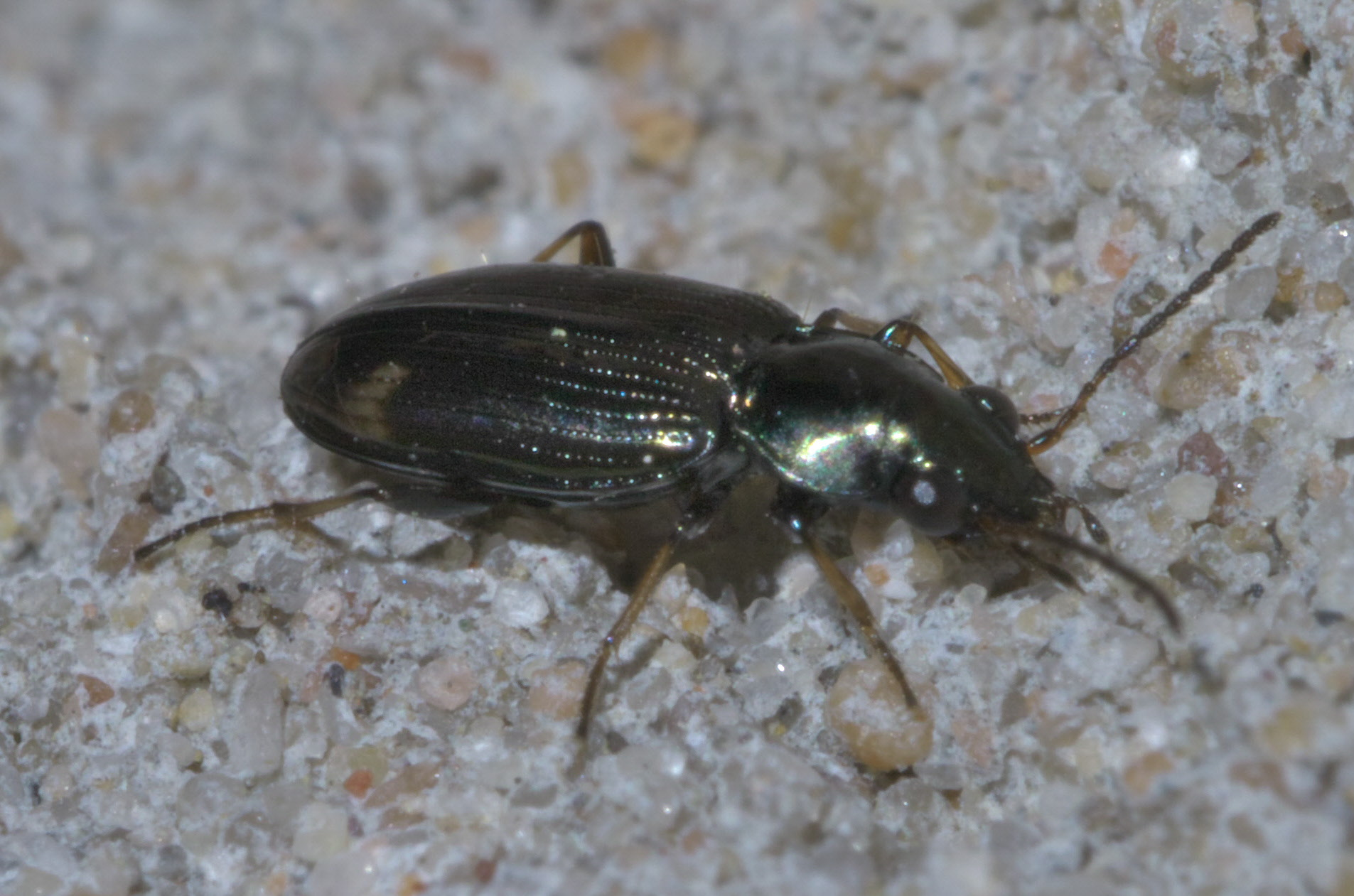
