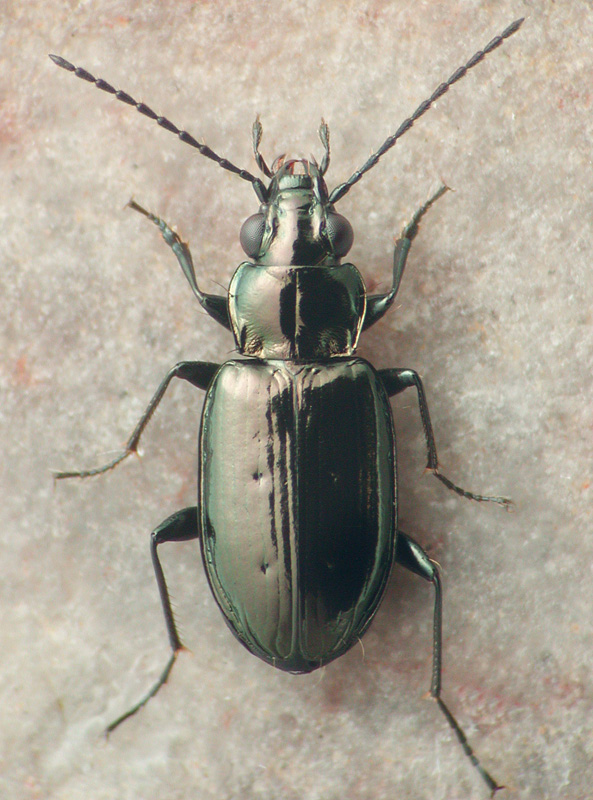

Scientific classification
- Kingdom: Animalia
- Phylum: Arthropoda
- Class: Insecta
- Order: Coleoptera
- Suborder: Adephaga
- Family: Carabidae
- Genus: Bembidion
- Species: B. breve

Binomial name
- Bembidion breve (Motschulsky, 1845)

Synonyms
- Bembidion incertum Motschulsky, 1845; Bembidion testatum Casey, 1918

= Bembidion breve =

Species of beetle

Bembidion breve is a species of ground beetle in the family Carabidae. It is found in North America.
