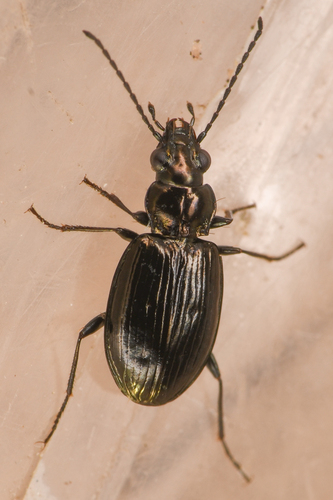

Scientific classification
- Kingdom: Animalia
- Phylum: Arthropoda
- Clade: Pancrustacea
- Class: Insecta
- Order: Coleoptera
- Suborder: Adephaga
- Family: Carabidae
- Genus: Bembidion
- Species: B. haruspex

Binomial name
- Bembidion haruspex Casey, 1918

= Bembidion haruspex =

Species of beetle

Bembidion haruspex is a species of ground beetle in the family Carabidae. It is found in North America.
