= Cillenus =

Former genus of beetles

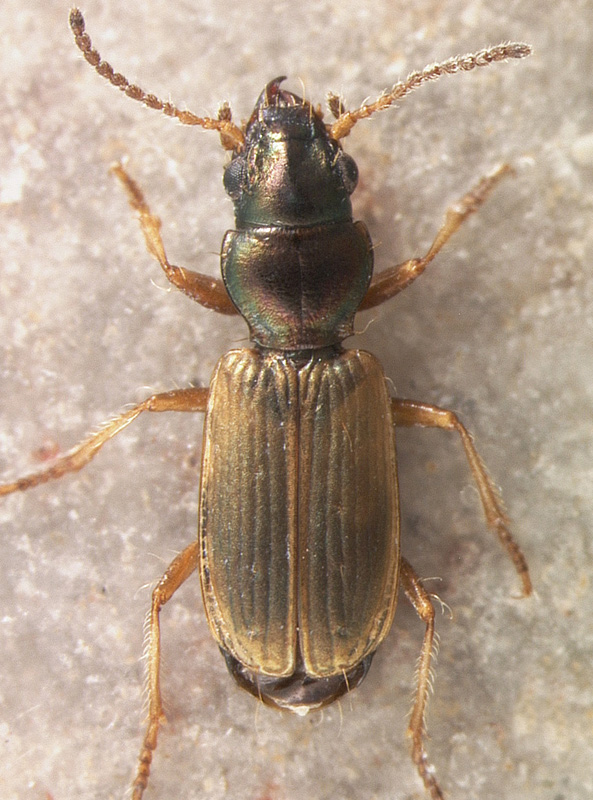
Cillenus

Cillenus was formerly a genus of beetles in the family Carabidae, but has been transferred to the genus Bembidion as a subgenus. Its species are now members of that genus.
