= Bembidion planiusculum =

Scientific classification
- Kingdom: Animalia
- Phylum: Arthropoda
- Class: Insecta
- Order: Coleoptera
- Suborder: Adephaga
- Family: Carabidae
- Genus: Bembidion
- Species: B. planiusculum

Binomial name
- Bembidion planiusculum Mannerheim, 1843

Synonyms
- Bembidium planiusculum Mannerheim, 1843

Species of beetle

Bembidion planiusculum is a species of ground beetle in the family Carabidae. It is found in western North America from Alaska south to northern Washington and east to central Alberta.
