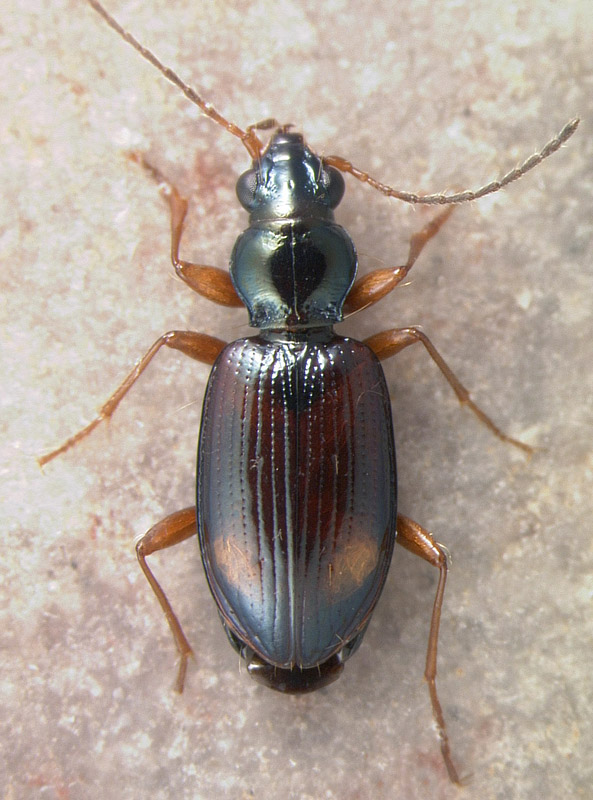

Scientific classification
- Kingdom: Animalia
- Phylum: Arthropoda
- Class: Insecta
- Order: Coleoptera
- Suborder: Adephaga
- Family: Carabidae
- Genus: Bembidion
- Species: B. scopulinum

Binomial name
- Bembidion scopulinum (Kirby, 1837)

= Bembidion scopulinum =

Species of beetle

Bembidion scopulinum is a species of ground beetle in the family Carabidae. It is found in Europe and Northern Asia (excluding China), North America, and temperate Asia.

== Subspecies ==
These two subspecies belong to the species Bembidion scopulinum:

- Bembidion scopulinum bellulum Casey
- Bembidion scopulinum scopulinum
