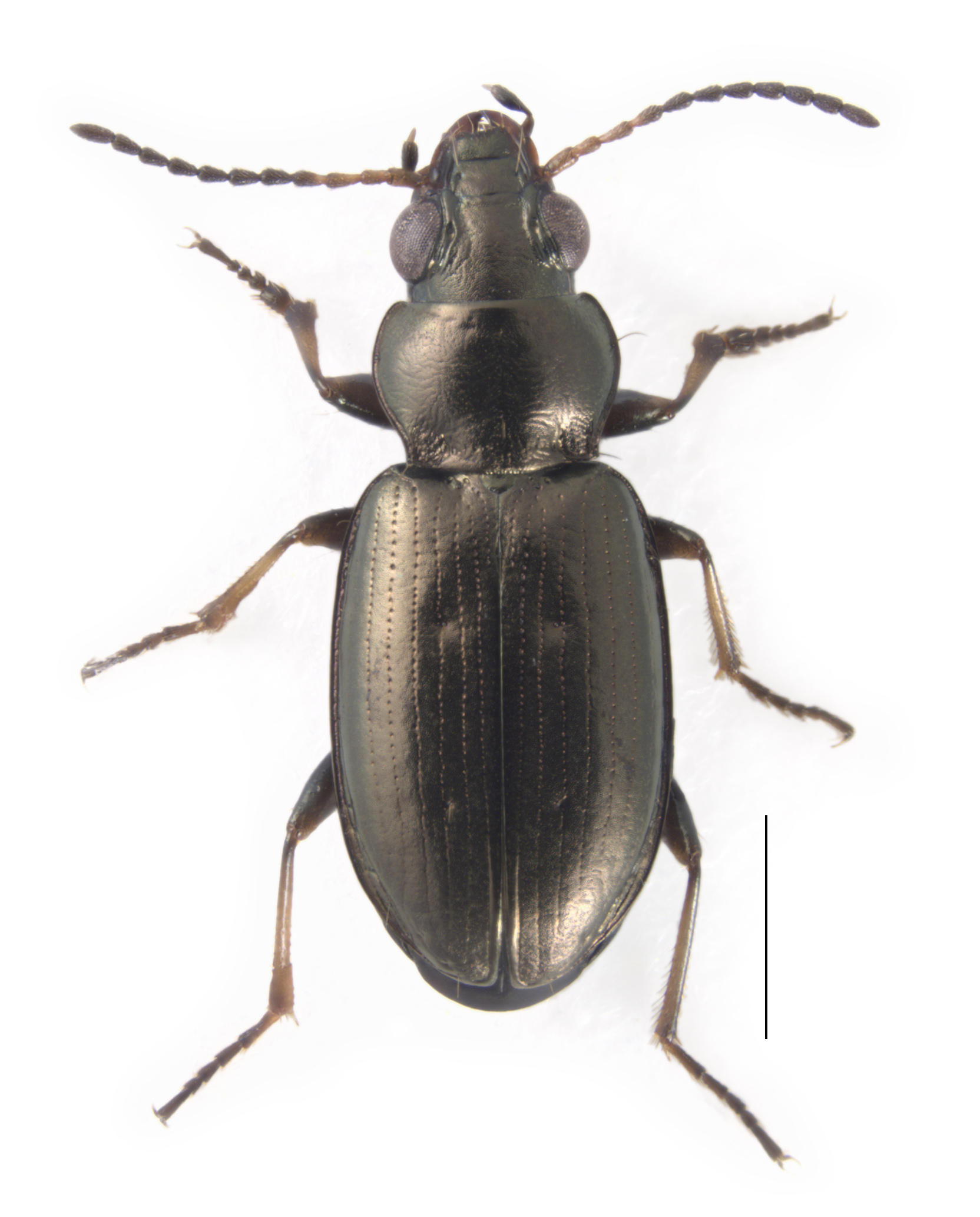

Scientific classification
- Kingdom: Animalia
- Phylum: Arthropoda
- Class: Insecta
- Order: Coleoptera
- Suborder: Adephaga
- Family: Carabidae
- Genus: Bembidion
- Species: B. ambiguum

Binomial name
- Bembidion ambiguum Dejean, 1831

= Bembidion ambiguum =

Species of beetle

Bembidion ambiguum is a species of ground beetle native to the Mediterranean region of Europe and North Africa. It is mainly confined to coastal salt marshes on moist clay soil.

The species has been recently established in North America, around San Francisco Bay, California. It was first reported there in 2012, and is the ninth European species of the genus Bembidion to become established in North America.
