= Bembidion rusticum =

Scientific classification
- Kingdom: Animalia
- Phylum: Arthropoda
- Class: Insecta
- Order: Coleoptera
- Suborder: Adephaga
- Family: Carabidae
- Genus: Bembidion
- Species: B. rusticum

Binomial name
- Bembidion rusticum Casey, 1918

Species of beetle

Bembidion rusticum is a species of ground beetle in the family Carabidae. It is found in North America.

== Subspecies ==
These two subspecies belong to the species Bembidion rusticum:

- Bembidion rusticum lenensoides Lindroth, 1963
- Bembidion rusticum rusticum Casey, 1918
