= Bembidion sulcipenne =

Scientific classification
- Kingdom: Animalia
- Phylum: Arthropoda
- Class: Insecta
- Order: Coleoptera
- Suborder: Adephaga
- Family: Carabidae
- Genus: Bembidion
- Species: B. sulcipenne

Binomial name
- Bembidion sulcipenne J. Sahlberg, 1880

Species of beetle

Bembidion sulcipenne is a species of ground beetle in the family Carabidae. It is found in Europe and Northern Asia (excluding China) and North America.

== Subspecies ==
These three subspecies belong to the species Bembidion sulcipenne:

- Bembidion sulcipenne hyperboroides Lindroth, 1963
- Bembidion sulcipenne prasinoides Lindroth, 1963
- Bembidion sulcipenne sulcipenne J. Sahlberg, 1880
