= Bembidion constrictum =

Scientific classification
- Kingdom: Animalia
- Phylum: Arthropoda
- Clade: Pancrustacea
- Class: Insecta
- Order: Coleoptera
- Suborder: Adephaga
- Family: Carabidae
- Genus: Bembidion
- Species: B. constrictum

Binomial name
- Bembidion constrictum (LeConte, 1847)

Synonyms
- Ochthedromus constrictus LeConte, 1847; Bembidion civile Casey, 1918; Bembidion festinans Casey, 1918; Bembidion vernula Casey, 1884

Species of beetle

Bembidion constrictum is a species of ground beetle in the family Carabidae. It is found along the Atlantic and Gulf of Mexican coasts of North America, from southeastern Texas (USA) to the Maritime provinces (Canada). Inland records likely refer to other species.

== Subspecies ==
These three subspecies belong to the species Bembidion constrictum:

- Bembidion constrictum civile Casey
- Bembidion constrictum constrictum
- Bembidion constrictum vernula Casey
