= Bembidion complanulum =

Scientific classification
- Kingdom: Animalia
- Phylum: Arthropoda
- Class: Insecta
- Order: Coleoptera
- Suborder: Adephaga
- Family: Carabidae
- Genus: Bembidion
- Species: B. complanulum

Binomial name
- Bembidion complanulum (Mannerheim, 1853)

Synonyms
- Peryphus complanulus Mannerheim, 1853; Bembidion parvulum Notman, 1922

Species of beetle

Bembidion complanulum is a species of ground beetle in the family Carabidae. It is found in western North America, from the Aleutian Islands and Alaska to California.
