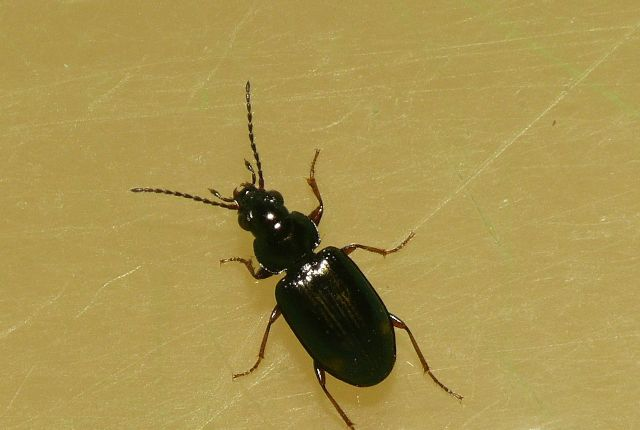

Scientific classification
- Kingdom: Animalia
- Phylum: Arthropoda
- Clade: Pancrustacea
- Class: Insecta
- Order: Coleoptera
- Suborder: Adephaga
- Family: Carabidae
- Genus: Bembidion
- Species: B. doris

Binomial name
- Bembidion doris (Panzer, 1796)

= Bembidion doris =

Species of beetle

Bembidion doris is a species of ground beetle native to Europe.
