= Bembidion viridicolle =

Scientific classification
- Kingdom: Animalia
- Phylum: Arthropoda
- Class: Insecta
- Order: Coleoptera
- Suborder: Adephaga
- Family: Carabidae
- Genus: Bembidion
- Species: B. viridicolle

Binomial name
- Bembidion viridicolle (LaFerté-Sénectere, 1841)

Synonyms
- Notaphus viridicollis LaFerté-Sénectere, 1841; Bembidium apicale Jacquelin du Val, 1857 – homonym of Bembidium apicale Ménétriés, 1832; Bembidicium chevrolati Gemminger and Harold, 1868 – replacement name for B. apicale; Bembidium hamiferum Chaudoir, 1868; Bembidion particeps Casey, 1918

Species of beetle

Bembidion viridicolle is a species of ground beetle in the family Carabidae. It is widely distributed in North America, from southern Northwest Territories in Canada to Mexico and the Caribbean, including The Bahamas.
