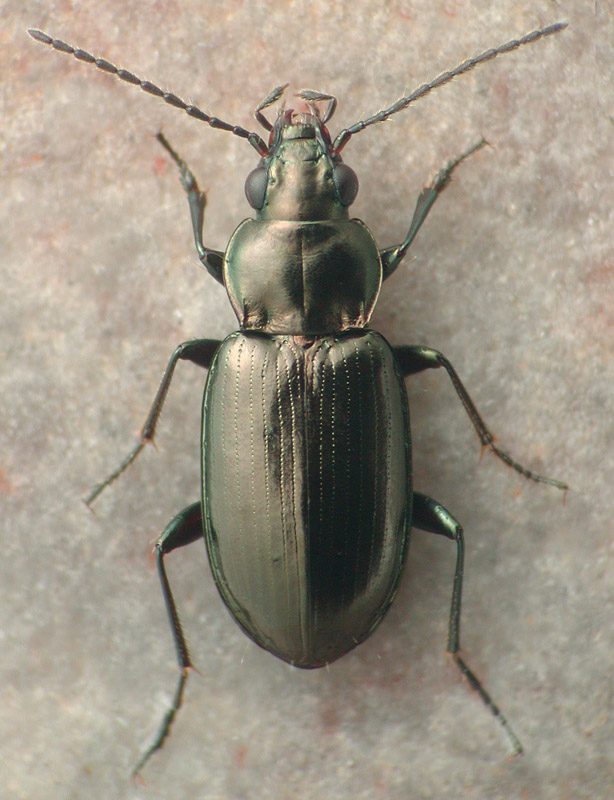

Scientific classification
- Kingdom: Animalia
- Phylum: Arthropoda
- Class: Insecta
- Order: Coleoptera
- Suborder: Adephaga
- Family: Carabidae
- Genus: Bembidion
- Species: B. coloradense

Binomial name
- Bembidion coloradense Hayward, 1897

Synonyms
- Bembidion imperitum Casey, 1918; Bembidion prociduum Casey, 1918; Bembidion amplipenne Casey, 1924; Bembidion albertanum Casey, 1924

= Bembidion coloradense =

Species of beetle

Bembidion coloradense is a species of beetle in the family Carabidae. It is found in Canada and the United States.
