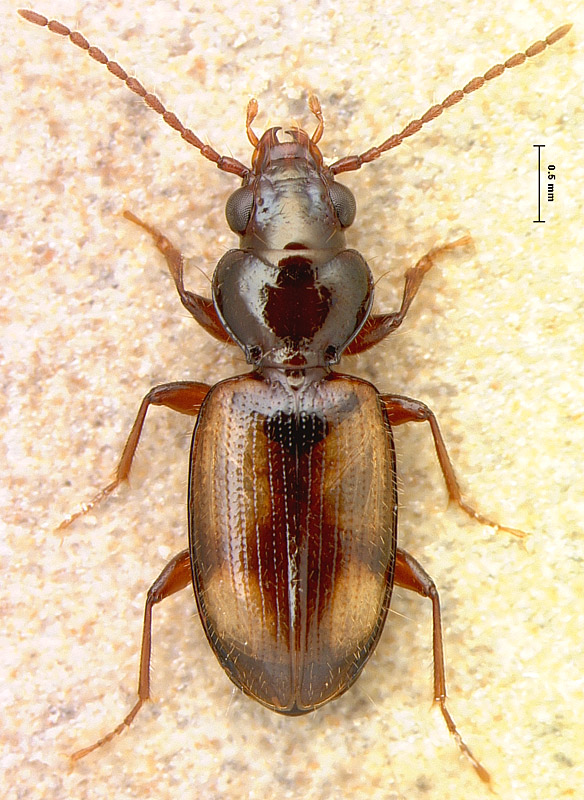

Scientific classification
- Kingdom: Animalia
- Phylum: Arthropoda
- Class: Insecta
- Order: Coleoptera
- Suborder: Adephaga
- Family: Carabidae
- Genus: Bembidion
- Species: B. constricticolle

Binomial name
- Bembidion constricticolle Hayward, 1897

= Bembidion constricticolle =

Species of beetle

Bembidion constricticolle is a species of beetles in the family Carabidae. It is found in Alberta, Canada and the United States.
