= Bembidion levigatum =

Scientific classification
- Kingdom: Animalia
- Phylum: Arthropoda
- Class: Insecta
- Order: Coleoptera
- Suborder: Adephaga
- Family: Carabidae
- Genus: Bembidion
- Species: B. levigatum

Binomial name
- Bembidion levigatum Say, 1823

Species of beetle

Bembidion levigatum is a species of ground beetle in the family Carabidae. It is found in Central America and North America.
