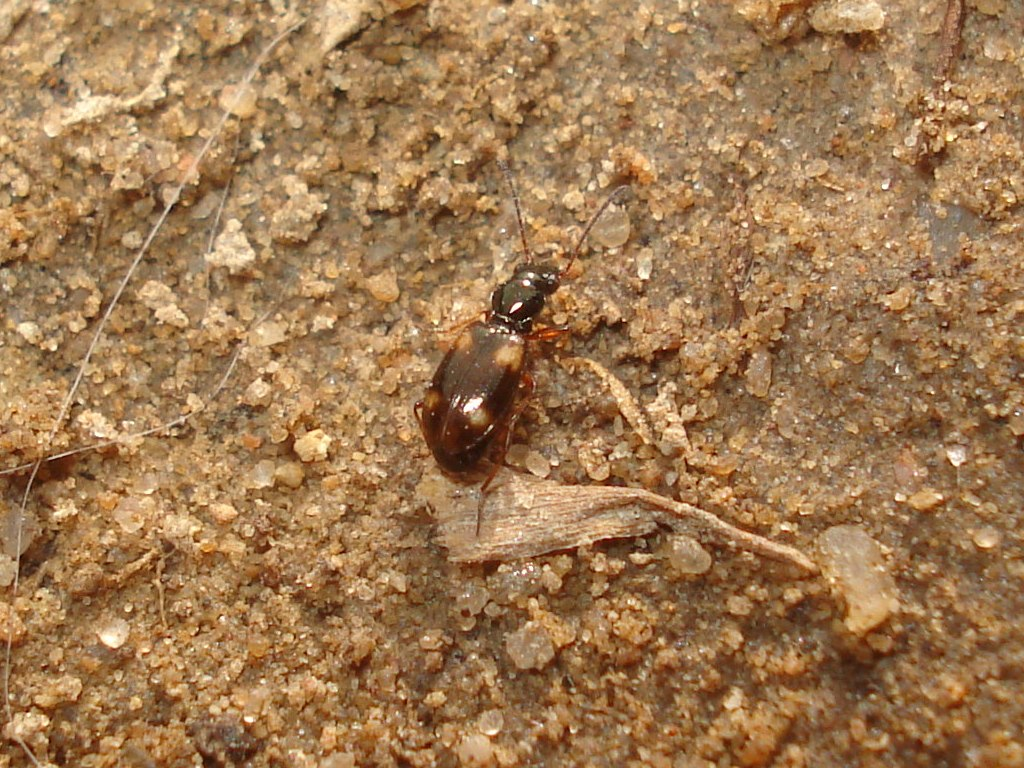

Scientific classification
- Kingdom: Animalia
- Phylum: Arthropoda
- Class: Insecta
- Order: Coleoptera
- Suborder: Adephaga
- Family: Carabidae
- Genus: Bembidion
- Species: B. quadrimaculatum

Binomial name
- Bembidion quadrimaculatum (Linnaeus, 1761)

= Bembidion quadrimaculatum =

Species of beetle

Bembidion quadrimaculatum is a species of ground beetle of the family Carabidae. It is found in Europe and Northern Asia (excluding China), North America, and Southern Asia.

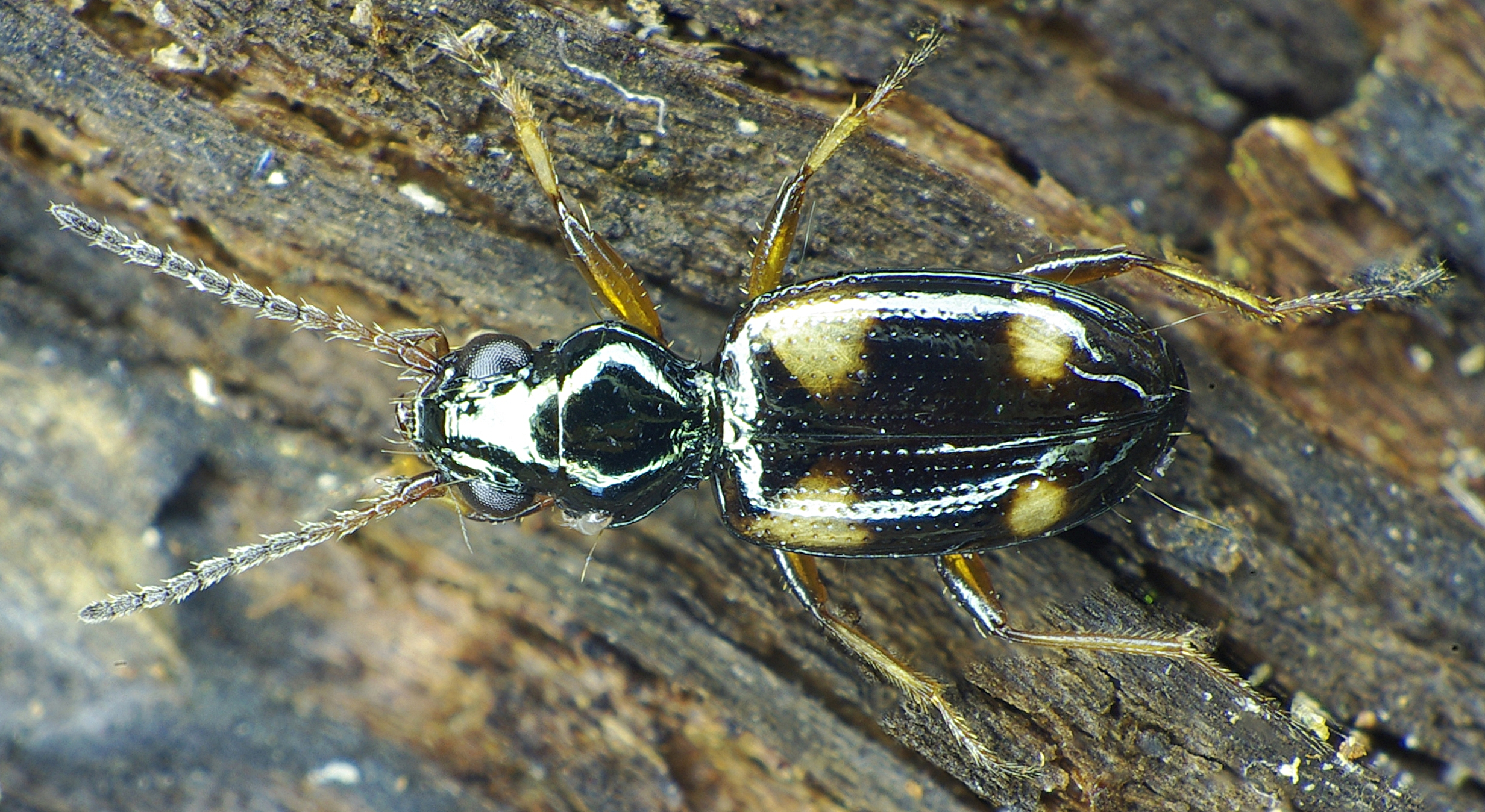

== Subspecies ==
These six subspecies belong to the species Bembidion quadrimaculatum:

- Bembidion quadrimaculatum caporiaccoi Netolitzky, 1935^{c g}
- Bembidion quadrimaculatum cardiaderum Solsky, 1874^{c g}
- Bembidion quadrimaculatum dubitans (LeConte, 1852)^{i c g b}
- Bembidion quadrimaculatum mandli Netolitzky, 1932^{c g}
- Bembidion quadrimaculatum oppositum Say, 1823^{i c g b}
- Bembidion quadrimaculatum quadrimaculatum (Linnaeus, 1761)^{i c g}

Data sources: i = ITIS, c = Catalogue of Life, g = GBIF, b = Bugguide.net
