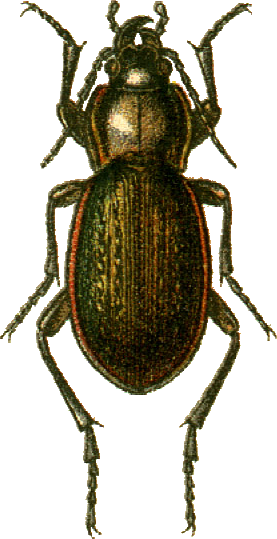

Scientific classification
- Domain: Eukaryota
- Kingdom: Animalia
- Phylum: Arthropoda
- Class: Insecta
- Order: Coleoptera
- Suborder: Adephaga
- Family: Carabidae
- Genus: Carabus
- Species: C. stscheglowi

Binomial name
- Carabus stscheglowi Mannerheim, 1827

= Carabus stscheglowi =

Species of beetle

Carabus stscheglowi is a species of ground beetle in the subfamily Carabinae. It can be found in European Russia and in Ukraine. The male and female are both about 20 millimetres (0.79 in) long.
