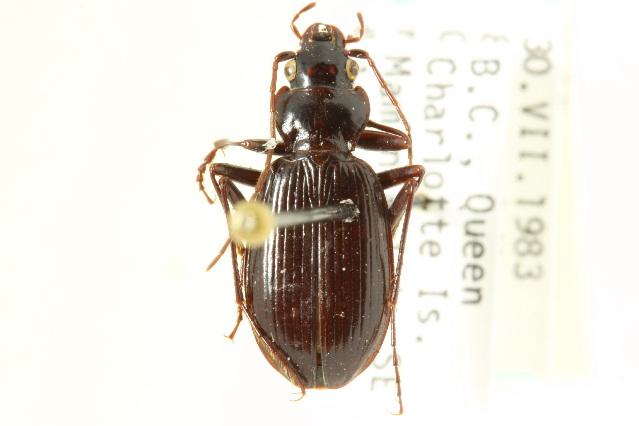

Scientific classification
- Kingdom: Animalia
- Phylum: Arthropoda
- Class: Insecta
- Order: Coleoptera
- Suborder: Adephaga
- Family: Carabidae
- Genus: Nebria
- Species: N. mannerheimii

Binomial name
- Nebria mannerheimii Fischer von Waldheim, 1828

Synonyms
- Nebria oregona Casey, 1913; Nebria corvallis Casey, 1924; Nebria hippisleyi Casey, 1924

= Nebria mannerheimii =

Species of beetle

Nebria mannerheimii, Mannerheim's gazelle beetle, is a species of ground beetle in the family Carabidae, where it is found in North America (British Columbia, Alaska, Idaho, Oregon, Washington), where it inhabits areas along running streams and rivers.

Adults are nocturnal and carnivorous.
