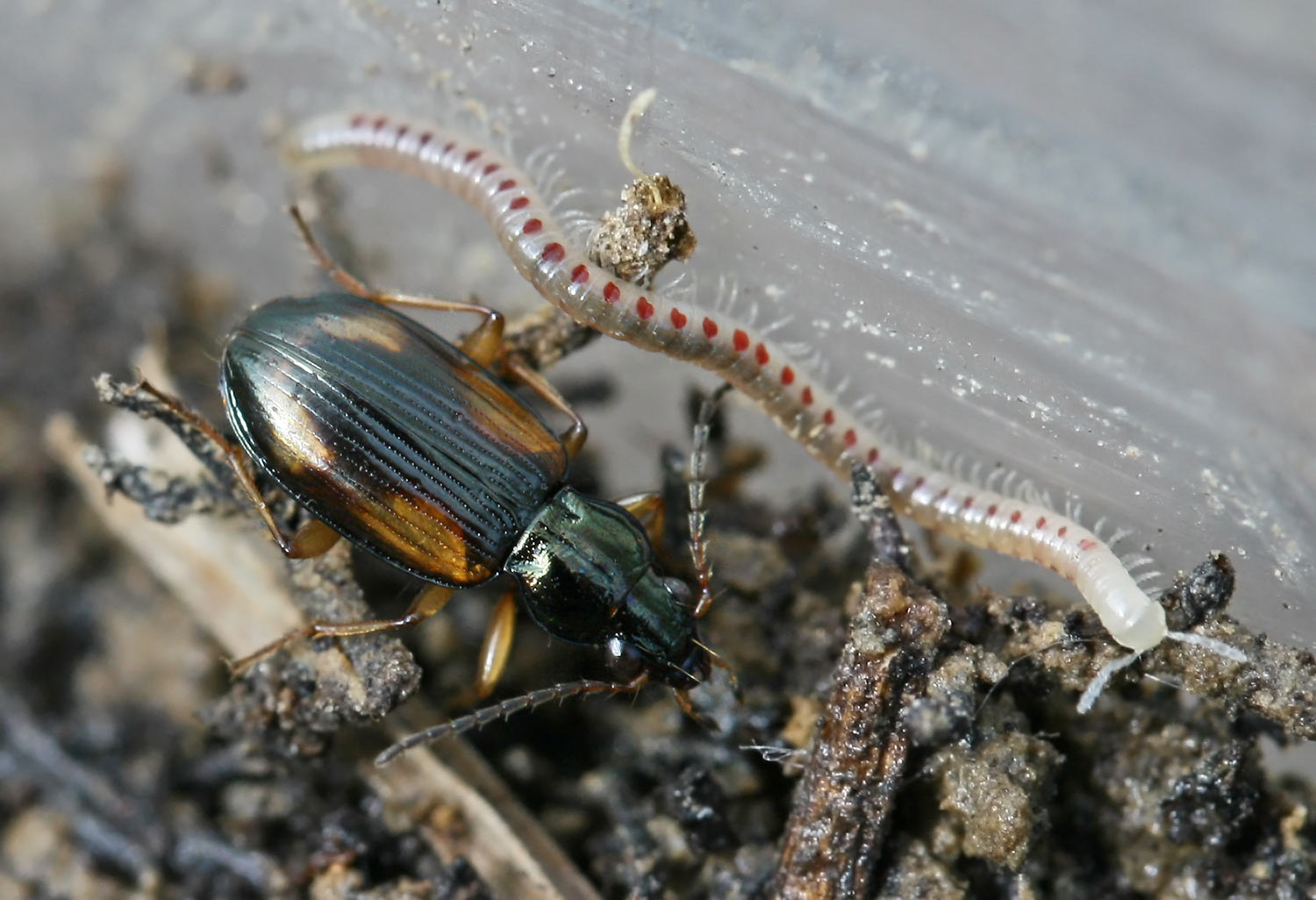

Scientific classification
- Kingdom: Animalia
- Phylum: Arthropoda
- Class: Insecta
- Order: Coleoptera
- Suborder: Adephaga
- Family: Carabidae
- Genus: Bembidion
- Species: B. tetracolum

Binomial name
- Bembidion tetracolum Say, 1825

= Bembidion tetracolum =

Species of ground beetle

Bembidion tetracolum is a species of ground beetle native to Europe.
