= Harpalus fulvilabris =

Scientific classification
- Kingdom: Animalia
- Phylum: Arthropoda
- Class: Insecta
- Order: Coleoptera
- Suborder: Adephaga
- Family: Carabidae
- Genus: Harpalus
- Species: H. fulvilabris

Binomial name
- Harpalus fulvilabris Mannerheim, 1853

Species of beetle

Harpalus fulvilabris is a species of ground beetle in the subfamily Harpalinae. It was described by Carl Gustaf Mannerheim in 1853.
