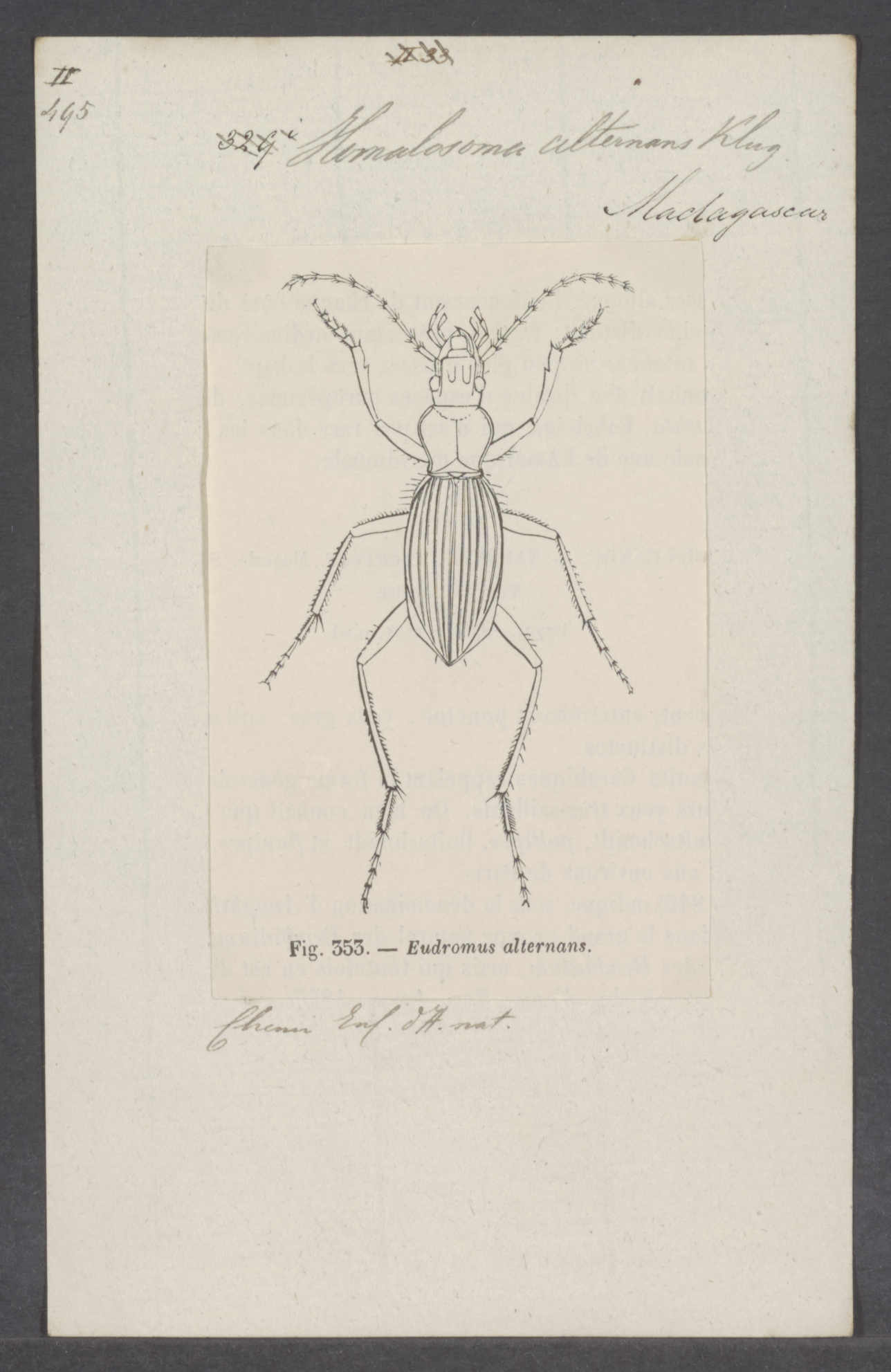
- A representation of an Eudromus Striaticollis

Scientific classification
- Kingdom: Animalia
- Phylum: Arthropoda
- Clade: Pancrustacea
- Class: Insecta
- Order: Coleoptera
- Suborder: Adephaga
- Family: Carabidae
- Subfamily: Pterostichinae
- Tribe: Pterostichini
- Subtribe: Pterostichina
- Genus: Eudromus; Klug, 1835

= Eudromus =

Genus of beetles

Eudromus is a genus in the beetle family Carabidae. There are about six described species in Eudromus, found in Madagascar.

== Species ==
These six species belong to the genus Eudromus:

- Eudromus andreonei (Deuve, 2015)
- Eudromus ankavandrae Tschitscherine, 1900
- Eudromus bastardi Alluaud, 1932
- Eudromus imerinae Alluaud, 1932
- Eudromus perrieri Fairmaire, 1903
- Eudromus striaticollis (Brullé, 1834)
