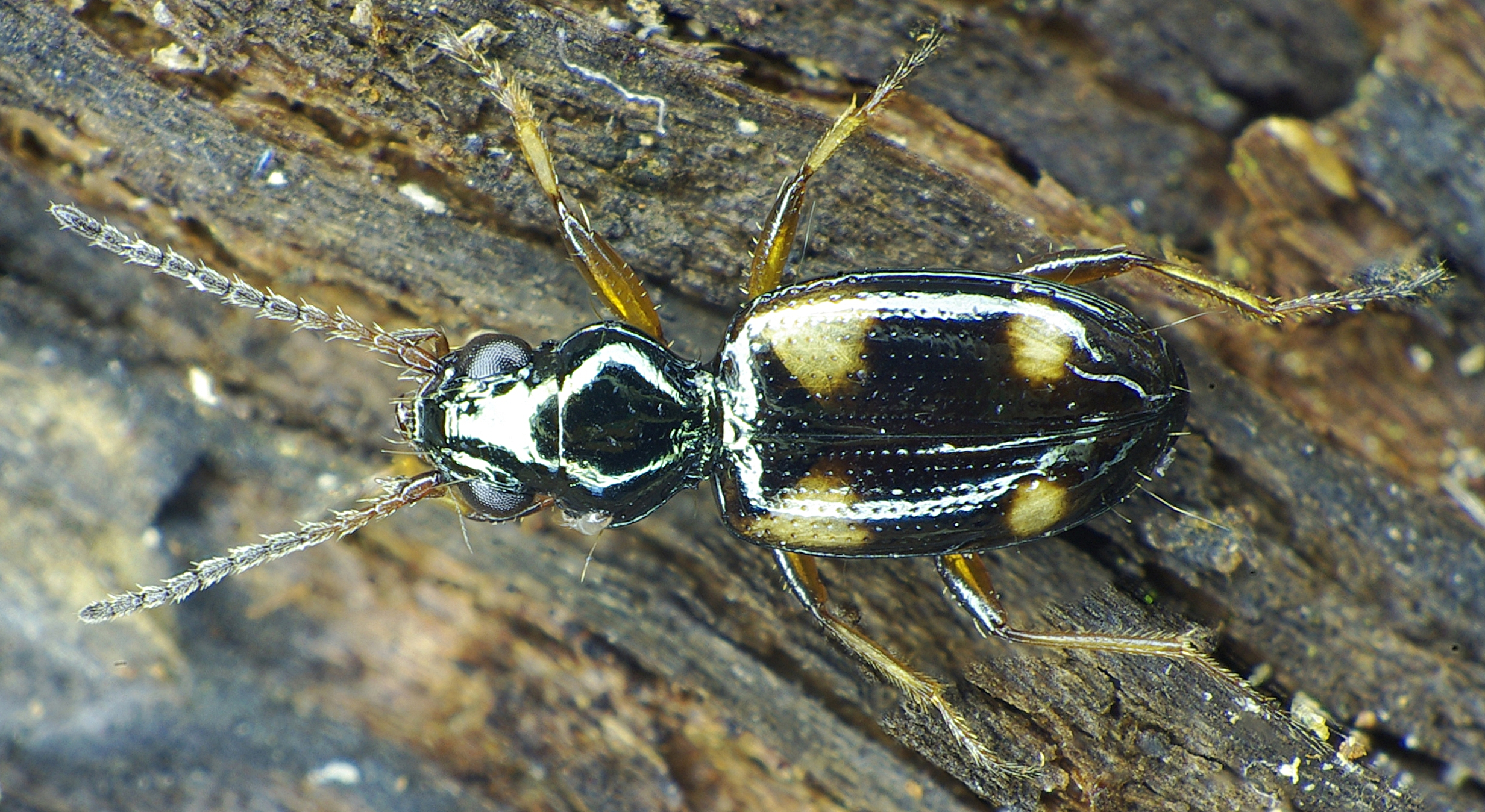
- Bembidion quadrimaculatum
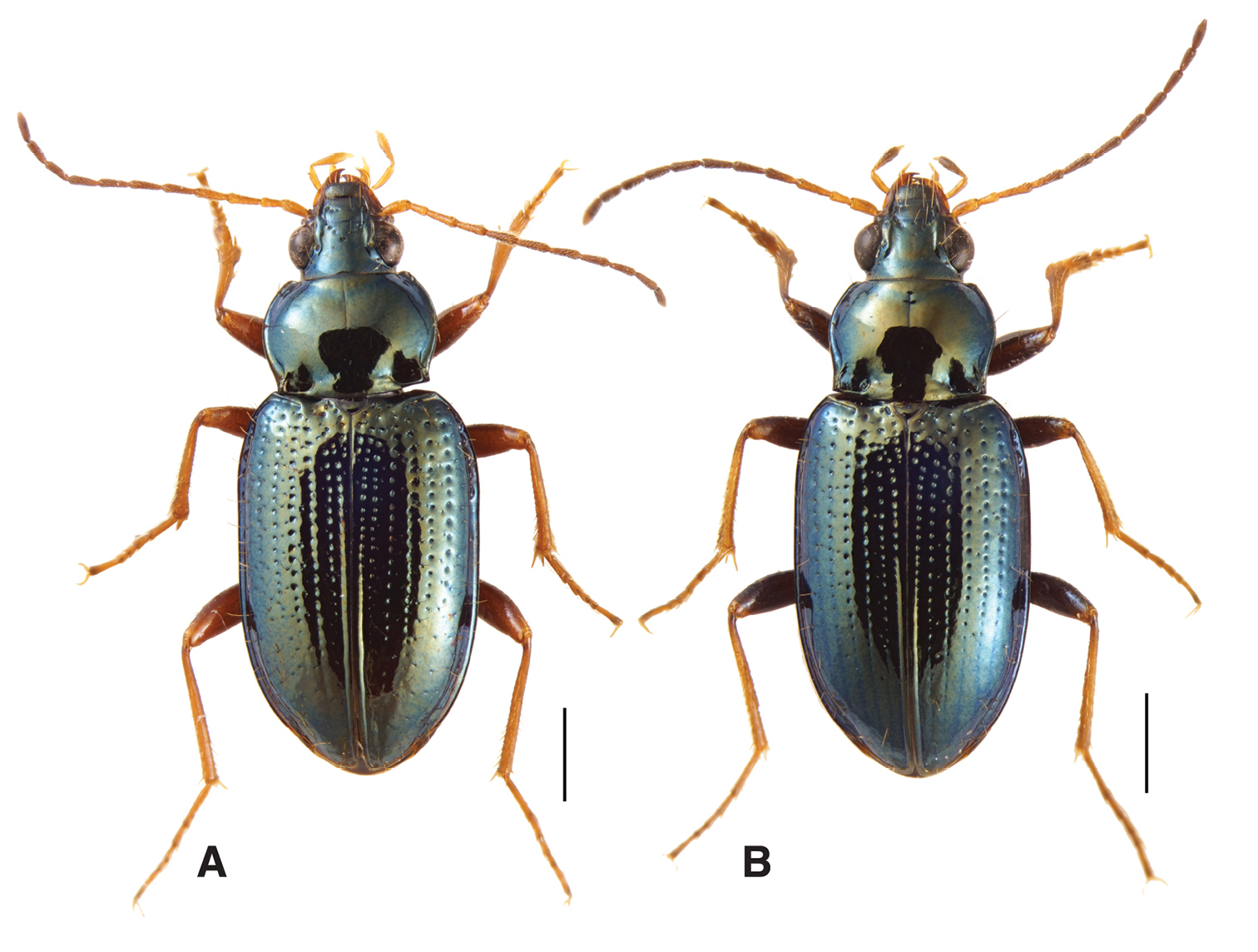
- Bembidion levigatum (A) and Bembidion mimbres (B)

Scientific classification
- Kingdom: Animalia
- Phylum: Arthropoda
- Class: Insecta
- Order: Coleoptera
- Suborder: Adephaga
- Family: Carabidae
- Subtribe: Bembidiina
- Genus: Bembidion; Latreille, 1802

Diversity
- At least 1400 species

Synonyms
- Sakagutia; Zecillenus

= Bembidion =

Genus of beetles

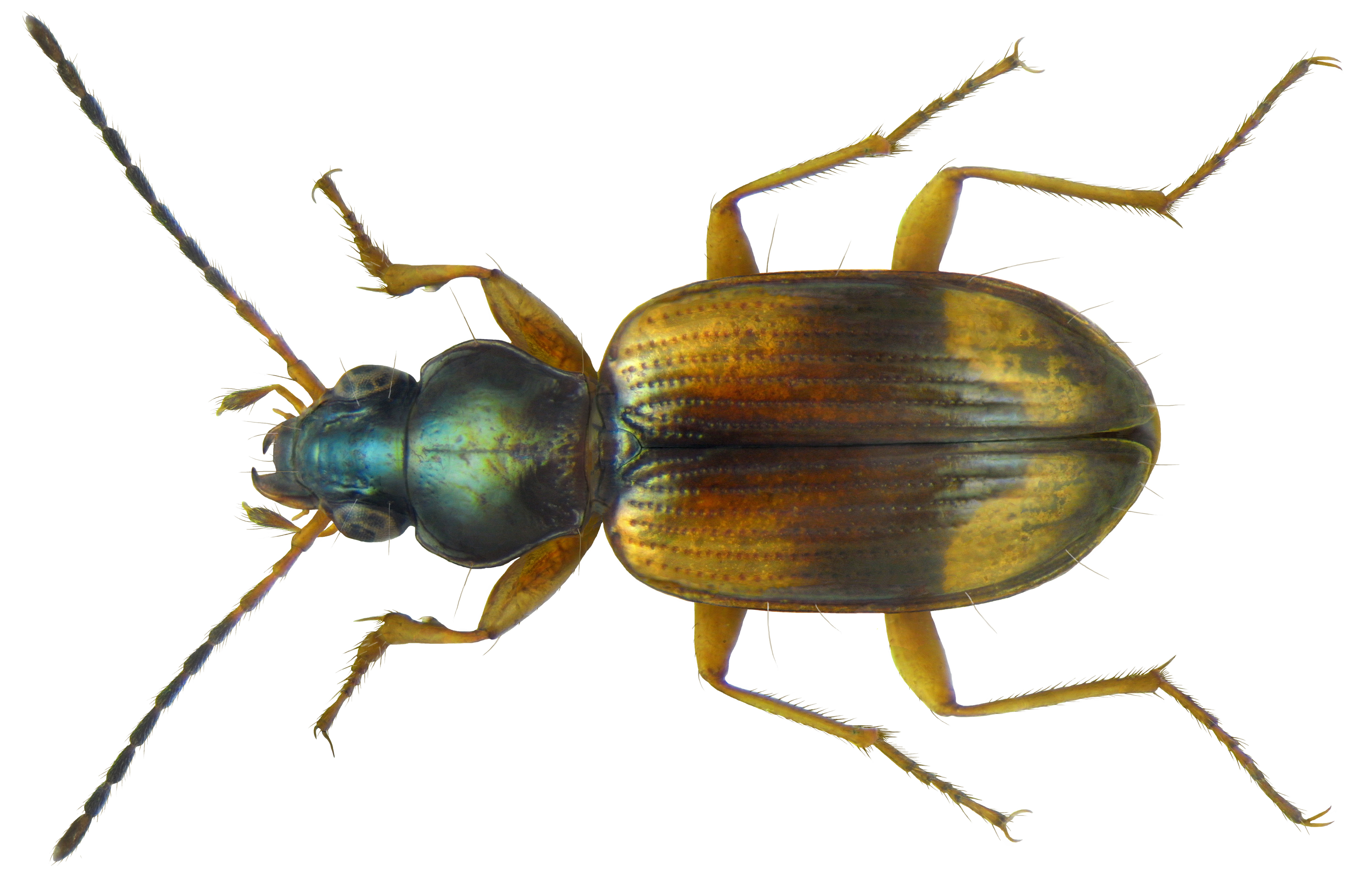
Bembidion tetracolum

Bembidion is the largest genus of beetles in the family Carabidae by number of species. All species are small (less than 7.5 mm) and move very fast. Most of them live close to water. The genus has a biantitropical distribution, meaning they are found in both the Northern and Southern Hemispheres, but not in the tropics. In warmer regions it is substituted by closely related Tachys and other genera.

== Taxonomy ==
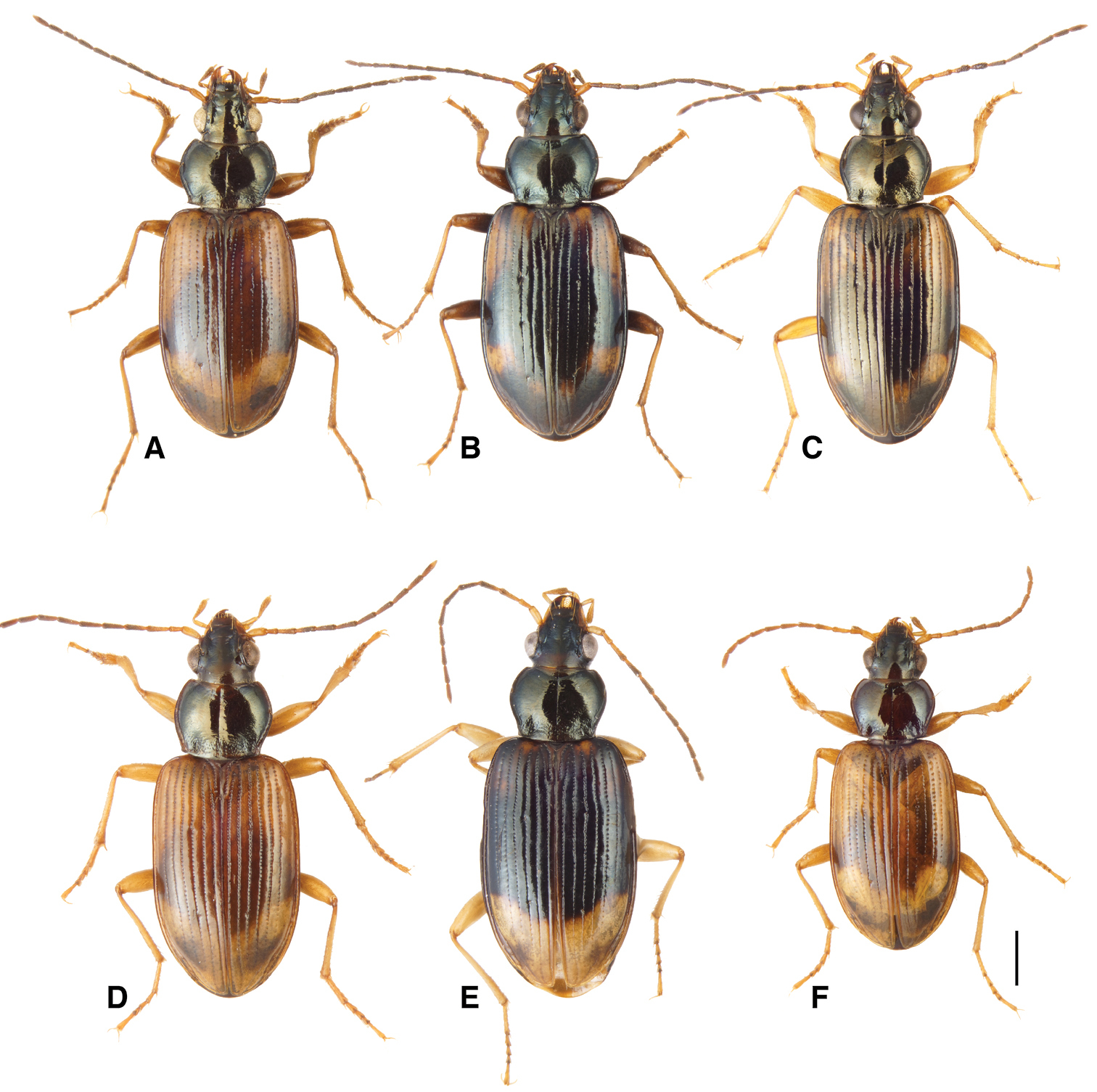
Diversity of genus Bembidion. (A) Bembidion transversale, (B) Bembidion erosum, (C) Bembidion corgenoma, (D and E) Bembidion perspicuum, (F)Bembidion sarpedon.

There have been many attempts to divide it into smaller genera, most notably by René Jeannel in 1941 and by G.G. Perrault in 1981, but none of them have been generally accepted.

This genus is divided into numerus subgenera, some of which are elevated to full genus rank by various authors; as noted above, however, no universally accepted way of splitting the genus exists yet. Bembidion subgenera include:

- Actedium Motschulsky, 1864
- Ananotaphus Netolitzky, 1931
- Andrewesa Netolitzky, 1931
- Antiperyphanes Jeannel, 1962
- Antiperyphus Jeannel, 1962
- Aptenidium Habu & Ueno, 1955
- Apteromimus Wollaston, 1877
- Armatocillenus Dupuis, 1912
- Asioperyphus Vysoky, 1986
- Aureoplataphus Netolitzky, 1943
- Australoemphanes Toledano, 2005
- Bembidion Latreille, 1802
- Bembidionetolitzkya E.Strand, 1929
- Bembidromus Toledano, 2000
- Blepharoplataphus Netolitzky, 1920
- Bracteon Bedel, 1879
- Chilioperyphus Jeannel, 1962
- Chinocillenus Netolitzky, 1942
- Chlorodium Motschulsky, 1864
- Cillenus Samouelle, 1819
- Cyclolopha Casey, 1918
- Desarmatocillenus Netolitzky, 1939
- Diplocampa Bedel, 1896
- Ecuadion Moret & Toledano, 2002
- Emphanes Motschulsky, 1850
- Endosomatium Wollaston, 1877
- Euperyphus Jeannel, 1941
- Eupetedromus Netolitzky, 1911
- Furcacampa Netolitzky, 1931
- Gnatholymnaeum Sharp, 1903
- Gondwanabembidion Toledano, 2005
- Hirmoplataphus Lindroth, 1963
- Hoquedela Müller-Motzfeld, 1988
- Hydriomicrus Casey, 1918
- Hydrium LeConte, 1847
- Hypsipezum Alluaud, 1917
- Jammuphanes J.Schmidt & Marggi, 2014
- Jedlickion Toledano, 2008
- Josefia Toledano, 2000
- Leuchydrium Casey, 1918
- Limnaeoperyphus Nakane, 1963
- Lindrochthus Maddison, 2012
- Liocosmius Casey, 1918
- Lymnaeum Stephens, 1828
- Melomalus Casey, 1918
- Metallina Motschulsky, 1850
- Microserrullula Netolitzky, 1921
- Microsinocys Toledano, 1998
- Necpericompsus Netolitzky, 1935
- Neja Motschulsky, 1864
- Neobembidion Bousquet, 2006
- Neoemphanes Habu, 1978
- Nepha Motschulsky, 1864
- Nesocidium Sharp, 1903
- Nipponobembidion Habu & Baba, 1968
- Notaphemphanes Netolitzky, 1920
- Notaphocampa Netolitzky, 1914
- Notaphus Dejean, 1821
- Nothocys Jeannel, 1962
- Notholopha Jeannel, 1962
- Nothonepha Jeannel, 1962
- Notoperyphus Bonniard de Saludo, 1970
- Ochthedromus LeConte, 1847
- Ocydromus Clairville, 1806
- Ocyturanes Müller-Motzfeld, 1986
- Odontium LeConte, 1847
- Omoperyphus Netolitzky, 1931
- Omotaphus Netolitzky, 1914
- Pacmophena Jeannel, 1962
- Pamirium Netolitzky, 1920
- Paraprincidium Netolitzky, 1914
- Pekinium Csiki, 1901
- Peryphanes Jeannel, 1941
- Peryphidium Tschitscherine, 1895
- Peryphiolus Jeannel, 1941
- Peryphodes Casey, 1918
- Peryphophila Netolitzky, 1939
- Peryphus Dejean, 1821
- Philochthemphanes Netolitzky, 1943
- Philochthus Stephens, 1828
- Phyla Motschulsky, 1844
- Plataphus Motschulsky, 1864
- Plocamoperyphus Jeannel, 1962
- Politophanes Müller-Motzfeld, 1998
- Princidium Motschulsky, 1864
- Pseudometallina Netolitzky, 1920
- Pseudoperyphus Hatch, 1950
- Pseudophilochthus Wollaston, 1877
- Pseudosinocys Toledano, 2005
- Pseudotrepanes Jeannel, 1962
- Sakagutia Ueno, 1954
- Semicampa Netolitzky, 1910
- Sloanephila Netolitzky, 1931
- Taiwanobembidion Habu, 1973
- Talanes Motschulsky, 1864
- Terminophanes Müller-Motzfeld, 1998
- Testediolum Ganglbauer, 1891
- Testedium Motschulsky, 1864
- Thaumatoperyphus Netolitzky, 1935
- Trechonepha Casey, 1918
- Trepanedoris Netolitzky, 1918
- Trepanes Motschulsky, 1864
- Trichoplataphus Netolitzky, 1914
- Zeactedium Netolitzky, 1931
- Zecillenus Lindroth, 1980
- Zemetallina Lindroth, 1976
- Zeperyphodes Lindroth, 1976
- Zeperyphus Lindroth, 1976
- Zeplataphus Lindroth, 1976
- † Archaeophilochthus Ortuño & Arillo, 2010
- † Eodontium J.Schmidt & Michalik, 2017
